= Late-night television in the United States =

Outline and history of American late-night television

Late-night television is the general term for television programs produced for broadcast during the late evening and overnight hours—most commonly shown after, if not in competition with, local late-evening newscasts; programs that have been showcased in the daypart historically (though not necessarily exclusively) encompassed a particular genre of programming that falls somewhere between a variety show and a talk show. Late-night shows predominantly cater to night owls, people suffering from insomnia, shift workers with irregular schedule assignments, younger male audiences and college students, along with spillover audiences through viewers of entertainment and news programs aired earlier in the evening.

In the United States, the late night slot primarily encompasses the "late fringe" daypart leading out of prime time (and typically encompassing the half-hour to 35-minute "late news" slot associated with local and, in some cases, network late-evening newscasts), usually running after 11:00 p.m. and through 2:00 a.m. Eastern and Pacific Time (ET/PT). An informal broader definition of the daypart includes the designated overnight graveyard slot (encompassing programs airing as late as 5:00 a.m. local time).

This article focuses on television programs, genres and other programming concepts common in American late night television, primarily focusing on programs typically shown on national broadcast and cable television networks and in syndication.

== Talk shows ==
The late-night talk show format traces its roots in early television variety shows, a format that originated on radio and the dominant form of light entertainment during most of the old-time radio era, and in particular incorporates some elements tracing to the 1938–48 weekly NBC radio program The Pepsodent Show, which featured an opening segment in which host Bob Hope delivered rapid-fire, topical and often political observational humor. The first late-night television program was the 1950–51 NBC variety program Broadway Open House, which ended as a result of host Jerry Lester's decision to leave the show amid frustration with being upstaged by sidekick Virginia "Dagmar" Lewis, burnout from having to go through a large amount of material in a short time, and the lack of enough television sets in American households to make late night programming viable. The first televised late-night talk show was The Faye Emerson Show, a 15-minute program that aired on CBS (first on selected East Coast stations and then nationwide beginning in March 1950) from 1949 to 1952. Emerson's show was distinctive from her NBC competition in that she was more openly political (a precursor to the political humor that would become standard in late-night monologues in later decades); Emerson, an avowed Democrat, regularly interviewed political and intellectual figures on the program (one such interview featured Soviet leader Joseph Stalin), in addition to showcasing some vaudeville and variety acts.

Tonight Starring Steve Allen, the first iteration of The Tonight Show that debuted on NBC in September 1954, developed many modern talk show concepts including an opening monologue, celebrity interviews, audience participation segments, comedy bits, and musical performances, accompanied by the show's house band; it also incorporated concepts taken from the radio era, including a vocal group (Steve and Eydie, who went on to decades of success as music artists after leaving Tonight amid its short-lived 1957 reformatting as Tonight! America After Dark), something that later late-night shows would abandon. The expansion of television stations across the country, and households owning television sets helped Tonight to become a major success. CBS and ABC waited until the 1960s to wade into any major late-night programming efforts. ABC entered the arena in November 1964 with The Les Crane Show, which lasted until February 1965 in its original format; it was then retooled as ABC's Nightlife, which originally employed rotating guest hosts before bringing back Crane as host that June for what would be the final six months of the program's run. CBS joined the fray five years later in August 1969 with The Merv Griffin Show, which began seven years earlier as an NBC daytime program before returning in syndication (with some stations airing it opposite The Tonight Show Starring Johnny Carson) in 1965; Griffin, whose show was mired in second place behind the dominant Carson, chose to reach an agreement with the network to end his contract early, sensing it would soon cancel the show, and signed a contract with Metromedia Producers Corporation to continue his program in syndication, where it lasted until 1986.

Popular shows within the late night talk show genre include The Tonight Show Starring Jimmy Fallon (NBC, 2014–present; the seventh iteration of the franchise that has aired since 1954), Late Night with Seth Meyers (NBC, 2014–present; the fourth iteration of the franchise that has aired since 1982) and Jimmy Kimmel Live! (ABC, 2003–present). Famous former hosts include Johnny Carson of The Tonight Show Starring Johnny Carson; David Letterman of Late Night with David Letterman and Late Show with David Letterman (as well as the short-lived daytime David Letterman Show); Conan O'Brien of Late Night with Conan O'Brien, The Tonight Show with Conan O'Brien, and Conan; Jay Leno of The Tonight Show with Jay Leno (who has taped more episodes than any other late night host); Stephen Colbert of The Colbert Report and The Late Show with Stephen Colbert; James Corden of The Late Late Show with James Corden; Craig Ferguson of The Late Late Show with Craig Ferguson; Arsenio Hall of The Arsenio Hall Show; Tom Snyder of Tomorrow and The Late Late Show; Steve Allen, the father of the late night talk show and founder of Tonight (now known as The Tonight Show); Merv Griffin and Dick Cavett, early competitors with Carson; and Jack Paar, the man who followed Steve Allen as host of The Tonight Show and who is responsible for setting the standards for the genre.

Networks typically produce two late night shows: one taped in New York City and one in Los Angeles. Most are taped late in the afternoon; the lone exception (as of May 2026) is Jimmy Kimmel Live!, which finishes taping about an hour before its initial broadcast in the Eastern and Central Time Zones. Similarly, during its 2015–26 run, The Late Show with Stephen Colbert aired live after events of major importance (such as the State of the Union address, party nomination conventions and presidential debates during election years, and selected major federal elections like the 2020 presidential election). The fact that the genre’s typical afternoon taping schedule limits accurate coverage of the latest 24-hour news cycle is sometimes the source of ironic humor or notable delays (for instance, the death of Michael Jackson, a frequent butt of late night jokes, on the afternoon of June 25, 2009 came after all but Jimmy Kimmel Live! had taped their shows, and as such, Kimmel was the only one to mention it that night).

Despite being more appointment-oriented shows, the late-night talk format had been enduring declining viewership and advertising revenue since the mid-2010s due to competition from streaming, making many of the shows increasingly expensive to produce because of declining profitability. In July 2025, CBS (which had struggled in late night until Letterman moved to the network in 1993) became the first of the Big Three networks to discontinue late-night talk programming, announcing it would end The Late Show with Stephen Colbert (and its parent franchise) in May 2026, reportedly due to profit losses of up to $100 million in recent years. It sparked controversy, however, as it followed network parent Paramount Global's settlement of a lawsuit filed by President Donald Trump over an October 2024 60 Minutes interview of then-Vice President and Democratic presidential nominee Kamala Harris (Note: The episode, part of the newsmagazine's quadrennial interview of the Democratic and Republican presidential candidates, was to have also featured Trump, who became the first presidential nominee to walk out of and refuse participation in their interview. In the lawsuit, Trump claimed without evidence that Harris' interview was deceptively edited to sway public opinion electorally; Paramount settled despite broad legal consensus that Trump's claims lacked merit on grounds that 60 Minutes's editorial decisions were protected under the First Amendment.) amid concerns the Federal Communications Commission (chaired by Trump appointee Brendan Carr, which approved the deal three weeks later) might interfere in its merger with Skydance Media and came just days after Colbert—a longtime critic of Trump throughout the latter's political career—criticized the settlement on-air. (Trump has expressed distaste of jokes and critiques directed towards him on late-night comedy shows like Colbert, Kimmel and Saturday Night Live in the past, and has publicly mused about imposing punitive measures on broadcasters—including the revocation of licenses—because of such material, despite First Amendment protections applying to satire and political criticism.) As such, many of Trump's critics (including Democratic lawmakers like Adam Schiff and Elizabeth Warren) and the Writers Guild of America (who sent an investigative referral to the New York Attorney General's office regarding Paramount's motives for the decision) questioned whether the cancellation was politically rather than financially motivated.

=== Scheduling ===
Except for a brief period between September 2009 and March 2010, the "Big Three television networks" (NBC, ABC and CBS) have all begun their late night programming at 11:35 p.m. Eastern Time (10:35 p.m. Central) each night. NBC became the first network to start its late night schedule at 11:35 (instead of 11:30 p.m.) in September 1991, in a bid to prevent affiliates from dropping or delaying The Tonight Show Starring Johnny Carson in favor of lucrative syndicated programs; ABC followed suit in September 1992, followed by CBS upon the Late Show with David Letterman's debut in September 1993. Since June 1994, Fox, the fourth major U.S. network, airs only one day of late night programming—Saturday—starting at 11:00 p.m. ET, a half-hour to one hour after the end of prime time to allow most of its stations to air local late-evening newscasts (or syndicated programs on the few affiliates that do not air late-evening newscasts). ABC, CBS and NBC all begin their late night schedules with comedy and interview-based talk shows, though programming in the lead-out 12:35 a.m. ET slot differs on each network: only NBC airs an additional lead-out talk show (Late Night with Seth Meyers) in the slot, while ABC airs the newsmagazine Nightline following Jimmy Kimmel Live!. Since May 2026, however, CBS has maintained a time buy agreement with Allen Media Group Television to program the full two-hour timeslot, which previously featured traditional late-night talk shows in some capacity from January 1989 to September 1990 and from September 1993 to May 2026. In March 2025, CBS announced that it would cease offering first-run programming in the 12:35 timeslot—previously occupied by The Late Late Show from 1995 to 2023—once the comedic panel game show After Midnight (a reboot of the 2013–17 Comedy Central series @midnight that was cancelled after host Taylor Tomlinson decided to return to stand-up comedy full-time) ended its two-season run that June. CBS entered into an initial time buy with Allen to air a two-episode block of original and archived episodes of Comics Unleashed with Byron Allen (which originated as a syndicated series in 2006) as a replacement for After Midnight in the Late Show lead-out slot starting in September 2025. That agreement would extend to the network’s 11:35 slot in March 2026, under an amended time-buy that saw Comics Unleashed replace The Late Show once the latter’s 33-year run ended that May, while the comedy game show Funny You Should Ask (which debuted in syndication in 2017, and also airing as a two-episode block) took over the 12:35 slot.

NBC followed a significantly different model for most of the 2009–10 season, following severe audience losses for the scripted dramas it had been airing in the final hour of prime time. Jay Leno, who in 2004 had announced he would step down as host of the Tonight Show franchise at the end of his renewed five-year contract, had reached a compromise to stay with the network and launch a new talk show in the 10:00 p.m. ET hour, ahead of the local newscasts on most stations in a timeslot that competed with CBS and ABC's respective prime time programs (though Fox affiliates would have cut to post-primetime news or syndicated sitcom reruns by this time). Premiering in September 2009, The Jay Leno Show maintained a format largely similar to his Tonight runs (and carried over some signature Leno-era segments like newspaper blooper segment "Headlines" and the man-on-the-street skit "Jaywalking"). NBC had previously chosen Conan O'Brien (formerly the host of Late Night, another long-running NBC late night franchise) to take over as host of The Tonight Show to avoid a repeat of the 1992 conflict that arose between Leno and David Letterman in their bid to succeed Tonight predecessor Johnny Carson, which saw Letterman leave NBC for his own CBS show; Jimmy Fallon (who would eventually succeed Leno as Tonight host in February 2014) consequently assumed hosting duties for Late Night. Fellow NBC late-night programs Last Call with Carson Daly and Poker After Dark remained as is, and the network warned its affiliates not to preempt or delay Leno for local news (even threatening then-Boston affiliate WHDH—which would eventually lose its NBC affiliation to network-owned WBTS in January 2017—with possible disaffiliation should it go ahead with plans to simulcast a 10:00 newscast produced for sister station WLVI, resulting in the station abandoning that plan). After fears raised by affiliates of significantly lower ratings for their local newscasts from the Leno lead-in were in fact realized, NBC announced it would indeed cancel its 10:00 p.m. experiment after a six-month run and move Leno back to his traditional start time of 11:35, originally by moving The Jay Leno Show, before rejoining as host of The Tonight Show outright after O'Brien negotiated an exit from his Tonight contract in opposition to the network's original plan to shift the latter program later by a half-hour to make room for Leno.

Of the major broadcast networks, NBC, ABC and CBS program the late night slot on weekdays, but only NBC carries first-run entertainment shows in that time period on Saturdays; none of the major networks have ever scheduled first-run late night shows on Sundays on a regular basis. (NBC does offer its affiliates a same-day repeat of its political talk show Meet the Press on Sunday nights, though—as its overnight programming has informally been syndicated to its stations directly, rather than being part of the network's official schedule, since the graveyard block formerly branded as "NBC All Night" debuted in 1998—it is not cleared by the network's owned-and-operated stations.)

Fox carried first-run late night programming on weeknights off-and-on from October 1986 to May 1994 and on Saturdays for most of the time from August 1989 to April 2010. The Late Show Starring Joan Rivers, airing weeknights as a competitor to Tonight (and the cause of a falling-out between Rivers and Carson that was never resolved by the time the latter died in 2005), premiered as Fox’s inaugural series in 1986. Rivers was fired in May 1987 amid low ratings (which had earlier prompted some stations to preempt the show as a condition of affiliation), with the show going through several interim hosts (notably Arsenio Hall and Ross Shafer) and a shift towards tabloid and newsmaker interviews (as well as a brief replacement by news satire series The Wilton North Report) before ending in October 1988. Fox resumed weekday late-night offerings with the September 1993 premiere of The Chevy Chase Show, which was cancelled after five weeks. (Reruns of prime time shows In Living Color and Code 3 filled the weeknight 11:00 p.m. ET hour thereafter until the slot was permanently ceded to their affiliates in August 1994.) The network’s Saturday late-night block debuted in 1989 with the stand-up series Comic Strip Live; the timeslot was repurposed in January 1994 to air edited episodes of the HBO horror anthology Tales from the Crypt, continuing until MADtv premiered in the slot in October 1995. Since the 2010 cancellation of The Wanda Sykes Show with few exceptions thereafter (such as a six-week test run of a daily talk show hosted by Craig Kilborn that failed to be picked up by the network in 2011), the network no longer airs traditional late night programs on any day of the week. The Saturday slot previously occupied by Sykes and MADtv—which has lasted for one hour for most of the time since Fox began programming the slot in 1989, with previous extensions to 90 minutes (2006–08 and 2009–13) and two hours (2008–09, during the expanded hour-long format of Talkshow with Spike Feresten)—consisted only of Fox prime time reruns until the July 2013 debut of the adult animation block Animation Domination High-Def, which was canceled in April 2014 citing an inability to reach its intended young adult demographic, an issue aggravated by frequent sports overruns (though reruns continued to air on the network until 2016); Fox would last attempt first-run late night programming in any capacity in 2016 with the female-led sketch comedy series Party Over Here, which was cancelled after one season; since May 2016, its Saturday late-night slot has been filled by reruns of various unscripted Fox prime time shows.

Up until the early-to-mid-1990s, syndicated late-night talk shows (including among others, The Merv Griffin Show, The David Frost Show, The Byron Allen Show and the notorious flop Thicke of the Night) were fairly common, due to NBC having the only network shows at the time in that daypart. (Although ABC, CBS and later Fox attempted late-night talk formats at various points, NBC faced no formidable network competition in that space until the 1993 debut of CBS's Late Show with David Letterman.) The Arsenio Hall Show, which was distributed by Paramount Domestic Television from January 1989 to May 1994, was able to pick from CBS, ABC or Fox affiliates (the affiliate makeup of the short-lived 2013–14 revival co-distributed by Tribune Broadcasting and CBS Television Distribution (now CBS Media Ventures) consisted mainly of Fox, CW and MyNetworkTV stations). When CBS's Late Show with David Letterman and Fox's infamously short-lived The Chevy Chase Show debuted in September 1993, ratings for Hall's program declined as it lost a large number of affiliates and was shifted to undesirable later timeslots on stations that kept it, resulting in Arsenio leaving the air at the end of the 1993–94 season. There has not been a successful syndicated late night talk show since then, and outside of the panel-formatted Comics Unleashed and the 2010s Arsenio revival, the few that have debuted since the 1998 failure of The Magic Hour have lacked full national distribution or been limited to weekend timeslots.

==== Local scheduling ====
In previous years, network late-night programs were often subject to delay by some "Big Three" affiliates to accommodate syndicated programming in their post-late news slot, allowing them to generate additional revenue from local advertising sales. CBS was particularly susceptible to affiliates preempting or delaying its late night programming from the 1970s through the early 1990s, partly due to its meager performance in the time period prior to the September 1993 debut of the Late Show with David Letterman (when stations that had previously chosen not to clear the late night lineup in pattern began carrying the program in its assigned 11:35 p.m. ET timeslot). While Fox's pre-1994 late night efforts generally were carried in pattern (at 11:00 p.m. ET/PT), the mid-1990s affiliation switches of several former Big Three affiliates—led by those acquired by New World Communications and SF Broadcasting—to the network saw affected stations in the Central, Mountain and Hawaii–Aleutian time zones delay the network's Saturday late night efforts by a half-hour to accommodate local 10:00 p.m. CT/MT/HT newscasts (many as part of an expanded 90-minute late news block, though KDFW/Dallas–Fort Worth, KTBC/Austin and KTVI/St. Louis, which later became Fox O&Os, would later cut their Saturday late news lineup to just their prime time newscasts); during its 1995–2010 run, this put MADtv in direct competition with NBC's Saturday Night Live, which typically overlapped with it in the latter's 11:30 p.m. ET timeslot. (Affected Eastern Time Zone Fox affiliates moved their late news exclusively to the final hour of prime time, out of competition with their Big Three competitors, allowing its Saturday late-night programming to air at its intended time.)

NBC—which preferred that its stations carry as much of its programming as possible and was less tolerant of preemptions than its rivals—has largely had its stations carry The Tonight Show in its network-designated timeslot. Yet despite the program's success during that timeframe, a handful of affiliates (including KARE/Minneapolis–St. Paul, WVTM/Birmingham and WTMJ/Milwaukee) had delayed The Tonight Show during the Carson and, except for WTMJ, early Leno eras to run syndicated sitcom reruns immediately following the late news, instead of in-between Tonight and its lead-out network programs, as was common between the late 1970s and the 1990s. WTMJ (which had delayed it by a half-hour to air Maude reruns, despite the network vetoing the move, in 1979) began preempting Tonight outright in September 1984, amid a dispute with NBC over the station's request to delay it by an hour so it could air reruns of Trapper John, M.D. after its 10:00 p.m. news; NBC contracted independent station WVTV (now a CW affiliate) to air Tonight, running there for four years until WTMJ agreed to air the program at its normal time in 1988. Though the few NBC and CBS stations that had delayed Tonight and the Late Show had gotten around to airing them in pattern by 1999, many continued to air their post-midnight network shows (such as Late Night and The Late Late Show) on a delayed basis—usually running a half-hour behind schedule—as late as 2004. Houston NBC affiliate KPRC notably delayed Late Night with Conan O'Brien to 2:40 a.m. when it resumed carrying the program after a two-year absence in 1996, in favor of airing various first-run syndicated shows and a rebroadcast of its 10:00 p.m. newscast between it and Tonight. O'Brien used this anomaly as the basis for a classic 1997 on-location piece in which he made impromptu stops throughout the city to watch an episode of his own show during its local graveyard slot; the station moved Late Night to 12:35 a.m. in 1998, and finally to its network-designated 11:35 p.m. CT slot in 2004.

Several ABC stations continued to run syndicated sitcom reruns and entertainment newsmagazines in the post-local news slot well into the 2000s, and at least three of them (WISN/Milwaukee, KITV/Honolulu and KOAT/Albuquerque) carried hour-long local newscasts for even longer, delaying part or all of the network's late-night lineup as late as one hour behind their intended airtime. This would pose an issue for Jimmy Kimmel Live! when it debuted in 2003, as the practice stunted the show early on (making the "Live!" title somewhat of a misnomer), although its ratings markedly improved over the next decade, eventually placing behind Tonight and the Late Show (and just ahead of ABC stablemate Nightline). ABC would gradually get its stations on board to airing Kimmel and Nightline in their designated timeslots into the 2010s, even after both shows traded slots in January 2013; Hearst Television was the last of ABC's major affiliate groups to end the practice of delaying its network late-night schedule in January 2019, per the terms of a renewed affiliation agreement that forced them to give up their ability to delay the program for extended local newscasts or syndicated programming.

=== Typical format ===
These shows often follow the same canonical format:

- a stand-up comedy segment, called the monologue in which the host makes news satire;
- several sketch comedy, sketches, or other comedy bits;
- interviews with one or two celebrity guests;
- a musical guest or stand-up comedy act.

There have been deviations from this format. Tom Snyder employed a more intimate concept on Tomorrow (NBC, 1973–81) and his 1995–99 run as the original host of The Late Late Show, conducting one-on-one interviews (alternating between hard-hitting questions and personal observations closely resembling genuine conversations) and choosing not to have a studio audience, house band, writing staff or scripted pieces. This style would be replicated for the original format of Later (NBC, 1988–2001), which had original host Bob Costas and occasional guest hosts interview a single guest for the entire half hour (condensed from a 45-minute to one-hour conversation taped in real time), and to an extent for the syndicated Whoopi Goldberg Show (1992–93) and Lauren Hutton and... (1995–96). Charlie Rose (1991–2017) and Tavis Smiley (2004–17), which were syndicated to public television stations (particularly PBS member stations), also mirrored the Snyder/Costas formulae, while featuring a wider range of guests including athletes; politicians; authors; businesspersons; and scientists.

Tomorrow, despite opposition from Snyder to the overhaul that coincided with its expansion from 60 to 90 minutes, incorporated elements of the entertainment talk format and, for a time, entertainment reports by gossip columnist Rona Barrett (who quit as Snyder's co-host one year later amid acrimony between the two) for what became the final 17 months of its run from 1980 to 1981. Later would also adopt a more conventional late-night format—while maintaining the single-guest interview setup—after Greg Kinnear took over as host in February 1994 (continuing after it switched long-term to enlisting guest hosts when Kinnear quit in 1996 to pursue a movie career), but reverted to the Costas-era format in 2000 under final host Cynthia Garrett; though Later ended in January 2001, the banner title remained for one more year to present edited repeats of the 1976–84 Canadian sketch comedy series SCTV (which previously aired after The Tonight Show on Fridays from 1981 to 1983) in the talk show's former timeslot. Except for a two-year period beginning in 2007, Last Call with Carson Daly (NBC, 2002–19) had traditionally avoided monologues and comedy bits, although it originally utilized most major elements of the traditional late-night talk format; in 2009, the show deviated even further from the traditional format by taping all hosted and interview segments on-location (the former of which served merely as wraparounds as Daly did not interview the guests) and shooting all interviews and musical performances in the style of a documentary.

Late night talk shows often incorporate political satire, and several programs of the genre are formatted around political and pop culture-focused topical humor instead of featuring interviews, and music and stand-up comedy performances. Notable examples include The Daily Show (Comedy Central, 1996–present), The Colbert Report (Comedy Central; 2005–14), Last Week Tonight with John Oliver (HBO, 2014–present), Gutfeld! (Fox News; 2015–present), and Full Frontal with Samantha Bee (TBS, 2016–22). The Daily Show is a satire of evening news programs that initially mixed political and pop culture satire during its first three years under original host Craig Kilborn, transitioning to a more political focus—subsequent to Jon Stewart replacing Kilborn—in 1999, which earned acclaim with viewers and critics; the program inspired similar satirical news shows (some of which have been hosted by Daily Show alumnae) such as The Colbert Report, a spin-off that parodied political talk shows with host Stephen Colbert's in-show persona mocking conservative talk show hosts and televised political pundits more broadly, and Last Week Tonight with John Oliver, which offers a satirical "week-in-review" commentary as well as a seriocomic topical "main story" of interest taking deeper dives into various systemic issues.

Red Eye (Fox News, 2007–17), Last Call (first-run syndication, 1994–95; no relation to the now-defunct NBC program), and both of Bill Maher's late-night discussion shows, Politically Incorrect (Comedy Central, 1993–96; ABC, 1996–2002) and Real Time (HBO, 2004–present), have used a round table format that incorporates a mix of news discussion and satire, although roundtable is only used in the descriptive sense; in the case of Red Eye, some guests appeared on the program via satellite, while a regular on the show appeared from another part of the Fox News studios. (By contrast, Gutfeld!, hosted by former Red Eye moderator Greg Gutfeld and converted from a Saturday-only to a weeknightly program in March 2021, hews somewhat closer to a traditional late-night talk format—continuing in that structure even after it was moved to a late prime time slot in July 2023—albeit while incorporating conservative commentary.)

The traditional late-night talk format has largely been unable to maintain a long-term presence on American Spanish-language television; however a few efforts aimed at Hispanic and Latino audiences have been attempted over the years, including A Oscuras Pero Encendidos ("In the Dark but Turned On"; Galavisión, 1997–2000 and Telemundo, 2000–01), the first to be produced for and longest to air on American Spanish media, which originated in 1995 on independent WJAN-CA/Miami before going national in its third season; Mas Vale Tarde ("It's Better Late"; Telemundo, 2007–08); and Noche de Perros ("Dog Night"; Telefutura, 2011–12). (Interestingly, talk shows that have been produced for Estrella TV's prime time lineup—including Noches con Platanito ("Nights with Platanito", 2015–19), Nos Cayó la Noche con Alex Montiel ("Nightfall"; 2020) and Tu-Night con Omar Chaparro (2020–22)—have borrowed most elements of the format.)

=== House bands ===
Most shows in this genre have a house band that plays musical interludes. Late-night talk shows are the last television format to still use house bands, which were common during the Golden Age of Radio on most variety shows and sitcoms but largely faded away in most formats other than variety and late-night in the 1950s. (Variety shows as a standalone format themselves fell out of favor in the 1970s.)

Popular late night band leaders include Paul Shaffer, leader of the World's Most Dangerous Band during David Letterman's tenures on Late Night and the Late Show, where it was known as the CBS Orchestra; Doc Severinsen, leader of the NBC Orchestra for the majority of Johnny Carson's tenure on The Tonight Show and a member of the franchise's original band under its first host, Steve Allen; Max Weinberg, leader of The Max Weinberg 7 on Late Night and The Tonight Show Band on The Tonight Show during Conan O'Brien's tenures on both shows; Cleto and the Cletones (renamed The Cletones following original bandleader Cleto Escobedo III’s death in November 2025) on Jimmy Kimmel Live!; Branford Marsalis and Kevin Eubanks, leaders of The Tonight Show Band during Jay Leno's tenure on Tonight; The Roots, an eclectic hip-hop band turned host-band for Jimmy Fallon's tenures on Late Night and The Tonight Show; and Jon Batiste and Stay Human (renamed The Late Show Band under the direction of successor bandleader Louis Cato in 2022), the house band for Stephen Colbert's iteration of The Late Show.

Usually the band leader is a major part of the show, and the band leader and host often exchange playful banter during the monologue and comedy segments; the band leader has thus taken over the part of being the host's sidekick, which in the past was played by an announcer or designated co-host (such as Ed McMahon and Andy Richter). Paul Shaffer was well known for being a straight man to David Letterman on Late Night and the Late Show. Mort Lindsey was the official bandleader of The Merv Griffin Show, but trumpeter (and established comic and voice actor) Jack Sheldon shared most of the comic material and banter with host Merv Griffin. However, on The Tonight Show with Conan O'Brien, Max Weinberg rarely spoke during the show, and his interactions with O'Brien were often short and awkward—a running gag on the show (Richter, now the announcer, was O'Brien's primary sidekick on The Tonight Show and carried on in that role on Conan, whereas new band leader Jimmy Vivino has barely any interaction with O'Brien), and Kevin Eubanks was often the butt of Leno's jokes, particularly regarding drug-related stories.

Most notably The Late Late Show with Craig Ferguson did not have a house band, and Ferguson often used that fact as a running gag in his show; Ferguson used a robot named Geoff Peterson as his sidekick (The Late Late Show had never had a house band under hosts Tom Snyder, Craig Kilborn and Ferguson, but with James Corden's assumption of hosting duties, the program featured a house band led by Reggie Watts). Late Night with Seth Meyers—which had employed a band since its February 2014 debut, like the franchise's predecessors dating back to original host David Letterman—laid off The 8G Band (led mainly by actor/comedian Fred Armisen since Meyers, who previously worked with him when they were cast members on Saturday Night Live, took over as host) in June 2024, as part of budget cuts coinciding with a four-year renewal of Meyers' contract; in September 2024, the show began utilizing prerecorded music composed by the band for its opening and closing themes, and segment intros and outros.

=== Announcers ===
Often, the show's announcer is also a major part of the show, sometimes serving as a de facto sidekick to the host or participating in comedy bits. Famous announcers include Gene Rayburn and Hugh Downs (both from the early years of The Tonight Show, with the latter taking over as host when Jack Parr suddenly walked off the show); Ed McMahon (The Tonight Show Starring Johnny Carson); Edd Hall and John Melendez (both of The Tonight Show with Jay Leno); Bill Wendell and Alan Kalter (both of the Late Show with David Letterman); Joel Godard (Late Night with Conan O'Brien); Dicky Barrett (Jimmy Kimmel Live!); Steve Higgins (from the Jimmy Fallon eras of Late Night and The Tonight Show); Andy Richter (on both The Tonight Show with Conan O'Brien and Conan); and Don Pardo and Darrell Hammond (of Saturday Night Live). (Note: Hammond was previously a repertory cast member on Saturday Night Live from 1995 to 2009; he succeeded Pardo as its announcer following the latter's death in 2014.) These announcers often have significant career accomplishments outside of their particular shows. Jen Spyra, who previously worked as a writer for the show, became the first female to serve as an announcer on a network late-night comedy/talk/variety program, when The Late Show with Stephen Colbert moved her to an off-screen announcing role in 2016.

== Other formats ==
=== Network variety and entertainment programming ===
Other late night programs on broadcast and cable television break the standard format. In October 1975, after the network decided to discontinue its Saturday reruns of The Tonight Show Starring Johnny Carson per Carson's request to instead air reruns periodically during the week to decrease his production workload, NBC replaced the weekend Tonight reruns with a new comedy-variety series, NBC's Saturday Night (permanently retitled Saturday Night Live beginning with its third season); the 90-minute program, which continues to air as of 2026 and has remained a staple of NBC's Saturday lineup even after the network (and its broadcast competitors) ceased producing original scripted prime time programming on that night in the mid-2000s, primarily features sketches performed by a repertory cast of comedians (referred to in its early seasons as the "Not Ready for Prime Time Players") and a celebrity guest host (who also performs a monologue following the opening sketch and title sequence) as well as live performances from a featured musical act. (Occasionally, the episode's musical guest also serves as the guest host.) The program inspired other sketch comedy-focused variety series, including a handful that aired in late night, such as Fridays (developed in 1980 as ABC's answer to SNL with a nearly identical format) and MADtv (which served as a partial direct competitor to SNL throughout its initial 1995–2010 run and was Fox's longest-running late night program to date).

During the 1970s and 1980s, CBS filled its late-night period with dramatic programming, primarily under the CBS Late Movie banner (which debuted in February 1972 as a replacement for The Merv Griffin Show following its return to syndication). Although the time slot did, indeed, feature movies, it also featured a mixture of previously broadcast dramas dating back to the 1960s (such as The Avengers, The Prisoner and Kojak) as well as first-run series (such as British imports Return of the Saint and The New Avengers). The CBS Late Movie block was eventually restructured as CBS Late Night in September 1985 (later revived in October 1989 following the cancellation of The Pat Sajak Show, which had replaced the block eight months earlier), featuring reruns of CBS series, imported and first-run programs. CBS incorporated more conventional first-run fare (such as Sajak and dating game show Personals) into its late night lineup between 1989 and 1992, though, outside of sketch comedy The Kids in the Hall (added as a Friday offering in September 1992, following a three-year, pay-cable run on HBO), most were unsuccessful against their competition on NBC and ABC, consistent with CBS's general underperformance in that timeslot from the 1970s through the early 1990s. The block was supplanted in March 1991 by Crimetime After Primetime, a rotating collection of original crime drama series (including several Canadian-originated productions) that lasted until the Late Show with David Letterman premiered in September 1993.

Networks have also run music programs in the time period, including NBC's The Midnight Special (which featured contemporary music performances conducted on a soundstage) and Friday Night Videos (which originally was formatted as a music video showcase, before evolving in 1991 into a variety program, eventually renamed Friday Night, featuring live music performances; celebrity interviews; stand-up comedy performances; movie reviews; viewer polls and comedy sketches, and finally to an exclusive stand-up comedy showcase format as Late Friday in 2000), and ABC's In Concert (which featured pre-recorded concert performances from various established and up-and-coming music acts).

NBC took a different approach to programming the overnight slot in September 1998; replacing the late newscast NBC Nightside, "NBC All Night" showcased repeats of selected late night, daytime and news programs. Episodes of The Tonight Show and Late Night from the previous week and weekly 90-minute classic episodes of Saturday Night Live (which followed the show's recent episodes in many markets) were prominent parts of the block, though rebroadcasts of Meet the Press (same-day), Dateline (up to one month behind) and even the daytime soap opera Sunset Beach (also on a same-day basis until the series ended in December 1999) were also featured. The "All Night" banner was retired in 2008 as repeats of NBC late-night shows were gradually replaced over the next few years by Poker After Dark (which was later canceled after its sponsor was ensnared in a bank fraud and money laundering case), a Saturday overnight block of lifestyle programs produced by sister company LXTV and, in the early 2010s, weeknight rebroadcasts of the fourth hour of Today (which follows a daytime talk format) and the CNBC financial program Mad Money. (In addition to the Sunday/early Monday Meet the Press replay and the Saturday LXTV block, NBC currently supplies weeknight rebroadcasts of the NBC News Now streaming newscast Top Story with Tom Llamas and, for stations that carry the syndicated talk show, The Kelly Clarkson Show to its affiliates during the early overnight slot.)

Among American Spanish-language media, three of the four major broadcast networks—Univision, Telemundo and Estrella TV—typically begin their late night programming with an hour-long network newscast that is separated into two half-hour programs (the first half, usually a rebroadcast of their flagship early-evening newscast, is preempted by local news on many stations, while the second half is treated as the main late broadcast); UniMás, the other major Spanish-language network, does not carry news programming in any form (despite sharing ownership with sister network Univision's in-house news division). Other than Estrella TV (which airs paid programming for the rest of the night), the late night and overnight dayparts on the major Spanish-language networks are otherwise filled by reruns of telenovelas and other entertainment programs (Telemundo, in particular, airs same-night repeats of its prime time serials on weeknights), movies or infomercials (both latter formats air on Telemundo and UniMás, with movies being limited to weekends on those two networks). Sports news/talk programs—often prominently covering soccer with supplemental coverage of other domestic sports, and serving as counterparts to ESPN's SportsCenter and local sports "wrap-up" shows that follow late-evening weekend newscasts on many stations—have also been produced for the late night slot on the major Spanish networks, including Contacto Deportivo ("Contact Sports"; Telefutura/UniMás, 2002–2019; Univision, 2015–present), Titulares Telemundo ("Telemundo Headlines"; Telemundo, 1999–2019) and its spinoff Titulares y Mas: Zona Mixta ("Headlines and More: Mix Zone"; Telemundo, 2005–present).

=== News ===
==== National newsmagazines and late-night newscasts ====
ABC's Nightline has long been an exception to the networks' "comedy/variety" formula. Debuting in March 1980 (although it traces its roots to a series of half-hour special reports on the Iran hostage crisis that began in November 1979), the nightly half-hour newsmagazine originally aired immediately after local newscasts on ABC's owned and affiliated stations for its first 32 years, before being pushed to a later slot in January 2013, when it switched timeslots with the hour-long Jimmy Kimmel Live!. Under original anchor Ted Koppel, Nightline (which was based out of Washington, D.C. throughout his tenure) maintained a single-topic format, featuring live interviews related to the subject discussed in the main story segment. Following Koppel's 2005 retirement, the program began employing multiple anchors (first consisting of Martin Bashir and Cynthia McFadden in New York City, and Terry Moran in Washington); began featuring two or three topics per broadcast (similar to the format attempted during its short-lived expansion to a one-hour broadcast in 1983); and incorporated pop culture-related pieces alongside stories on current news events, interviews and investigative features. (Episodes focusing on a single topic continue to air occasionally; the program's anchors—which, since 2013, are based entirely out of New York—have since been assigned to rotating duties each night.) The program inspired CBS to create the similarly formatted America Tonight, debuting in October 1990, as a direct competitor to Nightline. Despite employing a top-tier slate of anchors that included Dan Rather (then anchor of the CBS Evening News), Charles Kuralt (then host of CBS News Sunday Morning) and Lesley Stahl (who also served as a correspondent for 60 Minutes), America Tonight failed to make a dent against Nightline and NBC rival The Tonight Show, resulting in its cancellation after only six months in March 1991.

Predating the debut of Nightline, ABC and CBS each offered late-night newscasts in the form of abbreviated, 15-minute weekend broadcasts. Fed to affiliates starting at 11:00 p.m. ET, the ABC News Weekend Report (debuting in 1965 as the ABC Weekend News, and airing on Saturday and Sunday nights) and the CBS Sunday Night News (debuting in 1963) were usually shown immediately following local late-evening newscasts on their owned and affiliated stations; however, some stations opted to air them as filler programming leading into their regular sign-off period. Declining interest from affiliates (stemming in part from the presence of 24-hour cable news channels such as CNN) and low viewership (mainly resulting from fewer affiliates airing them in their intended late fringe timeslots) resulted in both networks discontinuing their weekend late newscasts during the 1990s: ABC's Weekend Report ended in September 1991, while CBS's Sunday Night News aired its final broadcast in September 1997.

The three major English-language networks have also ventured into overnight newscasts that air after the traditional late night schedules; airing as a continuous feed of looping 60- to 90-minute-long blocks (intended for affiliates to air in repeated fashion until their next designated broadcast day begins), stations typically preempt some portion of the rolling broadcasts to air local, acquired or paid programming following the network late night shows. (Note: Continuous loop feeds of overnight and early-morning network newscasts are intended to allow any later updates to story items to be inserted into rebroadcasts aired in regions from the Mountain Time Zone westward, and, in the case of early-morning newscasts, are used as filler for affiliates that do not offer local morning news or continue to start them after 5:00 a.m. local time. Loop feeds of overnight network newscasts usually start at 1:00 a.m. ET by default, and are provided to each time zone until 5:00 a.m. local time; loop feeds of early-morning network newscasts usually start at 3:00 or 3:30 a.m. ET (as of 2017), and are provided until national morning shows begin at 7:00 a.m. local time.) NBC premiered the first overnight network news effort in July 1982 with NBC News Overnight, an hour-long program that mixed hard news features with incisive topical commentary and light-hearted feature stories; it aired for 18 months until high production costs and limited ad revenue led to the show being discontinued in December 1983. CBS followed in October 1982 with CBS News Nightwatch, which maintained a hybrid traditional newscast and interview/debate format (and, for its first two years, allowed affiliates to include local news updates during the program).

More conventional overnight network newscasts debuted in the early 1990s to fill airtime on major network affiliates that had adopted or were planning to adopt 24-hour program schedules to compete with increased late-night offerings on cable television and more specifically CNN, which was lauded for its round-the-clock coverage of the Gulf War in early 1991. During the 1991–92 television season, the "Big Three" networks each premiered their own overnight newscasts: NBC Nightside (debuting in November 1991 as a production of the Charlotte-based NBC News Channel affiliate video service, and the only overnight network newscast ever to air seven nights a week), ABC's World News Now (debuting in January 1992 as a more conventional newscast, which soon evolved into a more laid-back format, mixing serious news with features and some ad-libbed and intentional humor), and CBS's Up to the Minute (debuting in March 1992 as a replacement for Nightwatch, consisting of a mix of hard news, weather and sports segments as well as feature reports originated on the CBS Evening News and CBS News Sunday Morning). Many stations, including some Big Three affiliates, also filled overnight timeslots with syndicated rolling news blocks from CNN Headline News (until its evening and overnight rolling news blocks were replaced with talk shows in 2005) and All News Channel (until its closure in September 2002)—either in conjunction with or in place of late-night network newscasts—during the 1990s and much of the 2000s. (Headline News (now HLN and maintaining a true crime-focused entertainment format) had been syndicating its newscasts to local stations for broadcast in various timeslots since its January 1982 launch.)

As of 2025, World News Now is the only overnight newscast that debuted in 1991–92 which continues to air. NBC replaced Nightside with the "NBC All Night" entertainment block in September 1998; however in September 2017, the network began offering its early-morning news program Early Today (which replaced predecessor NBC News at Sunrise in September 1999) as a de facto overnight newscast, after its live telecast and loop feeds were moved into the slot previously filled by rebroadcasts of CNBC's Mad Money to accommodate local morning newscasts that expanded into the 4:00 a.m. hour in some markets during the 2010s. (The practice of network newscasts originally intended for broadcast in the designated early morning daypart—Early Today and predecessor Sunrise, CBS News Mornings (Note: Debuting in 1982 as the CBS Early Morning News, and later titled CBS Morning News from 1987 to 2024.) and ABC's Good Morning America First Look (Note: Debuting in 1982 as ABC News This Morning, and later titled World News This Morning from 1983 to 2006 and America This Morning thereafter until 2024.)—bleeding into the tail end of the overnight slot dates to the late 1990s, when stations started expanding their morning news shows into the 5:00 a.m. half-hour for the convenience of pre-dawn commuters.) CBS replaced Up to the Minute in September 2015 with CBS Overnight News, featuring a mix of segments repurposed from the previous day's edition of the CBS Evening News/CBS Weekend News, updated news summaries and additional content; Overnight News was replaced in May 2024 by CBS News Roundup, a more conventional broadcast produced by co-owned streaming network CBS News 24/7 (which partially simulcasts the program and airs the loop feed one hour before it is made available to local CBS stations) incorporating reports filed by correspondents from CBS News and local CBS-owned stations.

Most of the major Spanish-language networks have also offered conventional news programming in the late fringe slot. Univision debuted an 11:30 p.m. ET edition of its flagship news program Noticiero Univision—titled for most of its history as Noticiero Univision: Edición Nocturna ("Univision News: Late Edition"), and currently the longest-running network late news show on American Spanish-language television—in September 1989; the half-hour preceding the newscast's late edition was occupied from 1998 to 2019 by Primer Impacto Extra, a condensed half-hour version of the late afternoon tabloid newsmagazine Primer Impacto ("First Impact"), and since September 2019 by a rebroadcast of Noticiero Univision's main 6:30 p.m. ET broadcast. Telemundo, which previously offered a late-night newscast from 1987 to 2011, resumed national news programming in the slot in March 2020; initially conceived as a specialized half-hour newscast focusing on the COVID-19 pandemic and its impact on the country's Hispanic/Latino community, the one-hour news block utilizes the same structure as Univision's late news format (a rebroadcast of the main early-evening edition of Noticias Telemundo in the first half-hour and a live late edition in the second half-hour). Estrella TV has long had a one-hour jump on Univision and Telemundo in airing its flagship late-evening newscast, Cierre de Edición ("Final Edition"), in the final half-hour of prime time (10:30 p.m. ET), from the network's launch in September 2009 until September 2024; it would follow its rivals' lead with its own late fringe news offering in January 2022, debuting an hour-long block of its secondary newscast 24 Horas ("24 Hours")—which originated on co-owned streaming news channel Estrella News—as a companion broadcast to Cierre de Edición, utilizing the same part-taped/part-live structure as Univision and Telemundo's late newscasts. Both newscasts—the latter having eliminated its weekend editions by that time—were moved up by a half-hour to form an hour-long, late-primetime news block in September 2024.

==== Local news ====
Late-night local newscasts are traditionally broadcast at 11:00 p.m. ET/PT (10:00 p.m. in all other time zones) on most CBS, NBC and ABC stations, and various other network and independent stations (including O&Os and some affiliates of Fox, The CW, Univision and Telemundo). Originally lasting typically for 15 (until the 1960s) and later 30 minutes (although some non-Big Three stations presently air theirs at that length), the 35-minute late news format became the industry norm starting with NBC's move of The Tonight Show to 11:35 p.m. ET/PT in September 1991, which allowed stations to use the five extra minutes of local airtime to run more story packages and commercials. (Note: NBC conducted a trial of the expanded 35-minute late news format in early 1991 on affiliates KSDK/St. Louis and KXAS-TV/Dallas–Fort Worth (the latter is now an NBC owned-and-operated station). NBC stations continue to maintain the 30-minute runtime for their Saturday 11:00/10:00 newscasts as the network chose not to accordingly move Saturday Night Live from its existing 11:30 p.m. ET start upon shifting its weekday late-night schedule.) (Starting in the late 2000s, some English-language stations began offering hour-long weekend editions of their late newscasts, replacing local Sunday sports shows in some cases.) Most Fox, CW, MyNetworkTV and independent stations and select multicast network outlets (mainly MeTV affiliates) air a 30-minute to one-hour late newscast during the final hour of prime time—10:00 p.m. ET/PT (9:00 p.m. in other areas)—which may be produced in-house (in which case, on certain stations, it may be followed by an additional half-hour or hour-long newscast in the traditional late news slot) or outsourced to a local Big Three station, and often employs a larger story selection than their similarly formatted counterparts on major-network stations. Washington, D.C. independent WTTG (now a Fox owned-and-operated station) was the first American television station to debut a regular local prime time newscast (in 1966); however, New York City sister station WNEW-TV (now Fox O&O WNYW) is credited with popularizing the concept, having launched its own 10:00 p.m. newscast in March 1967. (Note: Although WTTG holds the distinction of debuting the nation's first regularly scheduled prime time newscast, some affiliates of NBC, CBS and ABC (such as WTAE-TV/Pittsburgh and present-day Fox affiliate WDAF-TV/Kansas City) experimented with airing local newscasts in the 10:30/9:30 slot during the 1950s and 1960s, before settling uniformly in the traditional 11:00/10:00 late news slot.) Other large- and mid-market independents (such as WNEW's New York-area rivals WPIX and WWOR-TV; KTTV, KTLA and KCOP-TV in Los Angeles; WGN-TV in Chicago; and WTCN-TV and KMSP-TV in Minneapolis–St. Paul) launched their own newscasts in the 10:00/9:00 hour through the 1970s and 1980s, although the concept gained momentum during Fox's expansion in the early 1990s as the network pushed its stations to offer local newscasts and aligned with several former ABC, CBS and NBC affiliates. (Note: During the "early prime time" network scheduling experiments of the 1990s, all five participating Northern California stations (NBC affiliates KRON-TV/San Francisco (now a CW affiliate) and KCRA-TV/Sacramento, and CBS affiliates KPIX-TV/San Francisco (now a CBS O&O), KOVR in Sacramento and KMST-TV (now KION-TV)/Monterey) moved their late-night newscasts from 11:00 p.m. to 10:00, in an attempt to reap higher ratings and advertising revenue from the earlier schedule, to varying outcomes; of these, only KOVR (which adopted the earlier 7:00–11:00 schedule for their prime time and late news programs after switching from ABC to CBS in 1995) continues the practice to this day.)

Local newscasts airing in the slot usually provide newer top stories and follow-ups of stories from earlier that day; breaking news stories occurring prior to airtime; in-depth feature segments (such as investigative and human-interest reports; stories focusing on criminal justice, socioeconomic and government issues; and occasional interviews); special coverage of local and national elections when held; national and international news (usually reserved for notable headlines or presented as a general summary, though longer-form prime time newscasts tend to cover them in more detail); weather reports with an emphasis on next-day forecasts; and highlights of the day's sporting events. On some stations, the newscast may run a 10- or 11-minute "non-stop" first segment (slightly longer than those shown during newscasts aired in other dayparts) and, on Sunday nights (though some air them as weekend-only or nightly shows), may be followed by an extended sportscast—often structured as a separate "sports extra" program, some of which focus mainly on football and baseball action—providing game recaps, sports news headlines and commentary. Since they commonly air at the start of the watershed slot, late-night newscasts have more editorial freedom to cover stories of a more violent, profane or sexual nature compared to those in earlier timeslots. The idiom "film at 11" comes from the now-archaic term once used to close promotions for the upcoming newscast that are shown during prime time programs, promising shots from a breaking story during the 11:00 p.m. newscast; the phrase—dating to when news footage was shot on film and had to be transported back to the station to be edited before broadcast—has since been substituted by similar idioms like "story at 11" or "details at 11" as the advent of videotape and later digital video, and technological advances in remote broadcasting saw these become the chosen mediums for packaging televised reports more efficiently and instantaneously.

Local news programs have also aired in the overnight slot in various formats; between the 1960s and the mid-1980s, many stations carried "sign-off edition" newscasts of varying length—usually running between five and 15 minutes (sometimes lasting up to a half-hour, as was the case with Chicago independent WGN-TV's Nightbeat, which followed the station's early late-night movie presentations from 1958 to 1983)—that provided brief summaries of local (and more prominently), national and international headlines, sports scores and a short- to medium-range weather forecast (often presented using slides and narrated by a station announcer). Independent stations WFLD/Chicago and KTTV/Los Angeles (now both Fox O&Os) experimented with teletext to serve a similar purpose in the early 1980s; notably, WFLD utilized the KeyFax service (partially owned by then-WFLD parent Field Enterprises) for its teletext news service Nite-Owl, which aired until the resumption of regular programming each day from 1981 to 1982, when Keyfax began an attempt to reposition itself as a two-way information service that ended in 1986. Since then, at least four other stations have offered live newscasts past the traditional late news slot: ABC affiliate KSTP-TV/Minneapolis–St. Paul (which ran an overnight news block, featuring rotating half-hours of live locally produced newscasts and All News Channel simulcasts, from March 1990 to October 1994), (Note: KSTP and All News Channel were both owned by St. Paul-based Hubbard Broadcasting, which operated the latter through CONUS Communications (a subsidiary cooperative news video-sharing service that operated from 1986 to 2002) in a joint venture with Viacom.) Fox affiliates WXIX-TV/Cincinnati (which ran a half-hour midnight newscast from its news department's October 1993 launch until September 1995) and KTVI/St. Louis (which launched an 11:00 p.m. newscast, the first to regularly air on a Central Time Zone station, in January 2016), and CW affiliate KWGN-TV/Denver (which also aired an 11:00 p.m. newscast, the first to regularly air on a Mountain Time Zone station, from September 2016 to July 2021).

Beginning in the early 1980s, many stations (mainly major network affiliates) offered rebroadcasts of their late-evening newscasts, intended primarily for the convenience of late-shift workers who were not awake hours earlier for the broadcast's initial airing, and in many cases, acting as replacements for the "sign-off edition" broadcasts. (During severe weather situations, live cut-ins are sometimes inserted in place of weather segments from the initial broadcast to provide updates on active storms.) Late-night news rebroadcasts declined in prevalence during the 2000s (partly due to local news websites, including station-managed sites, and cable news channels filling their intended purpose), being replaced by syndicated programs, extended feeds of overnight network newscasts and infomercials; in 2021 however, NBC's decision to turn over the 1:35 a.m. ET timeslot (which the network had begun regularly programming since the now-defunct Later premiered in August 1988) to its stations following the cancellation of A Little Late with Lilly Singh allowed some affiliates—including those that previously abandoned the practice—to offer late news rebroadcasts in the vacated slot as a lead-out to network late-night programs. Stations that employed the "24-Hour News Source" concept (which incorporated hourly newsbriefs throughout the broadcast day into the local advertising allotments of syndicated, network and non-news local shows) during the 1990s also produced live or prerecorded overnight updates, often employing on-duty production staff assigned to their local morning newscasts in lieu of station daytime and evening talent that would normally conduct the segments.

=== Local and syndicated programming ===
American television stations have used the late-night timeslot to feature syndicated programming designed for the time period, such as late-night talk shows intended to compete with their network counterparts and series (such as dating game shows) that incorporate more mature material; however, the daypart has also acted as a de facto "death slot" for syndicated programs that either were placed there involuntarily due to low ratings in their original daytime slots, a lack of room on their station's schedule to fit them in an appropriate timeslot where the program would otherwise benefit from a higher available audience, or to fill time that would otherwise be taken up by infomercials or reruns of current and past network shows (including sitcoms and drama series) distributed in off-network syndication.

Up through the 2000s, first-run syndicated programs most commonly seen in the overnight period consisted of daytime talk shows and game shows being burned off due to low ratings. Certain syndicated tabloid talk shows (such as Jerry Springer, The Steve Wilkos Show, Jenny Jones and The Morton Downey Jr. Show) have also aired in late night—most either in their primary or secondary daily runs—because of their adult content. Some stations—most prevalent when King World (since absorbed into what is now CBS Media Ventures) began offering carrier stations of The Oprah Winfrey Show the option of running late-night rebroadcasts of the show in 2001—have also offered same-day reruns of talk shows already carried in daytime slots (such as Katie, The Kelly Clarkson Show and The Jennifer Hudson Show) to reach audiences unable to watch them in their primary timeslot. (Incidentally, ABC's first late-night effort, The Les Crane Show, was the first program to follow the format known today as the "daytime talk show".) Talk shows had been satirized on late night television—including in syndication—long before shows like The Larry Sanders Show, Space Ghost Coast to Coast and The Colbert Report gained acclaim amongst audiences for their takes on the format. The first television talk show satire, the Norman Lear-created syndicated comedy Fernwood 2 Night (1977), itself a spin-off of the satirical soap opera Mary Hartman, Mary Hartman (1976–77), starred Martin Mull and Fred Willard in an irony-laden parody of late-night talk shows and locally produced fare found on midwestern American television at the time; the fictional show-within-a-show was retooled in-universe for its continuation series, America 2-Night (1978), changing it from a local Ohio program to a national show set in Southern California, making it more plausible for real-life celebrities to appear as themselves. The weekly syndicated late-night comedy Night Stand with Dick Dietrick (1995–97) parodied the tabloid talk format—which had reached its zenith in syndication during the late 1980s and 1990s with shows like Downey, Springer, Geraldo, and in its early years, Oprah—with the titular dimwitted host character (Timothy Stack, who also co-created the series) presiding over a fictional talk show that mocked the oft-exploitative and sensationalized nature of the format.

A brief influx of game shows began to fill the late night airwaves in the mid-to-late-1980s (such as Tom Kennedy's nighttime Price Is Right, The $1,000,000 Chance of a Lifetime, the syndicated version of Sale of the Century, the Bill Rafferty-hosted version of Card Sharks, and High Rollers), virtually all of which were cancelled after one season due to low ratings exacerbated by undesirable scheduling or declining station clearances. These shows were intended for prime time access slots but by that time, as game shows were saturating the syndication market, Wheel of Fortune and Jeopardy! (as well as magazine shows like PM Magazine and especially towards the end of the decade, Entertainment Tonight) had already cornered the access timeslot. From 1984 to 2007, the syndicated George Michael Sports Machine—produced out of and hosted by the titular then-sports director at Washington NBC O&O WRC-TV—featured highlights of sports events held before its initial Sunday late access airtime (where it was a staple of the time period) and interview-based feature segments; the program was syndicated by various distributors throughout its run (culminating in NBC Enterprises (now NBCUniversal Syndication Studios) assuming syndication rights in 2001), commonly airing as a lead-out to (and in later years, being displaced to later timeslots, if not dropped entirely, by) local sports news shows that followed Sunday night newscasts, primarily on NBC stations, in many markets.

During the 1990s and early 2000s, the dating game show also often filled late night slots in syndication. Two of the earliest successes were Love Connection (1983–94, 1998–99), which incorporated elements of the video dating concept popularized in the 1980s and featured contestants discussing the date they went on; and Studs (1991–93), a "question-and-answer" format that relied more heavily on sexual innuendo and double entendres. The dating game shows that debuted from 1998 onward (among them Blind Date, The 5th Wheel and ElimiDate) were known for often pushing the boundaries of sexually suggestive content on broadcast television, and therefore usually aired in late night on the vast majority of their carrier stations. Though the genre largely died off from syndication in 2006 (partly due to effects from tighter content restrictions enforced by syndicators after the Super Bowl XXXVIII halftime show controversy), it saw a resurgence in 2011 with the debuts of the elimination-style Excused and Who Wants to Date a Comedian?, followed by the 2012 sale of the Game Show Network series Baggage into syndication; this would prove to be short-lived, as all three shows would exit the syndication market in September 2013. The expansion of the entertainment news genre in syndication (influenced by genre pioneer Entertainment Tonight and beginning in earnest with the September 1993 premiere of Extra) starting in the early 1990s has also resulted in many first-run tabloid and infotainment programs (such as Access Hollywood and The Insider) occupying late night slots; while this is often because of a lack of available space in early access or prime access dayparts, some programs (like ET) offer an optional same-day rebroadcast—usually incorporating updated material to account for story developments that broke after or production errors that occurred during the initial broadcast feed—in a secondary late night slot.

==== Preemptions and deferences of network and syndicated programs ====
Network programs preempted by their owned and affiliated stations in favor of an irregularly scheduled special event, special programming of local interest (such as coaches' and team highlight shows shown during the prime access hour in markets with major sports teams), breaking news or severe weather coverage are typically rescheduled in overnight timeslots—often but not always during the same broadcast day—to fulfill their contractual programming obligations. Because of the genre's daily format and continuity structure, preempted episodes of daytime soap operas are typically rebroadcast the night of their airdate to allow viewers to catch up on storylines before the next episode. (Despite the 21st century proliferation of subscription streaming services such as Hulu, Paramount+ and Peacock, and network-run apps and video on demand services that enable network shows subjected to local preemption to be viewed at a later time, the rescheduling option continues as a means to allow viewers that either do not have access to those services or are unable to view recent episodes until as late as eight days after their initial airing due to network restrictions on day-after-air releases on VOD or streaming platforms to be able to record them for later viewing.)

In some cases, higher-profile syndicated programs (such as Jeopardy! and Wheel of Fortune) displaced from their regular daytime or early fringe slots for similar reasons have also been rescheduled in the overnight slot for the same purpose, allowing their carrier stations to fulfill obligations to air the program without penalty to the syndicator. Conversely, following its September 2009 conversion from a broadcast network to a syndication service, some affiliates of MyNetworkTV have pushed its schedule to late night or overnights full-time to make room for syndicated or local news programs in the service's normal two-hour weeknight prime time slot.

==== Movies ====
Movies, particularly films sold for the syndication market, have been a regular staple of late night programming since the 1950s. Until the late 1980s, many television stations offered nightly presentations of theatrical films in late night; during their respective heights, made-for-television films originally shown on network prime time television (beginning in the 1980s up through the early 2000s) and direct-to-video films (during the 1990s and 2000s) were sometimes featured in syndicated movie packages, especially those presented during the slot. Major network affiliates (mainly CBS and ABC stations) usually scheduled these presentations after the conclusion of their late local newscasts or following syndicated or, if cleared wholly or in part, network late-night offerings; NBC—whose affiliates did not have as much leeway to air movies until deeper into the night, if they signed off later or not at all, due to the presence of its late-night talk and variety block led by The Tonight Show and Saturday Night Live—syndicated a weekly movie package to its owned-and-operated stations and selected affiliates, the NBC Late Night Movie, which aired on Sunday nights following their late local newscasts from 1977 to 1984.

Stations that offered 24-hour programming in some capacity (either on weekends only or throughout the week) as early as the late 1970s often aired multiple films well into the overnight hours. Many public television stations (like WYIN/Gary, Indiana, the Oklahoma Educational Television Authority (OETA), KCET/Los Angeles and WNET/Newark–New York City) have long aired packages of older mainstream theatrical films—syndicated mainly by American Public Television—on weekends (usually Saturday nights) in late prime time and late night; these presentations, however, are regularly suspended during pledge drives held two to four times per year in favor of health and financial advice, and music specials normally shown in place of regular programming (except in daytime slots reserved for children's programming) during pledge periods.

One popular late night format found particularly among local stations has been the "midnight movie", showcases of low-budget genre films (particularly fantasy, sci-fi and horror movies) that typically aired on Friday or Saturday nights, often featuring comedy skits and sardonic commentary bookending the films, which has its origins in the 1954–55 film showcase The Vampira Show that aired on Los Angeles ABC owned-and-operated station KABC-TV. Some of the better-known late night hosted movie series have included Svengoolie in the Chicago market (WFLD, 1970–73 and 1979–86; WCIU-TV, 1994–present), Off Beat Cinema in Buffalo, New York (WKBW-TV, 1993–2012; WBBZ-TV, 2012–present), Big Chuck and Lil' John in Cleveland (WJW, 1979–2007), the Creature Double Feature in Boston (WLVI, 1972–83) and Philadelphia (WKBS-TV, 1976–79), and Elvira's Movie Macabre in Los Angeles (KHJ-TV (now KCAL-TV), 1981–86). (Of those mentioned, Svengoolie (since April 2011 on MeTV) and Off Beat Cinema (since 2008 on Retro TV) have also been distributed nationally.) Though traditionally found in late-night slots, some broadcasters have aired "midnight movie" packages—like Movie Macabre and the current incarnation of Svengoolie—in weekend prime time, sometimes accompanied by another genre film—whether broken up by late-evening news or not, making the second presentation a literal midnight movie—resulting in unique virtual double bills (such as Dr. Heckyl & Mr. Hype and The Night Evelyn Came Out of the Grave on Movie Macabre). Horror-themed late-night movie presentations largely disappeared from many broadcast stations by the 2000s, though B movies (mostly of a melodramatic nature) have continued to run in post–primetime slots.

By the 1990s, late-night movie presentations (and syndicated film packages in general) were primarily offered by Fox affiliates and independent stations (including those that would become affiliates of The WB and UPN as early as 1995), usually during the overnight graveyard slot, although some Big Three affiliates (such as ABC's owned-and-operated stations and Cleveland ABC affiliate WEWS) continued to offer them on weekends into the early 2000s in certain markets (some scattering in Pre-Code/Hays Code-era titles—often buried in overnight slots—well into the 1990s, even as cable networks like AMC and Turner Classic Movies were increasingly taking over the mantle of televising classic films). Movie packages sold through the commercial syndication market have steadily declined in volume since the late 1990s due largely to cable television cornering the film market, and the prime time expansions of The WB and UPN (and before that, Fox) during that decade reducing available airtime on their affiliates, and more substantially amid the proliferation of streaming platforms (like Netflix, Hulu and Prime Video) in the mid-2010s, as film studios increasingly resorted to licensing their library titles to that medium; syndicated reruns and paid programming primarily now occupy late-night schedules on most stations outside or in lieu of network offerings made for the broader daypart, although some of the stations (along with The CW's national small-market feed) that carry the few film packages remaining in syndication continue to run movies in that daypart on weekends. In the present day, late-night movie presentations on American broadcast television are otherwise found primarily on digital multicast networks such as Movies!, Bounce TV, Positiv, 365BLK, Outlaw and Grit.

==== Paid programming ====
Following the 1984 elimination of Federal Communications Commission (FCC) regulations (established in the 1950s and 1960s) prohibiting program-length advertising on television, the late-night slot has increasingly been used for infomercials, a type of direct-response advertisement (typically running 30 minutes in length, though a few have had one-hour runtimes) intended to promote or sell mail-order products or other services (such as cleaning products, housewares, fitness products and multi-level marketing services) that is paid for by the sponsor under time brokerage agreements. The concept of the program-length advertisement dates to the early years of modern commercial television: the first filmed half-hour infomercial for a commercial product was produced in 1949 by Ohio-based Cinécraft Productions for a Vitamix blender; first airing on New York City independent station WOR-TV (now Secaucus, New Jersey-licensed MyNetworkTV O&O WWOR-TV) in a Sunday 12:30 a.m. slot, an estimated 130 orders for the blender were made within 10 minutes of the infomercial's conclusion, and more than $41,400 in sales (equivalent to $560,000 in 2025) were generated after 12 airings of the broadcast.

Infomercials are usually structured under various concept formats including demonstration-based advertisements (highlighting the product in action), "storymercials" (fictional stories that use emotion as a draw to the product being marketed), "documercials" (news- or documentary-based formats typically selling higher-priced products), "brand demand" ads (usually demonstration-based and pushes customers to purchase products by phone, Internet and retail outlets) and talk show-style ads (a low-budget format usually featuring a panel discussing the product or service). These advertisements generate additional revenue for stations on top of the conventional short-form advertising they sell to sponsors, and provide them an inexpensive programming source to fill airtime as opposed to purchasing additional syndicated content in lower-profile time periods. Although they are commonly associated with overnight programming, infomercials are used as filler by some television stations for other timeslots (mostly on weekends or in the morning) not reserved for scheduled network, syndicated or local programming.

Simulcasts of home shopping channels (such as the HSN syndication service Home Shopping Spree (later America's Store), Shop at Home Network and Jewelry Television) have also been used to fill overnight airtime, more commonly during the late 1980s and the first half of the 1990s. (A handful of stations—including a few small-market Fox and MyNetworkTV stations owned by Mission Broadcasting that run Jewelry Television programming overnights each day—continue to employ this practice.) Shopping channels began serving as overnight filler on local broadcast stations with the 1988 launch of the Home Shopping Club Overnight Service, which was primarily syndicated to independent stations and selected network affiliates; originally operating as a nine-hour-a-day service (from midnight to 9:00 a.m. ET), it evolved into a hybrid format as the Home Shopping Spree in 1989, broadcasting 24 hours a day on various low-power stations (which offered it on a full-time or part-time basis) alongside the existing overnight syndication package, a structure that continued until what became America's Store shut down in April 2007.

Although typically associated with the Sunday morning timeslot, primarily as a means to allow those who cannot attend church services in-person due to illness or disability to participate from home, some time-brokered televangelist programs (such as The Shepherd's Chapel, Inspiration Ministries Campmeeting and In Touch with Dr. Charles Stanley) are also carried by some commercial stations during the overnight graveyard slot, particularly during the pre-dawn hours on weekends.

==== Overnight sign-offs ====
For much of the early history of American television broadcasting until the 1980s, most television stations regularly signed off during the overnight hours each night for a predetermined period (typically from as early as 1:00 a.m. to as late as 6:00 a.m.), primarily due to technical constraints and, in earlier decades, the lack of demand or available viewership for stations to offer overnight programming. The sign-off was usually marked by a set sequence preceding the shutdown of the station's transmitter (including a video montage set to "The Star-Spangled Banner", a sermonette, and station announcements and technical information), usually concluded by a test pattern (such as the SMPTE color bars) that lasts for several minutes until the transmitter is powered down. One widely used sign-off sequence was "National Anthem", produced by New York-based graphics firm Saxton Graphic Associates, Ltd; accompanied by a trumpet-led arrangement of "The Star-Spangled Banner" performed by the London Festival Orchestra and conducted by Bob Sharples in 1963, it featured images highlighting important events in U.S. history, culminating with the iconic 1969 photograph of an Apollo 11 astronaut standing on the Moon by the American flag.

Most stations scaled back or completely discontinued the practice during the 1980s and 1990s, as the rise of modern cable television—which saw many basic and premium cable channels (following the lead of superstations like WTBS, WGN-TV and WOR-TV that were already offering round-the-clock schedules) begin switching to 24-hour-a-day programming or offering nighttime-only timeshare services in the early 1980s—increased demand for overnight programming. (Many independent stations and selected major network stations had offered 24-hour programming in some capacity as soon as the late 1970s.) However, some commercial and noncommercial stations (such as those owned by Citadel Communications and many PBS member stations) would continue to sign-off nightly or on weekends well into the 2000s, before they switched to round-the-clock broadcasts in the period surrounding the analog-to-digital transition.

Stations that transitioned to 24-hour broadcasts instead air many of the aforementioned programming formats during the overnight slot, although a scant few, particularly those that previously continued to sign-off overnight on weekends long after switching to 24-hour programming the rest of the week (such as Green Bay, Wisconsin ABC affiliate WBAY-TV, which ended this practice after a transmitter malfunction during one of its weekend sign-off periods kept it off the air for several days in January 2010), chose to fill their former off-hours with a "nightlight" feed of live radar imagery (displaying data sourced from National Weather Service- or station-operated radars) or, if applicable, a simulcast of a locally programmed weather channel (normally distributed by the station on an over-the-air subchannel, local cable providers or an online livestream). Public television stations, meanwhile, fill that time by either running PBS's National Program Service feed or some combination of local programming repeats and programs from outside distributors. In the present day, some stations (such as those owned by Nexstar Media Group and Gray Media) conduct a formal sign-on sequence—typically consisting solely of a national anthem montage—during the early morning (usually between 4:00 and 5:00 a.m.) to signify the start of the broadcast day; standard sign-off periods involving the temporary cessation of regular programming, meanwhile, are usually reserved for occasions where the transmitter is scheduled to undergo significant maintenance.

== Cable television ==
Some American cable channels (such as TNT, Nickelodeon/Nick at Nite, MTV and ESPN) maintain a round-the-clock schedule incorporating various entertainment programs (including theatrical films or reruns of original and acquired series) during the overnight hours; other channels (like FX, Syfy, Paramount Network and Freeform) offer blocks of infomercials and other paid programming (including televangelist programs normally scheduled closer to the start of the broadcast day) of varying length during overnight time periods. Same-night rebroadcasts of prime time programming are most commonly offered by cable news channels and sports networks (both national and regional), which are designed as a singular feed due to their focus on live programming, especially in the context of national networks that operate on an Eastern Time schedule. Many sports networks (such as ESPN, and the FanDuel Sports and NBC Sports regional networks) and even certain general entertainment cable networks with some sports offerings (like TNT) rebroadcast sporting events held the previous day during the overnight slot (for example, regional sports networks often rebroadcast a game involving a local major league sports team it holds the territorial rights to carry). Because of interregional time differences, live national and regional telecasts of professional and collegiate sporting events played at venues in the Western United States during the early evening (between 7:00 and 8:30 p.m. PT/MT) typically bleed—extending deeper in overtime situations—into the late or post-late fringe slots (between 11:30 p.m. and 2:00 a.m. ET) in the eastern half of the country. The late starts of Western games often contribute to a perceived coverage bias in sports news media towards teams based in the Eastern and Central states, where most evening games, outside of away games against opponents located in the West, are held when a majority of the population is still awake (starting within the late afternoon and early evening hours on the West Coast).

Cable news channels typically schedule rebroadcasts of their prime time news, talk and opinion programming after live broadcasts conclude for the day (at 12:00 a.m. ET), with the initial rebroadcast of their prime time block scheduled in correspondence with each program's advertised time in the Pacific Time Zone. (Live coverage is sometimes provided following the conclusion of regular live programming in the event of major breaking news, especially international events unfolding during the overnight hours in the U.S.) In contrast, business news channels CNBC (which otherwise carries reality/documentary reruns for most of the night) and Bloomberg Television start their live pre-opening bell programming late in the overnight slot to provide early analysis of major business headlines and global markets (focusing on American stock futures, and exchanges in Europe and Asia) going into the domestic trading day.

Live and tape-looped overnight newscasts that aired for years on Headline News and The Weather Channel were largely replaced by prime time repeats during the early years of the 21st century, although CNN has continued to offer regular late newscasts in some capacity (currently in the form of the Los Angeles-based The Story Is with Elex Michaelson on weeknights, and simulcasts of CNN International's overnight edition of CNN Newsroom on weekends). Headline News ended overnight news coverage in February 2005 to make way for a new nighttime talk show block, confining its longtime rolling news format to the morning and daytime hours; The Weather Channel (which, up through the mid-2000s, incorporated special forecast segments centering around West Coast, Alaskan and Hawaiian weather, and international travel conditions during its overnight coverage) gradually transitioned its nighttime schedule entirely to repeats of its prime time documentary programs between 2009 and 2013, culminating in the cancellation of the late night editions of Weather Center Live and limiting its weather news programming to mornings and weekday daytime hours. (Exceptions are made to allow for continuous storm coverage after normal live programming hours during significant severe weather and landfalling tropical cyclone events; Fox Weather, which airs tape-looped forecast programming—as do fellow weather news channels WeatherNation and AccuWeather Network (Note: WeatherNation, which maintains a "wheel" format that alternates national weather reports and prerecorded regional forecast segments at scheduled times each hour, usually broadcasts its national segments live during the daytime and evening hours. Programming on AccuWeather's cable and streaming networks, conversely, is largely prerecorded; segments on the linear AccuWeather Network and companion streaming channel AccuWeather Now are recycled throughout the broadcast day, with weather information periodically updated at various times.)—and weekend documentary shows overnights, also follows this practice.)

The late-night talk/variety show format, once exclusive to network television, began expanding to cable in the 1990s with HBO's Dennis Miller Live (1994–2002) and The Chris Rock Show (1997–2000), and Comedy Central's The Daily Show (starting under Jon Stewart's run as host) gaining success; other late night cable talk shows like The Colbert Report, Conan (TBS, 2010–21), Chelsea Lately (E!, 2007–14) and Watch What Happens Live with Andy Cohen (Bravo, 2009–present) have also proven successful in the early 21st century. However, late night talk/variety programs on cable have a slight advantage over their broadcast counterparts as most typically air at 11:00 p.m. ET, competing with late evening newscasts on most local broadcast stations and 35 minutes before the major networks begin their late night network programming. (However, a few shows that were developed for late night, like Real Time with Bill Maher, Full Frontal with Samantha Bee and Gutfeld!, have instead aired in the final hour of prime time under the conventions of common late-night programming formats.) These shows also have the advantage of not being subject to FCC guidelines relating to the broadcast of indecent material, though internal network standards—in the case of advertiser-supported cable channels—generally result in these shows not being much more ribald than their network counterparts.

Basic cable networks that participated in the Cable in the Classroom initiative, overseen by the NCTA (then the National Cable & Telecommunications Association) from 1989 to 2014, often scheduled educational programs intended for educators to record for later classroom use in late overnight/early morning slots (such as A&E Classroom, CNN Student News on CNN Headline News; Mr. Wizard's World, Nick News and Launch Box on Nickelodeon; and The Weather Classroom on The Weather Channel). Subscription-based (or "premium") channels run independent and older or obscure feature films (that either received home video, DVD or theatrical release, and which often have release lags spanning up to 30 years) during the overnight hours; these are sometimes interspersed with more recent mainstream films, specials and specials and original programs (both original late-night shows and reruns of other original scripted and alternative series) in that daypart. Some pay services embraced the rise of videocassette recorders in the 1980s and 1990s by promoting the use of recording overnight films for later viewing; The Movie Channel was one such adopter, as from 1986 to 2004, it carried a daily (later weekly) block originally called "VCR Theater" (later renamed "VCR Overnight" in 1988 and "TMC Overnight" in 1997).

=== Networks and programming blocks ===
Historically, cable television services have maintained timeshare services and programming blocks that broadcast primarily during the nighttime hours; two prominent nighttime-only cable-originated channels currently operate in the United States as of 2024.

Nick at Nite debuted over the channel space of parent network Nickelodeon in July 1985, as a collection of primarily reruns of older sitcoms and a limited selection of half-hour drama series from the 1950s and 1960s, along with nightly pre-1960s classic film presentations. Nick at Nite's schedule—which currently runs nightly from 8:00 p.m. to 6:30 a.m. ET—has evolved over the years, both to focus exclusively on sitcoms (as classic movies were dropped from the schedule in 1990 and dramas were permanently removed in 1997), to shift its programming timeline to accommodate more recent network sitcoms (with a current-day focus on comedies from the 1990s to the 2010s) and, by 2009, to include occasional airings of more recent movies in prime time; although it first dabbled in that arena in the early 1990s (with the short-lived On the Television and Hi Honey, I'm Home!), a limited slate of first-run original programs—like Fatherhood, See Dad Run, Glenn Martin, DDS and Instant Mom—was also offered from 2004 to 2018. Adult Swim debuted in September 2001 as a three-hour Sunday and Wednesday night block on Cartoon Network (which currently runs the block nightly from 5:00 p.m. to 6:00 a.m. ET), featuring a mix of original and acquired adult animated series and anime targeted at older teenagers and young adults; it quickly expanded to other nights (adopting a seven-night-a-week schedule in July 2007), and began incorporating live-action original programs in February 2007 (with the premieres of Tim and Eric Awesome Show, Great Job! and Saul of the Mole Men). Since the mid-2000s, Nielsen has been recording ratings for Nick at Nite (since 2004) and Adult Swim (since 2005) separately from their respective parent networks for demographic purposes.

As cable channels increased in number during the 1980s and 1990s, up until late in the latter decade, it was fairly common for two or more standalone networks (regardless of format category) to share space on a single channel; the duration during which each service occupied the shared channel varied, depending upon the amount of airtime reserved under the assigned channel or satellite transponder. Cable systems, in particular, compartmented multiple networks onto an assigned leased access-style timeshare channel to account for headend infrastructures of the era affording a relatively modest allotment of programmable channels (an issue that would be rectified by systemic headend upgrades allowing for the introduction of "expanded basic" and later digital cable service during the latter half of the 1990s); in such cases, local cable providers would typically switch between continuously running channel feeds once each network begins their assigned airtime slot.

Networks that have offered nighttime-only timeshare channel feeds or program blocks include USA Network, which carried Black Entertainment Television (BET) as a two-hour-long (later three-hour) Friday night block from January 1980 to August 1982 (USA also carried C-SPAN as a nine-hour daytime block from March 1979 to January 1982, and an early-morning leased simulcast of Bloomberg Television from July 1995 to December 2004); and the Financial News Network (merged with business news competitor CNBC in May 1991), which shared channel space with sports network Score—originally a nighttime and weekend service until September 1988, when FNN's introduction of a weeknight financial news and talk show block prompted Score to move exclusively to a weekend afternoon-to-evening schedule—from May 1985 to May 1991. (Note: Financial News Network and Score were known collectively as "FNN-Score" until the latter network was renamed FNN Sports in 1989.) During its first six years of operation, Nickelodeon leased transponder airtime to transmit The Movie Channel (from April to November 1979, as a part-time scrambled signal accessible only to the premium service's subscribers), the Alpha Repertory Television Service (ARTS) and its successor A&E (from April 1981 to February 1984 as ARTS, and until December 1984 as A&E) over its channel space during the network's nighttime off-hours; both The Movie Channel and A&E (created through the February 1984 merger of ARTS and competing film-and-arts cultural network/former premium service The Entertainment Channel) would eventually obtain full-time standalone satellite transponders to allow 24-hour-a-day transmissions.

Two early programming blocks were also among the first original cable programs produced for late night. Night Flight (USA Network, 1981–88; first-run syndication, 1990–96; IFC, 2018) was a visual arts magazine/variety program—airing for four hours on Friday and Saturday nights throughout its USA Network run—that showcased mainstream and alternative music videos (including videos from punk and New Wave acts), artist interviews, stand-up comedy sets, animation, B movies, documentaries and short films; the short-lived IFC version strayed from Night Flight's original format in that it was a 15-minute program that mixed excerpts from the original series with surreal footage from film, television and the Internet. (A subscription streaming service featuring content from the program's original 1981–88 run was launched in March 2016.) Night Tracks (TBS, 1983–92) was a music video program—also airing on Fridays and Saturdays, originally in two three-hour blocks for most of its run—developed to capitalize on the medium's emergence into the mainstream through the growing popularity of MTV in the early 1980s, which spun off several themed video countdown blocks (focusing on top-charting, dance, country, hard and alternative rock videos at various points) and served as the basis for one of the shortest-lived networks in American cable television history, Cable Music Channel, Turner Broadcasting System's unsuccessful attempt at an MTV competitor that operated for 35 days from October to November 1984; an overnight movie offshoot, Night Flicks (converted into a standalone showcase using the modified title Nite Flix in 1991), debuted in August 1989 and served as the lead-out for Night Tracks during the final three years of the music program's run. (Note: The addition of the Night Flicks movie block (which originally utilized the flagship show's theme music and announcers until it cut all ties to Night Tracks with the Nite Flix rebrand, and usually aired as a double feature on Friday/early Saturdays and a single feature on Saturday/early Sundays) came as TBS had begun reducing airtime for the Night Tracks video blocks during 1989 and 1990, prompted by declining viewership for the program amid a broader ratings slump for televised music videos around that time. The show's playlist, which had catered to a broader mix of genres for most of its run, was confined to alternative and hip-hop/rap videos in a last-ditch attempt to boost ratings in 1991.)

Attempting to build on the success of Nick at Nite's timeshare concept, some of Nickelodeon's sister channels offered their own targeted nighttime blocks during the 2000s and 2010s. Noggin, a channel co-founded by Nickelodeon (then owned by Viacom, whose namesake successor later resurrected the brand as a preschooler-targeted streaming service that operated from March 2015 until it was shuttered by successor Paramount Global in July 2024) and Sesame Workshop, launched in February 1999 with a nighttime "retro" block that mainly featured classic shows from Sesame Workshop's program library. In April 2002, the network revamped its schedule, discarding the retro block and relegating its programming for preschooler and tween audiences to daytime hours; a new nighttime block aimed at teenagers, branded as "The N," occupied the remaining 12 hours of its daily schedule (from 6:00 p.m. to 6:00 a.m. ET), incorporating many of the tween-targeted shows that were previously carried on Noggin's daytime lineup (such as A Walk in Your Shoes, Sponk! and Big Kids) and eventually adding original and acquired/sublicensed fare catering to older teens featuring material more mature than would be permissible on Nickelodeon's other youth-targeted networks (such as Degrassi: The Next Generation, which would become the flagship show of The N and its successor networks for most of the Canadian drama's 14-season run; Instant Star; and South of Nowhere). (The N would be spun off into a separate 24-hour network in December 2007, taking over the channel space previously occupied by Nickelodeon Games and Sports, that would itself relaunch as TeenNick in September 2009.)

In July 2011, TeenNick launched "NickRewind" (originally branded under various names, starting as "The '90s Are All That"), a nostalgia block centered on reruns of Nickelodeon programs from the 1990s (such as Rugrats, Clarissa Explains It All and original block namesake All That), aimed at young adults who watched them as children during that decade; the block was formally discontinued in January 2022, one month after TeenNick started filling the slot with other programs from its regular schedule (relegating the pre-2000s "retro" Nickelodeon series to Paramount+ and selected Nick-branded streaming channels carried on co-owned Pluto TV). In October 2012, Nick Jr. launched the female-oriented comedy block "NickMom"; the block (which aired nightly from 10:00 p.m. to 2:00 a.m. ET) generated controversy as, because the network lacked a secondary Pacific TIme feed at the time, programs containing profanity and mature humor inappropriate for Nick Jr.'s main target audience of children ages 2 to 7 started at earlier times—as early as the late-afternoon in Hawaii—for viewers in regions from the Mountain Time Zone westward. Nick Jr. would rectify this issue in February 2013, when it added a Pacific Time feed for Western and certain non-contiguous regions that previously received the East Coast feed by default, ensuring that NickMom shows started at their appropriate times nationwide; the block was discontinued in September 2015, being replaced by reruns of recent and some older Nick Jr. series.

From its launch in April 1983 until September 2002, Disney Channel programmed its late-night schedule to cater to adult audiences. As a premium service, the channel's nighttime schedule (branded as "Disney Nighttime" from 1988 to 1995) featured a mix of recent and classic films of varying appeal to family audiences; historical, music and educational documentaries; and music specials aimed at adults. In September 1997, the "Vault Disney" block premiered as a Sunday-only nighttime collection of older Disney-produced series and specials (generally those made for network television) and selected older feature films from the studio that had been shifted off its daytime and prime time lineups (which had begun focusing exclusively on children and pre-teens since it formally converted into a commercial-free basic cable service in April 1997); it would expand into a nightly block by late 1998. "Vault Disney" was discontinued in September 2002 as part of a broader rebranding of the network to cater more to children and teenagers; since then, Disney Channel's late-night programming has consisted mainly of reruns of its preteen-skewing original and acquired series and, until the mid-2010s, occasional airings of the network's original made-for-TV films. (As such, Disney Channel is the largest American family-oriented cable network that does not target its nighttime programming at an older audience.)

In February 2004, sister network Toon Disney debuted "Jetix", a block of action-oriented live-action and animated series targeted at older children in the evening and early overnight slot (and was most well known for being the cable home for the Power Rangers franchise, which had its distribution rights transferred to Disney through its 2001 purchase of Saban Entertainment parent Fox Family Worldwide); Jetix ended as a programming block in the United States in February 2009, when Toon Disney was replaced by Disney XD, which initially featured programming similar to that featured on and carried over from the Jetix block. Beginning with its January 2012 launch, the Disney Junior linear channel featured some archival programming from the 1990s during the overnight hours; however into the 2020s, its late night lineup has shifted increasingly towards reruns of the channel's more recent original preschooler-targeted programs. In January 2012, FX Movie Channel (FXM) relegated the pre-1990s 20th Century Fox films that had made up most of the schedule since its October 1994 launch to a commercial-free overnight and daytime block, "FXM Retro" (from 3:00 a.m. to 3:00 p.m. ET), while devoting the remaining 12 hours of FXM's schedule to more recent movies from various studios that were originally acquired for broadcast on parent network FX.

Several basic and premium cable networks have carried thematic film showcases in late night, including several from the "midnight movie" genre (with a focus on cult, horror, exploitation and low-budget B movies) that aired on Friday and Saturday nights. Notable late-night cable showcases have included USA Up All Night (USA Network, 1989–98), which became synonymous for its longtime hosts Gilbert Gottfried and Rhonda Shear; Joe Bob's Drive-In Theater (The Movie Channel, 1984–96), which was hosted for all but the first two years of its run by actor/film critic John Bloom as the titular Joe Bob Briggs (known for his unusual summaries of each film's violence and nudity, describing objects featured in fight scenes by suffixing "-fu" to nouns, and tales about romantic troubles and legal brush-ups he endured while rushing to see a drive-in film); MonsterVision (TNT, 1991–2000), a horror/schlock/sci-fi-focused, marathon block-turned-double feature showcase that Bloom (as Briggs) hosted for its final three years under a format largely derived from his Drive-In Theater run; and TCM Underground (Turner Classic Movies, 2006–23), a cult film showcase that included film genres found less often on "midnight movie" presentations (including blaxploitation, slasher and giallo films).

=== Adult programming ===
Premium cable services historically have aired softcore pornographic content during the late night hours, containing simulated sexual intercourse and nudity that would likely not be allowed to air during the daytime hours. Over-the-air subscription television services that operated in certain markets—mainly in cities that were not yet fully wired for cable television service—between the late 1970s and the mid-1980s were among the first pay services to offer pornographic content. (Incidentally because FCC regulations of the time required stations offering subscription television services to provide some free-to-air programming, these services in many cases operated only in the evening and overnight hours, though most began operation as early as late morning on Saturdays and Sundays.) Adult programming blocks offered by these services (such as ONTV's Adults ONly, SelecTV's Adult Theater, Spectrum's Night Scene and VEU's Nite VEU lineups) were generally sold as an optional programming tier on top of the standard service (consisting of mainstream films and specials) for an additional monthly fee; subscribers who did not order the tier (as with pay-per-view events such as boxing matches and high-profile concerts) had their set-top decoder boxes temporarily reencrypt the service's signal until adult programming concluded.

Showtime (its main channel now known as Paramount+ with Showtime) was one of the earliest mainstream cable-originated premium services to adopt the practice of incorporating softcore content as part of its late-night programming. Debuting in 1981, the network's nightly "After Hours" block featured a mix of softcore pornographic films, and action and adventure movies, depending on the night. The softcore programming featured on "After Hours" would disappear from the main channel's schedule by 2004; however, while scheduled far less often in the present day, softcore adult films have continued to air in early overnight slots on most of Showtime's companion multiplex channels (except for Showtime Family Zone and SHO×BET as well as its predecessor Showtime Beyond), sister service The Movie Channel (which had begun incorporating adult films into its late-night schedule in the early 1990s, starting with the introduction of exploitation and softcore genre movies into the film selections featured on Joe Bob's Drive-In Theater) and their respective linear and on-demand services, serving as the genre's sole remaining presence on mainstream premium cable as of 2024.

Cinemax, which is mainly dedicated to mainstream theatrical films, was heavily associated with softcore adult programming, despite that content being contained entirely within a late-night block on the network. Originally debuting in May 1984 as part of the weekly block "Cinemax Friday After Dark", the network would expand its adult offerings to a nightly basis by 1996, and expanded the softcore fare in 1992 to include half-hour weekly series (such as Erotic Confessions and Hot Line). The "After Dark" block became the subject of both media scrutiny and pop culture humor (with references to the block's programming mentioned in various films and television shows during the 1990s and 2000s), and became so synonymous with the network that Cinemax was given the colloquial nickname "Skinemax" by both fans and detractors. Cinemax began scaling back its late-night softcore content in 2013 to focus more on its original action programs as the ubiquity of hardcore pornography on the Internet made such a block appear as a tamer novelty; adult programming on Cinemax and sister network HBO Zone (now HBO Movies) was dropped in 2018 following parent Time Warner (now Warner Bros. Discovery)'s acquisition by AT&T.

24-hour pay services dedicated to pornographic content also exist, also operating under a pay-per-view model, and are typically sold by television providers in either nighttime-only or all-day package options (these services are not available on virtual MVPD streaming services such as Hulu, DirecTV Stream and YouTube TV, which generally lack pay-per-view offerings). One of the first national adult-oriented cable services to debut was Escapade, launched by Rainbow Media in December 1980 as a male-targeted five-night-a-week pay service offering a mix of R-rated action, horror and exploitation B movies and softcore adult films that shared channel space with the company's highbrow arts and film service Bravo (now a general entertainment basic cable channel owned by NBCUniversal). In November 1982, Playboy Enterprises and Rainbow (which sold its interest in 1986) launched The Playboy Channel—which originally began in January of that year as a weekly programming block in Escapade's Friday night slot—as a standalone, nighttime-only pay service; in addition to adult films (which included an extra-fee offering featuring hardcore content), it featured a mix of interview specials with celebrities and Playboy centerfolds, adult-oriented soap operas, and stand-up comedy specials. In December 1989, The Playboy Channel switched to a pay-per-view model (renamed Playboy at Night), sharing channel space with the Action Channel (later Action Pay-Per-View and BET Action Pay-Per-View; now defunct), which offered action and horror films, and specials during the daytime hours. A secondary pay-per-view/premium service, Playboy TV, launched in 1994 on satellite provider DirecTV, eventually superseding Playboy at Night as the company's pay offering.

Other pornographic film-oriented services launched during the early 1980s, including the Fun Unrestricted Network (FUN), The Pleasure Channel, HiLife, Rendezvous and the more hardcore Private Screenings and Eros. These services faced opposition from parents and religious conservatives amid concerns about children viewing their programming. One such service that would become the center of this criticism, American Exxxtasy, began as an unscrambled softcore service (then named American Extasy) available to C-band satellite customers; it would shift focus in 1985 to offer uncut hardcore films (altering its name to reflect the explicit nature of its film content); the relaunched service required an annual subscription of $399 (equivalent to $1,194 in 2025, including the cost of the descrambler box needed to unencrypt the signal), although customers were able to view one free film per night as encouragement to sign up. Citing a 1988 federal law barring the transmission of "obscene material" on television, a 1989 Alabama obscenity investigation into children obtaining recorded copies of the network's hardcore movies led to parent company Home Dish Only Satellite Networks (HDOSN), satellite transmission firms GTE Spacenet (and corporate parent GTE) and U.S. Satellite Corporation, and 10 people being indicted by a grand jury on 500 charges of distributing hardcore pornography via satellite into the state. HDOSN and its networks would shut down in March 1990, after several C-band providers dropped American Exxxtasy and its softcore sister service Tuxxedo to avoid further criminal liability, and company founders Paul Klein and Jeffrey Younger reached a settlement with the U.S. Department of Justice agreeing to plead guilty to obscenity charges and pay a $150,000 fine, cease satellite transmissions and turn over their film library to the government. Civil liberty organizations condemned the settlement, fearing it would set a "horrendous precedent" for First Amendment expression rights and chill pay television industry innovation.

Additional services debuted during the 1990s; Spice launched in 1992, offering hardcore pornographic films reedited to incorporate "softcore" versions of sex scenes omitting more graphic material (including clear depictions of male genitalia, penetration and ejaculation). (Hardcore content was added to the Spice Networks in January 2013, when Manwin (now Aylo)—which bought the networks from Playboy Enterprises in 2011—rebranded its four U.S. channels, three of which were renamed after co-owned production studios Brazzers, Reality Kings and Mofos.) In February 1993, pay-per-view network Viewer's Choice (now In Demand) relaunched its secondary service Viewer's Choice II as Hot Choice, featuring action-adventure movies during the daytime and evening and erotica in the late evening and overnight hours (it would switch to a softcore adult service full-time in September 2001). Erotica product-focused home shopping services Adam & Eve Channel and Cupid Network Television launched in 1994.

Networks featuring more hardcore content debuted in the late 1990s and 2000s, particularly as a result of the United States v. Playboy Entertainment ruling effectively determining obscenity regulations did not apply to pay television, including Spice Hot (featuring more explicit material than allowed on the main Spice channel), The Erotic Network and Penthouse TV; however, other softcore services such as The Hot Network also entered the market during this timeframe. The increased competition eroded Playboy's dominance of the adult cable market, which it attempted to remedy by acquiring Spice parent Spice Entertainment Companies in February 1998 and later The Hot Network (which, as Spice Hot, it had previously sold to Califa Entertainment Group during the Spice Entertainment purchase) in July 2001, and adding somewhat more explicit films (similar in vein to Spice's reedited hardcore offerings) to Playboy TV's schedule.

== Regulation ==
=== "Safe harbor" watershed ===
The late night and overnight graveyard slots fall within the FCC's defined "safe harbor" period, exceptions to regulations normally prohibiting "indecent" material on broadcast television and radio that permit programming suitable only for mature or adult audiences to be broadcast between 10:00 p.m. and 6:00 a.m. local time. While broadcast stations (which are licensed to broadcasters over publicly owned airwaves and are therefore subject to the "scarcity rationale", a legal concept that affords television and radio broadcasters lesser First Amendment protections than other media, thus permitting stricter regulation of what material they can air) can legally air almost anything they want late at night and cable networks can at all hours, broadcast stations rarely offer and basic cable services tend to limit their carriage of indecent content to avoid reprimands from advertisers, and in the case of over-the-air broadcasters, the constant fluctuation of indecency standards to account for changes in public acceptance and FCC enforcement.

The FCC attempted to eliminate the safe harbor provision in 1988, as directed by the United States Congress, however the proposed 24-hour ban on indecent material was stricken as unconstitutional by the D.C. Circuit Court of Appeals in May 1991; the Telecommunications Act of 1992 re-established a safe harbor period from midnight to 6:00 a.m., before restoring the previous 10:00 p.m. watershed start following further D.C. Circuit rulings.

=== Regulations on adult cable programming ===
Restricted-access cable-originated channels are not covered by the "safe harbor" regulations. Premium channels and pay-per-view services distributed through multichannel video programming distributors (MVPD) are given considerably more leeway to broadcast material strong to graphic profanity, violence, nudity and sexual content as their revenue is generated through fees paid by subscribers (who receive their programming for an additional fee, usually in addition to a basic programming tier). The FCC does require pay television providers to completely scramble or block the video and audio portions of channels dedicated to sexually explicit material, or require them to transmit their programming only during the designated watershed hours when children are not likely to view it.

Concerns over children hearing or seeing images of sexual content from adult networks resulting from signal bleed resulted in Congress including a provision into the Telecommunications Act of 1996 requiring cable providers carrying channels "primarily dedicated to sexually-oriented programs" to either fully scramble or block those channels, or to restrict their transmission to between 10:00 p.m. and 6:00 a.m. Section 505 of the Act, which was enacted based on a handful of complaints without a prior congressional hearing, was struck down in a 5-4 ruling by the U.S. Supreme Court in United States v. Playboy Entertainment Group (2000), holding that it constituted a broad content-based restriction in violation of the First Amendment as the provision singled out specific types of programming and programmers, and that a separate provision (Section 504) allowing subscribers to request the scrambling or complete blocking of an adult channel was sufficient.

== See also ==
- List of late-night American network TV programs
