= 1994–95 United States network television schedule (late night) =

These are the late night schedules for the four United States broadcast networks that offer programming during this time period, from September 1994 to August 1995. All times are Eastern or Pacific. Affiliates will fill non-network schedule with local, syndicated, or paid programming. Affiliates also have the option to preempt or delay network programming at their discretion.

As of January 1995, industry observers were predicting that The Tonight Show with Jay Leno on NBC might overtake the Late Show with David Letterman on CBS by the end of the year, noting that Leno had started to make gains in the ratings.

== Legend ==
- Light blue indicates Local programming.
- Gray indicates encore programming.
- Yellow indicates late night talk or variety shows.
- Gold indicates network news programming.

== Schedule ==
Network		11:00 pm	11:35 pm	12:00 am	12:30 am	1:00 am	1:30/1:35 am	2:00 am	2:30 am	3:00 am	3:30 am	4:00 am	4:30 am	5:00 am	5:30 am
ABC		Local Programming	Nightline	ABC in Concert (Fri)	Local Programming			ABC World News Now			Local Programming				ABC World News This Morning
CBS	Fall	Local Programming	Late Show with David Letterman		Crimetime After Primetime (Mon-Thu); Kids in the Hall (Fri, 12:37-1:05)		Local Programming	Up To The Minute		Local Programming					CBS Morning News
CBS	Winter	Local Programming	Late Show with David Letterman		The Late Late Show With Tom Snyder		Local Programming	Up To The Minute		Local Programming					CBS Morning News
NBC		Local Programming	The Tonight Show with Jay Leno		Late Night with Conan O'Brien		Later with Greg Kinnear (Mon-Thu); Friday Night (Fri, 1:35-2:35)	NBC Nightside			Local Programming				NBC News at Sunrise

=== Saturday ===
Network	11:00 pm	11:30 pm	12:00 am	12:30 am	1:00 am	1:30 am	2:00 am	2:30 am	3:00 am	3:30 am	4:00 am	4:30 am	5:00 am	5:30 am
NBC	Local Programming	Saturday Night Live			Local Programming									
FOX	Tales from the Crypt (R)	Local Programming												

== By network ==
=== ABC ===
Returning series

- ABC in Concert
- ABC World News Now
- ABC World News This Morning
- Nightline

Not returning from 1993-94:

- ABC in Concert Country

=== CBS ===
Returning series

- CBS Morning News
- Crimetime After Primetime
- Kids in the Hall
- Late Show with David Letterman
- Up to the Minute

New series

- The Late Late Show with Tom Snyder

=== Fox ===
Returning series

- Tales from the Crypt (reruns)

Not returning from 1993-94:

- Comic Strip Live
- The Chevy Chase Show
- Code 3 (reruns)
- In Living Color (reruns)

=== NBC ===
Returning series

- Friday Night
- Late Night with Conan O'Brien
- Later with Greg Kinnear
- NBC News at Sunrise
- NBC Nightside
- Saturday Night Live
- The Tonight Show with Jay Leno
