= 1992–93 United States network television schedule (late night) =

These are the late night schedules for the four United States broadcast networks that offer programming during this time period, from September 1992 to August 1993. All times are Eastern or Pacific. Affiliates will fill non-network schedule with local, syndicated, or paid programming. Affiliates also have the option to preempt or delay network programming at their discretion.

In January 1993, late-night talk show host David Letterman announced that he would be leaving NBC, his home for 11 years, to launch a new show on CBS.

== Legend ==
- Light blue indicates Local programming.
- Gray indicates encore programming.
- Pink indicates game shows.
- Yellow indicates late night talk or variety shows.
- Gold indicates network news programming.

== Schedule ==
=== Monday-Friday ===
Network		11:00 pm	11:30 pm	12:00 am	12:30 am	1:00 am	1:30 am	2:00 am	2:30 am	3:00 am	3:30 am	4:00 am	4:30 am	5:00 am	5:30 am
ABC		Local Programming	Nightline (11:35)	ABC in Concert (Fri)		Local Programming		ABC World News Now			Local Programming				
CBS	Fall	Local Programming	Crimetime After Primetime		CBS Late Night (Mon.-Thu.); Kids in the Hall (Fri, 12:37-1:05)	Personals	A Closer Score	Up To The Minute		Local Programming					
CBS	Winter	Local Programming	Crimetime After Primetime		CBS Late Night (Mon.-Thu.); Kids in the Hall (Fri, 12:37-1:05)	Local Programming		Up To The Minute		Local Programming					
NBC		Local Programming	The Tonight Show with Jay Leno (11:35)		Late Night with David Letterman		Later with Bob Costas (Mon-Thu); Friday Night Videos (Fri, 1:35-2:35)	NBC Nightside			Local Programming				

=== Saturday ===
Network	11:00 pm	11:30 pm	12:00 am	12:30 am	1:00 am	1:30 am	2:00 am	2:30 am	3:00 am	3:30 am	4:00 am	4:30 am	5:00 am	5:30 am
NBC	Local Programming	Saturday Night Live			Local Programming									
FOX	Comic Strip Live		Local Programming											

== By network ==
=== ABC ===
Returning series:

- ABC in Concert
- ABC World News Now
- Nightline

Not returning from 1991-92:

- Studio 59

=== CBS ===
Returning series:

- A Closer Score
- CBS Late Night
- Crimetime After Primetime
- Kids in the Hall (moved from HBO)
- Personals
- Up To The Minute

Not returning from 1991-92:

- CBS News Nightwatch
- Night Games

=== NBC ===
Returning series:

- Friday Night Videos
- Late Night with David Letterman
- Later
- NBC Nightside
- Saturday Night Live
- The Tonight Show with Jay Leno

Not returning from 1991-92:

- The Tonight Show Starring Johnny Carson

=== Fox ===
Returning series:

- Comic Strip Live
