= 1991–92 United States network television schedule (late night) =

These are the late night schedules for the four United States broadcast networks that offer programming during this time period, from September 1991 to August 1992. All times are Eastern or Pacific. Affiliates will fill non-network schedule with local, syndicated, or paid programming. Affiliates also have the option to preempt or delay network programming at their discretion.

On May 22, 1992, The Tonight Show host Johnny Carson hosted his final show on NBC, ending his 30-year reign as the "king of late-night television". On May 25, 1992, Jay Leno took over as his replacement.

== Legend ==
- Light blue indicates Local programming.
- Gray indicates encore programming.
- Pink indicates game shows.
- Yellow indicates late night talk or variety shows.
- Gold indicates network news programming.

== Schedule ==
=== Monday-Friday ===
Network		11:00 pm	11:30 pm	12:00 am	12:30 am	1:00 am	1:30 am	2:00 am	2:30 am	3:00 am	3:30 am	4:00 am	4:30 am	5:00 am	5:30 am
ABC	Fall	Local Programming	Nightline (11:35)	Studio 59		In Concert '91 (Fri)		Local Programming							
ABC	Winter	Local Programming	Nightline (11:35)	ABC In Concert (Fri)		Local Programming		ABC World News Now							
CBS	Fall	Local Programming	Crimetime After Primetime		Personals	Local Programming		CBS News Nightwatch							
CBS	October	Local Programming	Crimetime After Primetime		Personals	Night Games	Local Programming	CBS News Nightwatch							
CBS	Spring	Local Programming	Crimetime After Primetime		Personals	Night Games	Local Programming	Up To The Minute							
CBS	Summer	Local Programming	Crimetime After Primetime		Personals	A Closer Score	Local Programming	Up To The Minute							
NBC	Fall	Local Programming	The Tonight Show Starring Johnny Carson (11:35)		Late Night with David Letterman		Later With Bob Costas (Mon-Thu, 1:35); Friday Night Videos (Fri, 1:35-2:35)	Local Programming							
NBC	November	Local Programming	The Tonight Show Starring Johnny Carson (11:35)		Late Night with David Letterman		Later With Bob Costas (Mon-Thu, 1:35); Friday Night Videos (Fri, 1:35-2:35)	Local Programming		NBC Nightside			Local Programming		
NBC	Summer	Local Programming	The Tonight Show with Jay Leno (11:35)		Late Night with David Letterman		Later With Bob Costas (Mon-Thu, 1:35); Friday Night Videos (Fri, 1:35-2:35)	Local Programming		NBC Nightside			Local Programming		

Note: The final episode of The Tonight Show Starring Johnny Carson aired on May 22, 1992. The first episode of The Tonight Show with Jay Leno aired on May 25, 1992
Note: CBS News Nightwatch was renamed Up To The Minute
Note: Into The Night was renamed Studio 59

=== Saturday ===
Network	11:00 pm	11:30 pm	12:00 am	12:30 am	1:00 am	1:30 am	2:00 am	2:30 am	3:00 am	3:30 am	4:00 am	4:30 am	5:00 am	5:30 am
NBC	Local Programming	Saturday Night Live			Local Programming									
FOX	Comic Strip Live		Local Programming											

== By network ==
=== ABC ===
Returning series:

- In Concert '91 (renamed ABC In Concert)
- Nightline
- Studio 59

New series:

- ABC World News Now

=== CBS ===
Returning series:

- CBS News Nightwatch

New series:

- A Closer Score
- Crimetime After Primetime
- Night Games
- Personals
- Up To The Minute

Not returning from 1990-91:

- America Tonight
- CBS Late Night

=== NBC ===
Returning series:

- Friday Night Videos
- Late Night with David Letterman
- Later With Bob Costas
- Saturday Night Live
- The Tonight Show Starring Johnny Carson

New series:

- NBC Nightside
- The Tonight Show with Jay Leno

Not returning from 1990-91:

- The George Michael Sports Machine (continues to air in First-run syndication)

=== Fox ===
Returning series:

- Comic Strip Live
