= 1990–91 United States network television schedule (late night) =

These are the late night schedules for the four United States broadcast networks that offer programming during this time period, from September 1990 to August 1991. All times are Eastern or Pacific. Affiliates will fill non-network schedule with local, syndicated, or paid programming. Affiliates also have the option to preempt or delay network programming at their discretion.

On May 23, 1991, Johnny Carson announced that he would be stepping down as host of The Tonight Show on NBC the following year, after dominating American late-night television for 30 years.

== Legend ==
- Light blue indicates Local programming.
- Gray indicates encore programming.
- Yellow indicates late night talk or variety shows.
- Gold indicates network news programming.

== Schedule ==
=== Monday-Friday ===
Network		11:00 pm	11:30 pm	12:00 am	12:30 am	1:00 am	1:30 am	2:00 am	2:30 am	3:00 am	3:30 am	4:00 am	4:30 am	5:00 am	5:30 am
ABC	Fall	Local Programming	Nightline	Into the Night Starring Rick Dees		Local Programming									
ABC	Summer	Local Programming	Nightline	Into the Night		In Concert '91 (Fri)		Local Programming							
CBS	Fall	Local Programming	America Tonight	CBS Late Night			Local Programming	CBS News Nightwatch							
CBS	Spring	Local Programming	CBS Late Night				CBS News Nightwatch								
NBC		Local Programming	The Tonight Show Starring Johnny Carson		Late Night with David Letterman		Later With Bob Costas (Mon-Thu, 1:35); Friday Night Videos (Fri, 1:30-2:30)	Local Programming							

=== Saturday ===
Network	11:00 pm	11:30 pm	12:00 am	12:30 am	1:00 am	1:30 am	2:00 am	2:30 am	3:00 am	3:30 am	4:00 am	4:30 am	5:00 am	5:30 am
NBC	Local Programming	Saturday Night Live			Local Programming									
FOX	Comic Strip: Late Night		Local Programming											

=== Sunday ===
Network	11:00 pm	11:30 pm	12:00 am	12:30 am	1:00 am	1:30 am	2:00 am	2:30 am	3:00 am	3:30 am	4:00 am	4:30 am	5:00 am	5:30 am
NBC	Local Programming	The George Michael Sports Machine	Local Programming											

== By network ==
=== ABC ===
Returning series

- Into the Night Starring Rick Dees
- Nightline

New series

- In Concert '91

=== CBS ===
Returning series

- CBS Late Night
- CBS News Nightwatch

New series

- America Tonight

Not returning from 1989-90:

- The Pat Sajak Show

=== NBC ===
Returning series

- Friday Night Videos
- The George Michael Sports Machine
- Late Night with David Letterman
- Later With Bob Costas
- Saturday Night Live
- The Tonight Show Starring Johnny Carson

=== Fox ===
Returning series

- Comic Strip Late Night
