= 1993–94 United States network television schedule (late night) =

These are the late night schedules for the four United States broadcast networks that offer programming during this time period, from September 1993 to August 1994. All times are Eastern or Pacific. Affiliates will fill non-network schedule with local, syndicated, or paid programming. Affiliates also have the option to preempt or delay network programming at their discretion.

In September 1993, Conan O'Brien made his debut as the late-night talk show host replacing David Letterman on NBC, in the time slot immediately following The Tonight Show with Jay Leno. On February 28, 1994, Greg Kinnear took over as host of the NBC weeknight show Later, which had previously been hosted by Bob Costas.

== Legend ==
- Light blue indicates Local programming.
- Gray indicates encore programming.
- Yellow indicates late night talk or variety shows.
- Gold indicates network news programming.

== Schedule ==
=== Monday-Friday ===
Network		11:00 pm	11:30 pm	12:00 am	12:30 am	1:00 am	1:30 am/1:35 am	2:00 am	2:30 am	3:00 am	3:30 am	4:00 am	4:30 am	5:00 am	5:30 am
ABC		Local Programming	Nightline (11:35)	ABC in Concert (Fri)	Local Programming			ABC World News Now			Local Programming				ABC World News This Morning
CBS		Local Programming	Late Show with David Letterman (11:35)		Crimetime After Primetime (Mon-Thu); Kids in the Hall (Fri, 12:37-1:05)		Local Programming	Up To The Minute		Local Programming					CBS Morning News
NBC	Fall	Local Programming	The Tonight Show with Jay Leno (11:35)		Late Night with Conan O'Brien		Later with Bob Costas (Mon-Thu); Friday Night Videos (Fri, 1:35-2:35)	NBC Nightside			Local Programming				NBC News at Sunrise
NBC	Winter	Local Programming	The Tonight Show with Jay Leno (11:35)		Late Night with Conan O'Brien		Later with Greg Kinnear (Mon-Thu); Friday Night (Fri, 1:35-2:35)	NBC Nightside			Local Programming				NBC News at Sunrise
FOX	Fall	The Chevy Chase Show		Local Programming											
FOX	November	In Living Color (R)	In Living Color (R)	Local Programming											
FOX	Spring	Code 3 (R)	In Living Color (R)	Local Programming											
FOX	Summer	Local Programming													

=== Saturday ===
Network		11:00 pm	11:30 pm	12:00 am	12:30 am	1:00 am	1:30 am	2:00 am	2:30 am	3:00 am	3:30 am	4:00 am	4:30 am	5:00 am	5:30 am
ABC	June	Local Programming	ABC in Concert Country		Local Programming										
NBC		Local Programming	Saturday Night Live			Local Programming									
FOX	Fall	Comic Strip Live		Local Programming											
FOX	Winter	Local Programming													
FOX	Summer	Tales from the Crypt (R)	Tales from the Crypt (R)	Local Programming											

== By network ==
=== ABC ===
Returning series

- ABC in Concert
- ABC World News Now
- ABC World News This Morning
- Nightline

New series

- ABC in Concert Country

=== CBS ===
Returning series

- CBS Morning News
- Crimetime After Primetime
- Kids in the Hall
- Up to the Minute

New series

- Late Show with David Letterman

Not returning from 1992-93:

- A Closer Score
- CBS Late Night
- Personals

=== FOX ===
Returning series

- Comic Strip Live
- Code 3 (reruns)
- In Living Color (reruns)
- Tales from the Crypt (reruns) (moved from HBO)

New series

- The Chevy Chase Show

=== NBC ===
Returning series

- Friday Night Videos / Friday Night
- Later
- NBC News at Sunrise
- NBC Nightside
- Saturday Night Live
- The Tonight Show with Jay Leno

New series

- Late Night with Conan O'Brien

Not returning from 1992-93:

- Late Night with David Letterman
