= 1988–89 United States network television schedule (late night) =

These are the late night schedules for the four United States broadcast networks that offered programming during this time period, from September 1988 to August 1989.

During this season, CBS launched The Pat Sajak Show to compete with NBC's The Tonight Show Starring Johnny Carson. Meanwhile, NBC launched Later with Bob Costas, a new half-hour show following Late Night with David Letterman.

== Legend ==
- Light blue indicates Local programming.
- Gray indicates encore programming.
- Yellow indicates late night talk or variety shows.
- Gold indicates network news programming.

== Schedule ==
All times are Eastern or Pacific. Affiliates will fill non-network schedule with local, syndicated, or paid programming. Affiliates also have the option to preempt or delay network programming at their discretion.

=== Weekday ===
Network		11:00 pm	11:30 pm	12:00 am	12:30 am	1:00 am	1:30/1:35 am	2:00 am	2:30 am	3:00 am	3:30 am	4:00 am	4:30 am	5:00 am	5:30 am
ABC		Local Programming	Nightline	Local Programming											
CBS	Fall	Local Programming	CBS Late Night				Local Programming	CBS News Nightwatch							
CBS	Winter	Local Programming	The Pat Sajak Show			Local Programming		CBS News Nightwatch							
NBC		Local Programming	The Tonight Show Starring Johnny Carson		Late Night with David Letterman		Later With Bob Costas (Mon-Thu, 1:35); Friday Night Videos (Fri, 1:30-2:30)	Local Programming							

=== Saturday ===
Network		11:00 pm	11:30 pm	12:00 am	12:30 am	1:00 am	1:30 am	2:00 am	2:30 am	3:00 am	3:30 am	4:00 am	4:30 am	5:00 am	5:30 am
NBC		Local Programming	Saturday Night Live			Local Programming									
FOX	August	Comic Strip Live		Local Programming											

=== Sunday ===
Network	11:00 pm	11:30 pm	12:00 am	12:30 am	1:00 am	1:30 am	2:00 am	2:30 am	3:00 am	3:30 am	4:00 am	4:30 am	5:00 am	5:30 am
NBC	Local Programming	The George Michael Sports Machine	Local Programming											

== By network ==
=== ABC ===
Returning Series

- Nightline

=== CBS ===
Returning Series

- CBS Late Night
- CBS News Nightwatch

New Series

- The Pat Sajak Show

Not Returning From 1987-88

- Top of the Pops

=== Fox ===
New Series

- Comic Strip Live

Not Returning From 1987-88

- The Late Show
- The Wilton North Report

=== NBC ===
Returning Series

- Friday Night Videos
- The George Michael Sports Machine
- Late Night with David Letterman
- Saturday Night Live
- The Tonight Show Starring Johnny Carson

New Series

- Later With Bob Costas
