= 1989–90 United States network television schedule (late night) =

These are the late night schedules for the four United States broadcast networks that offer programming during this time period, from September 1989 to August 1990. All times are Eastern or Pacific. Affiliates will fill non-network schedule with local, syndicated, or paid programming. Affiliates also have the option to preempt or delay network programming at their discretion.

== Legend ==
- Light blue indicates Local programming.
- Gray indicates encore programming.
- Yellow indicates late night talk or variety shows.
- Gold indicates network news programming.

== Schedule ==
=== Monday-Friday ===
Network		11:00 pm	11:30 pm	12:00 am	12:30 am	1:00 am	1:30/1:35 am	2:00 am	2:30 am	3:00 am	3:30 am	4:00 am	4:30 am	5:00 am	5:30 am
ABC	Fall	Local Programming	Nightline	Local Programming											
ABC	Summer	Local Programming	Nightline	Into the Night Starring Rick Dees		Local Programming									
CBS	Fall	Local Programming	The Pat Sajak Show		Local Programming			CBS News Nightwatch							
CBS	Spring	Local Programming	Wiseguy		CBS Late Night		Local Programming	CBS News Nightwatch							
NBC		Local Programming	The Tonight Show Starring Johnny Carson		Late Night with David Letterman		Later With Bob Costas (Mon-Thu, 1:35); Friday Night Videos (Fri, 1:30-2:30)	Local Programming							

The Pat Sajak Show was reduced to 60 minutes on October 30, 1989.

=== Saturday ===
Network	11:00 pm	11:30 pm	12:00 am	12:30 am	1:00 am	1:30 am	2:00 am	2:30 am	3:00 am	3:30 am	4:00 am	4:30 am	5:00 am	5:30 am
NBC	Local Programming	Saturday Night Live			Local Programming									
FOX	Comic Strip Live		Local Programming											

=== Sunday ===
Network	11:00 pm	11:30 pm	12:00 am	12:30 am	1:00 am	1:30 am	2:00 am	2:30 am	3:00 am	3:30 am	4:00 am	4:30 am	5:00 am	5:30 am
NBC	Local Programming	The George Michael Sports Machine	Local Programming											

== By network ==
=== ABC ===
Returning series

- Nightline

New series

- Into the Night Starring Rick Dees

=== CBS ===
Returning series

- CBS Late Night
- CBS News Nightwatch
- The Pat Sajak Show

=== NBC ===
Returning series

- Friday Night Videos
- The George Michael Sports Machine
- Late Night with David Letterman
- Later With Bob Costas
- Saturday Night Live
- The Tonight Show Starring Johnny Carson

=== Fox ===
Returning series

- Comic Strip Live
