= Dash's Designer =

Men's clothing store chain

- Company type: Privately held company
- Industry: Retail
- Founded: 1970
- Defunct: 1989
- Fate: Liquidation
- Headquarters: Washington, D.C., Tysons Corner, Virginia, United States
- Key people: John Dashtara, founder and Dar Dash, co-founder
- Products: Men's fashion apparel
- Number of employees: 350 (1988)

Dash's Designer, commonly known as Dash's, was an American off-price, high-end men's clothing store chain based in Washington, D.C., Georgetown, Maryland, and Tysons Corner, Virginia.

== History ==
After achieving success with several boutique stores in the late 1960s and early 70s in Georgetown and downtown Washington, D.C., John Dashtara and his brother Dar Dash established Dash's Designer in 1978.

Dash's was as well known for its ad campaigns as it was for selling men's garments at the lowest prices. Dash's won several ADDY Awards for their television campaigns, including The Camel, which was featured on Dick Clark's TV's Bloopers & Practical Jokes. President Gerald Ford delivered television and radio spots for the company during its collaboration with Washington's Children's Hospital and its Muscular Dystrophy Clinic. Dash's was also the first television sponsor of a number of television and radio programs, including the syndicated The George Michael Sports Machine.

The flagship store on 1308 F Street NW, was replaced by the Tysons Corner location as the flagship store and headquarters in 1978, and would remain so until its liquidation sale in January 1989.

In late 1983, Dash's brought suit against the nation's largest manufacturer of men's clothing, Hartmarx Corp., of trying to hurt its business by refusing to sell the retailer some of its best products and by charging one of its chief competitors lower prices. The suit was voluntarily dropped in 1984. The law firm was later sanctioned.

Dash's filed for bankruptcy protection in late 1988, and the company ceased operations in 1989.
