= Scene of the Crime (TV series) =

- Genre: Mystery anthology
- Created by: Stephen J. Cannell
- Starring: Stephen J. Cannell (host) various
- Country of origin: United States
- Original language: English
- No. of seasons: 2
- No. of episodes: 22

Production
- Production locations: Vancouver, British Columbia, Canada

Original release
- Network: CBS
- Release: April 3, 1991 – March 4, 1992

Scene of the Crime is a mystery anthology series that aired in 1991 and 1992 on CBS, as part of the Crimetime After Primetime late-night block. Rather than employing different actors each episode, the program had a regular cast who played different characters in each story. The series was produced in Vancouver, British Columbia, Canada, and series regulars included Canadian character actors Stephen McHattie and Kim Coates, and producer Stephen J. Cannell appeared onscreen to introduce each story as the show's host.

== Series overview ==
| Season | Episodes | Originally aired (U.S. dates) | |
| Season | Episodes | First aired | Last aired |
|---|---|---|---|
| 1 | 10 | April 3, 1991 | June 5, 1991 |
| 2 | 12 | September 11, 1991 | March 4, 1992 |

== Repertory company ==
- Teri Austin
- Kim Coates (season 1)
- Lisa Houle
- Stephen McHattie
- Maxine Miller
- Francois Montagut
- Sandra Nelson
- Robert Paisley
- Barbara Parkins (season 1)
- Olivier Pierre
- George Touliatos
