= NBC Nightside =

American overnight newscast

- Presented by: Campbell Brown; Tom Donovan; Bruce Hall; Sara James; Kim Hindrew; Antonio Mora; Tom Miller; Tonya Strong
- Country of origin: United States
- Original language: English
- No. of seasons: 7

Production
- Production locations: NBC News Channel, Charlotte, North Carolina
- Camera setup: Multi-camera
- Running time: 1 hour 30 minutes (live, followed by rebroadcast)
- Production company: NBC News Productions

Original release
- Network: NBC
- Release: November 4, 1991 – September 20, 1998

Related
- NBC News Overnight (1982–1983)

NBC Nightside (also known as NBC News Nightside) is an American overnight rolling newscast that aired on NBC from 1991 to 1998. The program was produced in three half-hour segments. It usually aired live seven nights a week, and was fed to NBC stations beginning at 2:00 a.m. ET Sunday through Friday (immediately following Later), 2:30 a.m. ET on Saturdays (after Friday Night Videos), and 1:00 a.m. ET on Sundays (after Saturday Night Live) and looped until the next morning, followed out by NBC News at Sunrise on weekdays.

== History ==
The program premiered on November 4, 1991, and was NBC's second attempt at a late-night news program after NBC News Overnight, which ran for seventeen months from 1982 to 1983.

Nightside differed from its two competitors – CBS' Up to the Minute and ABC's World News Now, which are both based in New York City – in that rather than being broadcast from the headquarters of NBC News itself in New York, it was instead based out of the Charlotte, North Carolina facilities of NBC News Channel, the network's newsfeed service providing customized reports and video of national news to NBC's owned-and-operated stations and network affiliates, and which was based in studios connected to those of Charlotte's NBC affiliate WCNC-TV. Nightside also aired on Saturdays and Sundays during the overnight slot, whereas ABC and CBS's shows did not.

Some of Nightside's many anchors went on to national success, including Antonio Mora and Campbell Brown. Former NBC News president Steve Capus once served as a senior producer for the program.

Despite the show's financial profitability and decent ratings, the network canceled it in 1998 and aired its last telecast on September 20 of that year. Two days later, NBC filled the overnight timeslot with NBC All Night, a block consisting of repeats of the network's late-night and daytime talk shows.

Currently, the timeslot is the home to syndicated and paid programming on NBC's affiliates outside network contributions; NBC currently provides its affiliates a replay of that evening's Top Story with Tom Llamas (itself a contribution from streaming network NBC News Now, an Internet spin-off of NBC News a la the NBC News Channel, which itself remains in operation), along with a late night replay of The Kelly Clarkson Show to NBC affiliates carrying that syndicated talk show, with weekends featuring LX programming after Saturday Night Live and a Meet the Press replay late Sunday night/Monday morning. Conversely, Early Today, which formerly started two hours before Today during the run of Nightside, is now fed to NBC stations starting at 3:30 a.m. Eastern, as local morning newscasts have encroached into the early morning hours (starting as early as 4 a.m. local time).

== Anchors ==
The program's anchors included:

- Campbell Brown
- Tom Donovan
- Bruce Hall
- Sara James
- Kim Hindrew
- Hilary Lane
- Antonio Mora
- Tom Miller
- Tonya Strong
