= Crimetime After Primetime =

Group of American television series

Crimetime After Primetime is the umbrella title for a group of late-night crime-investigation shows that debuted at various times on CBS in 1991 and 1992, running through late summer of 1993.

== History ==
Prior to 1989, CBS aired the similarly formatted CBS Late Night. The block was canceled to make way for The Pat Sajak Show, a conventional late-night talk show. After the shortening, and eventual failure, of The Pat Sajak Show, a revamped CBS Late Night block debuted, airing a variety of news, talk shows, reruns, and adult game shows.

In March 1991, after a two-month hiatus due to Gulf War coverage, CBS retooled the block by airing original series under the new umbrella title of Crimetime After Primetime.

Much like CBS Late Night did in the late 1980s, Crimetime After Primetime relied heavily on dramas that were imported from Canada, giving the programs (most of which were produced to meet Canadian content quotas) an additional revenue stream. CBS also invested in producing some original series for the block.

The block was dropped when CBS began broadcasting the Late Show with David Letterman in August 1993.

== Series lineup ==
The shows in the series followed this general lineup:

- late Monday nights/early Tuesday mornings: Sweating Bullets (known as Tropical Heat outside of the U.S.), and Urban Angel.
- late Tuesday nights/early Wednesday mornings: Forever Knight (later new episodes were syndicated through May 1996, after CBS cancelled it), and The Exile
- late Wednesday nights/early Thursday mornings: Scene of the Crime, replaced by Dangerous Curves
- late Thursday nights/early Friday mornings: Fly by Night, replaced by Silk Stalkings (continued with new episodes on USA Network through April 1999, after CBS cancelled it)
- late Friday nights/early Saturday mornings: Dark Justice (the series was later rerun by TNT)
- In 1993, the first two seasons of Wiseguy were shown nightly from Monday through Friday.

== See also ==
- List of late-night American network TV programs
- Crimetime Saturday
