= In Concert (American TV series) =

1972 American TV series

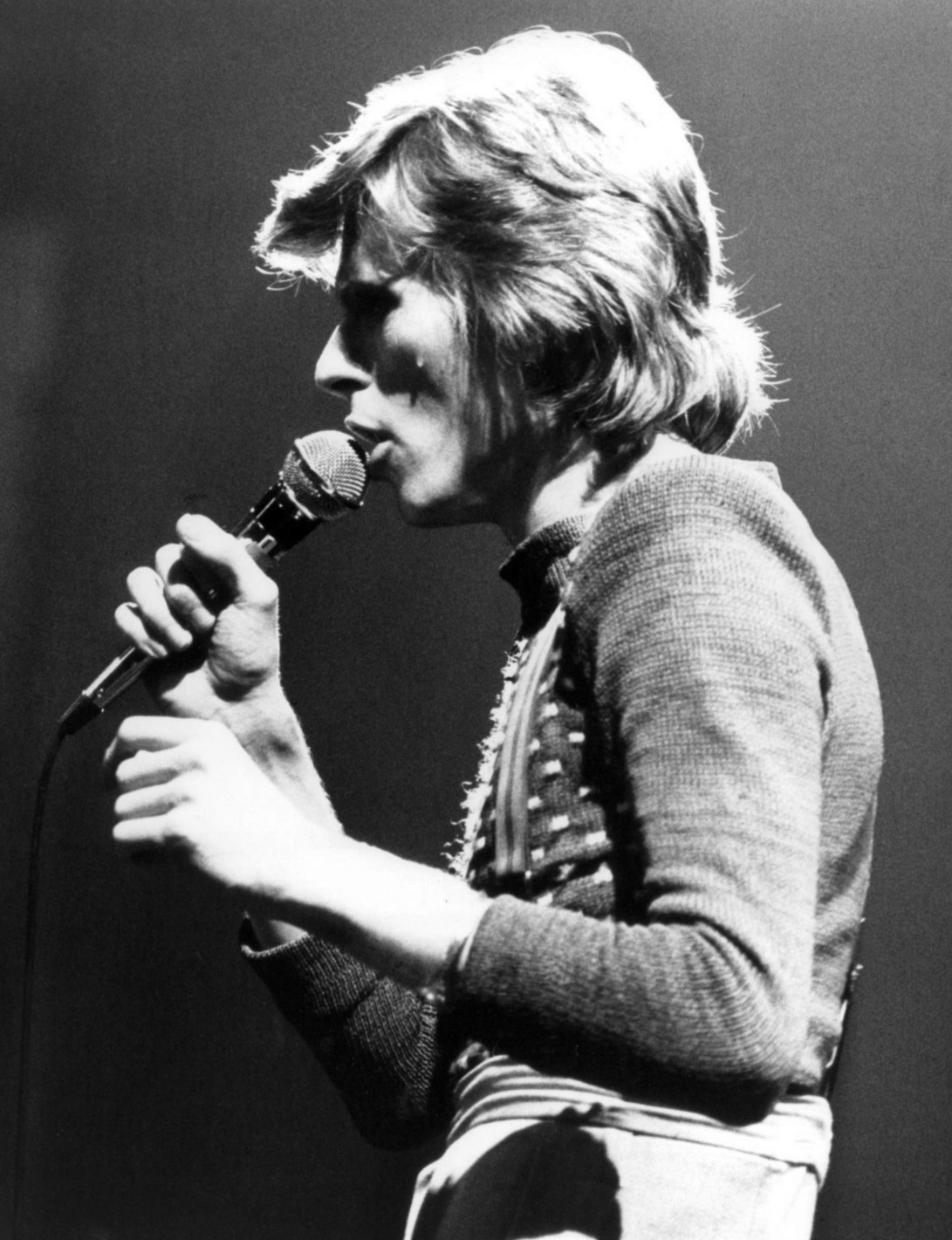
- David Bowie performing at the Hammersmith Odeon in 1973, aired on In Concert in 1974
- Genre: Concert
- Created by: Don Kirshner
- Country of origin: United States
- Original language: English

Original release
- Network: ABC
- Release: November 24, 1972 – April 25, 1975
- Release: June 7, 1991 – September 11, 1998

In Concert is a late-night television series created by Don Kirshner. Hosted by Don Branker, the series was a showcase for bands of the era to be taped "in concert" and then broadcast on ABC on Friday nights.

== In Concert ==
The series premiered on November 24, 1972, preempting The Dick Cavett Show. The first episode was the broadcast of a concert taped at Hofstra University on November 2, 1972, with Alice Cooper, Bo Diddley, Curtis Mayfield, and Seals & Crofts. The second episode, broadcast on December 8, 1972, and again preempting Cavett, featured The Allman Brothers Band and Chuck Berry. David Sontag became the executive producer of In Concert starting with the 3rd show and for the rest of the first season. Don Kirshner had no direct connection with the show after the second episode except that the production credits listed In Concert as a "David Sontag Production" and a "Don Kirshner Production". Starting with the 3rd episode there was no host; Joshua White (Joshua Lightshow) became the director and the voice-over announcing the acts, and serving as the production stage manager was Chip Monk, often known as the voice of Woodstock.

In January 1973, both The Dick Cavett Show and In Concert became part of ABC's Wide World of Entertainment programming block. Kirshner left in late 1973 to produce the syndicated series Don Kirshner's Rock Concert. In Concert continued to appear approximately every other Friday night until it left the ABC schedule on April 25, 1975.

During its three seasons on the air, the series received four Primetime Emmy Awards.

== ABC In Concert ==
The series was revived on June 7, 1991, under the name In Concert '91. It was intended to be a summer replacement for Rick Dees' late night series Into The Night. In Concert '91 proved to be more popular and achieved high ratings for a late-night show on Fridays. Into the Night was consequently not brought back for the next season. In Concert '91 featured both newer performers (e.g. Alice in Chains, Poison) and more established acts (e.g. David Bowie, Cher, Judas Priest, Phil Collins), and was simulcast in stereo on ABC radio stations. It was renamed ABC In Concert in January 1992 and aired its final episode on September 11, 1998.

=== ABC In Concert Country ===
Created as a country music counterpart to ABC In Concert, ABC In Concert Country premiered on June 4, 1994. It was hosted by Billy Dean and featured performers such as Billy Ray Cyrus, Travis Tritt, and Trisha Yearwood. This series lasted just over two months, with its final episode airing on August 10, 1994.

== Local standards controversy ==
The first In Concert broadcast was terminated early in Cincinnati, Ohio; the station manager of then-ABC affiliate WKRC-TV was watching Alice Cooper's segment and was so disgusted by it that he called the station's master control room and ordered the station to take it off the air. A rerun of Rawhide was hastily substituted; both WKRC and Cincinnati newspapers received numerous angry phone calls in protest, which included several bomb threats against the station. The story became front-page news in Cincinnati newspapers for the next several days.
