= The George Michael Sports Machine =

American syndicated sports news TV program (1984–2007)

- Genre: Sports news
- Presented by: George Michael; Lindsay Czarniak (2004–2007)
- Country of origin: United States
- Original language: English
- No. of seasons: 22

Production
- Production locations: WRC-TV Studios, Washington D.C.
- Running time: 30 minutes
- Production company: WRC-TV

Original release
- Network: NBC First-run syndication
- Release: September 2, 1984 – March 25, 2007

The George Michael Sports Machine was a syndicated, sports-related American television program which was launched in 1984. The show aired weekends, usually on Sunday nights, and originated from WRC-TV in Washington, D.C., one of NBC's owned and operated stations. Most of the stations that aired The Sports Machine were NBC affiliates.

The show was an offshoot of a local program that George Michael, a former disc jockey who became a sportscaster, hosted in Washington beginning in 1980. Michael hosted the program for its entire run, which ended in 2007. Lindsay Czarniak, who was a colleague of Michael's at WRC-TV, joined the program as a substitute host in 2004 and became Michael's co-host in 2006.

== History ==
=== 1984–2004 ===
Shortly after Michael joined WRC-TV in 1980, the station launched the program as George Michael's Sports Final, a local sports wrapup show on Sunday evenings, following the late newscast. After a successful four-year run in Washington, NBC's other owned-and-operated stations—at the time in New York City, Los Angeles, Cleveland, and Chicago—added the program to their Sunday late-night schedules, and it was retitled as The George Michael Sports Machine. NBC concurrently began to offer the program to its affiliated stations as part of the network schedule on September 2, 1984; WRC-TV, which continued to produce Sports Machine, said that this was the first time that a network had carried a locally-produced sports show (albeit one with a national focus). In 1991, ITC Entertainment took Sports Machine into wider national syndication; at the time, the program was carried on 84 of NBC's affiliates. The show moved to Group W Productions in 1995; its successors, Eyemark Entertainment and King World Productions (both now CBS Media Ventures), continued to distribute Sports Machine until 2001, when NBC Enterprises (later NBCUniversal Television Distribution from 2004 until the show's final episode in 2007) began distributing the program.

As host, George Michael presented clips from the weekend's sporting events from across the United States and sometimes outside of the U.S. Unlike newer sports-related programming, Sports Machine did not usually present commentary or criticism and focused almost purely on the highlights, and, often toward the end of the show, an in-depth story about a particular athlete. The show was also somewhat unusual in its occasional coverage of remarkable high school sports footage, and its occasional coverage of sports largely ignored by most other sports wrap-up shows, such as hockey, NASCAR and other auto racing events, professional wrestling, rodeo, and equestrian events.

=== Influence and criticism ===
When the show premiered nationally in the mid-1980s, the only highlights available to sports fans on Sunday nights were those on late local newscasts and dedicated sports news programs (SportsCenter and Sports Tonight) on the ESPN and CNN cable networks, creating an audience niche for Sports Machine to fill. By the later years of Sports Machine, however, the rise of numerous specialty cable sports channels (notably ESPNews) and the expansion of Sunday evening local newscasts to either air an extended sportscast (an extra in common parlance) or a separate program to recap Sunday football and baseball action caused many stations to either drop the program or air it later in the night—issues made even worse in 2006, when NBC acquired the rights to Sunday Night Football, which in turn pushed late local news on most of the Sports Machine's affiliates even later.

As the number of American television stations that produced their own local Sunday night “sports extra” programs increased during the latter half of the 1980s, some that had aired the program and scheduled it as a lead-out to their local shows, such as then-NBC affiliate WDAF-TV in Kansas City, Missouri (which aired the 15-minute Kansas City Sports Machine from 1986 to 1997, running into its early years as a Fox affiliate), licensed the Sports Machine branding and format for their wrap-up shows.

An idiosyncrasy of the show was the large quantity of machinery on its set. After introducing each of the highlights, Michael would press a button which "activated" the "sports machine"—a large computer with several monitors attached to a videotape reel-to-reel—to play the clips. Michael and the producers chose the computer motif mainly because high technology was fast coming into the American consciousness at the time of the show's debut.

While the original broadcasters of the events featured on the program received proper credit within the highlight packages and at the conclusion of each broadcast, the show edited individual highlights to by cropping out or overlaying its own logo in place of the on-screen logo bugs added by the networks during the 1990s.

=== Cancellation ===
Beginning in 2004, fellow WRC-TV sports anchor Lindsay Czarniak joined Sports Machine as a contributing correspondent and substitute host, and she became the official co-host of the program in September 2006. However, this arrangement did not last long, as Michael announced on November 16, 2006, that he would retire and Sports Machine would end its 27-year run in March 2007. Michael reasoned that he would not want his contract renewed at the expense of WRC-TV's sports staff, which was slated to be reduced under NBC Universal's network-wide, cost-reduction initiative.

The last episode aired on March 25, 2007. After thanking his co-host, sponsors, syndicators and staff, Michael said this at the end of the show:

I close every show every Sunday by saying, "Thank you for letting us be a part of your weekend." Well, tonight, for the final time, we say, "thank you." Thank you for letting us be a part of your life. From everyone at the Sports Machine, have a great weekend, everybody. We hope to see you somewhere down the road of life. Thank you.

Michael then walked off camera, and was heard to say "Last one out, turn out the lights!" as the show closed for the final time.

The end of Sports Machine coincided with the end of Michael's contract as lead sports anchor at WRC, and he was replaced by Czarniak in that role. Michael continued to appear on sports panel shows and Washington Redskins-related programs for WRC-TV and Washington-area sports talk radio stations until more production and budget cuts forced those shows to be terminated. Michael died from leukemia on December 24, 2009.

Shortly after the end of the Sports Machine, Czarniak became a permanent part of TNT's NASCAR broadcasts as a pit reporter in addition to her duties at WRC. She left that position after the 2011 season. In 2011, Czarniak left WRC to take a position at ESPN and initially was an overnight anchor at ESPNews before becoming a fixture on SportsCenter, where she anchored the 6 PM broadcast with John Anderson from December 3, 2012 to January 30, 2015 and later, was the sole anchor from February 2, 2015 to mid-October 2016. In August 2017, her contract with ESPN expired.

== References and notes ==
- John Maynard (2006-11-17). George Michael to drop anchor chores, continue weekend sports panel shows. The Washington Post.
