= The CBS Late Movie =

Television series

Original title card (1972–1984).

The CBS Late Movie is a CBS television series (later known as CBS Late Night) that aired during the 1970s and 1980s. The program ran in most American television markets from 11:30 p.m. (ET/PT) until 2:30 a.m. or later, on weeknights. A single announcer (in the early years, CBS staff announcer Norm Stevens) voiced the introduction and commercial bumpers for each program, but there was no host per se, or closing credits besides those of the night's presentation. (The bumpers announcing the stars of the movie rotated names, two or three at a time, so more of the players would be mentioned.)

The program was launched following the cancellation of The Merv Griffin Show, which aired as part of the network's late night lineup from 1969 to 1972, and went on to have a long run in first-run syndication after Griffin decided to end his contract with CBS before it could cancel the talk show.

From 1972 to 1984, "So Old, So Young", composed by CBS West Coast musical director Morton Stevens and which also served as the theme for CBS' prime time movies until 1978, served as the program's theme music.

== Background ==
Until 1969, CBS programming had never ventured into the late hours. However, three years earlier, scheduling coordinators at many of the network's affiliates, who were programming old movies after nightly local newscasts, took notice of the dwindling stock of new films available for acquisition. In fact, a 1966 poll of CBS affiliates revealed that approximately 80% of local outlets were demanding the network "supply a late evening entertainment show Mondays through Fridays" to fill the growing void in newer films. Thus, CBS tentatively targeted the spring of 1968 as the premiere date for a new network late night series. But CBS spokespersons admitted they "did not know whether its show would be similar to others, but it [was] hopeful of devising something different" from the usual talk format exemplified by Johnny Carson's Tonight Show on NBC or Joey Bishop, who was about to bring his own brand of chat to ABC audiences.

In 1967, at its annual convention, CBS met with 750 affiliate executives and told them the network could provide a Carson-style late night program by the following spring—but only if 85% of station-owners would commit to airing it. Otherwise, the financing required for such a production would prove cost-prohibitive. No official poll was taken among the executives, however, and this may have been due to the fact that in 1966 when a similar offer was dangled before affiliates, only 70% of CBS stations desired a late-evening talk show. Yet in 1969, this is just what was offered to them –in the person of Merv Griffin. But despite his success as a daytime television phenomenon, Griffin's CBS ratings could never compete with Johnny Carson's consistently high audience numbers. Thus, in pulling the plug on Griffin in early 1972, CBS committed its late night programming to classic feature films as well as the debut of more recent theatrical fare.

This move proved an effective ploy because two months after The CBS Late Movie premiered, the Nielsen ratings recorded that it had drawn a larger audience than The Tonight Show. One CBS executive had a simple explanation for this sudden (though short-lived) good fortune: "People just like to watch movies."

The CBS Late Movie/Late Night block, however, was not always cleared by every affiliate of the network; in several markets, the block was either delayed by one hour from its regularly scheduled time (most notably in the Central and Mountain time zones), picked up by a local independent station (including those that later affiliated with the Fox network), or not seen at all in certain cities. Those stations that did not carry CBS Late Night instead broadcast movies from their own libraries and/or their own lineup of off-network syndicated sitcoms, drama reruns, and first-run syndication products.

A large factor in the programming decisions of many CBS affiliates electing not to clear CBS Late Night (or delaying it) was due to head-to-head competition with NBC's The Tonight Show Starring Johnny Carson, and starting in 1980, ABC News' Nightline. ABC themselves went with a similar format to CBS Late Night, with Wide World of Entertainment, which later gave way to ABC Late Night, which consisted of reruns of that network's prime time series, original movies, and some first-run programming. Preemptions and delays of the block by CBS affiliates increased during the 1980s, and into the early 1990s, as the syndication market began to grow more, and several stations deciding it would be more financially beneficial to air syndicated programming, thus keeping all advertising revenue for themselves. The debut of The Pat Sajak Show in January 1989 gained some affiliates back to the CBS Late Night lineup; however, some CBS affiliates elected to air The Arsenio Hall Show in syndication instead; in the case of CBS' Chicago station, WBBM-TV, both shows aired back-to-back after the late newscasts.

It was not until 1999, when the final stations agreed to carry The Late Late Show in its default time slot, that CBS' late night programming (excluding Nightwatch/Up to the Minute) was cleared across the entire network. Even before that, full clearance of the Late Show with David Letterman across the network (which premiered in August 1993) wouldn't happen until the end of 1994.

== History ==
=== 1972–1976 ===
First airing on February 14, 1972, The CBS Late Movie initially ran titles from a new package of MGM films that had not been previously televised. These included the Richard Chamberlain courtroom drama Twilight of Honor (1963), the original version of the sci-fi classic Village of the Damned (1960), Sidney Lumet's military prison film entry The Hill (1965), as well as two installments from the Margaret Rutherford-Miss Marple series –Murder Most Foul (1964) and Murder at the Gallop (1963). CBS' new anthology also offered packages of 1950s Warner Bros. and MGM films that, up until then, had been run only on local and independent stations but never on a network. These included the Burt Lancaster medieval action-picture The Flame and the Arrow (1950), the Randolph Scott western Fort Worth (1951), and the Richard Widmark military drama Take the High Ground! (1953). But Warners also made available a new package to viewers that showcased the TV premieres of Visconti's controversial anti-Fascist work The Damned (1969), the Beau Bridges outback adventure Adam's Woman (1969) and the Hammer-horror Christopher Lee entry, Dracula Has Risen from the Grave (1969).

As mentioned above, the first few weeks of The CBS Late Movie proved a winner with late night television audiences. Here is the lineup of feature films that initially drew viewers away from Johnny Carson and the rest of CBS' late night competition:

Aqua indicates the world television premiere of the title.
Yellow indicates the network premiere of a film that was previously shown for years on local and independent stations.
White indicates titles that had already been run on a network but had not yet been syndicated to local outlets.

1972	Monday	Tuesday	Wednesday	Thursday	Friday
02/14 - 02/18:	A Patch of Blue (1965)	The Anniversary (1968)	Twilight of Honor (1963)	The Glass Bottom Boat (1965)	The Fearless Vampire Killers (1967)
02/21 - 02/25:	The Priest's Wife (1969)	Boys' Night Out (1962)	Signpost to Murder (1964)	Trog (1970)	Village of the Damned (1960)
02/28 - 03/03:	The Damned (1969)	Please Don't Eat the Daisies (1960)	Torpedo Run (1958)	The Law and Jake Wade (1958)	Girl Happy (1965)
03/06 - 03/10:	Children of the Damned (1964)	The Last Challenge (1967)	Sol Madrid (1968)	The Sandpiper (1965)	Frankenstein Must Be Destroyed (1969)
03/13 - 03/17:	Penelope (1966)	The Venetian Affair (1967)	Come Fly with Me (1963)	Terror on a Train (1953)	Around the World Under the Sea (1966)
03/20 - 03/24:	Doctor, You've Got to Be Kidding! (1967)	Kenner (1969)	Take the High Ground! (1953)	The Green Slime (1968)	The Biggest Bundle of Them All (1968)
03/27 - 03/31:	Harum Scarum (1965)	Side Street (1950)	The World, the Flesh and the Devil (1959)	A Global Affair (1964)	Where the Boys Are (1960)
04/03 - 04/07:	Made in Paris (1966)	Crooks and Coronets (1969)	The Alphabet Murders (1965)	In the Cool of the Day (1963)	The Power (1968)
04/10 - 04/14:	The Flame and the Arrow (1950)	An American in Paris (1951)	Cry of the Hunted (1953)	Three Bites of the Apple (1967)	Tribute to a Bad Man (1956)
04/17 - 04/21:	Paris Does Strange Things (1956)	Love Is Better Than Ever (1952)	Grounds for Marriage (1951)	Watch the Birdie (1950)	Code Two (1953)
04/24 - 04/28:	Night Into Morning (1951)	Murder Most Foul (1964)	Bedevilled (1955)	Advance to the Rear (1964)	The Lost Continent (1968)
05/01 - 05/05:	Battle Beneath the Earth (1967)	The Subterraneans (1960)	Jack of Diamonds (1967)	Mail Order Bride (1964)	Westward the Women (1951)

As the graph above indicates, films that had never before been shown on television proliferated during The CBS Late Movie's first couple of weeks. But later on in this period, older films that had been run previously on local stations began to increase in number. This may help explain the decline in audience that occurred a few months after the program's initial telecasts.

Also televised during The CBS Late Movie's first five years were repeats of made-for-TV movies previously seen on CBS and other networks (including some that first appeared as an ABC Movie of the Week), and movies not well-suited for prime time due to content. (Violence was often the main factor, with true crime stories and police drama, and occasionally controversial subject matter, or strong suspense, horror, or sci-fi themes.) Among these were The Abominable Dr. Phibes, its sequel Dr. Phibes Rises Again, and Theatre of Blood (all three of which starred Vincent Price), Dr. Jekyll and Sister Hyde, The Valley of Gwangi, 7 Faces of Dr. Lao, The Creeping Flesh (with the horror team of Peter Cushing and Christopher Lee), Asylum, Baron Blood, Frogs, the killer-rats-on-the-loose film Willard and its sequel Ben.

Richard Burton's Doctor Faustus, Monty Python and the Holy Grail, and The Monkees' Head made their network television debut on this series, as did such lower-budget schlock horror films as The Giant Spider Invasion and Night of the Lepus, the latter of which featured giant rabbits on the loose, becoming a source of embarrassment for one of its stars, Star Trek actor DeForest Kelley, who refused to discuss the film later in interviews.

Well-known theatrical movies were also occasionally featured, such as the 1951 Show Boat (which had made its network TV debut on NBC in 1972, and was shown on CBS as both a Thanksgiving and Fourth of July special), the David Lean Great Expectations (1946), and a severely edited 75-minute version of the David Lean Oliver Twist (1948). Some films were seen in two parts over two nights, such as The Dirty Dozen and Grand Prix. Another older film that was featured was the 1939 version of the Sherlock Holmes story The Hound of the Baskervilles, starring Basil Rathbone and Nigel Bruce.

In 1975, repeats of episodes from the NBC Mystery Movie were added to the mix; the first of these was Banacek, which made its CBS Late Movie debut on January 7, 1975. However, these episodes were sometimes cut to fit into the 60-minute program frame (excluding time for commercials and public service announcements), especially on nights that they were paired up with another 60-minute drama.

But not all evenings were devoted to reruns of television serials, for in the summer of 1976, classic British films enjoyed a short revival on The CBS Late Movie. These included the Nigel Patrick mystery Sapphire (1959), Carol Reed's I.R.A. drama Odd Man Out (1947), and the Powell and Pressburger fantasy, Stairway to Heaven (1946).

=== 1977–1985 ===
After 1976, the show also featured back-to-back reruns of different one-hour television series, some popular (Barnaby Jones, Kojak), some lesser known (Kolchak: The Night Stalker, Black Sheep Squadron, Dan August, Harry O), and some originally made for British television (The Avengers and The New Avengers, Return of the Saint, Thriller). Repeats of several of the network's situation comedies were also shown in rotation during the 1970s and early 1980s, including The Jeffersons, M*A*S*H, Alice, Archie Bunker's Place and WKRP in Cincinnati. An original series, Behind the Screen, was part of CBS Late Night from October 1981 to January 1982. By the mid-80s, the concentration was on hit drama series such as Magnum, P.I., Columbo, Simon & Simon, Hart to Hart, and The Fall Guy.

The Late Movie's time slot was also at times taken over by tape-delayed sports events, such as NBA playoffs and finals games.

=== 1985–1989 ===
TV movies from other networks (Something for Joey, Birth of the Beatles) began to appear during the 1980s, and in 1985 the series was retooled as CBS Late Night. The expansion of cable and satellite television during the 1980s took over much of the show's movie fare, and it became mostly a haven for repeats of Magnum, P.I. although new series such as Night Heat, a production of Canada's CTV network, also aired on CBS Late Night. Adderly, Hot Shots and Diamonds, other Canadian-filmed shows, later appeared.

After T. J. Hooker was canceled by ABC in the summer of 1985, CBS picked up the show for its late night lineup, producing new episodes and a two-hour TV movie for primetime. The new shows were aired as the first portion of CBS Late Night, with each episode's runtime extended to 70 minutes to allow CBS affiliates time for increased availability for advertisements. The TV movie and the penultimate episode were both aired by CBS on May 21, 1986, with the series finale a week later.

In 1987, CBS aired an Americanized version of the BBC's long running pop music show, Top of the Pops, hosted by Nia Peeples and featuring some performances from the BBC version of the program, alongside those taped in Hollywood. The show was presented on late Friday nights and lasted almost a year.

=== 1990–1993 ===
In 1989, CBS Late Night was replaced by The Pat Sajak Show. A year later, CBS Late Night returned after The Pat Sajak Show was shortened from 90 to 60 minutes in February 1990 and then cancelled altogether on April 13, 1990. During the same two-month timespan, CBS Late Night also televised reruns of Patrick McGoohan's classic British spy series, The Prisoner (1967–68). The network also continued to show reruns of other old prime time shows such as Wiseguy and shows from other networks including Fox's 21 Jump Street and NBC's Stingray. The line-up also featured original programming; for example, there was Overtime... with Pat O'Brien as well as The Kids in the Hall and The Midnight Hour.

In March 1991, CBS retooled their late night by airing original series under a new umbrella title of Crimetime After Primetime; new shows included, but were not limited to, The Exile, Silk Stalkings, Forever Knight, Stephen J. Cannell's anthology series Scene of the Crime, Tropical Heat (shown as Sweating Bullets on CBS), and Dark Justice.

By that fall, CBS added two original game shows to the start of the late night lineup playing off the popularity of the syndicated dating game show Studs; the first to premiere in September 1991 was Personals, hosted by Michael Burger, paired a month later with Night Games, starring comedian Jeff Marder and Playboy Playmate Luann Lee as announcer. Both were adult-oriented game shows that followed a format similar to The Dating Game. Night Games was canceled in June 1992, replaced by A Perfect Score, a similar show also hosted by Marder. Both Score and Personals continued until December 1992, to be replaced by an earlier Crimetime After Primetime until being dropped for Late Show with David Letterman by the following August. Letterman's agreement with the network also came with the ability to produce programming in the hour after his show. In January 1995, Letterman's company Worldwide Pants began producing The Late Late Show with Tom Snyder for the network, which he would continue to control until James Corden's run began in March 2015, when it came under network ownership.

=== Summer 2015 ===
CBS revived the concept of running late night crime and police procedural reruns, using the umbrella title CBS Summer Showcase, in the summer of 2015 between the May 20 finale of Late Show with David Letterman and the September 8 premiere of The Late Show with Stephen Colbert, and the restoration of the Ed Sullivan Theater between those dates. From May 21, 2015, until September 7, 2015, the network aired reruns of police procedurals and scripted dramas in the Late Show slot beginning with The Mentalist (May 21–June 5) and continued throughout the summer with Hawaii Five-0 (June 8–12, July 27–31), CSI: Cyber (June 15–19, August 17–21), Elementary (June 22–26), Blue Bloods (June 29-July 5), The Good Wife (July 6–10, August 24–28), NCIS: Los Angeles (July 13–17), NCIS (July 20–24, September 7) Scorpion (August 3–7), NCIS: New Orleans (August 10–14) and Madam Secretary (August 31-September 4).

The network dismissed concerns that it could hurt the ratings of The Late Late Show with James Corden, which follows the Late Show. In an interview with Vulture, Corden stated that he would not have been interested in having The Late Late Show temporarily moved up into the Late Show timeslot instead, explaining that "if it goes really well, then I’m just bummed in September. And if it goes terribly, then I’m the guy, 'Ah, well he can’t do it,' when in fact we’re only 25 shows in." These fears were not realized, as The Late Late Show received ratings consistent with what it had garnered previously, and Summer Showcase itself usually maintained Letterman's ratings share, even beating first-run episodes of ABC's Jimmy Kimmel Live! in the ratings.

Corden subsequently used the lead-ins as an opportunity to spoof companion aftershows such as Talking Dead, with cold open sketches such as Talking Mentalist and Talking Hawaii Five-0. CBS CEO Les Moonves made a cameo appearance during the series premiere of The Late Show with Stephen Colbert, manning a lever that he could use to switch back to The Mentalist reruns if he was dissatisfied with the new program.

== See also ==
- List of late-night American network TV programs
