= Comic Strip Live (TV series) =

- Genre: Comedy
- Country of origin: United States
- Original language: English
- No. of seasons: 4

Production
- Running time: 60 mins.

Original release
- Network: Fox
- Release: August 12, 1989 – January 15, 1994

Comic Strip Live was a weekly, late-night, hour-long stand-up comedy showcase that aired on the Fox network from 1989 to 1994. It started as a local show at Igby's comedy club, originally hosted by John Mulrooney and filmed at the club. Jamie Masada, owner of the Laugh Factory, proposed that they take the show national; Fox agreed, and moved the show to the Laugh Factory in Hollywood. Mulrooney was replaced by Gary Kroeger for the second season, then Wayne Cotter for the remaining seasons.

The show was successful enough that Fox created a prime time version called The Sunday Comics.

== See also ==
- List of late night network TV programs
