= Whitney (surname) =

Whitney is an Old English surname that derives from the location of Whitney in Herefordshire, England. It was first mentioned in the Domesday Book with the spelling Witenie. The name probably refers to the River Wye which runs through the area and which can become a torrent when heavy rains in the Welsh mountains cause it to swell. This surname has also been used as a first name for both males and females, and many locations around the world have been named Whitney after individuals with this name.

== Notable people ==
- Adeline Dutton Train Whitney (1824–1906), American writer
- Amos Whitney (1832–1920), American mechanical engineer and inventor
- Arnott Whitney (1931–2024), Canadian ice hockey player
- Arthur Whitney (disambiguation), several people
- Asa Whitney (1797–1872), American merchant and railroad visionary
- Asa Whitney (canal commissioner) (1791–1874), American inventor, politician and manufacturer
- Ashley Whitney (born 1979), American freestyle swimmer
- Benson Whitney (born 1956), American businessman and ambassador
- Betsey Cushing Roosevelt Whitney (1908–1998), American social figure
- Bill Whitney (Willard Whitney) (active since 1979), American broadcaster
- Carl Whitney (1913–1986), American Negro league baseball player
- Charlotte Anita Whitney (1867–1955), American suffragist, civil rights activist, and Communist
- Chris Whitney (born 1971), American basketball player
- Cornelius Vanderbilt Whitney (1899–1972), American financier and horse breeder
- Courtney Whitney (1897–1969), American lawyer and Army commander during World War II
- Daniel Lawrence Whitney (born 1963), American comedian better known as Larry the Cable Guy
- Donald Ransom Whitney (1915–2007), American mathematician
- Dorothy Payne Whitney (1887–1968), American heiress and philanthropist
- Edward Baldwin Whitney (1857–1911), American judge and political organizer
- Edwina Whitney (1868–1970), American librarian and college professor
- Eleanore Whitney (1917–1983), American film actress
- Eli Whitney (1765–1825), American inventor of the cotton gin
- Elizabeth Whitney (treasurer) (active 1987–1989), American politician
- Elizabeth Ann Whitney (1800–1882), Church of Jesus Christ of Latter-day Saints leader, wife of Newel Kimball Whitney
- Ghostemane (born Eric Whitney), American rapper
- George Whitney (disambiguation), several people
- Gertrude Vanderbilt Whitney (1875–1942), American social figure, wife of Harry Payne Whitney
- Glayde Whitney (1939–2002), American geneticist
- Gil Whitney (1940–1982), American television weather forecaster
- Grace Lee Whitney (1930–2015), American actress
- Harry Payne Whitney (1872–1930), American businessman and thoroughbred horsebreeder
- Harry Whitney (1873–1936), American hunter and author who was in Greenland at the same time as Peary and Cook
- Hassler Whitney (1907–1989), American mathematician, one of the founders of singularity theory
- Henry Martyn Whitney (1824–1904), newspaper founder in the Kingdom of Hawaii
- Henry Melville Whitney (1839–1923), American industrialist
- James Whitney (disambiguation), several people called James or Jim
- Joan Whitney Payson (1903–1975), American heiress (née Whitney)
- John Whitney (disambiguation), several people called John or Jon
- Josepha Newcomb Whitney (1871 – after 1955), American clubwoman, pacifist, suffragist, and politician
- Josiah Whitney (1819–1896), American geologist, chief of the California Geological Survey, for whom Mount Whitney is named
- Kahlil Whitney (born 2001), American basketball player
- Katherine Whitney Curtis (1896–1979), creator of Synchronized Swimming
- Lenar Whitney (born 1959), Louisiana politician
- Marion Isabelle Whitney (1911–1998), American geologist
- Marva Whitney (1944–2012), American funk singer
- Mary Watson Whitney (1847–1921), American astronomer
- Marylou Whitney (1925–2019), American horseracing figure, widow of Cornelius Vanderbilt Whitney
- Meredith Whitney (born 1969), American businesswoman
- Mike Whitney (1959), Australian Test and ODI cricketer
- Newel Kimball Whitney (1795–1850), Church of Jesus Christ of Latter-day Saints leader
- Orson F. Whitney (1855–1931), Church of Jesus Christ of Latter-day Saints leader
- Pauline Payne Whitney (1874–1916), American heiress
- Payne Whitney (1876–1927), American businessman
- Phyllis A. Whitney (1903–2008), American mystery writer
- Ray Whitney (disambiguation), several people
- Richard Whitney (disambiguation), several people called Rich or Richard
- Robert Whitney (disambiguation), several people
- Ruth Reinke Whitney (1928–1999), American magazine editor
- Ryan Whitney (born 1983), American ice hockey player
- Thomas Whitney (disambiguation), several people called Thomas or Tom
- William Whitney (disambiguation), several people
- Willis Norton Whitney (1855–1918), American physician, Quaker missionary in Japan
- Willis Rodney Whitney (1869–1958), American scientist

== Fictional characters ==
- Geraldine Weldon Whitney Saxon (active 1970–1984), Grand Dame widow to Senator Gordon Whitney and crime boss Anthony Saxon from The Edge of Night

== See also ==
- Whitney family
- Witney (name)
- Whitley (surname)
