= David Whitney (disambiguation) =

David, Dave or Davey Whitney may refer to:

== People ==
- David Whitney (1939–2005), art critic, curator, collector as well as life partner of architect Philip Johnson
- David Russell, 5th Baron Ampthill, town councillor
- Davey Whitney (1930–2015), American college basketball coach

== Buildings ==
- David Whitney House (1894), a Detroit, Michigan house
- David Whitney Building (1915), a skyscraper in Detroit, Michigan
- Davey Whitney Complex (1975), Alcorn State University arena

== See also ==
- Whitney (disambiguation)
