= William Whitney =

William Whitney may refer to:

- William Channing Whitney (1851–1945), American architect
- William Collins Whitney (1841–1904), American politician, financier, founder of the prominent Whitney family, US Secretary of the Navy
- William Dwight Whitney (1827–1894), American linguist, philologist, and lexicographer who edited The Century Dictionary
- William M. Whitney (1828–?), American politician, member of Illinois House of Representatives
- William Fiske Whitney (1850–1921), American anatomist, curator, and pathologist
- William G. Whitney (1840–1915), American Medal of Honor recipient
- William Payne Whitney (1876–1927), American businessman, philanthropist, racehorse breeder and owner

== See also ==
- Bill Whitney (Willard Whitney), U.S. journalist
- William Witney (1915–2002), American director of serials and westerns sometimes billed as William Whitney
