= Whitney (given name) =

- Pronunciation: /ˈhwɪtni/ WHIT-nee
- Gender: Unisex

Origin
- Origin: Old English
- Meaning: "from the white island"

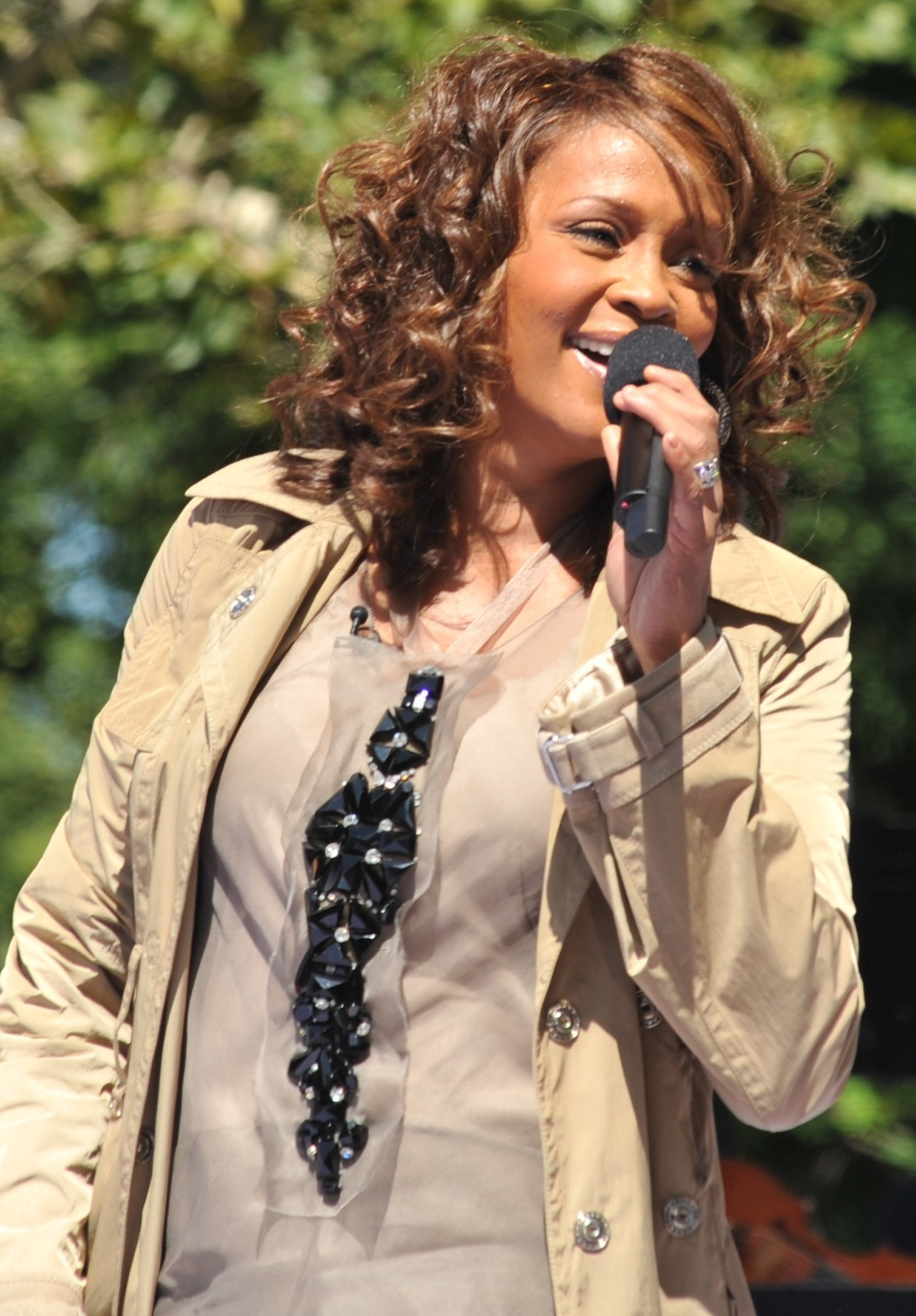
American singer Whitney Houston performing on Good Morning America (Central Park, New York City) on September 1, 2009.

Whitney or Whittney is both a masculine and a feminine given name.

== Women ==
- Whitney Able (born 1982), American actress
- Whitney Adebayo (born 1997), English television personality
- Whitney Ashley (born 1989), American athlete
- Whitney Avalon, American singer-songwriter and actress
- Whitney Blake (1926–2002), American actress and director
- Whitney Boddie (born 1987), American basketball player
- Whitney Bourne (1914–1998), American actress
- Whitney Chadwick (born 1943), American art historian and educator
- Whitney Chewston (born 2016), viral dog
- Whitney Chitwood, American stand-up comedian
- Whitney Conder (born 1988), American wrestler
- Whitney Cummings (born 1982), American comedian, actress and television producer
- Whitney Crothers Dilley, American professor
- Whitney Dosty (born 1988), American sitting volleyball player
- Whitney Duncan (born 1984), American singer and songwriter
- Whitney Dylan (born 1976), American actress
- Whitney Engen (born 1987), American soccer player
- Whitney Fitzsimmons, Australian journalist
- Whitney Gardner, Canadian author
- Whitney Gaskell (born 1972), American author
- Whitney Hedgepeth (born 1971), American backstroke swimmer
- Whitney Wolfe Herd (born 1989), American entrepreneur
- Whitney Hermandorfer (born 1987), American lawyer
- Whitney Agee Hollman, American cheerleader and coach
- Whitney Houston (1963–2012), American singer and actress
- Whitney Issik, Canadian politician
- Whitney Jensen (born 1992), American ballet dancer
- Whitney Kershaw (born 1962), American actress
- Whitney Lynn, American artist and academic
- Whitney Ann Kroenke (born 1977), American heiress
- Whitney McVeigh (born 1968), American artist
- Whitney Mélinard (born 2001), Dominican activist
- Whitney Miguel (born 1991), Angolan and French basketball player
- Whitney Miller (born 1988), American chef
- Whitney Osuigwe (born 2002), American tennis player
- Whitney Otto (born 1955), American novelist
- Whitney Peak (born 2003), Ugandan-Canadian actress
- Whitney Peyton, American rapper
- Whitney Phillips, American songwriter
- Whitney Phillips (author), American media studies scholar and author
- Whitney Port (born 1985), American actor and fashion designer
- Whitney Reynolds (born 1986), American television talk show host and writer
- Whitney Rose (born 1986), American country musician
- Whitney Rose (born 1986), American television personality
- Whitney Shikongo (born 1995), Angolan model and beauty pageant titleholder
- Whitney Sloan (born 1988), British actress
- Whitney Thompson (born 1987), American plus-size model
- Whitney Tyson, Filipino actress, singer and comedian.
- Whitney Way Thore (born 1984), American television personality
- Whitney Woerz (born 2000), American singer-songwriter
- Whitney Williams (born 1970/1971), American businesswoman and political candidate
- Whitney Wright (born 1991), American pornographic actor and director

== Men ==
- Whitney Anderson (born 1931), American politician
- Whitney Balliett (1926–2007), American music journalist and author
- A. Whitney Brown (born 1952), American actor, comedian, writer
- Whitney Ellsworth (1908–1980), American writer
- Whitney Genoway (born 1986), Canadian water polo player
- Whitney Halstead (1926–1979), American art historian
- Whit Johnson (born 1982), American journalist
- Whitney MacMillan (1929–2020), American businessman
- Whitney Mercilus (born 1990), American football player
- Whitney North Seymour (1901–1983), American lawyer
- Whitney North Seymour Jr. (1923–2019), American politician
- Whitney Paul (born 1953), American football player
- Whitney Rydbeck (1945–2024), American actor
- Whitney Shepardson (1890–1966), American businessman and foreign policy expert
- Whitney Smith (1940–2016), American professional vexillologist
- Whitney Straight (1912–1979), American Grand Prix motor racing driver, aviator, businessman
- Whitney Strub, academic
- Whitney Sudler-Smith (born 1968), American film director
- Whitney Tilson (born 1966), American investor and political activist
- Whitney Tower (1923–1999), American horse racing journalist
- Whitney Warren (1864–1943), American architect
- Whitney Westerfield (born 1980), American politician
- Whitney Young (1921–1971), American civil rights leader
- Whitney M. Young Sr. (1897–1975), African American educator

== Fictional characters ==
- Whitney, a character from the Animal Crossing series
- Whitney, a character from the PBS children's TV series Barney & Friends
- Whitney, a Gym Leader in the Pokémon series
- Whitney Dean, a character in BBC soap opera EastEnders
- Whitney Conway Ellsworth, a character on the HBO series Deadwood
- Whittney Fox, a character from Louds
- Whitney Russell, a character on the NBC soap opera Passions
- Whitney Fordman, a character on the TV series Smallville

== See also ==
- Whitney (surname)
- Witney (name)
