= Whitney =

Whitney or Whittney may refer to:

== Film and television ==
- Whitney (2015 film), a Whitney Houston biopic starring Yaya DaCosta
- Whitney (2018 film), a documentary about Whitney Houston
- Whitney (TV series), an American sitcom that premiered in 2011

== Firearms ==
- Whitney Wolverine, a semi-automatic, .22 LR caliber pistol
- Whitney revolver, a gun carried by Powell when he attempted to assassinate Secretary of State William Seward

== Music ==
- Whitney (album), an album by Whitney Houston
- Whitney (band), an American rock band
- "Whitney", by Lil Pump from Lil Pump, 2017
- "Whitney", by Rêve from Saturn Return, 2022

== Places ==
=== Canada ===
- Whitney, Ontario

=== United Kingdom ===
- Witney, Oxfordshire
  - Witney (UK Parliament constituency), a constituency for the House of Commons
- Whitney-on-Wye, Herefordshire

=== United States ===
- Whitney, Alabama
- Whitney, California, a community in Placer County
- Whitney, California, former name of Lone Pine Station, California
- Whitney, Idaho
- Whitney, Maine
- Whitney, Michigan
- Whitney Township, Michigan
- Whitney, Nebraska
- Whitney, Nevada
- Whitney Point, New York
- Whitney, Oregon
- Whitney, South Carolina
- Whitney, Texas
- Whitney, Washington
- Whitney, West Virginia

== Organizations ==
- Whitney (City Road, London), a shop founded in 1875
- Whitney Museum of American Art, a museum of American art in New York City
- Hancock Bank or Whitney Bank

== Schools ==
- Whitney High School (Cerritos, California)
- Whitney High School (Rocklin, California)
- Whitney Humanities Center, an interdisciplinary institution at Yale University

== Other uses ==
- Whitney (surname)
- Whitney (given name)
- Whitney (typeface)
- Lake Whitney (Texas), a reservoir
- Mount Whitney, the highest peak in the contiguous United States
  - USS Mount Whitney
- Whitney Awards, awards for achievement in Mormon fiction
- Whitney Biennial, a biennial art exhibition
- Whitney South Sea Expedition, a 1920–1932 scientific expedition to the South Pacific
- Whitney (Pokémon), a character in the Pokémon series
- Whitney, a character from Barney & Friends

== See also ==
- David Whitney Building, skyscraper in Detroit, Michigan
- David Whitney House, historic residence in Detroit, Michigan
- J.H. Whitney & Company, a venture capital firm in the U.S.
- Pratt & Whitney, an aircraft engine maker
- Whitney & Company (Leominster, Massachusetts)
- Whitney umbrella, in mathematics
- Whitney v. California 274 U.S. 357 (1927), U.S. Supreme Court decision upholding the conviction of a Communist Labor Party official
