= Witney (surname) =

Witney is a surname. Notable people with the name include:

- Charles Witney (1919–1991), Canadian politician
- Col Witney (1920–2009), Australian rules footballer
- Michael Witney (1931–1983), American film and television actor
- Thomas Witney or Thomas of Witney (fl. 1292–1342), English master mason
- William Witney (1915–2002), American film and television director

== See also ==
- Whitney (given name)
- Whitney (surname)
- Witney Carson (born 1993), American ballroom dancer and choreographer
