= Michael Jenkins (sportscaster) =

American sportscaster (born 1973)

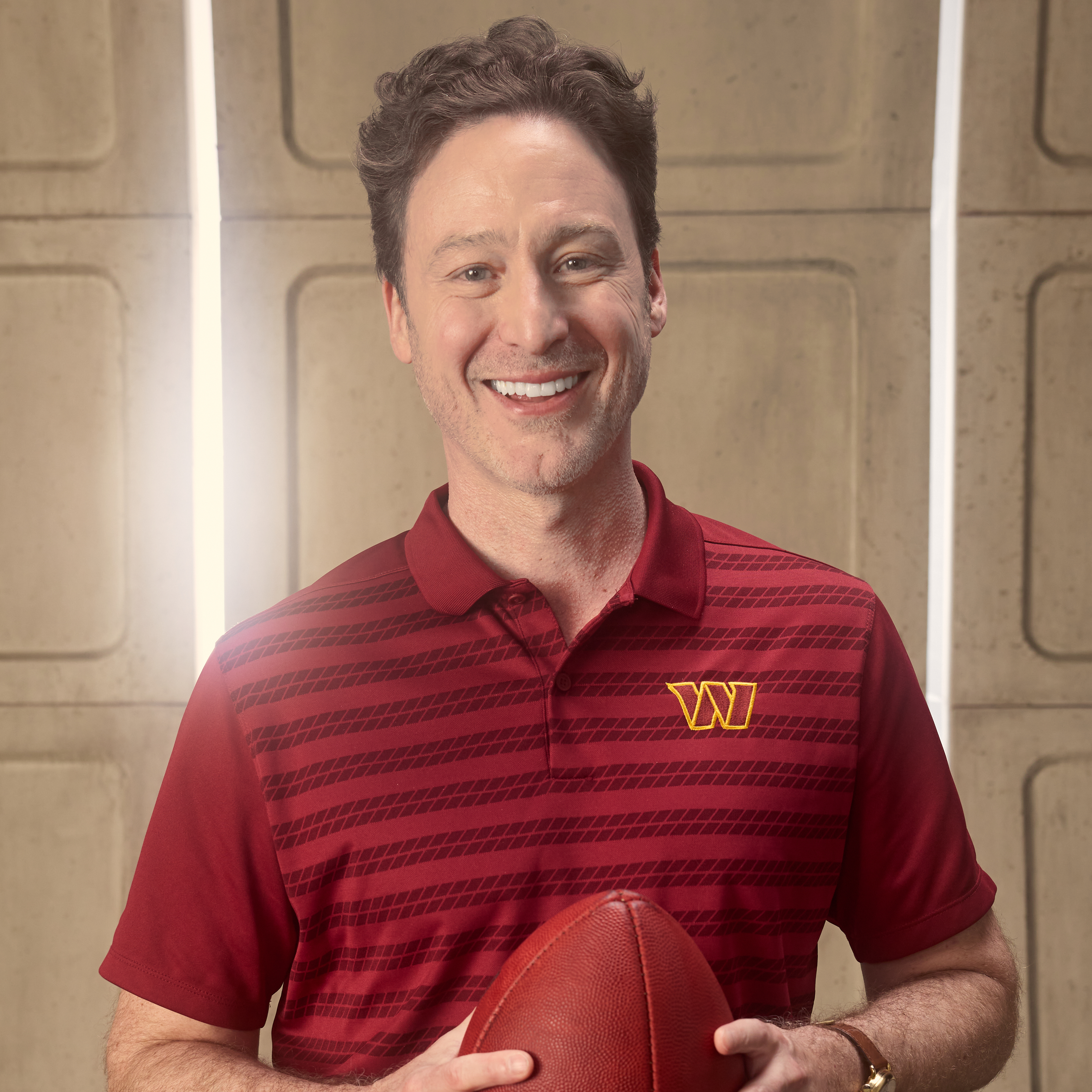
- Jenkins in 2025
- Born: December 7, 1973 (age 52); Arlington, Texas, USA
- Education: The University of Texas at Austin
- Occupation: Sportscaster

Michael Jenkins (born December 7, 1973) is an American sportscaster. He currently serves as the pregame radio host for the Washington Commanders and co-hosts the team's Get Loud podcast with Fred Smoot. Jenkins previously co-hosted The Daily Tip, a nationally syndicated sports betting radio show for Audacy, and The Daily Line, which aired on NBC Sports Radio and NBC Sports Regional Networks. He spent 14 years at NBC Sports Washington, where he anchored and reported across numerous studio and live programs.

== Biography ==
Jenkins spent much of his childhood in Breckenridge, Texas. He graduated from Breckenridge High School where he served as class president and was voted "Best All-Around" during his senior year. His broadcasting career began at an early age; as an eighth grader, he hosted a Sunday morning gospel show on a local AM radio station. Jenkins earned both his bachelor's and master's degrees in journalism from the University of Texas at Austin in Austin, Texas.

After graduating, Jenkins began his professional career as an anchor and reporter for KTEN-TV in Denison, Texas. He later moved to Boise, Idaho, and worked as a reporter for KTVB-TV.

In 1998, Jenkins returned to Austin as an anchor and reporter for KVUE-TV. During this period, he also taught journalism for four years at Austin Community College, served as a voice for the Texas Lottery, and hosted a local talent show called Gimme the Mike. While at KVUE-TV, Jenkins received four RTNDA/Edward R. Murrow Awards for excellence in both sports and news reporting and earned a national award from the National Cowboy and Western Heritage Museum for his feature on real-life cowboys.

In 2004, Jenkins moved to Washington, D.C., to join NBC Sports Washington as an anchor and reporter. During his tenure, he won nine regional Emmy Awards, including four for Best Sports Anchor, as well as honors for sports daily program, program host, sports reporting, and sports-news story. Dan Steinberg, a columnist for The Washington Post, once referred to Jenkins as "the best fan reporter in the world."

In 2016, Jenkins gained national attention when a video of him humorously pretending to drink alcohol on-air went viral following the Washington Capitals being eliminated from the Stanley Cup playoffs. NBC Sports broadcaster Dan Patrick later referred to him as "sportscasting's Ron Burgundy."

Jenkins is also a cancer survivor, having been diagnosed with a Wilms' tumor in 1981.
