= Office of Alien Property Custodian =

U.S. government agency from 1917 to 1966

The seal of the United States Office of Alien Property Custodian

The Office of Alien Property Custodian was an office within the government of the United States during World War I and again during World War II, serving as a custodian to property that belonged to US wartime enemies. The office was created in 1917 by Executive Order 2729-A under the Trading with the Enemy Act of 1917 (TWEA) in order to "assume control and dispose of enemy-owned property in the United States and its possessions."

== History ==
Sec. 6 of TWEA authorized the president to appoint an official known as the "alien property custodian" (APC) who is responsible for "receiv[ing,] ... hold[ing], administer[ing], and account[ing] for" "all money and property in the United States due or belonging to an enemy, or ally of enemy ... ." TWEA was originally enacted during World War I "to permit, under careful safeguards and restrictions, certain kinds of business to be carried on "among warring nations, and to "provid[e] for the care and administration of the property and property rights of enemies and their allies in this country pending the war."

Created in October 1917 within the United States Department of Justice, the Office of Alien Property Custodian (OAPC) ceased to exist in 1934 and its functions were delegated to the Alien Property Bureau (APB) in the Claims Division of the Department of Justice. On December 9, 1941, the APB was superseded in the Justice Department by the Alien Property Division (APD). The APD was abolished in 1942 and its functions were passed along to the Office of Alien Property Custodian (APC) within the Office of Emergency Management. APC was abolished in 1946 and its functions were transferred to the Office of Alien Property, Department of Justice. It was abolished in 1966 and most of the functions related to foreign assets control were passed to the Office of Foreign Assets Control (OFAC) in the United States Department of the Treasury.

=== Lineage of successive agencies ===
- Office of Alien Property Custodian, Department of Justice (1917–1934)
- Alien Property Bureau, Department of Justice (1934–1941)
- Alien Property Division, Department of Justice (1941–1942)
- Office of Alien Property Custodian, Department of Justice (1942–1946)
- Office of Alien Property, Department of Justice (1946–1966)
- Office of Foreign Assets Control, Treasury Department (1966–present)

== World War I ==
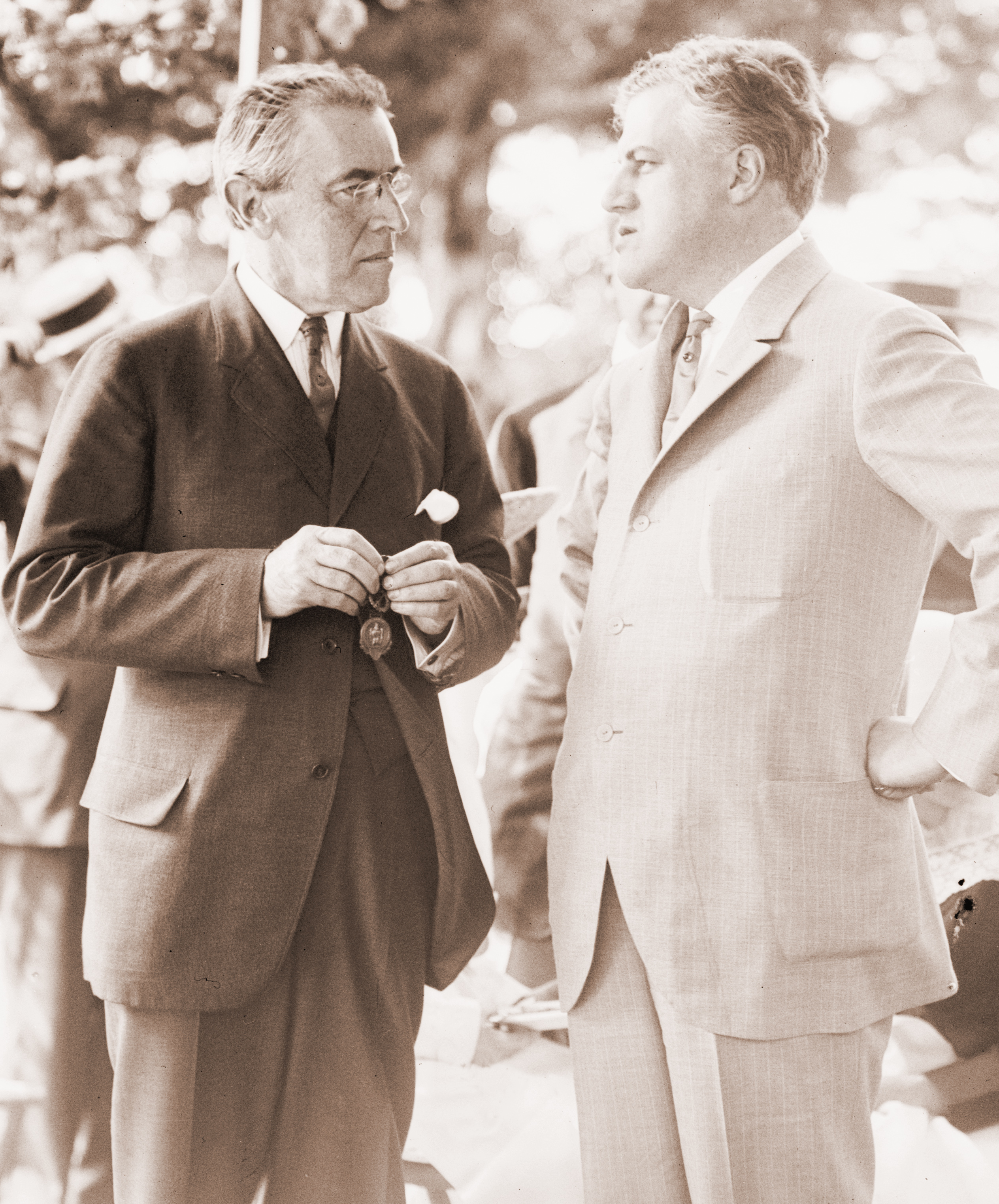
President Wilson with Mitchell Palmer, the first Alien Property Custodian

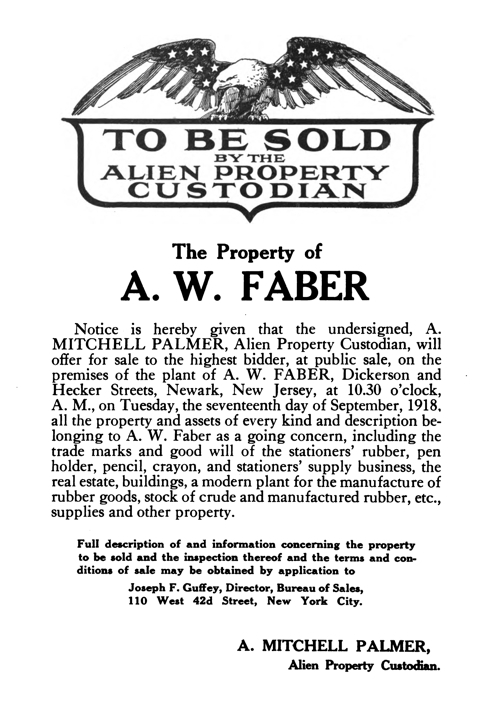
Alien Property Custodian sale ad

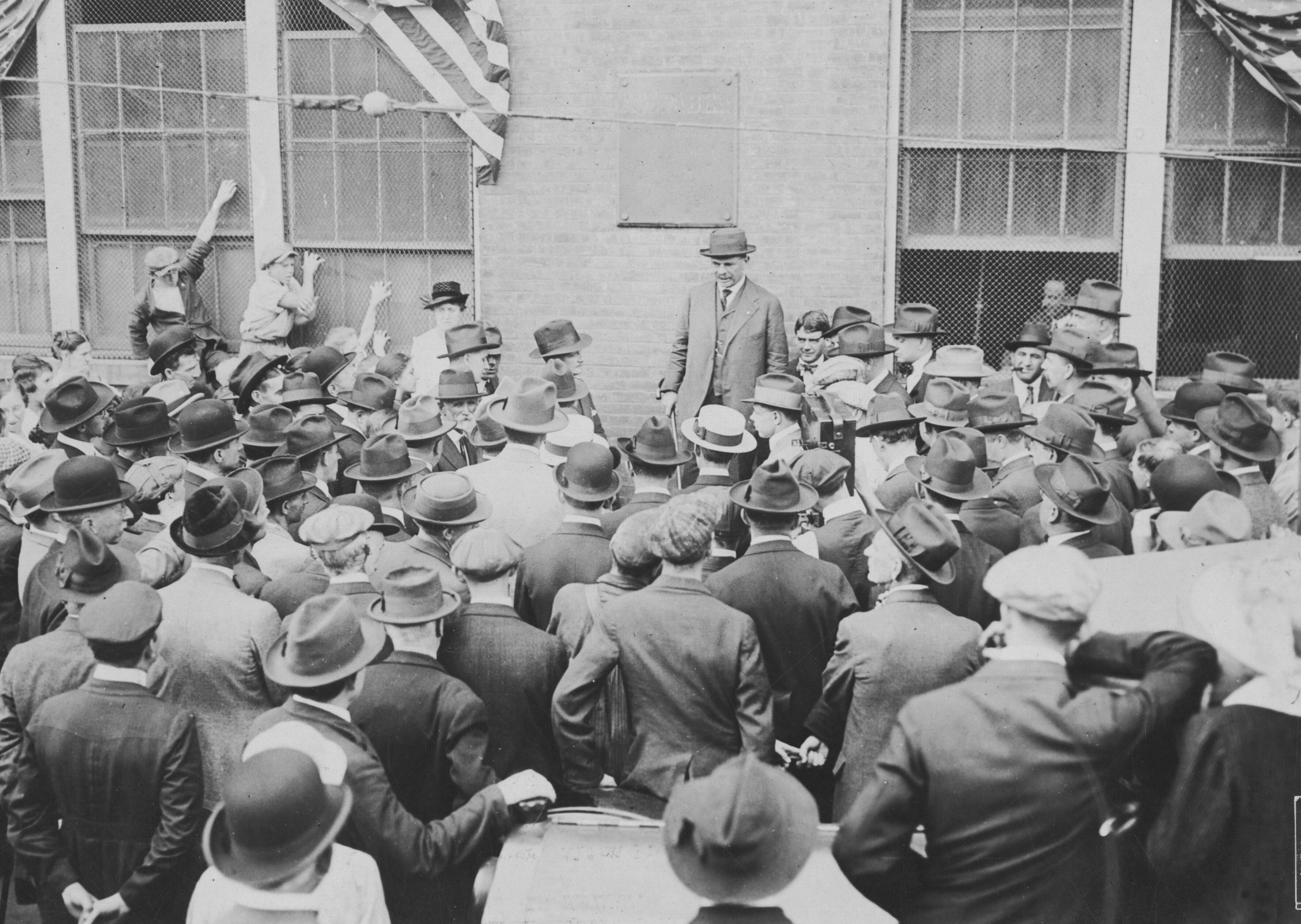
Alien Property Custodian sale of the plant of A. W. Faber Pencil Co., Newark, N.J.

President Woodrow Wilson appointed A. Mitchell Palmer, a political ally and former Congressman, Alien Property Custodian in October 1917. Palmer held the position from October 22, 1917, until March 4, 1919. A wartime government official, the Custodian had responsibility for the seizure, administration, and sometimes the sale of enemy property in the United States. Palmer was also allowed to take control of property that might hinder the war effort, including all property belonging to interned immigrants, whether they had been charged with a crime or not. Palmer's background in law and banking qualified him for the position, along with his party loyalty and intimate knowledge of political patronage. Under Palmer's leadership, the Custodian employed hundreds of officials.

=== Seized assets ===
The size of the assets the Custodian controlled only became clear over the next year. In January 1918, The New York Times wrote that Palmer's organization turned into "the biggest trust institution in the world, a director of vast business enterprises of varied nature, a detective agency, and a court of equity."

Late in 1918, Palmer reported he was managing almost 30,000 trusts with assets worth half a billion dollars. He estimated that another 9,000 trusts worth $300,000,000 awaited evaluation. Many of the enterprises in question produced materials significant to the war effort, such as medicines, glycerin for explosives, charcoal for gas masks. Others included mines, brewing, and newspaper publishing. Palmer built a team of professionals with banking expertise as well as an investigative bureau to track down well-hidden assets. Below the top-level positions, he distributed jobs as patronage. For example, he appointed one of his fellow members of the Democratic National Committee to serve as counsel for a textile company and another the vice-president of a shipping line.

In September 1918, Palmer testified at hearings held by the U.S. Senate's Overman Committee that the United States Brewers Association (USBA) and the rest of the overwhelmingly German liquor industry harbored pro-German sentiments. He stated that "German brewers of America, in association with the United States Brewers' Association" had attempted "to buy a great newspaper" and "control the government of State and Nation", had generally been "unpatriotic", and had "pro-German sympathies". Palmer wanted to seize the estate of the late Adolphus Busch, whose wife was stranded in Europe during the war, and succeeded in seizing the property of another brewer, George Ehret.

The assets of the Orenstein & Koppel Company, the Bosch Magneto Company, the Hamburg-American Shipping Line, the German-American Lumber Company, the New York Evening Mail, as well as twenty German insurance companies, were seized. Among other significant seizures, the United States assets of the chemical company Bayer were auctioned off and it lost its U.S. patent for aspirin. In April 1919, the president of the Chemical Foundation, Inc. and Palmer's successor Francis Patrick Garvan transferred 4,500 German chemical patents valued at $8 million to the Chemical Foundation, paying only $250,000; the Chemical Foundation in its turn licensed patents to American companies.

=== Disposal of confiscated property ===
Palmer said that the alien property custodian kept "the biggest general store in the country." Altogether, the United States Government confiscated close to $500 million of foreign assets during WWI. In 1921, the Congress while adopting the Joint Resolution Terminating the State of War Between the Imperial German Government and the United States of America and Between the Imperial and Royal Austro-Hungarian Government and the United States of America specified that all seized property had remained in the United States ownership; also, the Trading with the Enemy Act of 1917 was not terminated. It stayed dormant until March 1933, when Franklin D. Roosevelt invoked it to enforce a week-long Bank Holiday of 1933. In 1925, the Office of Alien Property Custodian still controlled $300 million worth of alien property, with half of that amount in cash.

=== Criticism and response ===
Later criticism of Palmer and his successors, especially Thomas W. Miller, focused less on the legality of their appointments or the fees earned by political cronies and more on sales of enemy assets. There were safeguards in place, but competitive bidding meant nothing when an auction was rigged by withholding information from all participants. More revelations took years to surface and the connections between Palmer and direct profits proved too tenuous to support his indictment. However, Thomas W. Miller was caught in the act and served jail time for taking a $50,000 bribe.

Palmer successfully campaigned to keep the powers to sell confiscated assets within the office of custodian. He promised to hinder Germany's industrial expansion after the war. Even when Germany was facing an inevitable defeat, Palmer insisted on continuing his crusade to make American industry independent of German investment, with major sales of the seized assets in the metals industry in the spring of 1919, for example. He offered his rationale in a speech to an audience of lawyers: "The war power is of necessity an inherent power in every sovereign nation. It is the power of self-preservation and that power has no limits other than the extent of the emergency."

== World War II-era ==
On 11 March 1942, President Franklin D. Roosevelt issued Executive Order 9095 establishing the Office of the Alien Property Custodian within the Office for Emergency Management under authority of the Trading with the Enemy Act of 1917 and the First War Powers Act of December 18, 1941. On April 21, 1942, an Executive order subsequently transferred to it the functions, personnel, and property of the Alien Property Division of the Department of Justice. He appointed Leo Crowley, a former banker and chair of the Federal Deposit Insurance Corporation as APC. During the war the APC amassed a vast portfolio of enemy property including real estate, business enterprises, ships and intellectual property in the form of trademarks, copyrights, patents and pending patent applications. Following Nikola Tesla's death at the New Yorker Hotel in 1943, the Custodian seized much of Tesla's work from his hotel room even though Tesla was an American citizen.

In 1947, Assistant Attorney General David L. Bazelon took over as head of the Office of Alien Property, as a result of the reorganization in Executive Order 9788. He remained in this post until he received a recess appointment from President Harry S. Truman on October 21, 1949, to a new seat on the United States Court of Appeals for the District of Columbia Circuit. Before he was seated on the bench, Harold L. Ickes, a key figure in the Roosevelt administration, indicated that Bazelon's activities as head of the Office of Alien Property warranted a Senate investigation but predicted none would be forthcoming.

Among the assets held by the Alien Property Custodian in WWII was the copyright for Adolf Hitler's book Mein Kampf, meaning that Hitler got none of the royalties from the book's sales in the United States, totaling $20,580 by 1945.

== 1950s ==
In 1953, President Dwight Eisenhower appointed Dallas Townsend Sr. Assistant United States Attorney General, heading the Justice Department's Alien Property Office, an office he held until 1960. Townsend supervised the seizure of enemy property and assets that had been seized during World War II.

Testifying before a U.S. Subcommittee in 1957, Townsend argued that a return of 10% of seized enemy property was a sufficient amount. "One of the most unfair aspects of a general return of all German and Japanese property is that it would donate huge windfalls to large enemy corporations, industrialists and their agents, many of whom were strong supporters of the militaristic and aggressive policies of the former Governments of Germany and Japan," he told Senators.

Townsend seized $329 million in proceeds of Interhandel, a Swiss holding company, saying that it was a front for the real owner, IG Farben, the German chemical cartel.

== Dissolution ==
On May 13, 1966, President Lyndon B. Johnson issued Executive Order 11281 which disbanded the office, effective June 30 of that year.
