= James Whitney =

James Whitney may refer to:

- James Whitney (politician) (1843–1914), Canadian politician in the province of Ontario
- James Whitney (filmmaker) (1921–1982)
- James Amaziah Whitney (1839–1907), United States patent lawyer and writer
- James Pounder Whitney (1857–1939), British historian
- Jim Whitney (1857–1891), baseball player
- James Scollay Whitney (1811–1878), American business executive and politician
- James Lyman Whitney (1835–1910), American librarian
- James Whitney (criminal) (c.1660–1694), highwayman from Stevenage
