= William Whitney House =

Historic house in Illinois, United States

- U.S. National Register of Historic Places
- U.S. Historic district – Contributing property
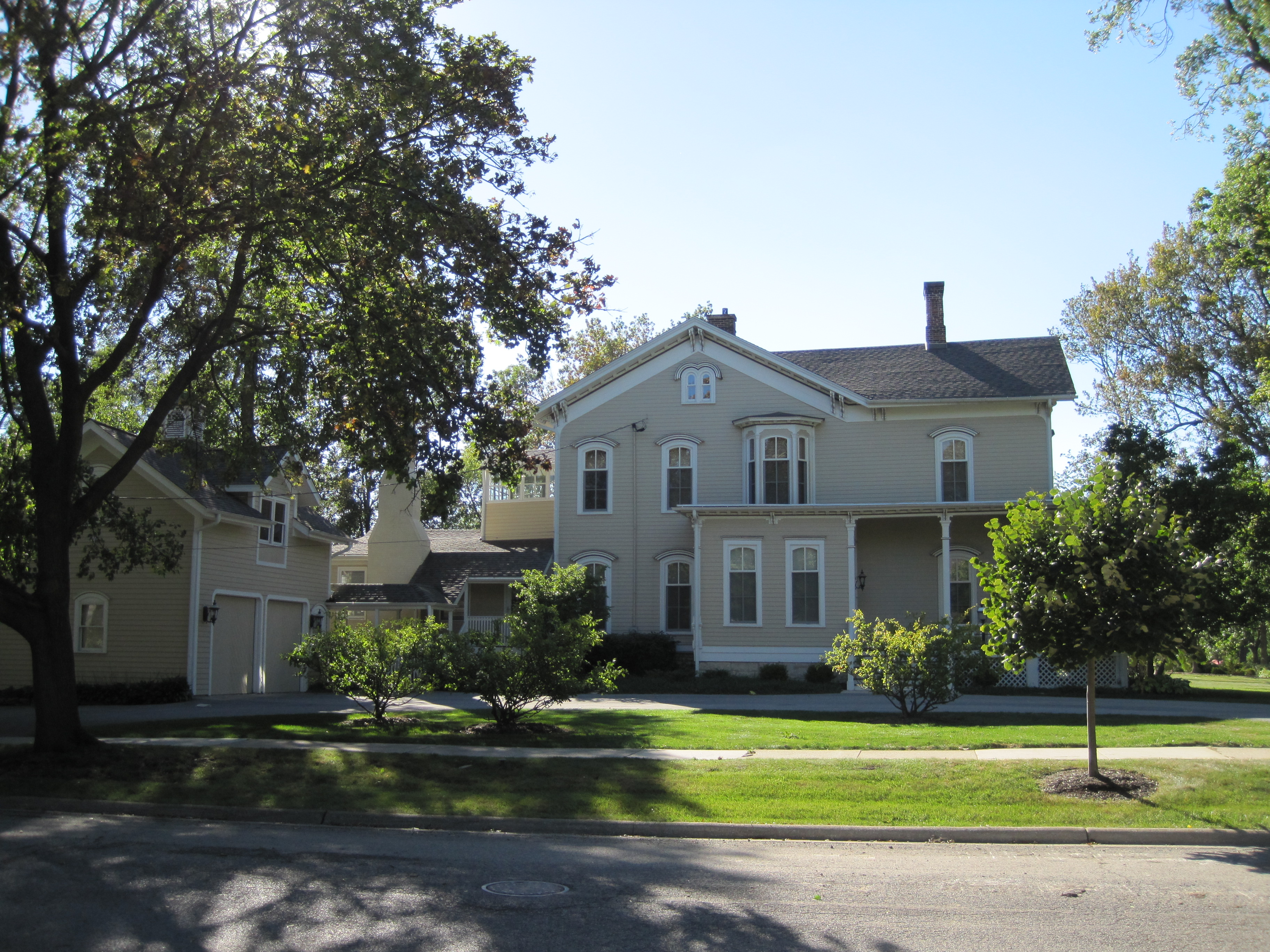

- Location within Illinois Location within the United States
- Location: 142 E. First St. Hinsdale, DuPage County, Illinois, U.S.
- Coordinates: 41°48′5″N 87°55′28″W
- Built: 1869
- Architectural style: Late Victorian and Italianate
- NRHP reference No.: 89001731
- Added to NRHP: October 19, 1989

The William Whitney House, also known as the Hallmark House, is a historic Late Victorian and Italianate residence in Hinsdale, Illinois.

== History ==
William M. Whitney moved to Winfield in 1858 and was elected DuPage County Circuit Clerk and Recorder two years later. During his term, he became involved in real estate, and platted one of the first regions of Downers Grove. He purchased a house in Hinsdale in 1867 which he sold at three times the price three years later. Now wealthy, he moved into a newly constructed house on First Street. He was elected to the Illinois House of Representatives in 1870. During his term in the House, legislature was passed allowing for certificates of incorporation. Whitney immediately returned to his home town and gained the required signatures for a petition to incorporate Hinsdale, which was approved in 1873.

The house was constructed for the Stodder family in 1869 and purchased by Whitney a year later. Whitney lost a substantial sum of money in the Panic of 1873, and was forced to sell his house in 1879 to cover overdue taxes. Eighteen families have owned the house since Whitney. The house was featured in a national television commercial for Hallmark Cards, earning the residence its nickname. On October 19, 1989, the house was recognized by the National Park Service with a listing on the National Register of Historic Places. In 2008, it was deemed a contributing property to the Robbins Park Historic District.

== Architecture ==
The house is on a 177-by-170-foot (54 m × 52 m) lot at the southwest corner of First Street and Park Avenue in Hinsdale. It is a wood-frame building, approximately 80 by 35 feet (24 m × 11 m). Most of the building is two stories; a section in the rear is only one story. This one-story section is a 1950s kitchen addition. A porch covers the front of the house, which extends to the east and west facades. The house features Italianate arch windows and cornice moldings. A two-car garage was added in 1988, replacing a 1950s garage. The second story has three evenly spaced windows on the north elevation. Two floor-length windows are found to the left of the double door entrance to the house. The doors are 9 feet (2.7 m) tall with rounded windows in the top panels. Side entrances are found along the east and west sides of the porch. A brick chimney rises through the roof. A basement runs under the entire house except under the east entrance. Basement walls are limestone blocks and irregular stones.
