= Bob Whitney =

Bob Whitney may refer to:

- Bob Whitney, character in Jungle Woman
- Bob Whitney, character in Overland Stage Raiders

== See also ==
- Robert Whitney (disambiguation)
