= Dallas Townsend =

American journalist

Dallas Selwyn Townsend Jr. (January 17, 1919 – June 1, 1995) was an American broadcast journalist who worked for CBS Radio and television for over 40 years. An award jury at Columbia University said of Townsend, "No other newsman of our day has had a broader acquaintance with news nor communicated it with more economy and precision."

== Early career ==
Born in New York City and raised in New Jersey, Townsend was the son of Dallas Townsend Sr., an attorney who once was assistant attorney general of the United States. He attended Montclair Kimberley Academy, graduating in the class of 1936. He graduated from Princeton University in 1940 and the Columbia School of Journalism. He worked as a news editor at WQXR in New York City before he went to work at CBS. After working briefly for CBS as an editor in New York City he served in the United States Army as a communications officer. During World War II, he served in New Guinea, the Philippines and Japan in signal and communication and rose to the rank of captain.

== CBS ==
Townsend was associated with CBS for over 40 years. During his tenure he worked on the CBS Radio Network's morning World News Roundup and the Roundup's evening companion, then known as The World Tonight. In addition to regular newscasts, he covered each presidential convention and campaign from 1948 through 1980 and every American space launch from 1962 to 1980.

Townsend was Alan Jackson's broadcast partner on CBS Radio on November 22, 1963, covering the assassination of President John F. Kennedy in Dallas, Texas. While Jackson anchored news reports from the wire services and from Texas, Townsend provided news and background information at various points in the initial broadcast.

== Personal life ==
Townsend and his wife, Lois Bradley Townsend, lived in Montclair, New Jersey and had three daughters and a son.

== Death ==
Townsend died June 1, 1995, of injuries from a fall that he suffered a week earlier. He was 76 years old. He was survived by his wife and four children and ten grandchildren.

== Recognition ==
In 1983, Townsend received an Alfred I. duPont–Columbia University Award for "intelligent and incisive reporting" over his career.

== Sources ==
- Princeton University Memorials
- American Journalism Review:The Last Good Meal in a World of Snacks
- Caskets on Parade
