= John Whitney =

John Whitney may refer to:

== Musicians ==
- John "Charlie" Whitney (born 1944), British rock guitarist
- John Whitney, American drummer with City Sleeps
- Jon Whitney (DJ), American DJ and musician

== Others ==
- John D. Whitney (1850–1917), Jesuit and president of Georgetown University
- John Whitney (broadcaster) (1930–2023), writer and producer involved in British commercial radio and television
- John Hay Whitney (1904–1982), millionaire
- John Whitney (industrialist) (1836–1932), New Zealand industrialist
- John Whitney (footballer) (1874–?), English footballer
- John Whitney (animator) (1917–1995), American animator, composer and inventor
- Jon Whitney (footballer) (born 1970), English former footballer

== See also ==
- John Witney, British police killer, see Shepherd's Bush murders
