= Dallas Townsend Sr. =

American lawyer (1888–1966)

Dallas S. Townsend Sr.
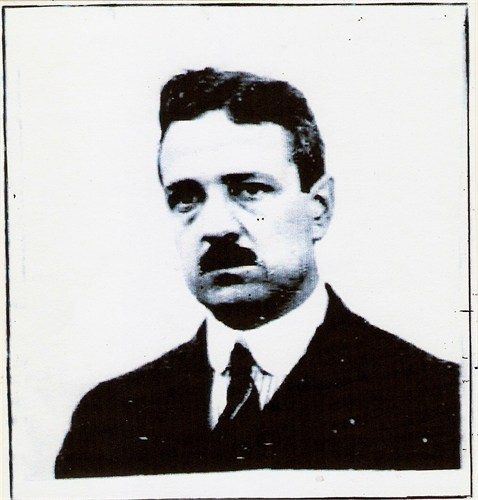

Assistant U.S. Attorney General
- In office 1953–1960

Montclair Town Commissioner
- In office 1936–1942

Personal details
- Born: Dallas Selwyn Townsend; August 2, 1888 Fayetteville, North Carolina, U.S.
- Died: May 27, 1966 (aged 77) Montclair, New Jersey, U.S.
- Party: Republican
- Spouse: Adelaide Elizabeth Henerman (1890–1962)
- Children: Dallas S. Townsend Jr., Lewis R. Townsend, Robert H. Townsend, Elizabeth Townsend MacFadden.
- Education: Columbia University, Columbia University Law School
- Occupation: Lawyer

Dallas Selwyn Townsend Sr. (August 2, 1888 – May 27, 1966) was an American Republican Party official who served as the Assistant United States Attorney General during the Eisenhower administration. He was the father of CBS Radio news reporter Dallas Townsend.

== Early years ==
Townsend was born August 2, 1888, in Fayetteville, North Carolina, the son of Richard Walter Townsend (1859–1937) and Mara Aurora McDuffie Townsend (1866–1906). He had four sisters and brothers, including Ralph Townsend. He was a graduate of Columbia University and Columbia University Law School. In 1927, he defeated José Raúl Capablanca, a Cuban chess player who was World Chess Champion from 1921 to 1927, in an exhibition match. He was a partner at Barry, Wainwright, Thacher & Symmers in New York City before starting Townsend & Lewis, also a New York law firm.

== Military service ==
Townsend served in the U.S. Army during World War I. He took part in the Meurthe and Moselle campaigns and was discharged as the youngest full colonel in the Army. He returned to active military service during World War II as a full colonel, providing staff service in Washington, Iceland and Hungary. He remained in Hungary for eighteen months after the war to serve as the deputy commander of the American Military Mission, which was part of the Allied Control Commission.

== Political career ==
Townsend was elected Town Commissioner in Montclair, New Jersey, in 1936. He served as Director of Public Safety. He was re-elected to a second term in 1940. He resigned in 1942 to go on active military duty during World War II.

In 1938, Townsend became a candidate for the U.S. House of Representatives, running in New Jersey's 12th congressional district. Republicans had held the seat from 1914 until 1936, when Democrat Frank W. Towey Jr. won it on the coattails of President Franklin Roosevelt's re-election. The seat was viewed as likely to return Republican, and six Republicans sought the nomination in the September 20 primary. His main rival was investment banker Robert Kean, the son of a former United States Senator and the scion of one of America's oldest political families. Kean was endorsed by the "Clean Government" faction of the Essex GOP, while Townsend had the backing of the "Suburban Republican" faction. Townsend lost the Republican Primary to Kean by an exceedingly narrow margin of 713 votes, 13,923 to 13,210. With Townsend's endorsement, Kean defeated Towey in the General Election.

== Assistant U.S. Attorney General ==
In 1942, President Franklin Roosevelt issued Executive Order 9095, establishing the Office of Alien Property Custodian. President Dwight Eisenhower appointed Townsend to serve as an Assistant United States Attorney General in 1953, heading the Justice Department's Alien Property Office. Townsend supervised the seizure of enemy property and assets seized during World War II.

Testifying before a U.S. Subcommittee in 1957, Townsend argued that a return of 10% of seized enemy property was a sufficient amount. "One of the most unfair aspects of the a general return of all German and Japanese property is that it would donate huge windfalls to large enemy corporations, industrialists and their agents, many of whom were strong supporters of the militaristic and aggressive policies of the former Governments of Germany and Japan," he told Senators.

Townsend seized $329 million in proceeds of Interhandel, a Swiss holding company, saying that it was a front for the real owner, I.G. Farbenindustrie, the German chemical cartel.

He served as Assistant U.S. Attorney General until 1960, when he returned to his law practice in New York.

== Later years and family ==
Townsend married Adelaide Elizabeth Heuermann (1890-1962) on November 28, 1917. They had four children, including CBS Radio news reporter Dallas Townsend. After leaving the Department of Justice in 1960, he returned to New Jersey and to his Manhattan law firm. He died on May 27, 1966, in Montclair.
