= Monumental Sports Network =

Regional sports network in Washington, D.C.

- Country: United States
- Broadcast area: Maryland; Virginia; Washington, D.C. Southern Pennsylvania; Eastern West Virginia; Southern Delaware; Hampton Roads; Outer Banks; National (via satellite)
- Headquarters: Washington, D.C.

Programming
- Language: English
- Picture format: 1080i (HDTV); 480i (SDTV)

Ownership
- Owner: Monumental Sports & Entertainment (Ted Leonsis)
- Sister channels: Cable/satellite: Monumental Sports Network 2

History
- Launched: April 4, 1984
- Replaced: The Comcast Network
- Former names: Home Team Sports (1984–2001); Comcast SportsNet Mid-Atlantic (2001–2017); NBC Sports Washington (2017–2023)

Links
- Website: monumentalsportsnetwork.com

Availability (some events may air on overflow feed Monumental Sports Network 2 due to event conflicts)

Streaming media
- MNMT+ on DAZN: www.dazn.com/en-US/welcome/monumental
- DirecTV Stream: Internet Protocol television
- FuboTV: Internet Protocol television

Monumental Sports Network (originally Home Team Sports and formerly Comcast SportsNet Mid-Atlantic and NBC Sports Washington) is an American regional sports network owned by Ted Leonsis through Monumental Sports & Entertainment. Headquartered in Washington, D.C., the channel broadcasts regional coverage of sports events throughout the Mid-Atlantic, with a focus on professional sports teams based in Baltimore and Washington, D.C., as well as sports news and entertainment programming.

Monumental Sports Network is available on approximately 25 cable television providers throughout Maryland, Virginia, and the District of Columbia, as well as parts of Delaware, Pennsylvania, North Carolina, and West Virginia; it is also available nationwide on satellite television via DirecTV. The channel reaches more than 4.7 million households in the Mid-Atlantic region.

== History ==
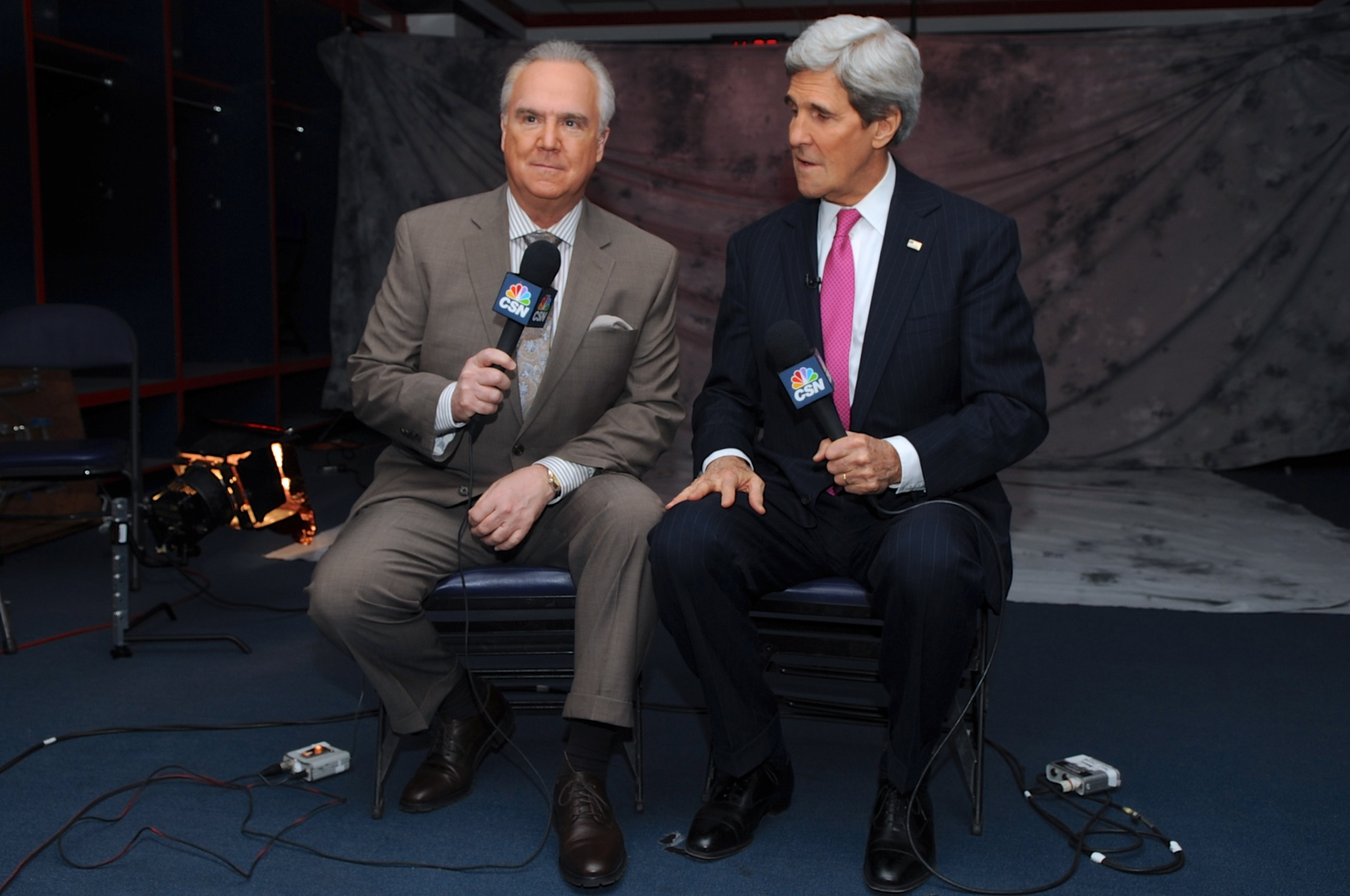
Secretary of State John Kerry being interviewed by the network before a Capitals game at the Verizon Center February 6, 2014.

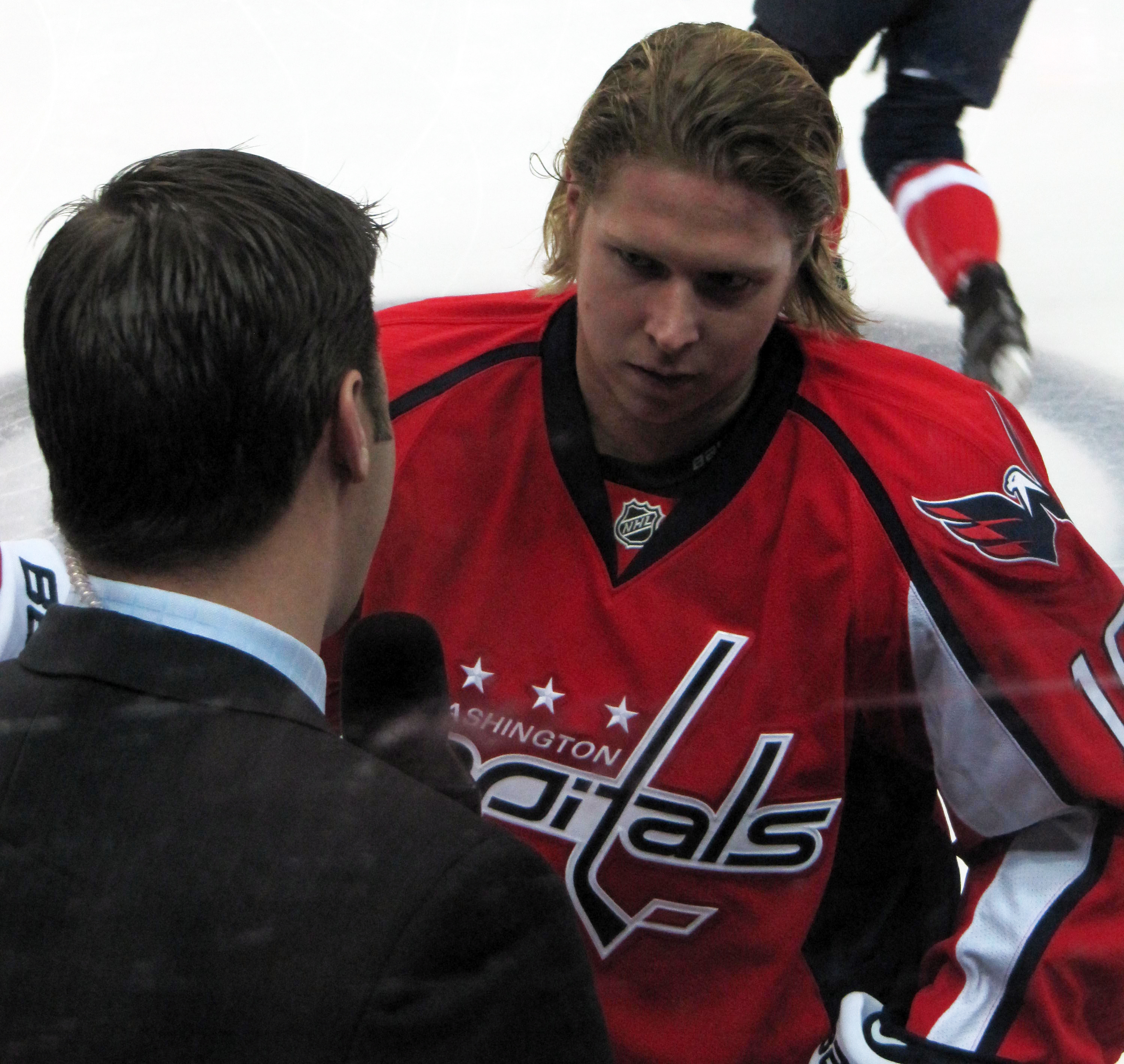
Nicklas Bäckström being interviewed during a Capitals game April 15, 2010

The network was launched as Home Team Sports (HTS) on April 4, 1984. Originally owned by Westinghouse Broadcasting, it was one of the first regional sports networks in the United States with rights to the Washington Bullets, Washington Capitals, and Baltimore Orioles. (each teams' road games were shown over the air on independent station WDCA-TV (channel 20, now a MyNetworkTV affiliate). In 1988, the network affiliated with SportsChannel, picking up their NHL package. In 1989, HTS additionally became an affiliate of the Prime Sports Network.

In 1996, the network was folded into CBS Cable, a cable television division formed through Westinghouse Electric Corporation's merger with CBS. In February 1997, Home Team Sports became an affiliate of Fox Sports Networks, a group of regional sports networks formed the previous year through News Corporation's partial acquisition of Prime through a joint venture with that network's parent Liberty Media. In 1996, Fox/Liberty had tried to secure rights to the Bullets, Capitals, and Orioles, which would have led to the launch of a new RSN. Fox/Liberty originally outbid HTS but previous contracts gave HTS the right of first refusal. Fox/Liberty filed a lawsuit against HTS which ultimately was settled. News Corporation subsequently purchased a 34% ownership interest in HTS. CBS Corporation, which remained majority owner, eventually merged into Viacom in 1999, in a deal worth $91 billion.

Shortly after Viacom completed its merger with CBS, on June 10, 2000, Viacom announced that it would sell Home Team Sports and Minneapolis-based regional sports network Midwest Sports Channel. One month later, on July 11, Comcast agreed to acquire a 75% ownership stake in HTS and the Midwest Sports Channel from CBS, in a deal worth approximately $150 million. News Corporation, which wanted to acquire full ownership of both networks, filed a lawsuit ten days later on July 21 in an attempt to block the sale of MSC and Home Team Sports.

On September 7, 2000, as part of a settlement between the two companies, Comcast traded its equity interest in Midwest Sports Channel to News Corporation in exchange for sole ownership of Home Team Sports. The transaction was completed seven months later in mid-February 2001. The channel was relaunched as Comcast SportsNet (CSN) Mid-Atlantic on April 4, 2001, exactly seventeen years after the network's original launch. The channel continued to carry national programming supplied by Fox Sports Net after the sale.

In 2010, Comcast SportsNet Mid-Atlantic split its website into two regional websites, and rebranded them as "Comcast SportsNet Baltimore" and "Comcast SportsNet Washington". While the websites were rebranded, the network continued to maintain a singular feed that was transmitted throughout its entire coverage area. Five years later, CSN Mid-Atlantic consolidated the two regional websites back together again as CSNMidAtlantic.com.

In September 2012, Comcast SportsNet Mid-Atlantic and its sister Comcast SportsNet outlets ceased carrying Fox Sports Networks–supplied programming, after failing to reach an agreement to continue carrying FSN's nationally distributed programs. In October 2016, CSN Mid-Atlantic announced that it would extend its broadcast rights to the Washington Capitals and Washington Wizards through a long-term deal with the teams' owner, Ted Leonsis. As a result, Monumental Sports & Entertainment took an equity stake in the network, while NBCUniversal took an equity stake in the Monumental Sports Network—an over-the-top subscription service focusing on other teams owned by the company.

Comcast rebranded the network as NBC Sports Washington on October 2, 2017, as part of a larger rebranding of the Comcast SportsNet networks under the NBC Sports brand.

On August 23, 2022, Monumental announced it would acquire full control of the network from Comcast for an undisclosed price. The sale was completed on September 20, 2022. On June 21, 2023, it was announced that NBC Sports Washington would rebrand as Monumental Sports Network. The name change took effect on September 12, and formally launched on September 20, 2023. The network also moved its headquarters from Bethesda, Maryland to Washington, D.C.

== Programming ==
=== Live game coverage ===
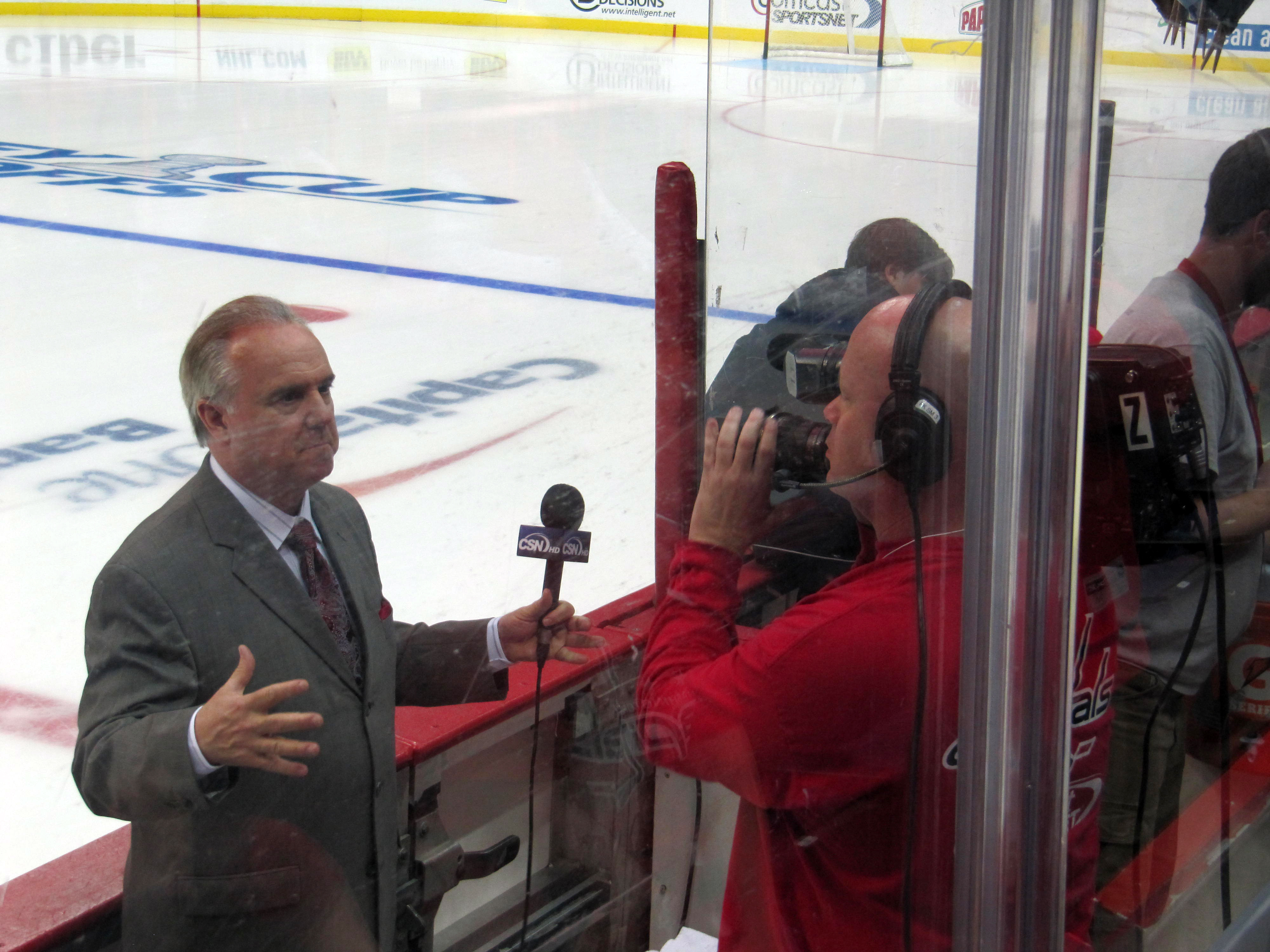
Coverage of an April 15, 2010, Capitals game

Monumental Sports Network televises more than 500 live professional and collegiate sporting events per year. The network holds the exclusive regional cable television rights to the NHL's Washington Capitals and the NBA's Washington Wizards—airing all games that are not nationally exclusive—as well as the Washington Mystics of the WNBA. The network formerly held the television rights to the Virginia Destroyers of the United Football League, broadcasting the team's games from 2011 until the UFL folded in 2012. D.C. United previously had its games televised by CSN Mid-Atlantic from the team's first season in 1996 until 2015. after which the team signed a multi-year deal with Sinclair Broadcast Group–owned WJLA-TV and WJLA 24/7 News. The network then aired games again from 2020 until 2022 after which those games moved to Apple TV+.

The network also serves as the official cable partner of the NFL's Washington Commanders, holding the rights to televise the team's preseason games; until the consummation of the 2012 merger between NBC and Comcast, which placed Comcast SportsNet Mid-Atlantic and NBC owned-and-operated station WRC-TV (channel 4) under common ownership, games broadcast on WRC-TV were transmitted in 480i standard-definition television to provide high-definition television exclusivity for the regional network. After the merger, both WRC and CSN Mid-Atlantic carry Commanders games in HD.

The network also airs a variety of collegiate events from George Washington University and the University of Richmond. The network is also the television home of Towson University football, volleyball, and basketball games. Prior to joining the Sun Belt Conference, which does not allow member schools to have local third tier rights for most sports, James Madison University football and basketball aired on the network.

=== News and entertainment programming ===
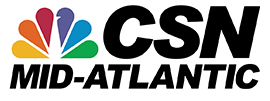
CSN Mid-Atlantic logo from December 2015 through October 2017

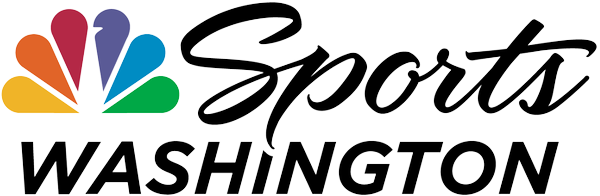
NBC Sports Washington logo from October 2017 to September 2023

Monumental Sports Network produces news, analysis, opinion, and entertainment programs focusing the region's sports landscape. The network also features special pregame and postgame shows, as well as numerous specials and original programs:

==== Current ====
- 106.7 The Fan's Sports Junkies—Television simulcast of the WJFK-FM morning drive radio show; the program airs live from 6:00 a.m. to 10:00 a.m.
- B-Mitch and Finlay— Television simulcast of the WJFK-FM midday radio show; the program airs live from 10:00 a.m. to 2:00 p.m.
- Hometown with Rachel Nichols—Interview series hosted by Rachel Nichols
- Caps Red Line—Behind-the-scenes series featuring the Capitals
- Beyond the Buzzer—Behind-the-scenes series featuring the Wizards
- By the Book—Sports betting show in partnership with Caesars sportsbook
- Beltway Football—Live podcast focused on football

==== Former ====
- Redskins Nation—Hosted by Redskins radio voice Larry Michael, the program is dedicated exclusively to covering the Washington Redskins; the half-hour program airs weekdays at 5:30 and 11:30 p.m.
- Sports Talk Live—A half-hour program featuring a mix of discussions, interviews, and feature stories that cover all aspects of the area's sports scene; hosted by former NFL running back Brian Mitchell
- SportsNet Central—The network's flagship program; a daily half-hour news program covering sports headlines and game highlights from across the region, similar to ESPN's SportsCenter

== On-air staff ==
=== Anchors and reporters ===
- Phil Chenier
- Julie Donaldson
- Brian Mitchell
- Dave Johnson

=== Game announcers ===
Washington Wizards

- Chris Miller – play-by-play announcer
- Drew Gooden – color analyst
- TBA – sideline reporter

Washington Capitals

- Joe Beninati – play-by-play announcer
- Craig Laughlin – color commentator
- Al Koken – "Inside the Glass" reporter
- Alan May – studio host & analyst
- Alexa Landestoy – studio host
- Brent Johnson – studio analyst

Washington Mystics

- Meghan McPeak – play-by-play announcer
- Christy Winters-Scott – color analyst
- Dan Nolan – sideline reporter

=== Former on-air staff ===
- Steve Buckhantz (1996–2019; Wizards play-by-play announcer)
- Scott Hanson (2002–2006; now an anchor/reporter for the NFL Network)
- Sage Steele (2001–2007; later with ESPN)
- Michael Jenkins
- Justin Kutcher (2020–2022; Wizards play–by–play announcer)

== Monumental Sports Network 2 ==
Monumental Sports Network 2 (formerly NBC Sports Washington Plus, and before that the Comcast Network) is an overflow channel of Monumental Sports Network, which broadcasts select sports events that cannot be carried on the main channel due to a concurrent live event. Monumental Sports Network 2 is carried by DirecTV and on most cable providers throughout the Mid-Atlantic region.

== Monumental+ ==
Monumental+ is a direct-to-consumer streaming service including access to all Capitals, Wizards and Mystics games that air on the network, for $19.99 a month or $199.99 a year. The service originally launched on October 10, 2023, with no specific brand name, and relaunched as Monumental+ on September 17, 2024.
