= KTEN =

Television station in Ada, Oklahoma

- Ada–Ardmore–Durant, Oklahoma; Sherman–Denison, Texas; United States
- City: Ada, Oklahoma
- Channels: Digital: 17 (UHF); Virtual: 10
- Branding: KTEN (pronounced as "K-Ten"); 10.2: Texoma CW; 10.3: ABC 10; ABC 10 First News

Programming
- Affiliations: 10.1: NBC; 10.2: CW+; 10.3: ABC

Ownership
- Owner: Lockwood Broadcast Group; (Channel 49 Acquisition Corporation)

History
- First air date: June 1, 1954
- Former channel numbers: Analog: 10 (VHF, 1954–2009); Digital: 26 (UHF, 2001–2020)
- Former affiliations: ABC (primary 1954–1977, secondary 1977–1998); NBC (secondary, 1954–1977); NTA (secondary, late 1950s); Fox (secondary, 1994–1998)
- Call sign meaning: Channel Ten

Technical information
- Licensing authority: FCC
- Facility ID: 35666
- ERP: 1,000 kW
- HAAT: 426 m (1,398 ft)
- Transmitter coordinates: 34°21′34″N 96°33′35″W

Links
- Public license information: Public file; LMS
- Website: www.kten.com

KTEN (channel 10) is a television station licensed to Ada, Oklahoma, United States, serving the Sherman, Texas–Ada, Oklahoma, market as an affiliate of NBC, The CW Plus, and ABC. The station is owned by Lockwood Broadcast Group, and maintains primary studios on High Point Circle (near Katy Memorial Expressway/US 75) in northwestern Denison, Texas, with secondary studios at the Ardmore Energy Center on Merrick Drive (near North Commerce Street) in northwestern Ardmore. Its transmitter is located along State Highway 7 in rural northeastern Johnston County, Oklahoma (west of Wapanucka and southwest of Bromide).

== History ==
=== Early history ===
KTEN's history traces back to 1952, when Eastern Oklahoma Television Inc.—a locally based company owned by Bill Hoover, C. C. Morris and Brown Morris, who also owned radio stations KADA (1230 AM) in Ada and KWSH (1260 AM) in Wewoka through their Oklahoma Broadcasting Company subsidiary—applied with the Federal Communications Commission (FCC) for a license to operate a television station on VHF channel 12 (the 1952 assignment of the frequency to the Sherman–Ada media market under the Sixth Report and Order consequently resulted in the FCC also moving the channel 12 allocation originally assigned to Waco, Texas westward to Abilene—where it would become occupied by present-day ABC affiliate KTXS-TV—to avoid interference with any Sherman–Ada station that would be assigned to that channel). Hoover's firm purchased a plot of land located 10 miles (16 km) north of Ada with the intention to build a studio and transmitter facility for the station, for which it originally filed to use KEO as its call letters. Shortly after the FCC granted the license application to the Hoover group (now given the call letters KEOK) in 1953, Eastern Oklahoma Television reached an agreement with the FCC to assign its proposed station to VHF channel 10, a second television frequency allocated to the Sherman–Ada market under the Report and Order memorandum; the group subsequently applied to use KTEN as its call sign, becoming the first applicant to incorporate their station's channel number into its call letters in an FCC license filing.

The station first signed on the air on June 1, 1954, as the first television station to sign on in the Ada–Sherman market, Originally based out of studio facilities located on Arlington Street in Ada (which continues to serve as its city of license to this day), channel 10 originally maintained a primary affiliation with ABC, with programming from NBC airing on a secondary basis; this was very unusual for a two-station market, especially a small DMA the size of Sherman–Ada. During the late 1950s, it was also briefly affiliated with the NTA Film Network. Prior to the sign-on of KTEN, Texoma area residents were only available to receive over-the-air television service via stations based in the adjacent Oklahoma City, Dallas–Fort Worth and Wichita Falls–Lawton markets; even still, these stations only provided Grade B coverage at best in the northern and western counties of south-central Oklahoma and in parts of north-central Texas; reception of these fringe stations requiring a strong outdoor antenna in Ardmore, Tishomingo and Sulphur, Oklahoma, Gainesville and Denison, Texas, and surrounding areas.

Among KTEN's earliest personalities was Churches of Christ televangelist Mack Lyon, who began his television career with channel 10 as a producer and speaker for a religious program which aired on the station. It was the first regularly scheduled television program produced by the ministry. From the fall of 1980 until 1982, during the tail end of his tenure as the church's pastor, Lyon hosted a weekly ministry program by the Wewoka Church of Christ that also aired locally on KTEN. Lyon would become known among national audiences after he started In Search of the Lord's Way, a syndicated weekly program that he developed as a television outreach of the Edmond Church of Christ in 1982, which Lyon hosted until 2010, when he retired and Phil Sanders replaced him as host; in addition to its carriage on local commercial and independent religious television stations throughout North America, Search also aired nationally on the now-defunct American Christian Television System (ACTS) during the early- and mid-1990s.

Channel 10 would eventually gain a competitor when a consortium led by Maurine Easley and Albert Riesen, the daughter and son-in-law of John Easley, longtime owner of The Ardmoreite and radio station KVSO (1240 AM), signed on KVSO-TV (channel 12, now KXII) in Ardmore on August 12, 1956; KVSO assumed the local rights to NBC programming from KTEN, and also served as a secondary CBS affiliate. On June 1, 1964, Eastern Oklahoma Television commenced construction on a new studio and production facility for KTEN on 1600 Arlington Street in Ada. When the studio opened the following year, it was dedicated in an opening ceremony by actor Clint Walker (then the star of the ABC western series Cheyenne) and television and radio journalist Paul Harvey. KTEN would eventually gain a third radio sister in 1967, when Hoover's Oklahoma Broadcasting group signed on KEOR (1000 AM) in Atoka.

=== As a primary NBC/secondary ABC affiliate ===
By the time KXII disaffiliated from the network to exclusively align with CBS in 1977, KTEN began carrying a larger proportion of NBC programming within its schedule. Over time, channel 10 had aired the majority of the daytime and prime time program offerings from both NBC and ABC. From 1977 to 1980, it even aired the national evening newscasts from both networks in the hour preceding its local newscast at 6 p.m. (with ABC's World News Tonight airing at 5, followed by NBC Nightly News at 5:30 p.m.). The station received national attention in 1983, when Doc Severinsen, who was sitting in for Johnny Carson's sidekick Ed McMahon on the noted episode, welcomed KTEN as the newest station to begin carriage of NBC's The Tonight Show Starring Johnny Carson. KTEN's acquisition of the late-night talk show occurred after KXII—which had whittled its clearance of NBC programs within its schedule down to just two shows by this time—opted to begin clearing CBS's late night schedule in a move that eventually led channel 12 toward exclusively aligning with CBS in 1985.

Although KTEN and KXII had theoretically been direct competitors for many years, the 50-mile (80 km) difference between their respective transmitter sites created disproportionate over-the-air reception of the two stations. Viewers living in parts of south-central Oklahoma close to KXII's transmitter (such as Ardmore, Madill and Durant) experienced fair to poor signal reception of the KTEN signal, which in turn had almost non-existent coverage in some adjoining areas of north-central Texas. Conversely, Ada and surrounding areas on the Oklahoma side of the market had poor over-the-air reception of KXII, as those areas lied on the northern fringe of that station's signal coverage radius. In order to become more competitive with KXII, in 1983, the FCC granted Eastern Oklahoma Television a permit to construct a 1,059-foot-tall (323 m) tower north of Milburn, Oklahoma, which would operate at 316,000 watts of power (the maximum power allowable for stations broadcasting on VHF channels 7–13). The new tower, from which the station began operating its transmitter the following year, would provide better over-the-air reception to areas of far southern Oklahoma located near the Red River (including Ardmore, Durant, Madill, Atoka and parts of Hugo) and extend its reach across the river to the Sherman-Denison area and adjoining areas of north-central Texas (including Gainesville, Bonham, and Paris), where reception of KTEN had previously been marginal if not non-existent.

On February 3, 1985, Eastern Oklahoma Television sold the station to Channel 10 L.P. (later renamed KTEN Television L.P.), a consortium headed by a group of investors led by Durant businessman Tom Johnson, along with Madill-based businessmen Allen Wheeler, John Massey, David Webb and Phillip Stumpff. Johnson planned to take over as the station's general manager, based out of a satellite office in Durant; FCC approval of the sale, however, was held up for three years and did not occur until November 16, 1988. As a condition of approval, the Johnson-led group stated that it would open a secondary studio facility for KTEN on Merrick Drive (near North Commerce Street) in Ardmore, which opened in October 1985. In January 1986, KTEN opened a tertiary studio facility in the Katy Depot in downtown Denison, which originally housed a news bureau and certain back office operations; the Ada facility would remain in operation as the base of channel 10's news operations, and its programming, master control and advertising sales departments.

In 1992, KTEN Television L.P. filed a Chapter 11 bankruptcy claim and a petition for financial reorganization to the U.S. Bankruptcy Court for the Western District of Oklahoma. As part of the group's reorganization plan, Tom Johnson and his business partner, Dennis Hall, secured commitments from Durant-based First National Bank and Durant Bank & Trust totaling $1.16 million to acquire an interest in the KTEN Television group's assets; in the winter of late 1992, the group sought permission from the Oklahoma Industrial Finance Authority (OIFA) to provide an additional $1.05 million to the $5 million in loans needed to finance the purchase. The OIFA approved the loan request on February 24, 1993, on the provision that Johnson approach an Ada-based bank to obtain a loan for the remaining $1 million to complete the transaction and that the trust authority be paid in full in the form of a balloon payment by year three of the 15-year loan term.

In May 1993, KTEN adopted a 24-hour-a-day programming schedule, initially filling overnight time periods following the NBC late night lineup with a mix of syndicated programs and movies. By this time, KTEN was gravitating toward becoming a primary NBC affiliate, but continued to carry a large proportion of ABC's schedule; the station even incorporated localized versions of promotional image campaigns produced by both networks. (The station later began clearing ABC's overnight newscast, World News Now, in the time period originally occupied by the overnight film showcases in July 1994.) Although KTEN's programming schedule appeared to be transitioning its network allegiance exclusively to NBC by the early to mid-1990s, another network move was made along the way.

==== Tertiary affiliation with Fox ====
In July 1994, KTEN began maintaining a second primary affiliation with the Fox Broadcasting Company, a move it made (on May 24 of that year) in part to regain some financial footing by way of the monetary compensation that the station would be given by Fox. Because the Sherman–Ada market did not have enough commercial television stations to sustain an exclusive affiliation, Texoma area residents could only watch Fox network programming via the network's cable feed, Foxnet, or through out-of-market affiliates—KOKH-TV in Oklahoma City, KJTL in Wichita Falls or Fox owned-and-operated station KDAF [now a CW affiliate] in Dallas–Fort Worth—that provided a Grade B over-the-air signal in certain areas or were available on local cable providers.

Another major incentive was that, through both NBC (which then held the broadcast television rights to the American Football Conference [AFC]) and Fox (which was awarded the contractual rights to the National Football Conference (NFC) television package in a $1.58-billion bid on December 18, 1993), KTEN would uniquely be able to show every single Dallas Cowboys game that the National Football League (NFL) permitted to air on its broadcast television rightsholders; the Cowboys had most of their games carried locally by KXII from 1962 until CBS lost the rights to the NFC package in 1993. Around the time KTEN joined Fox, in order to boost the network's standing as it assumed the NFC contract, the network had begun a gradual process of moving its programming to television stations that were legacy affiliates of either ABC, NBC or CBS in approximately 30 markets throughout the United States. These transactions largely resulted from a group-wide affiliation agreement with New World Communications – then in the midst of acquiring CBS affiliate KDFW, which replaced KDAF as Dallas–Fort Worth's Fox affiliate in July 1995, from Argyle Television – that commenced the same month, and a subsequent deal with SF Broadcasting, a joint venture between Fox and Savoy Pictures, that began the following year.

The downside of the deal was that the station was becoming even more of a hybrid network affiliate, adding to any existing confusion among viewers; it carried the majority of the NBC programming lineup and the entirety of Fox's schedule as well as a handful of ABC programs. NBC programs preempted by KTEN during the next four years mainly consisted of NBC Nightly News, daytime talk and game shows, and (on some occasions) sports events offered by the network on weekends. In contrast, KTEN cleared the entire Fox prime time lineup, but the vast majority of these programs were shown out of pattern after its late-evening newscast; however, it broadcast some Fox shows—including such high-profile series as Beverly Hills, 90210, The Simpsons, Cops and America's Most Wanted—in their recommended evening time slots (most commonly on Fridays and Saturdays, when it carried the network's full prime time schedule in place of the first two hours of NBC's evening lineup).

KTEN's Saturday morning schedule consisted of Fox Kids' weekend block and about one hour of the ABC Saturday Morning (later Disney's One Saturday Morning) lineup in lieu of the TNBC block. The station's other remaining ABC offerings by this time had been whittled down to daily news programs World News Tonight and World News This Morning, select daytime shows (including soap operas General Hospital and All My Children) and a handful of prime time shows (such as 20/20, Home Improvement and Ellen). Similar to the station's earlier carriage of NBC and ABC's evening newscasts during the late 1970s, KTEN also aired the national early-morning newscasts from both networks in the hour preceding its original local morning newscast at 6:30 a.m. (with ABC's World News This Morning airing at 5:30 a.m., followed by NBC News at Sunrise at 6 a.m.). Like it did with many of the Fox programs that the station carried, KTEN aired some ABC programs (including certain shows that it cleared for broadcast in prime time) on tape delay. As area residents could do to watch Fox programs that KTEN aired out of their normal timeslots through the network's adjacent-market affiliates, viewers who wanted to see the preempted ABC programs "live" could watch either KOCO-TV in Oklahoma City, KSWO-TV in Lawton or WFAA in Dallas–Fort Worth, while most of the preempted NBC programs could be viewable through KFOR-TV, KFDX-TV or KXAS-TV from the respective markets.

=== Lockwood Broadcast Group ownership, exclusive NBC affiliate ===
On March 23, 1998, KTEN Television L.P. sold the station to Hampton, Virginia–based Lockwood Broadcast Group for $15.125 million. The acquisition, which was finalized in July of that year, was financed in part through proceeds from the company's December 1997 sale of religious independent station WJCB (now Ion Television owned-and-operated station WPXV-TV) in Norfolk–Hampton Roads, Virginia, to Paxson Communications (now Ion Media Networks), a sale which occurred ten months after Lockwood had acquired that station from Tidewater Christian Communications. For most of its history under the group's ownership, KTEN was the only television station owned by Lockwood that was affiliated with one of the Big Four television networks; this status lasted until 2015, when Lockwood purchased ABC affiliate KAKE-TV in Wichita, Kansas, and its satellites from Gray Television on October 1 of that year (as part of a $11.2-million trade deal involving Lockwood-owned CW affiliate WBXX-TV in Knoxville, Tennessee).

With the station becoming more financially stable under Lockwood, KTEN disaffiliated from ABC and Fox in September of that year, resulting in the station exclusively aligning with NBC; at that point, it began carrying the vast majority of the network's programming schedule, although it continued to preempt the network's daytime talk programs until the end of the decade, although it delayed that block to the early morning by that time. The disaffiliation from ABC had left the Sherman–Ada market as one of several markets in the United States ranked below #80 by Nielsen Media Research that had affiliations with only two of the Big Four television networks. The network's absence was made more apparent by the time that KTEN and KXII respectively launched digital subchannels affiliated with The CW, Fox and MyNetworkTV in 2006, as the two stations had maintained affiliations with five of the six major broadcast networks (NBC, CBS, Fox, The CW and MyNetworkTV); KTEN would eventually reunite with ABC in May 2010, when the station converted its DT3 subchannel into an affiliate of the network. On August 1, 2002, the station began construction on a new 16,000-square-foot (1,500 m^{2}) studio at 10 Highpoint Circle (near US 75) in Denison, Texas to house the station's newsroom and production studios as well as its management offices, and engineering and master control departments (the Ada facility would continue to house advertising sales offices after the new facility was completed); KTEN migrated its primary studio operations from the Katy Depot to the Highpoint Circle building on November 18, 2002.

As heavy thunderstorms moved through the Texoma area, a lightning bolt carrying a positive electrical charge (measured at 386 kA, accompanied by a thunderclap that was heard up to two miles (3.2 km) away from the studio) struck KTEN's High Point Circle studios at 11:54 p.m. on March 23, 2013. The strike caused significant damage to the station's master control equipment and playback servers, displaced panels from some of the equipment racks, and tossed the motor from the station's tower camera into the roof of the studio building; a second lightning strike disabled KTEN's microwave relay transmitter. The station restored its direct-to-cable feeds for its NBC, ABC and CW channels on the evening of March 24, albeit with syndicated programming substituting regular newscasts (initial plans were to resume its newscasts on March 24, which were postponed following the discovery of additional equipment damage; pre-recorded newscasts were posted on the station's website for the next week). Repairs to and replacement of the damaged production equipment were completed by April 1, at which point the station resumed over-the-air transmissions of all three channels at full power.

== KTEN-DT3 ==
KTEN-DT3, branded alternatingly as ABC Texoma and as ABC 10, is the ABC-affiliated third digital subchannel of KTEN, broadcasting in high definition on channel 10.3.

KTEN launched a tertiary digital subchannel on virtual channel 10.3 on September 18, 2006, which originally operated as a 24-hour simulcast of the station's Doppler radar system (then branded as "SkyAlert 10 TrueView Doppler 10/4"), which was accompanied by an audio simulcast of Ardmore-based NOAA Weather Radio station KXI57. Other programming carried on the subchannel during this period included a limited amount of paid programming, educational programs that it aired on Saturday mornings to fulfill Children's Television Act requirements, and occasional sports telecasts from Raycom Sports' SEC Network. On April 4, 2010, Lockwood Broadcast Group reached a long-term agreement with the Disney-ABC Television Group to provide ABC network programming over its DT3 subchannel over KTEN-DT3, a transaction that would mark the return of an in-market ABC station in Ada–Sherman after a twelve-year absence.

After KTEN terminated its affiliation contract with ABC in September 1998, because the market did not have enough commercial television stations to support exclusive affiliations with all four major broadcast networks, viewers in the Ada–Sherman television market were only able to receive ABC programming through local cable providers, by way of out-of-market affiliates such as WFAA in Dallas–Fort Worth and KOCO-TV in Oklahoma City (the ABC station that was available on the local cable provider varied depending on the subscriber's geographic location within the market: WFAA, which maintains marginal to absent over-the-air coverage, even with amplified outdoor antennas, north of a line from Muenster to Whitewright, Texas, was mainly carried in far south-central Oklahoma and north-central Texas from Ardmore southward, while KOCO was carried in most of south-central Oklahoma's northernmost counties from Ada southward to Ardmore). Lockwood helped finance the infrastructure needed for KTEN's ABC subchannel (including costs to construct an extension to the High Point Circle facility that would house a secondary studio for KTEN-DT3's newscasts) through a grant from the Denison Development Alliance, a local chamber organization that advocates for business development in the Denison area, along with investments made by Lockwood management.

KTEN-DT3 converted into an ABC affiliate at 5 a.m. on May 9, 2010. With the conversion into a major network affiliate, the subchannel—which became branded as "ABC Texoma"—adopted a general entertainment programming format that primarily features a mix of first-run syndicated talk shows, game shows and newsmagazines, with infomercials and other paid programming filling much of KTEN-DT3's weekend schedule outside of local newscasts and ABC network programs. The subchannel was initially available only on Cable One's Sherman, Ada and Ardmore systems as well as other cable providers within the market (including Allegiance Communications, Communicom's Durant system, TV Cable of Grayson County and Suddenlink Communications); KTEN-DT3 was added by Dish Network on May 26, 2010, followed by its addition to DirecTV in June of that year.

== Programming ==
=== Network programming ===
KTEN clears the entire NBC network schedule, albeit with some of the network's programs airing out of pattern. The station airs NBC News Daily "live" from the network feed at noon (most NBC stations carry the programs one to two hours later). It also delays NBC's weekday overnight lineup by one hour, opting instead to air syndicated programming in the hour after Last Call with Carson Daly, while the overnight block's weekend schedule is delayed by between 2 1/2 and three hours depending on the night for the same reason.

KTEN-DT2 carries the entire CW network schedule, although it preempts a half-hour of syndicated programming carried by the CW Plus source feed (usually consisting of off-network sitcoms) each night (except Saturdays) in order to carry a 9 p.m. newscast produced by its parent station.

KTEN-DT3 clears the entire ABC network schedule, although it airs the Weekend Adventure block and This Week one hour earlier than their respective recommended time slots on both Saturdays and Sundays (transmitting them live under the network's Eastern Time Zone scheduling for both the Saturday morning E/I block and Sunday morning talk show).

=== Sports programming ===
Since 1994, when the station acquired a part-time affiliation with Fox, KTEN has served as the official television partner of the Dallas Cowboys. By way of the team's television production unit, channel 10 holds local broadcast rights to various team-related programs that air during the regular season (including the Cowboys Postgame Show, Special Edition with Jerry Jones and the head coach's weekly analysis program The Jason Garrett Show, along with specials such as the Making of the Dallas Cowboys Cheerleaders Calendar and postseason team reviews) as well as preseason games that are not televised nationally on broadcast or cable television. The rights to most of the team-produced broadcasts, particularly pertaining to Cowboys preseason games, would migrate to KTEN-DT3 in September 2010.

KTEN also carries certain regular season games in which the Cowboys are a participant over its main channel via NBC's contractual rights to the Sunday Night Football package, consisting of both games involving the team's NFC opponents and interconference games against teams in the American Football Conference. Most regular season Cowboys game telecasts air on KXII-DT3, through Fox's broadcast rights to the National Football Conference, with some interconference games involving AFC opponents airing on KXII's main channel through CBS' contractual rights to the NFL.

=== News operation ===
As of March 2025, KTEN presently broadcasts 22 hours of locally produced newscasts each week for its main channel (with four hours each weekday and one hour each on Saturdays and Sundays). In addition, the station produces three hours of locally produced newscasts each week for KTEN-DT2 (with a half-hour each on weekdays and Sundays), and 17 hours of newscasts each week for KTEN-DT3 (with three hours on weekdays and one hour each on Saturdays and Sundays). KTEN-DT3 also airs live newscasts normally seen on channel 10.1 in the event that a sporting event or other special programming delays newscasts seen on the main channel; the newscasts will then also be recorded to be rebroadcast on KTEN after the event. Channel 10 may also simulcast long-form severe weather coverage on KTEN-DT3 in the event that a tornado warning is issued for any county in its viewing area of south-central Oklahoma and far north-central Texas. The station does not produce weather inserts – live or pre-recorded – during the weekend editions of NBC's Today, instead running the program's placeholder national weather map and ancillary story segments during the time normally allocated by the program for affiliates to air local news and weather inserts.

During the 1970s, KTEN acquired a remote newsgathering unit to provide coverage of news events throughout the viewing area. In the mid-1980s, KTEN took advantage of newly implemented FCC rules that permitted translator stations to provide localized content for their individual area of service. In 1985, the station opened a small studio facility and news bureau for its translator K08KK in Paris, Texas, from which KTEN began producing a brief news and weather segment that would air on the repeater during channel 10's 10 p.m. newscast. This insert was discontinued by the station in the late 1980s due to a lack of advertiser support. At the time the station opened the Merrick Drive facility in Ardmore in 1985, KTEN used the facility primarily to operate a bureau to gather news content for Carter County and surrounding areas on the Oklahoma side of the market; the station hired two full-time reporters and photographers from the Ardmore Energy Center (KTEN also maintains a satellite sales office within the building). Prior to becoming the station's main studio complex by the early 1990s, the Katy Depot facility in Denison initially also served as a bureau for Grayson County and surrounding areas of north-central Texas, also maintaining two reporters and a photographer as well as a satellite sales office.

In November 2005, KTEN began utilizing "TrueView Doppler 10/4" (later renamed "First Alert True View Radar" in 2012), a Doppler radar system that utilizes live VIPIR data from radars operated by National Weather Service radar sites out of Oklahoma City and Frederick, Oklahoma, Fort Worth, Texas and Shreveport, Louisiana for use by station meteorologists for weather segments within its newscasts and for severe weather cut-ins (KTEN does not operate a radar site within proximity to its studios). The radar utilizes a 10-centimetre (3.9 in) radar beam wavelength that, because each of the sites used provides overlapping coverage of the station's viewing area, is less prone to attenuation interference from precipitation located near each of the sites in comparison to shorter wavelength radars.

One month after the subchannel launched as a CW affiliate, on October 25, 2006, KTEN began producing a half-hour prime time newscast at 9 p.m. for KTEN-DT2, under the title Texoma CW News at 9:00. The program—which was the first local prime time news program to debut in the Ada–Sherman market – uses the same anchor staff as that employed for the evening newscasts on KTEN's main channel. Texoma CW News at 9:00 would eventually gain a competitor in September 2009, when CBS affiliate KXII began producing a five-minute-long news and weather segment in that timeslot for its Fox-affiliated DT3 subchannel (which originally aired only on Monday through Friday evenings, before expanding into a half-hour, seven-night-a-week broadcast on August 26, 2011). On July 30, 2008, the station introduced "KTEN Weather Call," a subscription telephone notification service that utilizes the National Weather Service's Storm-Based Warnings to send an automated warning message recorded by KTEN meteorologists—and, if a user prefers to receive it, an email or text message—to the user's address if their location within the warning area.

The station launched additional newscasts for KTEN-DT3 upon its May 9, 2010, conversion into an ABC affiliate. Initially, the subchannel carried simulcasts of the final 90 minutes of its weekday morning newscast and its nightly 5 p.m. newscasts, along with separate weekday late-afternoon and nightly 10 p.m. newscasts produced for KTEN-DT3, under the brand ABC Texoma News (later retitled ABC 10 First News in September 2015); KTEN extended production of the "ABC Texoma" newscasts to include the weekday morning and weekend 5:30 p.m. newscasts. The "ABC Texoma" newscasts are produced from a secondary news set at KTEN's High Point Circle studios, and incorporates national news segments from the ABC News One affiliate video service along with content from CNN Newsource incorporated into newscasts seen on the station's NBC and CW channels. Weekend evening newscasts seen on KTEN-DT1 and KTEN-DT3 can be delayed or preempted on either or both channels in the event that network programming (most commonly, sporting events like ABC Saturday Night Football games that air on KTEN-DT3 during the college football season) overrun into their timeslots. In September 2011, KTEN extended its 5 p.m. newscast to Saturday and Sunday evenings; until that time, weekend news programming on KTEN's main channel was limited to the existing 10 p.m. broadcast. On September 12, 2011, KTEN launched an hour-long newscast at 4 p.m. for KTEN-DT3 (the program was originally slated to air on the station's main signal, before being moved to the ABC subchannel shortly before its debut).

On January 30, 2014, KTEN began broadcasting its local newscasts in high definition, becoming the second and last television station in the Ada-Sherman market to make the upgrade; the 9 p.m. newscast on KTEN-DT2 was not included in the upgrade as the subchannel transmitted in standard definition at the time. With the upgrade, the station also introduced a high-definition-ready set that was originally used by fellow NBC station KXAS-TV in Dallas–Fort Worth from 2010 until that station relocated from its longtime Broadcast Hill facility in Fort Worth to the then-new Studios at DFW in October 2013.

==== Notable former on-air staff ====
- Ralph Baker Jr. – news anchor
- Michael Jenkins – sports anchor
- Julia Morales – reporter
- Whitney Reynolds – reporter

== Technical information ==
=== Subchannels ===
The station's signal is multiplexed:

Subchannels of KTEN
Channel	Res.	Short name	Programming
10.1	1080i	KTENNBC	NBC
10.2	720p	KTEN-CW	The CW Plus
10.3	720p	KTENABC	ABC

=== Analog-to-digital conversion ===
KTEN began low-power test transmissions of its digital television signal in 2002. The station commenced full-power digital broadcasts on a regular basis on July 1, 2006, at which point the station began broadcasting its main feed in high definition over UHF digital channel 26; initially, the only HD programming content offered by KTEN consisted of NBC network programs. Final upgrades to the full-power signal were completed that summer, in preparation for the September launch of its CW-affiliated DT2 subchannel.

KTEN ended regular programming on its analog signal, over VHF channel 10, on June 12, 2009, the official date on which full-power television stations in the United States transitioned from analog to digital broadcasts under federal mandate. The station's digital signal remained on its pre-transition UHF channel 26, using virtual channel 10. The decision to delay KTEN's digital conversion was made to enable viewers that were not prepared for the transition to continue receiving information about severe thunderstorm events affecting the Texoma area during the spring 2009 severe weather season, most notably on February 10, 2009, when the station provided extensive live coverage of an EF4 tornado that killed eight people in Lone Grove. As part of the SAFER Act, KTEN kept its analog signal on the air until June 30 to inform viewers of the digital television transition through a loop of public service announcements from the National Association of Broadcasters.
