= Nick Young (broadcast journalist) =

American broadcast journalist

- Born: Nicholas Yeazel; Princeton, Illinois, U.S.
- Education: University of Missouri
- Occupation: Broadcast journalist
- Employer: CBS News (1990-2010)

Nick Young (born in Princeton, Illinois) is an American broadcast journalist now retired from CBS News. Young is former anchor of the morning CBS World News Roundup on the CBS Radio Network. He was born Nicholas Yeazel.

== Early career ==
Young's broadcast career began in 1968 in his hometown. After his 1971 graduation from the University of Missouri's School of Journalism, Young joined the staff of WLW Radio in Cincinnati, Ohio, hosting an overnight telephone talk show.

In 1975 Young moved to WEEI Radio, Boston, Massachusetts, as a midday anchor. Four years later, he became the morning anchor at Boston's WHDH, partnering with co-host Jess Cain. While at WHDH he was involved along with the staff in award-winning coverage of many important local stories, including a major chemical spill, that was singled out for honors by Sigma Delta Chi, the Society of Professional Journalists.

In the summer of 1983 Young moved to New York City as a correspondent for RKO/United Stations/Unistar Radio Networks. For the next seven years he anchored hourly newscasts and many major events. From 1983 to 1984, he also co-anchored the weekly hour-long Newsweek On Air with David Alpern.

== CBS and journalism career ==
In 1990 Young joined CBS News. During the next twenty years, Young covered many of the day's major stories—the O. J. Simpson trial, the aftermath of the Oklahoma City bombing, Mike Tyson's rape trial, political conventions, national campaigns, the wars in the Persian Gulf, the 9-11 attacks, the funeral of Mother Teresa, and other important assignments. In 2006 he was named successor to World News Roundup anchor Christopher Glenn, who announced his retirement in February. On March 25, 2010, Young announced his retirement from CBS News.

After his departure, he returned to Princeton, Illinois. He worked as a freelance anchor at Chicago's WBBM Newsradio 780 and 105.9 FM from 2010 to 2020 when he retired from radio.

== Art and fiction ==
As an artist, he has had his work exhibited in New York and Illinois.

As a writer, his work has appeared in dozens of reviews, journals and anthologies. His first novel Deadline was published in September 2023.

Young has also narrated nearly two audiobooks.

== Personal life ==
Young lives in Princeton with wife Deborah. Their son, Christopher is also a resident of the city.

== Honors ==
- Sigma Delta Chi Award: Distinguished Service Award
- Society of Professional Journalists: Bronze Medallion
- The Radio Television Digital News Association: Edward R. Murrow Award
