= CBS World News Roundup =

Longest-running network radio newscast in the US

- Genre: News program
- Running time: 10 minutes (8:00 am – 8:10 am)
- Country of origin: United States
- Language: English
- Home station: CBS Radio Network
- Hosted by: Steve Kathan; Jennifer Keiper (Evening Update)
- Written by: Steve Kathan
- Produced by: Paul Farry
- Executive producers: Steve Dorsey; Kevin Rochford
- Recording studio: Studio 57, CBS Broadcast Center, New York City, U.S.
- Original release: March 13, 1938 – May 22, 2026
- No. of episodes: 22,900+
- Audio format: MP3
- Opening theme: "CBS News Theme" by Antfood
- Sponsored by: T-Mobile; Chase Bank; Paramount+; Audacy
- Website: feeds.cbsnews.com/podcast_icast_1
- Podcast: radiohof.org/cbs_world_news_roundup.html

The CBS World News Roundup was the longest-running network radio newscast in the United States, having been on the air for 88 years, from 1938 until 2026.

It first went on-air on March 13, 1938, at 8 p.m. ET as a one-time special in response to growing tensions in Europe—specifically the Anschluss, during which Adolf Hitler invaded Austria. The program's final edition was broadcast on May 22, 2026, CBS News Radio's last day of operation.

== The early years ==
When the show first went on the air, it was hosted by veteran radio personality Robert Trout. The first show gave the world the voices of Edward R. Murrow and William L. Shirer. In fact, it was the first time Murrow had ever delivered a news report. War correspondents, including members of the Murrow Boys, broadcast from around Europe throughout the war.

The program was a 35-minute special report from multiple locations around the world as the pre-war crisis mounted. It was the first time that on-the-scene European field correspondents were linked with a central anchor in New York for a national broadcast.

Most broadcast references credit either CBS President William S. Paley or News Director Paul White as coming up with the idea for the show, as a way to trump Max Jordan's NBC coverage of the Anschluss. The previous day, Shirer had flown from Vienna to London at the request of Murrow to give the first uncensored eyewitness account of Germany's takeover of Austria.

It was White who relayed the order to Murrow and Shirer for the first Roundup. The two, Murrow in Vienna and Shirer in London, then had the responsibility of linking up reporters and circuits that same day, when many of the key people would be mostly unreachable.

The format was so successful that it was repeated the following evening, and then revived later that year during the Sudetenland crisis. Eventually, it evolved into a daily show.

As World War II raged in Europe, the Roundup format spawned a weekend edition, The World Today. It was just before one 2:30 p.m. Eastern broadcast, on December 7, 1941, that White and World Today anchor John Charles Daly received word in New York that the Japanese had attacked Pearl Harbor. Daly's report at the top of the show, among the first on any radio station or network, is the one most often used in audio retrospectives.

== The show's later years ==
Until May 22, 2026, the CBS World News Roundup remained an active part of the CBS Radio Network lineup, making it America's longest running network newscast on radio or TV. The 10-minute newscast aired every morning on CBS Radio affiliates nationwide at 8 a.m. Eastern and 7 a.m. Pacific.

Despite the name of the broadcast, it no longer emphasized world news and often was devoted to the same national, political and lifestyle stories as the shorter top of the hour news broadcasts.

When it left the air, the morning edition of the World News Roundup was anchored by Steve Kathan and produced by Paul Farry. The full show ran for 10 minutes, although many stations took only the first eight minutes.

The longest tenure of one anchor with the Roundup was that of Dallas Townsend, who hosted the morning broadcast for 25 years. Townsend was followed by Reid Collins and then Bill Lynch who anchored from March 25, 1985 until his contract was not renewed in 1999.

Christopher Glenn's long career at CBS was punctuated with a stint on the Roundup from 1999 until 2006.

After Glenn's retirement, Nick Young had a short tenure on the Roundup until he retired in 2010.

Until December 19, 2025, a Late Edition aired at 7 p.m. Eastern time and ran for 9 minutes. Originally titled The World Tonight, the evening show was anchored by Douglas Edwards from 1966 until 1988. After Edwards retired, Glenn settled in as nighttime anchor until 1999, when he moved to the World News Roundup.

Around the same time as Glenn's departure to the flagship morning broadcast, The World Tonight was rebranded as the World News Roundup Late Edition. The late edition was hosted by Bill Whitney and produced by Greg Armstrong. Whitney anchored the program until his departure from CBS in December 2016, a run of 17 years.

From 1966 until 2016, The World Tonight / World News Roundup Late Edition had only three anchors. Since Bill Whitney's retirement in 2016, turnover increased.

Dave Barrett succeeded Whitney until his sudden death on September 19, 2018. Jim Chenevey, the longtime overnight anchor for CBS, moved to daytime and the Late Edition, but was let go in June 2020.

Subsequently, Pam Coulter anchored the broadcast until her departure from CBS in September 2020. Peter King replaced her until April 2021 when Jennifer Keiper became the anchor of the World News Roundup Late Edition. On December 19, 2025, the World News Roundup Late Edition was discontinued.

On March 21, 2026, CBS News editor-in-chief Bari Weiss announced the closure of CBS News Radio effective May 22, 2026, effectively cancelling the series after 88 years.

The final World News Roundup aired May 22, 2026 Anchored by Steve Kathan and Produced by Todd Weiss.

== The Weekend Roundup ==
In 2000, CBS Radio developed a weekly show based on the original Roundup format. The CBS News Weekend Roundup, designed for an hour-long time slot (40 minutes plus slots for commercials and affiliate cut-ins), was produced each Friday and aired on a number of CBS Radio affiliates on Saturdays and Sundays. It included interviews with CBS News correspondents and other newsmakers. The network's then-news director, Mike Freedman, was the creator and first executive producer of the show.

Bill Lynch, former anchor of the morning Roundup, was the first host of the weekend show. It was last anchored by CBS News Correspondent Allison Keyes. The longest tenured anchor of the program was former CBS News National Correspondent Dan Raviv in Washington. Correspondent Howard Arenstein, the Washington radio bureau chief, was also the executive producer. Raviv's last show as host was broadcast on January 20, 2017. After Raviv's departure, the broadcast was anchored by Steve Dorsey until Keyes assumed the role in late 2019. On December 20, 2025, the Weekend Roundup broadcast its final episode.
