= Marion Isabelle Whitney =

American geologist (1911–1998)

- Born: April 23, 1911; Austin, Texas
- Died: September 16, 1998 (aged 87); Mount Pleasant, Michigan
- Occupation(s): Geologist, college professor, writer

Marion Isabelle Whitney (April 23, 1911 – September 16, 1998) was an American geologist, college professor, and writer. She was the first woman to complete doctoral studies in geology at the University of Texas at Austin, in 1937.

== Early life and education ==
Whitney was born and raised in Austin, Texas, the daughter of Francis Luther Whitney and Grace Pellet Whitney. Her father was a paleontology professor. She earned a bachelor's degree in geology from the University of Texas at Austin in 1930, then stayed to complete a master's degree in 1931, with a thesis titled "Fauna of the Glen Rose Formation". In 1937, she became the first woman to earn a Ph.D. from the geology department at Texas.

== Career ==
Whitney was a schoolteacher in Texas in the 1930s. She taught at Kansas State Teachers' College from 1937 to 1942, at Kilgore Junior College from 1942 to 1946, at Texas Christian University from 1946 to 1951, at Arkansas Polytechnic College from 1952, at Louisiana Tech University from 1955, and at Central Michigan University from 1961 to her retirement in 1981. She was head of the geology department at Arkansas Polytechnic College in the 1950s. She gained full professor status in 1971.

== Publications ==
In addition to her academic publications, Whitney wrote a novel for young readers, Juan of Parícutin (1953), based on her travels to see the volcano Parícutin in Michoacán, Mexico. She wrote a second children's book about an opossum she raised.

- "Some Zone Marker Fossils of the Glen Rose Formation of Central Texas" (1952)
- "Some New Pelecypoda from the Glen Rose Formation of Texas" (1952)
- Juan of Parícutin (1953)
- "Echinoids of the Glen Rose Limestone of Texas" (1966, with Lewis Burnett Kellum)

== Personal life ==
Whitney died in 1998, at the age of 87, in Mount Pleasant, Michigan. There is a collection of her papers in the library at Central Michigan University.
