= John Whitney (footballer) =

English footballer

John Whitney (1874–?) was an English footballer. His regular position was at full back. He was born in Lancashire. He played for Manchester United.
