= George Whitney =

George Whitney may refer to:

- George Whitney (rugby league) (fl. 1920s), Welsh rugby player
- George H. Whitney (1863–1928), New York politician
- George S. Whitney (1878–1956), American football coach
- George F. Whitney (1873–1935), American tennis player

== See also ==
- George Whitney Calhoun (1890–1963), sports and telegraph editor; co-founder of the Green Bay Packers
