= William M. Whitney =

American politician

Member of the Illinois House of Representatives from the 82nd district
- In office 1870 – 1872

Personal details
- Born: September 23, 1828 Ontario, New York
- Party: Republican
- Profession: Real estate

William M. Whitney (1828 – in or after 1908) was an American politician and real estate developer from upstate New York. In Illinois, he served as DuPage County Circuit Clerk and Recorder for eight years. Whitney was elected to the Illinois House of Representatives in 1870 and served one two-year term. In 1873, he led the effort to incorporate Hinsdale, Illinois.

== Biography ==
William M. Whitney was born in Ontario, New York on September 23, 1828. He became a teacher in 1848 and married Sarah Lavilla Clark in 1851. Whitney came to Winfield, Illinois in 1858. Two years later, he was elected DuPage County Circuit Clerk and Recorder. He served in this role until 1868. Whitney moved to Naperville, then the DuPage County seat, in 1862. Six years later, the seat was moved to Wheaton, which may have caused Whitney to not seek re-election in his role. He was admitted to the bar in 1868, but never practiced law.

Starting in 1865, Whitney became involved with real estate dealings. In 1868, he platted one of the first subdivisions in Downers Grove with Charles W. Richmond. By 1870, Whtiney was worth $17,000. In 1870, Whitney was elected to the Illinois House of Representatives as the only representation from DuPage County. He served in the 27th General Assembly. After his term expired, Whitney returned to his home in Hinsdale, where he pushed for incorporation. Whitney's petition was approved on March 29, 1873. From 1872 to 1876, Whitney was a member of the State Board of Equalization, a tax assessment board.

The Panic of 1873 ruined Whitney financially. By 1879, Whitney was deeply in debt and sold his house to pay back taxes. Whitney served as Hinsdale's police magistrate from 1878 to 1880. In 1879, he took a position managing accounts for the Illinois Eastern Hospital for the Insane, where he worked for eight years. Sarah Whitney died in 1880. His daughter Annie became a prominent doctor in Batavia. In 1904, Whitney was living in Lake Geneva, Wisconsin. By 1908, Whitney had retired to Evanston and cared for a small apiary.

Whitney's role in incorporating Hinsdale was rediscovered during the village centennial in 1973. On October 19, 1989, his Hinsdale house was recognized by the National Park Service with a listing on the National Register of Historic Places.
