= Thomas Whitney =

Thomas Whitney may refer to:

- Thomas Whitney (computing) (died 1986), involved in invention of pocket calculator
- Thomas P. Whitney (1917–2007), American diplomat, author and racehorse owner/breeder
- Thomas R. Whitney (1807–1858), politician from New York
- Tom Whitney (born 1989), golfer

== See also ==
- Thomas Witney (fl. 1292–1342), English master mason
- Tommaso Ciampa (born 1985), wrestler born Tommasso Whitney
