= Whitney Reynolds =

American television talk show host and writer (born 1986)

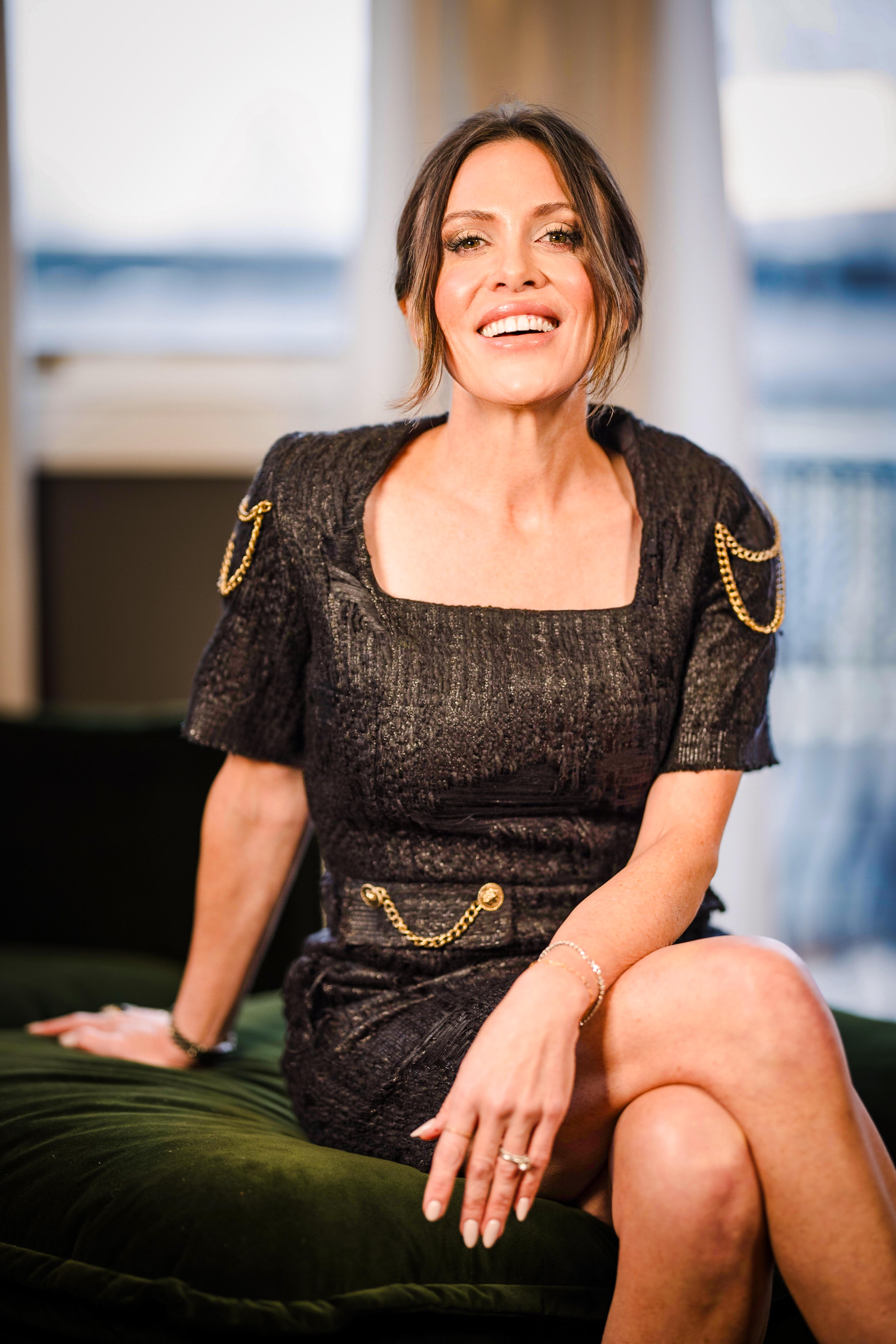
- Reynolds photo shoot, 2026
- Born: Durant, Oklahoma, U.S.
- Education: Baylor University
- Occupations: Television host; executive producer
- Notable work: The Whitney Reynolds Show
- Spouse: David Heiner (married 2013–present)
- Children: Marlowe and Acher Heiner
- Website: whitneyreynolds.com

Whitney Reynolds is an American television talk show host who presents the Whitney Reynolds Show, a nationally syndicated topic-based talk show that airs on PBS stations across the United States as well as via providers such as Amazon, Tubi, YouTube and Roku. She is also a podcast host, author, and executive producer.

== Early life and education ==
Originally from Durant, Oklahoma, Reynolds attended Durant High School. She has a degree in communications from Baylor University. One of the staff there described her as "one of the most driven students I think I have ever been around."

== Early television career ==
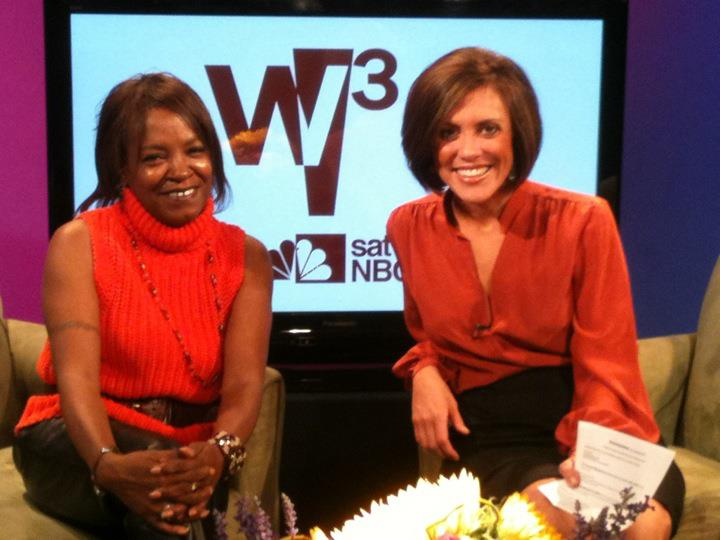
Reynolds interviewing for the Weekends with Whitney.

Reynolds's career started with an internship with Good Morning America, where she moved to New York three years after her college graduation. During her internship, she worked in research, assisted in the studio, and entertained audiences when needed.

After completing her internship, Reynolds joined KTEN News, an NBC affiliate near Dallas, Texas, in 2008 as a reporter and producer. Within three months, she was promoted to anchor their morning news show, which soon expanded from 1.5 to 2 hours daily.

Reynolds relocated to Chicago and briefly worked at Nine West while seeking roles in media. She soon joined WREX-TV in Rockford, Illinois, where she filmed, edited, and reported daily news stories. During this period, Reynolds launched her own online talk show featuring interviews with everyday people. The show's originality attracted NBC Chicago's attention and led to Weekends with Whitney (2009 - 2011), a lifestyle segment exploring Chicago's dining scene, wine culture, and adventures like skydiving. This early format laid the foundation for what would become The Whitney Reynolds Show.

== The Whitney Reynolds Show ==
Her talk show, The Whitney Reynolds Show, discusses a single topic from multiple perspectives. Topics include, but are not limited to: military veterans, illnesses and stories of hope. It was first on NBC, and in 2012, Reynolds moved to the PBS Network to broadcast on Chicago's Lakeshore PBS. The Quad Cities' WQPT and Peoria's WTVP

The show expanded its market on July 7, 2019, with the addition of WILL Champaign-Urbana. Its staff and their roles also changed in 2019. As of January 2021, the show expanded to be offered to PBS stations nationwide through the National Educational Telecommunications Association distribution service.

As of 2025, The Whitney Reynolds Show is recorded at CineCity Studios in Chicago in front of a live audience. Guests have included Zara Larsson, Michael Phelps, Rebel Wilson, Magic Johnson, & Temple Grandin.

== X-Overs (Crossovers) ==
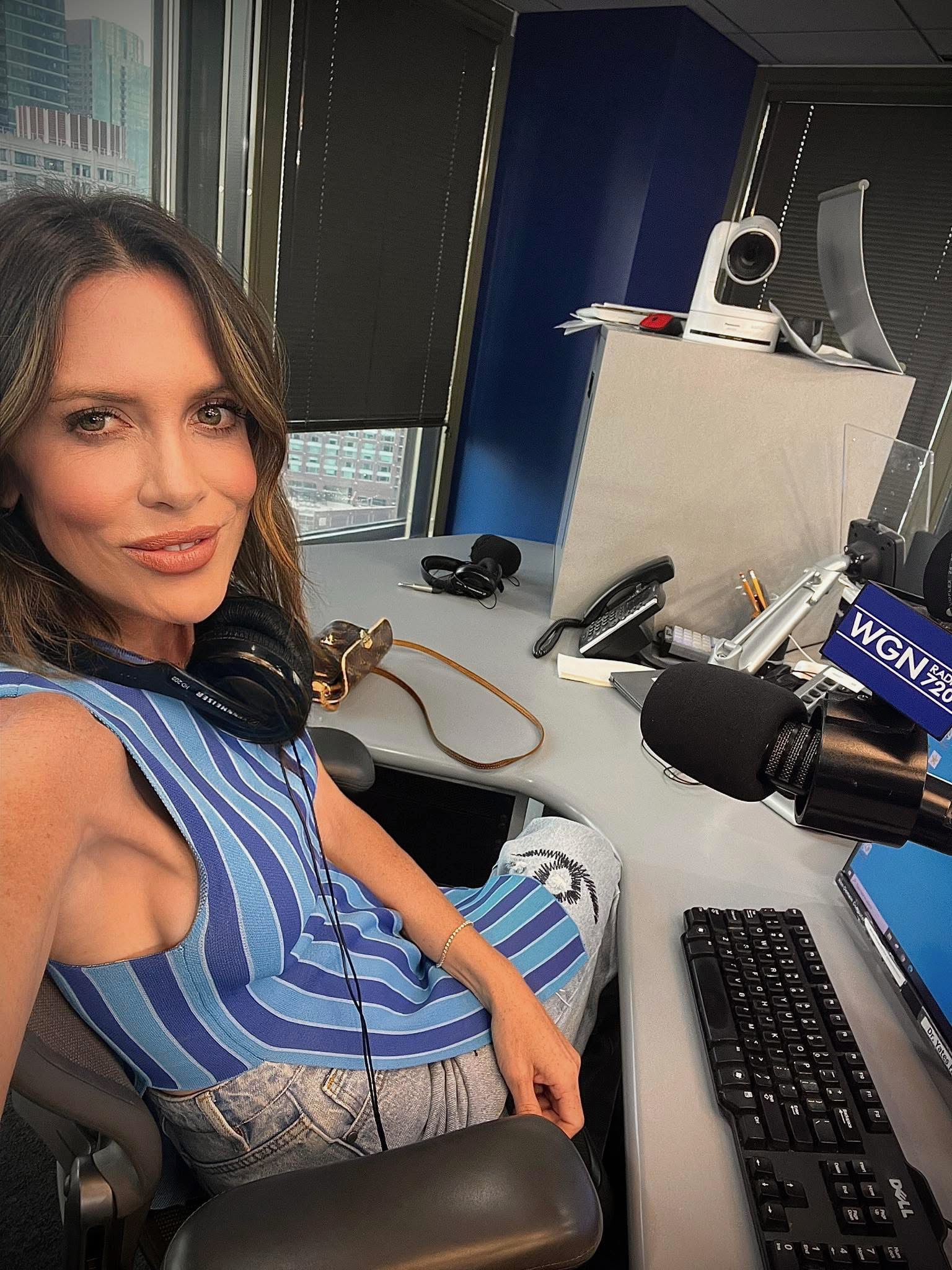
Reynolds visiting WGN

Reynolds' content is expanded over multiple different mediums and platforms as "X-Overs" (pronounced crossovers) to help promote her messages, "tailored to how viewers, listeners, and streamers want to experience them." Her goal is to make her content accessible in many mediums and to become "the strongest voice of hope".

"The Whitney WRap"

A self-hosted program that delves further into the stories of guests featured on The Whitney Reynold Show, stylized as "The Whitney WRap" or her initials. The program is featured in various formats for audiences:

- Podcast: "The Whitney WRap" is featured as a podcast on services such as Spotify and iHeart
- Streaming: "The Whitney WRap" is available both online via YouTube and PBS.

WGN Radio

Starting in 2024, “Wednesdays with Whit” on WGN Radio 720 features Whitney Reynolds with host John Landecker as they discuss what will be featured on her main program The Whitney Reynolds Show.

iHeartRadio

Reynolds is the founder and executive of the radio segment Whitney's Women which airs on "The Weekly Show" on 103.5 KISS FM, 95.5 BIG, 93.9 MYfm and iHeart Radio. In 2016, she started a column for Whitney's Women in Chicago Woman Magazine which features Chicago women that give back to the community.

Who's with Whit

Reynolds is a monthly contributor to Fete Lifestyle Magazine, where she writes "Who's with Whit," an interview series featuring conversations with business leaders, entertainers, nonprofit advocates, and community figures. The column highlights personal stories, professional achievements, and the impact of individuals across the Chicago area.

== Hosting and appearances ==
On September 18, 2022, Reynolds hosted the 54th Annual Public Media Awards. The Public Media Awards Gala was presented by the National Educational Telecommunications Association honoring the achievements of public media.

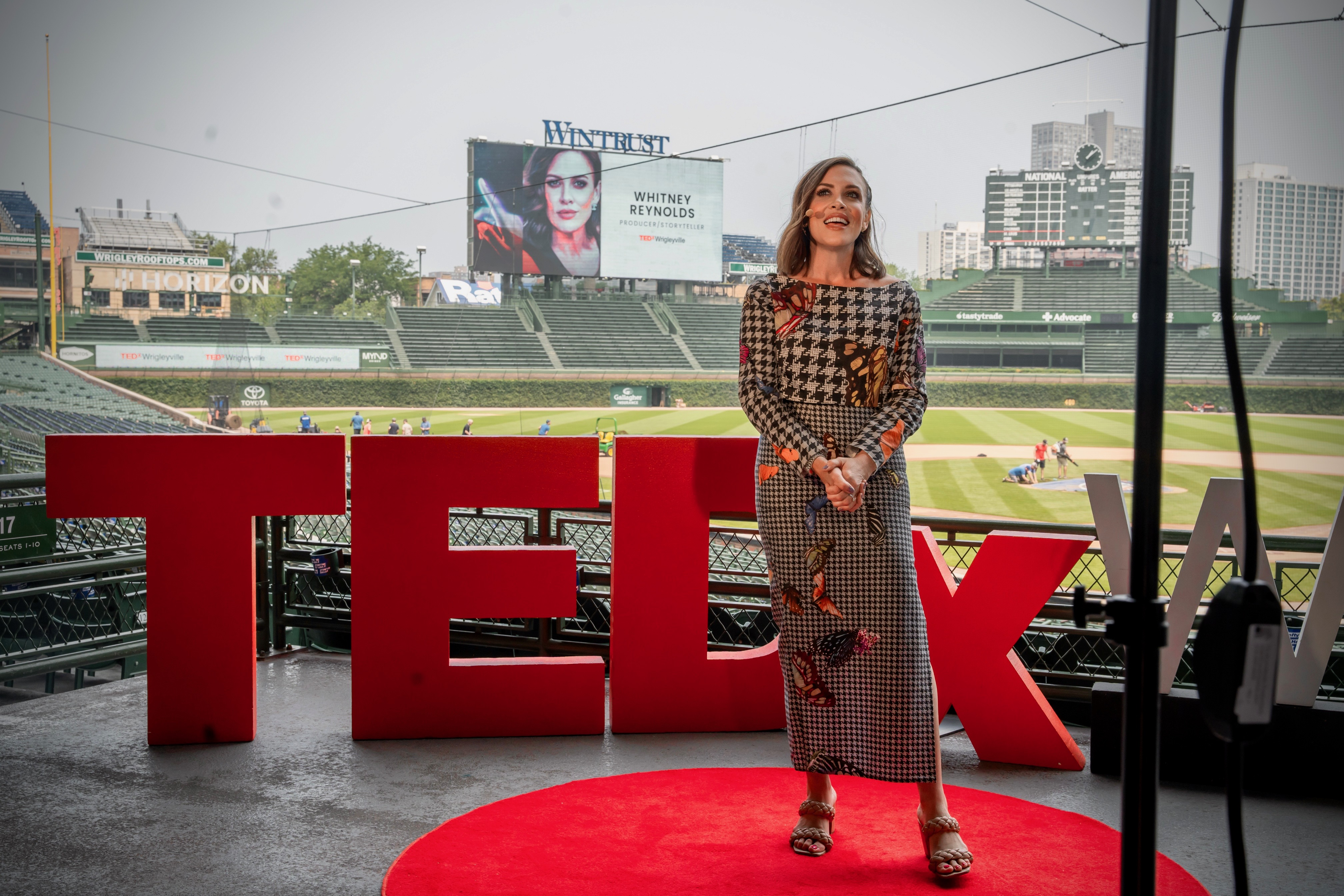
Whitney Reynolds giving a TEDx talk at the TEDxWrigleyville event at Wrigley Field

Reynolds was guest speaker for the 2022 Women of Influence event put on by Peoria Magazine. The event was held on December 6, 2022, in Peoria, Illinois.

In December 2022, Whitney was a featured guest on Daytime Chicago for the WGN Holiday Special discussing "Whitney's Wish List: The 2024 Curated Holiday Gift Guide”.

In 2023, Reynolds hosted her first TEDx talk that was independently organized by the Chicago community for the TEDxWrigleyville event, held at Wrigley Field in the North Side of Chicago, Illinois. The talk was titled, "HOPE: A New Acronym for Ethic"l Storytelling."

== Philanthropy ==
In 2019, Reynolds received the Humanitarian Inspiration Award for We Dream in Color, a charity that collaborates with multiple organizations to support fundraising efforts for important causes. Also that year, she was the keynote speaker for the 2019 Legacy and Legends gathering for members of the Five Junior League.

Reynolds has served on the board of Dress for Success and has supported several nonprofit organizations throughout the Chicago area, including the March of Dimes, The Service Club of Chicago, The Chicago Lighthouse, WINGS Program, and the Economic Club of Chicago.

In 2022, Reynolds attended the 45th anniversary of the Ronald McDonald House Charities of Chicagoland & Northwest Indiana gala to support access to arts education by providing tuition-free arts training programs for current, future, and former students at the Chicago High School for the Arts. The event successfully raised over $1.3 million for nearly 14,000 Chicagoland families.

Reynolds was a featured co-chair and active member of the Service Club of Chicago in 2023, helping to host the annual Spring Hat Luncheon, and the Economic Club of Chicago. This event raised funds for the nonprofit's grant program, which provides grants to charities focused on expanding facilities, upgrading equipment, and launching new community programs.

Reynolds has served as a keynote speaker for events hosted by Baylor University and the Highland Park Country Club, speaking on topics including resilience, storytelling, and community engagement. Through her work with The Service Club of Chicago, Reynolds has helped raise more than $250,000 for the organization's charitable initiatives.

== Awards and honors ==
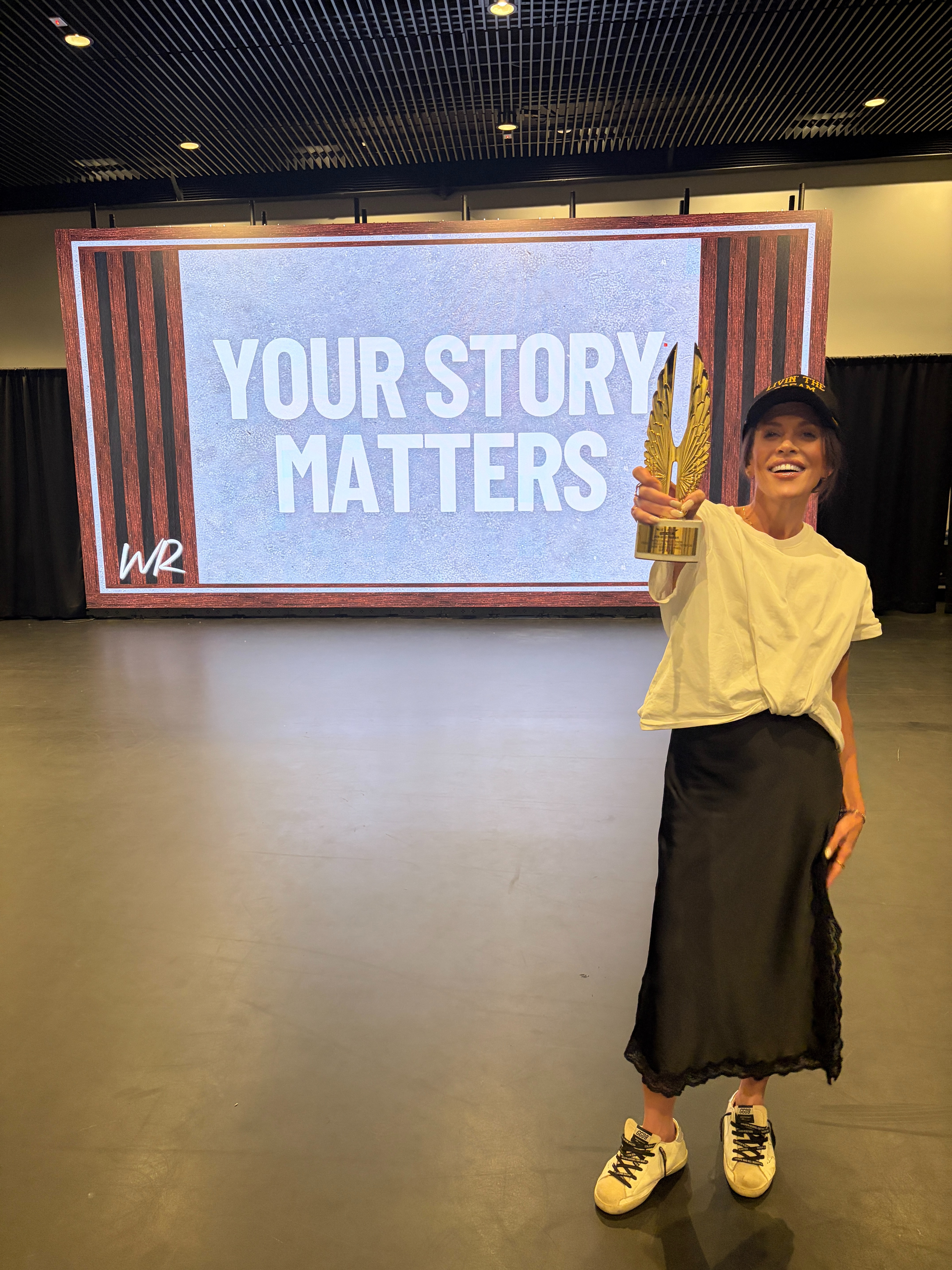
Whitney Reynolds holding her 2026 Hermes Creative Award for "Seeds of Change" from Season 10 of The Whitney Reynolds Show.

Reynolds award recognition includes: Multiple Emmy Award nominations, Crain's Chicago Business 40 Under 40, Baylor University Top 15 in the Arts, Female of the Year (FAHF), Five Telly Awards, and a Viddy Award (2025) for the original theme song of The Whitney Reynolds Show. She has also received recognition from organizations including the Hermes Creative Awards and has presented at the Chicago/Midwest Emmy Awards.

Recently Whitney Reynolds received a Hermes Creative Award as Executive Producer for "Seeds of Change", an episode from Season 10 of The Whitney Reynolds Show. The recognition highlighted Reynolds’ work in purpose-driven storytelling and marked a notable achievement as an independent entrepreneur and producer competing alongside major brands, agencies, and corporate media teams. The award further reflected the show's continued impact and Reynolds’ role in developing meaningful, socially focused content. Along with the Hermes Creative Award, Whitney has been named in CS Magazine's 2026 Best-Dressed Chicagoans with her being a Roscoe Village resident.

In 2015, The Whitney Reynolds Show was nominated for an Emmy in the category: Outstanding Interview and Discussion Special Programming, for her show "Veterans".

In 2018, Reynolds was recognized as a Humanitarian Honoree at the FAHF Awards and Female Leader of The Year at the "I'm Possible Conference" for the contributions her show gives to society.

In November 2019, she won a Bronze Stevie Award for Video of the Year for the episode titled “Self Image.”

On May 27, 2020, her show earned a Bronze Telly Award for the episode “Overcoming Racism,” which focused on racial issues in the United States.

During the 2022 award season, The Whitney Reynolds Show won a Gold People's Telly Award in the General Regional TV category for the episode “Survivors” and a Bronze Telly Award in the Television General Public Interest/Awareness category for the episode “Did You Know.”

Whitney Reynolds throws the ceremonial first pitch at Wrigley Field in Chicago on September 3, 2026.

In 2023, Reynolds earned her first Emmy nomination as an executive producer for Outstanding Achievement in Public Service Announcement - Single Spot/Campaign for the PSA, “The Healing Circle and the Effect.” That same year, the show won a Bronze Stevie Award for Achievement in Equal Pay, highlighting its role in advocating for pay equity. Additionally, Reynolds was named to Crain's Chicago 40 Under 40 list, recognizing her contributions to the entertainment industry.

In September 2026, Reynolds threw the ceremonial first pitch at Wrigley Field ahead of a Chicago Cubs game, marking the lead-up to the twelfth season of The Whitney Reynolds Show. The program's twelfth season premiered on Lakeshore PBS on October 19, 2026, and continued its national public television distribution.

== Personal life ==
Reynolds met her husband, David Heiner the day before Reynolds pitched her show to PBS. The couple dated for less than six months and they were engaged. On November 2, 2013, Reynolds and Heiner, married, broadcasting the event in a locally aired, two-hour television special, "I Do, Chicago Style!"

In 2016, Reynolds gave birth to twins, Marlow and Acher. Reynolds and her family currently reside in Chicago. Reynolds and her family have been featured in national campaigns over the years. Her twins have worked with brands such as Gerber, VTech, Mazda, and Sundance Spa.

Reynolds has said that her childhood experiences and family life have shaped both her philanthropic work and her approach to storytelling. She has stated that she founded Whitney Reynolds Media and developed The Whitney Reynolds Show to create the kind of supportive, hope-centered platform that she believes would have benefited her family, while also providing a space for individuals whose stories and perspectives are often underrepresented. These experiences have also influenced her involvement with nonprofit organizations supporting children and families.
