= Arthur Whitney =

Arthur Whitney may refer to:

- Arthur Whitney (computer scientist), Canadian computer scientist, developer of the K programming language
- Arthur Whitney (politician) (1871–1942), Republican nominee for governor of New Jersey in 1925
