= Robert Whitney =

Robert Whitney may refer to:

- Robert Whitney (conductor) (1904–1986), American conductor
- Robert A. Whitney (born 1935), American veterinarian and acting Surgeon General
- Robert Kenneth Whitney (1898–1983), Canadian First World War flying ace
- Robert Whitney (MP for Thetford), English Member of Parliament (MP) for Thetford, 1584
- Robert Whitney (died 1402), English MP for Herefordshire, 1377 to 1391
- Robert Whitney (died 1443), English MP for Herefordshire, 1416, 1422
- Robert Whitney (died 1567), English MP for Herefordshire, 1559

== See also ==
- Bob Whitney (disambiguation)
