= Ray Whitney =

Ray Whitney may refer to:

- Ray Whitney (politician) (1930–2012), British politician
- Ray Whitney (ice hockey) (born 1972), ice hockey forward
