= Richard Whitney =

Richard Whitney may refer to:

- Richard Whitney (financier) (1888–1974), American financier, president of the New York Stock Exchange, convicted embezzler
- Richard Whitney (artist) (born 1946), American portrait and landscape artist
