= James Amaziah Whitney =

American poet

James Amaziah Whitney (30 June 1839 – 1907) was an American lawyer and writer.

== Biography ==
He was the son of Amaziah (22 July 1813 – 7 August 1853) and Margaret S. (née Taylor; 27 December 1818 – 29 March 1895) Whitney. In childhood, he moved with his parents to Maryland, New York, where he received a common-school education, and began his career as a farmer. In 1860, he began studying chemistry, mechanics, and engineering on his own.

In 1865, Whitney became a writer of specifications in the office of a firm of patent lawyers. Then in 1868 he became an editor of the American Artisan, and took an active part in organizing the New York Society of Practical Engineers, of which he was president for several years. From 1869 to 1872, he was professor of agricultural chemistry in the American Institute, and then he started a legal practice as a patent lawyer. In 1876 he was admitted to practice in the U. S. circuit courts. Iowa College gave him the degree of LL.D. in 1880.

== Works ==
Besides numerous essays on scientific, mechanical, legal, and political subjects, Whitney wrote:

- The Relations of the Patent Laws to the Development of Agriculture, a monograph (New York, 1874)
- The Chinese and the Chinese Question (1880; enlarged ed., 1888) This work argued for the exclusion of the Chinese.
- Notes of Travel in Western Europe
- Shobab, a Tale of Bethesda, a poem (1884)
- Sonnets and Lyrics (1884)
- The Children of Lamech, a poem (1885)
- Poetical Works (2 vols., 1886)
