= Bill Whitney =

Willard "Bill" Whitney is an American broadcast journalist. He is best known for his work as an anchor and correspondent for the CBS Radio Network, where he hosted the evening edition of the World News Roundup.

== Early career ==
Before joining CBS News, Whitney, who began his career in broadcasting at the age of 17, worked his way up through the ranks at a variety of local radio stations including WKEN in Dover, Delaware; WGSM in Huntington, New York; WLIX in Islip, New York; and WGBB in Freeport, New York.

From 1979 to 1982, Whitney worked as anchor/news director at WCBS-FM in New York City. He began his employ with the national CBS Radio unit in the early 1980s as one of the original anchors for CBS' young-adult oriented news service, RadioRadio.

== CBS News ==
Whitney moved full-time to the main CBS Radio Network in 1984. During that time he filled in for Charles Osgood on The Osgood File and did commentaries under the Sidebar title. He covered a number of major news stories, including Pope John Paul II's U.S. tour and the Balkan peace talks in Dayton, Ohio which led to the Dayton Accord.

Whitney anchored the CBS World News Roundup - Late Edition as well as hourly news broadcasts throughout the day. He also served as a substitute anchor for the morning edition of the Roundup.

Whitney did his final broadcast for CBS on December 1, 2016. A number of executives and on-air personnel (including Whitney) had taken buyouts in the face of a wave of layoffs.

== Personal life ==
Whitney lives in Wyckoff, New Jersey with his wife Peg and glorious Labrador, Ernie. The Whitneys have four daughters: Maggie, Alice, Grace and Mary.

== Honors ==
- Edward R. Murrow Award: (2000) For Best Network Newscast
- Edward R. Murrow Award: (2001) For Best Writing
