= List of Peabody Award winners (1970–1979) =

The following is a list of George Foster Peabody Award winners and honorable mentions from the decade of the 1970s (1970–1979).

== 1970 ==
Recipient	Area of Excellence
ABC News	Eye of the Storm
BBC Television	Civilisation
CBS	Award for the Dr. Seuss animated programs, including Horton Hears a Who! and The Cat in the Hat
CBS	The Selling of The Pentagon (Roger Mudd, correspondent)
CBS News	60 Minutes
NBC	The Flip Wilson Show
NBC	Hot Dog
NBC News	Migrant: An NBC White Paper (presented by Chet Huntley)
NBC Radio	The Danger Within: A Study of Disunity in America, a documentary narrated by Bill Ryan with a discussion hosted by Frank McGee
NBC Radio and Douglas Kiker	Award for Kiker's reports from Jordan
Voice of America and Garry Moore	Personal Award for VOA's presentation of news and public affairs programming, in particular Moore's New York, New York
John E. Drewry	Personal Award to the Dean of the Henry W. Grady School of Journalism from 1940 to in 1969 for his role in the foundation and administration of the Peabody Awards
PBS	Evening at Pops
KCET-TV/Los Angeles, CA and PBS	The Andersonville Trial
KMEX-TV/Los Angeles, CA	Peace... On Our Time: KMEX-TV and the Death of Rubén Salazar, highlighting the work of station manager Danny Villanueva
WAHT/Annville-Cleona (Lebanon), PA	Award for the series Medical Viewpoint and the documentary Pearl Harbor, Lest We Forget, highlighting the work of Fred Williams
WFBE/Flint, MI	Listening/4, a series designed to teach listening skills to Flint area school students
WPBT-TV/Miami, FL	Polithon '70, a statewide radio/TV broadcast featuring candidates for statewide public office (Jerome Schnur, executive producer)
WWL-TV/New Orleans, LA	This New Frontier, a documentary profiling the nation of Israel (Phil Johnson, news director)

== 1971 ==
Recipient	Area of Excellence
ABC	Make a Wish
ABC and William Blinn	Brian's Song
Mississippi State Educational Television Authority	Institutional Award for its efforts "to expand and modernize school curricula, to accelerate learning, and to equalize education in every classroom of the state."
NBC	This Child is Rated X, an NBC White Paper documentary which examined "gross inequities" of juvenile facilities in the United States (Edwin Newman, correspondent)
NBC	Institutional Award for the network's dramatic programming, in particular All the Way Home, Jane Eyre, The Price, and The Snow Goose
NBC Radio	Second Sunday, with programs on "world attitudes toward our country" and the "problems of the aged"
John Rich	Personal Award for his work as Far East correspondent for NBC News
George Heinemann	Personal Award for his work on "entertaining and constructive" children's programming for NBC, such as the NBC Children's Theatre, Take a Giant Step, and Watch Your Child/The Me Too Show
Voice of America	Institutional Award for VOA's "Promotion of International Understanding", with productions including USA Seventy-One and Studio One: The Biography of a Movie
WWVA/Wheeling, WV	Junior Town Meeting of the Air
WHA/Madison, WI	Wisconsin on the Move
Dr. Frank Stanton	Personal Award to the CBS president for his protection of journalistic freedom in the face of political scrutiny
CBS	The American Revolution: 1770-1783, A Conversation with Lord North, Eric Sevareid interviewed Lord North, played by Peter Ustinov
WCCO/Minneapolis, MN	The Heart of the Matter, University of Minnesota Dean E. W. Ziebarth's recounting of his open-heart surgery
WQED-TV/Pittsburgh, PA	The Turned On Crisis, produced by Rhea G. Sikes and Charlotte Woodside
United Nations Television	United Nations Day Concert with Pablo Casals (parts one and two)
Arthur Godfrey	Personal Award for his "innovative programming... uniformly characterized by high quality, wholesome entertainment"

== 1972 ==
Recipient	Area of Excellence
ABC	ABC Afterschool Specials (including Last of the Curlews and Santiago's Ark)
ABC Sports	Award for coverage of the Games of the XX Olympiad
National Public Radio	All Things Considered
Westinghouse Broadcasting Company	Breakdown, a radio series investigating "the critical deterioration of various systems that are an important part in the life of every American"
CBS	Captain Kangaroo
CBS	The Waltons
WWL-TV/New Orleans, LA	China '72: A Hole in the Bamboo Curtain, citing the work of Phil Johnson
KOAC/Corvallis, OR	Conversations with Will Shakespeare and Certain of His Friends
Broadcasting Foundation of America	Institutional Award for its "promotion of international understanding" through distribution of various radio programs and specials
Voice of America	Institutional Award for its coverage of the 1972 U.S. political campaigns
WHRO-TV/Hampton-Norfolk, VA	Institutional Award for the station's educational programming
NBC	Award for the TV specials Jack Lemmon in 'S Wonderful, 'S Marvelous, 'S Gershwin, Liza with a Z, and The Timex All-star Swing Festival
NBC	Pensions, The Broken Promise, an NBC Reports investigation that exposed failings in privately administered group pension systems (produced by David Schmerler and narrated by Edwin Newman)
NBC Radio	Monitor
NBC and its owned and operated stations	Award for the radio documentaries No Fault Insurance - Right or Wrong? and Second Sunday: A Seven-part Series on the Cities
NBC, BBC, and Time-Life Films	The Search for the Nile
WNET/New York, NY and BBC	The Restless Earth, a film on plate tectonics scripted by Nigel Calder and narrated by David S. Prowitt
KGW Radio/Portland, OR	Open Door, a program produced by high school students
Alistair Cooke	Personal Award for his work in America: A Personal View by Alistair Cooke
Bill Monroe	Personal Award for Monroe's interview work at NBC News
District of Columbia Schools Radio Project	The Noise Shows
WABC-TV/New York, NY	Willowbrook: The Last Great Disgrace, an investigative report by Geraldo Rivera examining successes and failures of care for residents with mental disabilities at Willowbrook State School

== 1973 ==
Recipient	Area of Excellence
ABC, CBS, and NBC	Jointly awarded to the TV networks for their "outstanding contributions to entertainment through an exceptional year of televised drama": ABC Theater: The Glass Menagerie and Pueblo, CBS Playhouse 90's Catholics (ITV Sunday Night Theatre) and NBC's The Red Pony
NBC	The Energy Crisis: An American White Paper, reported by Frank McGee and produced by Fred Freed
NBC	Institutional Award for Hallmark Hall of Fame: The Borrowers and NBC Children's Theatre: Street of the Flower Boxes
NBC Radio	Project 1 Experiment, for its Live in Concert presentations of The Carpenters and Helen Reddy
NBC Radio	Second Sunday, for the reports "Communism in the 70s" and "A Right to Death"
ABC News	Close-Up, under the leadership of Av Westin, citing in particular the episodes "Fire!" and "West Virginia: Life, Liberty, and the Pursuit of Coal"
ABC News	The First and Essential Freedom, narrated by Frank Reynolds and Sam Donaldson
WFMT/Chicago, IL	Award for the series Music in Chicago and its broadcasts from the Lyric Opera of Chicago
WIND/Chicago, IL	From 18th Street: Destination Peking
WRC-TV/Washington, DC	Award for WRC's "Home Rule" editorial campaign, which promoted self-government in the District of Columbia
KNXT/Los Angeles, CA	Institutional Award for the children's educational programs Learning Can Be Fun and Dusty's Treehouse
KNOW/Austin, TX	Marijuana and the Law, a series of documentaries and editorials "to separate facts about marijuana from fiction," produced by Wendell Wise Mayes Jr.
WTIU/Bloomington, IN	Myshkin
WCAU-TV/Philadelphia, PA	Overture to Friendship: The Philadelphia Orchestra in China
Joe Garagiola	Personal Award for his work on NBC's The Baseball World of Joe Garagiola
Lowell Thomas	Personal Award "in recognition of his incredible 43 years of continuous daily broadcasts on CBS"
Pamela Ilott	Personal Award to the Director of Religious & Cultural Broadcasting at CBS News for her work on Lamp Unto My Feet and Look Up and Live
Peter Lisagor	Personal Award to the Chicago Daily News Washington Bureau chief for his analysis/commentary work on radio and TV
KANU/Lawrence, KS and the University of Kansas	The American Past

== 1974 ==
Recipient	Area of Excellence
WMAL/Washington, DC	Battles Just Begun, a look at problems facing returning Vietnam War veterans
CBS	Benjamin Franklin
CBS Radio	CBS Radio Mystery Theater
The Johnson Foundation	Conversations from Wingspread, a radio series
ABC	Free to Be... You and Me
ABC	Sadat: Action Biography, produced by Av Westin and highlighting the interviews by Peter Jennings
WCCO-TV/Minneapolis, MN	From Belfast with Love, a documentary profiling the strife in Northern Ireland
NBC	Go
NBC	Tornado! 4:40PM, Xenia, Ohio
NBC	Institutional Award for the network's presentations of The Execution of Private Slovik, The Law, and IBM Presents Clarence Darrow
NBC Radio	Second Sunday
KING-TV/Seattle, WA	How Come?
National Public Affairs Center for Television	Institutional Award for NPACT's "outstanding overall effort to bring meaningful public affairs programming to the nation"
WCKT-TV/Miami, FL	Institutional Award for "a superb series of investigative reports which brought considerable response and change" led by news director Gene Strul
WSB/Atlanta, GA	Institutional Award for Suffer the Little Children, Atlanta: A Portrait in Black and White, and Henry Aaron: A Man with a Mission
WGBH-TV/Boston, MA	NOVA
Carl Stern	Separate Personal Awards to the legal correspondents (Stern with NBC News, Graham with CBS News)
Fred P. Graham	Separate Personal Awards to the legal correspondents (Stern with NBC News, Graham with CBS News)
Julian Goodman	Personal Award to the CEO of NBC "for his long years of dedicated service to the broadcasting industry"
Marilyn Baker	Personal Award to the KQED-TV/San Francisco, CA reporter for her investigative work in areas such as "Chinatown youth gangs, police corruption, phony charity promotions [and] SLA-Patricia Hearst
WNBC/New York, NY	Pledge a Job, a 5-day campaign "to blunt the impact of an unemployment crisis" in the New York City area
KTW/Seattle, WA	The Hit and Run Players, a series of satirical comedy vignettes
KPRC-TV/Houston, TX	The Right Man, a documentary profiling Dr. Robert Hayes' efforts to save Wiley College
WNET-TV/Washington, DC and PBS	Theatre in America
KFAC/Los Angeles, CA	Through the Looking Glass, a youth and arts radio show hosted by Leonora Schildkraut

== 1975 ==
Recipient	Area of Excellence
WCBS/New York, NY	A Life to Share, an initiative aimed at educating parents in special areas of child development
WWL-TV/New Orleans, LA	Jim Metcalf, A Sunday Journal
ABC Television	ABC Afterschool Special
ABC Television	ABC Theater, for Love Among the Ruins
Alphaventure	Big Blue Marble
Westinghouse Broadcasting Company, Inc. (Group W)	Call It Macaroni
KDKB/Mesa, AZ	Institutional Award for the station's "superior overall public service programming"
The Standard School Broadcast	Institutional Award for the school's "educational radio service to citizens of the Far West"
WCKT-TV/Miami, FL	Institutional Award for the station's "envious record of outstanding investigative reporting"
WCVB-TV/Boston, MA	Institutional Award for overall programming excellence
WGMS and WGMS-FM/Bethesda, MD	Institutional Award for the stations' "overall efforts to provide outstanding radio entertainment," citing in particular The Collector's Shelf and 200 Years of Music in America
WMAL/Washington, DC	Institutional Award for radio documentary excellence, citing in particular Suffer the Little Children (profiles of sexually abused children) and The Legend of the Bermuda Triangle
WTOP-TV/Washington, DC	Institutional Award "for overall public service effort," citing the Harambee episode "For My People" (review of minority hiring at the Washington Post) and the Everywoman episode "The Hidden World" (a medical look inside a woman's body)
WAPA-TV/San Juan, PR	Las Rosas Blancas
CBS	M*A*S*H
CBS News	Mr. Rooney Goes to Washington
CBS News	The American Assassins, a profile of speculations into the assassination of John F. Kennedy (Dan Rather, correspondent)
Charles Kuralt	Personal Award to the CBS News correspondent for On the Road to '76
Dr. James R. Killian	Personal Award for Dr. Killian's 25 years of "unflagging, steadfast devotion" to public broadcasting
Jim Laurie	Personal Award to the NBC News correspondent for his dedicated reporting on the fall of Saigon
KMOX/St Louis, MO	"Sleeping Watchdogs," an investigation into government agencies broad consumer protection efforts
Kaiser Broadcasting	Snipets
Voice of America	"The Battle of Lexington," an episode of Two Hundred Years Ago Tonight
KABC-TV/Los Angeles, CA	"The Dale Car: A Dream or a Nightmare?" an investigation by Dick Carlson that revealed a confidence scheme involving the construction of the Twentieth Century Motor Car Corporation vehicle
WSOU-FM/South Orange, NJ	The Land of Poetry
NBC	Weekend
WFMT/Chicago, IL	Music in Chicago: Stravinsky '75, a series on Igor Stravinsky hosted by Chicago Sun-Times critic Robert C. Marsh and Chicago Daily News critic Karen Monson

== 1976 ==
Recipient	Area of Excellence
ABC	Animals, Animals, Animals
ABC	Eleanor and Franklin
ABC News	Suddenly an Eagle, a documentary about the lead-up to the Revolutionary War narrated by Lee J. Cobb and Kenneth Griffith and produced by William Peters
ABC Sports	Award for coverage of the 1976 Winter and Summer Olympic Games
Jim Karayn and the League of Women Voters	Award for organization of the 1976 presidential debates
CBS News	60 Minutes
CBS News	In Celebration of US, the network's coverage of Bicentennial events across the United States on July 4th
CBS News	In the News
WETA-TV/Washington, DC	In Performance at Wolf Trap
WETA-TV/Washington, DC, WNET/New York, NY, and Bill Moyers	"A Conversation with Jimmy Carter," an episode of U.S.A.: People and Politics
WNET/New York, NY	The Adams Chronicles
KERA-TV/Dallas, TX	A Thirst in the Garden, a documentary examining lack of potable water in the lower Rio Grande Valley
South Carolina Educational Radio Network	American Popular Song with Alec Wilder and Friends (with Alec Wilder)
WGIR AM & FM/Manchester, NH	Flashback 1976
Tomorrow Entertainment, Inc.	Judge Horton and the Scottsboro Boys (a television movie about the Scottsboro Boys directed by Fielder Cook that aired on NBC)
Charles Barthold	Personal Award to the WHO-TV/Des Moines, IA cameraman for filming a tornado striking Jordan, Iowa
Perry Como	Personal Award for the NBC special Perry Como's Christmas in Austria
Sy Pearlman	Personal Award to the NBC News producer for "The Sawyer Brothers," a segment of Weekend that raised suspicion of the guilt and conviction of two brothers in a North Carolina kidnapping
Bruce Morton and Hughes Rudd	Joint Personal Awards to the anchors of CBS Morning News
WLBT-TV/Jackson, MS	"Power Politics in Mississippi," an episode of PROBE that examined legal ethics and conflicts of interest
WBBM-TV/Chicago, IL and Franklin McMahon	Primary Colors, An Artist on the Campaign Trail, which followed the WBBM reporter/artist creating works depicting the presidential campaigns
NBC	Sybil
Associated Press Radio	The Garden Plot: Food as a Weapon
KCET/Los Angeles, CA	Visions

== 1977 ==
Recipient	Area of Excellence
WNET/New York, NY	A Good Dissonance Like a Man, a documentary on Charles Ives directed by Theodore Timreck
WNET/New York, NY	The Police Tapes
WNET/New York, NY and WETA-TV/Washington, DC	MacNeil/Lehrer Report
WNBC-TV/New York, NY	Buyline: Betty Furness, reported by Betty Furness
WNBC-TV/New York, NY	Award for NewsCenter 4's "F.I.N.D." investigative segments
WCBS-TV/New York, NY	Camera Three
WHLN/Harlan, KY	Coverage of a flood that hit the Harlan area in April 1977
National Public Radio	Crossroads: Sea Island Sketches, produced by Robert Montiegel
WHA/Madison, WI	Earplay
ABC and Lorimar Productions	ABC Theater, for Green Eyes
ABC and David Wolper	Roots
Multimedia Program Productions	Joshua's Confusion, an episode of Young People's Specials, a film about an Amish child in the 20th century directed by Tom G. Robertson
Metropolitan Opera Association	Live from the Met
Norman Lear	Personal Award for All in the Family
Paul Hume	Personal Award to the WGMS/Rockville, MD personality for A Variable Feast, his classical music show
Steve Allen	Personal Award to the creator/host of the KCET (Los Angeles, CA)/PBS series Meeting of Minds
KABC-TV/Los Angeles, CA	Award for reports into police accountability by Wayne Satz in incidents involving civilian shootings
KPFA-FM/Berkeley, CA	Science Story, produced by Laurie Garrett and Adi Gevins
NBC	Tut: The Boy King, directed by Sid Smith and narrated by Orson Welles
NBC, Arthur Rankin, and Jules Bass	The Hobbit
WPIX-TV/New York, NY	The Lifer's Group, I Am My Brother's Keeper, a documentary about prisoners at Rahway State Prison produced by Richard N. Hughes
MTM Enterprises	The Mary Tyler Moore Show
KSJN/St Paul, MN	The Prairie was Quiet, produced by Greg Barron
WBTV/Charlotte, NC	The Rowe String Quartet Plays on Your Imagination, a performance by the Rowe String Quartet and the North Carolina Dance Theater produced by Carol Wonsavage
London Weekend Television	Upstairs, Downstairs
KCMO-TV/Kansas City, MO	"Where Have All the Flood Cars Gone?" which traced the re-selling of flood-damaged automobiles
WXYZ/Detroit, MI	Winter's Fear, a documentary examining a series of child abductions and murders by the Oakland County Child Killer

== 1978 ==
Recipient	Area of Excellence
Tomorrow Entertainment/Medcom Company and CBS	The Body Human: The Vital Connection
CBS and MTM Productions	Lou Grant
CBS News	30 Minutes
CBS News	"The Battle for South Africa," an episode of CBS Reports reported by Bill Moyers
CBS Radio News	CBS World News Roundup
WQED-TV/Pittsburgh, PA	Award for the Once Upon a Classic adaptation of A Connecticut Yankee in King Arthur's Court
Baptist Radio and TV Commission	A River to the Sea, a documentary on the English language narrated by Alexander Scourby and aired on CBS' Look Up and Live
WENH-TV/Durham, NH	Arts in New Hampshire
Four D Productions/Trisene Corporation and ABC	Barney Miller
Newsweek Broadcasting	Cartoon-A-Torial, animated editorial cartoons
The National Radio Theatre of Chicago (aired on WFMT)	Chicago Radio Theatre
KHET-TV/Honolulu, HI	Damien, a documentary profiling the life of Jozef De Veuster ("Father Damien") and his caring of patients at a leper colony on Molokai, Hawaii
National Public Radio	Dialogues on a Tightrope: An Italian Mosaic, a documentary by Josh Darsa examining Italy's political turmoil
Titus Productions, Inc. and NBC	Holocaust
Survival Anglia Ltd./World Wildlife Fund and NBC	Mysterious Castles of Clay
NBC Radio Network	Second Sunday
Jewish Theological Seminary and NBC Radio Network	The Eternal Light
WMUK/Kalamazoo, MI	Award for the station's presentation of live-performance radio dramas
KGO-TV/San Francisco, CA	Old Age: Do Not Go Gentle, a documentary examining treatment of the elderly
KQED-TV/San Francisco, CA	Over Easy, a program on aging hosted by Hugh Downs
Bob Keeshan	Personal Award for Keeshan's work on Captain Kangaroo and his promoting of "quality children's programs on American television"
Richard S. Salant	Personal Award for Salant's leadership at CBS News and "his staunch defense of the First Amendment guarantee of a free press"
WDVM-TV/Washington, DC	Race War in Rhodesia, a documentary with Carl Rowan that examined political tensions in Rhodesia and Central Africa
WDVM-TV/Washington, DC	Your Health and Your Wallet, a mini-series examining the rising costs of medical treatments
WABE/Atlanta, GA	The Eyewitness Who Wasn't, a documentary examining how evidence against the Marietta Seven was manufactured
WOCB/West Yarmouth, MA	The Last Voyage of the 'Cap'n Bill', which captured conversations with fishermen and townspeople affected by a fishing vessel's final voyage
Henson Associates	The Muppet Show
WAVE-TV/Louisville, KY	Whose Child is This? an examination by Alfred Shands of the effects of child abuse

== 1979 ==
Recipient	Area of Excellence
ABC	ABC Afterschool Special, for the episode "A Special Gift"
ABC	Friendly Fire
ABC	Valentine, a television movie starring Jack Albertson and Mary Martin and directed by Lee Philips about a love story in a retirement home
CBS News	CBS News Sunday Morning
CBS News	CBS Reports for The Boston Goes to China, reported by Ed Bradley
Roger Mudd (CBS News)	Personal Award for Mudd's CBS Reports interview with Edward Kennedy
CBS Entertainment, The Konigsberg Company, and Warner Bros. Television	Dummy
WCBS/New York, NY	"Follow That Cab: The Great Taxi Rip-off," an investigation into fraudulent overcharges by New York City taxi and limousine services
WGBH-FM/Boston, MA	Currier Bell, Esquire, a presentation of Masterpiece Radio Theatre
WGBH-TV/Boston, MA	World, executive produced by David Fanning
KNXT/Los Angeles, CA	Down at the Dunbar, a documentary produced by Vin Di Bona which examined the entertainment legacy of the Dunbar Hotel
Children's Radio Theatre	Henny Penny Playwrighting Contest, a contest for children playwrights
WTTW/Chicago, IL	Miles To Go Before We Sleep, a documentary on aging and retirement produced by Ken Voss and Chuck Collins
WTTW/Chicago, IL and PBS	Little Rock Central High School, an episode of As We See It directed by Chris Pechin about the Little Rock Crisis
Robert Trout (ABC News)	Personal Award in recognition of Trout's near-half-century of work in news and commentary
Sylvia Fine Kaye	Personal Award to the producer/hostess of Musical Comedy Tonight, which aired as part of Great Performances
KRON-TV/San Francisco, CA	Politics of Poison, a documentary produced by John D. Rabinovitch and narrated by Michael Learned examining the effects of herbicide spraying in Northern California
WMAQ-TV/Chicago, IL	"Strip and Search," an investigation into routine strip searches of female suspects by the Chicago Police Department
KTVI/St. Louis, MO	"The Adventures of Whistling Sam," an animated editorial cartoon airing on Extra
KOOL-TV/Phoenix, AZ	The Long Eyes of Kitt Peak, a documentary on the Kitt Peak National Observatory directed by Bill Miller and narrated by Mary Jo West
Canadian Broadcasting Corporation	"The Longest Journey," an episode of Open Circuit about pregnancy produced by Eithne Black and written by Elizabeth Grove-White
KSJN/Minneapolis, MN	The Way to 8-A, produced by Greg Barron, which explored legal abuses in the mental health commitment process at Hennepin County General Hospital
NBC and Aubrey/Hamner Productions	When Hell Was in Session
NBC and BBC	Treasures of the British Crown a program by Huw Wheldon about the Royal Collection
