= The Early Show =

American breakfast television program

- Genre: Breakfast television
- Presented by: (see section)
- Theme music composer: Chris Bowman (1999–2002); Sting (2002–2006); James Horner (2006–2011); James Trivers, Elizabeth Myers & Alan James Pasqua (2011–2012)
- Country of origin: United States
- Original language: English
- No. of seasons: 14
- No. of episodes: 3,580

Production
- Executive producer: Batt Humphreys
- Production locations: General Motors Building, New York City
- Camera setup: Multi-camera
- Running time: 120 minutes (two hours)
- Production company: CBS News Productions

Original release
- Network: CBS
- Release: November 1, 1999 – January 7, 2012

Related
- CBS This Morning

The Early Show is an American former morning television show that aired on CBS from November 1, 1999 to January 7, 2012, replacing the original incarnation of CBS This Morning, and the ninth attempt at a morning news-talk program by the network since 1954. The program originally broadcast from the General Motors Building in New York City.

The Early Show, like many of its predecessors, traditionally placed third in the ratings, behind NBC's Today and ABC's Good Morning America.

Much like Today and its fellow NBC program The Tonight Show, The Early Show title was analogous to that of CBS's late-night talk show, The Late Show. Unlike CBS' other attempts at a morning news program (which emphasize hard news), The Early Show followed the breakfast television style format of its two other competitors, which have long used a lighter soft news, lifestyle and infotainment approach.

On November 15, 2011, CBS announced the cancellation of The Early Show, and replacement by a new morning program that CBS News chairman Jeff Fager and president David Rhodes stated would "redefine the morning television landscape." The Early Show ended its twelve-year run on January 7, 2012, replaced two days later on January 9 by the second version of CBS This Morning.

== History of CBS's morning news shows ==
=== The Morning Show (1954) ===
The Morning Show
- Presented by: Walter Cronkite; Charles Collingwood
- Country of origin: United States
- No. of seasons: 3

Production
- Running time: 120 minutes (1954–1955); 60 minutes (1955–1956)

Original release
- Network: CBS
- Release: March 15, 1954 – February 17, 1956

CBS' first attempt at a morning program debuted on March 15, 1954, with The Morning Show, originally hosted by Walter Cronkite with Charles Collingwood and very similar in format to Today (which, like the pioneering NBC morning program, also ran for two hours from 7:00 to 9:00 a.m. Eastern Time until it was reduced to one hour to accommodate the premiere of Captain Kangaroo in 1955). Additional hosts over the years included Jack Paar, John Henry Faulk and Dick Van Dyke. Paar, the most successful of them in drawing an audience, made significant changes in the tone of the program during his tenure as host, casting it into a talk program with some infotainment elements but featuring an emphasis on humor and conversation, reminiscent of the kind of morning radio show he had done prior to World War II. In 1956, Paar was moved from The Morning Show to his own late-morning talk program on the network, which aired after Captain Kangaroo. (Paar left CBS to take over NBC's The Tonight Show in 1957.)

=== Good Morning! with Will Rogers Jr. (1956) ===
Good Morning! with Will Rogers Jr.
- Presented by: Will Rogers Jr.
- Country of origin: United States
- No. of seasons: 1

Production
- Running time: 60 minutes

Original release
- Network: CBS
- Release: February 20, 1956 – April 5, 1957

On February 2, 1956, CBS changed the title and host when it premiered Good Morning! with Will Rogers Jr., which was hosted by the former U.S. Congressman and journalist. A one hour program that aired from 7:00 to 8:00 a.m. Eastern Time and provided news and information, it lasted for 14 months ending its run on April 5, 1957.

=== The Jimmy Dean Show (1957) ===
The Jimmy Dean Show
- Presented by: Jimmy Dean
- Country of origin: United States
- No. of seasons: 1

Production
- Running time: 45 minutes

Original release
- Network: CBS
- Release: April 8 – December 13, 1957

On April 8, 1957, a different version of The Morning Show premiered, a variety program hosted by country music singer Jimmy Dean. The 45-minute program aired at 7:00 a.m. Eastern Time; it was followed by a 15-minute news program, the CBS Morning News, anchored by Richard C. Hottelet, and later Stuart Novins, which led into Captain Kangaroo at 8:00 a.m. It ended on December 13 after eight months.

=== The CBS Morning News (1963) ===
The CBS Morning News
- Presented by: Mike Wallace (1963–1966); Joseph Benti (1966–1970); John Hart (1969–1973); Bernard Kalb (1970–1972); Nelson Benton (1972–1973); Hughes Rudd (1973–1977); Sally Quinn (1973–1974); Bruce Morton (1974–1977); Barry Serafin (1977–1979); Lesley Stahl (1977–1979); Richard Threlkeld (1977–1979)
- Country of origin: United States
- No. of seasons: 16

Production
- Running time: 30 minutes (1963–1969); 60 minutes (1969–1979)

Original release
- Network: CBS
- Release: September 2, 1963 – January 25, 1979

CBS did not make any serious attempt to program against Today for eight years. The CBS Morning News debuted on September 2, 1963; the program was similar in style to its CBS Evening News counterpart in that it was also a hard news-focused program, featuring various hosts and correspondents from CBS News over the years. It debuted as a half-hour broadcast anchored by Mike Wallace, who joined the network that year, and aired Monday through Friday at 10:00 a.m. Eastern Time. Coincidentally, it replaced the daytime magazine program Calendar, which was hosted by Wallace's future 60 Minutes colleague Harry Reasoner.

In August 1965, CBS decided it could get better ratings by airing reruns of I Love Lucy in the 10:00 a.m. slot. The network moved the Morning News to 7:05 a.m. (although most affiliates carried it at 7:30 a.m. on tape delay). Wallace only lasted one more year after the move. Wallace left the program to serve as co-host on the news magazine show 60 Minutes (initially aired bi-weekly in September 1968), which saw him cover topics such as Richard Nixon's 1968 comeback presidential campaign.

Los Angeles newsman Joseph Benti was selected to replace Wallace. Notably, Benti was at a bar near the CBS Broadcast Center waiting for his shift to start as morning anchor on the early hours of June 6, 1968 when someone came onto the place to say that Robert F. Kennedy had been shot at midnight in California (which was 3:00 a.m in New York), necessitating having to try and get onto the air earlier than expected, complete with reports from Terry Drinkwater that saw Benti joined by Cronkite and Wallace midway through. It was during Joseph Benti's run (through August 28, 1970) that the program became the first regularly scheduled one-hour newscast on network television on March 31, 1969. Until 1981, it preceded Captain Kangaroo on CBS's morning schedule from 7:00 to 8:00 a.m. Eastern Time. The new hour-long format featured John Hart reading the news headlines from Washington, D.C. and CBS News Moscow correspondent Hughes Rudd as an occasional contributor. After Hart replaced Benti as the main anchor in New York City, the Washington anchor desk was assumed by Bernard Kalb until 1972, and by Nelson Benton for a year afterwards. It was announced in May 1973 that Benton and Hart would be replaced in midsummer.

In an effort to emulate Today, which had Barbara Walters as a co-anchor, Rudd was teamed up with former The Washington Post reporter Sally Quinn, who received considerable publicity despite having no prior television experience. The broadcasts did little to shape the ratings beyond third place, with Quinn garnering little enthusiasm. In January 1974, she was removed from the anchor desk, with the network attempting to allow her to be a contributor from Washington. She declined the perceived demotion and departed the show on February 1. A more experienced correspondent, Bruce Morton, would replace her in the Washington bureau, remaining there until 1977. During that period, the newscast evolved into a straightforward delivery of the morning news, much like Cronkite's evening newscast. Despite the anchor turnover through the years, the broadcast set a consistent tone which emphasized news and ideas over celebrity gossip or self-help tips. Following Morton's departure, correspondent Barry Serafin took over anchor duties at the Washington desk. Morton and Rudd were each awarded a Peabody Award for their work in 1976. The anchor desk was subsequently shared by the team of Lesley Stahl and Richard Threlkeld (who co-anchored the program from 1977 to 1979), while Morton and Rudd returned to provide feature reports and commentary; Rudd would again leave the program in 1979.

=== The Morning (1979) ===
The Morning
- Presented by: Bob Schieffer (1979–1980); Charles Kuralt (1980–1982); Diane Sawyer (1981-1982)
- Country of origin: United States
- No. of seasons: 3

Production
- Running time: 60 minutes (1979–1981); 90 minutes (1981–1982)

Original release
- Network: CBS
- Release: January 29, 1979 – January 15, 1982

On Sunday, January 28, 1979, CBS revamped the program, premiering Morning, which was titled in accordance to the day of the week (Monday Morning, Tuesday Morning, etc.). The weekday Morning series competed with Good Morning America and Today. Charles Kuralt hosted Sundays, while Bob Schieffer hosted the rest of the week; Kuralt took over the daily broadcasts as well starting on October 27, 1980.

The program featured long-form pieces from CBS News bureaus, and many viewed it as a highbrow, classy newscast. Despite critical acclaim, the program remained dead last in the ratings, and CBS was under more pressure from affiliates to present a more viable morning competitor, particularly since the Sunday edition did better with viewers. So on September 28, 1981, Morning dropped the days of the week from its title (except for CBS News Sunday Morning), was extended to 90 minutes and added Diane Sawyer as co-host. In the process, Captain Kangaroo was reduced to a half-hour daily and pushed to an earlier time period (7:00 a.m.).

=== The CBS Morning News (1982) ===
The CBS Morning News
- Presented by: Bill Kurtis (1982–1985); Diane Sawyer (1982–1984); Jane Wallace, interim co-host (1984–1985); Meredith Vieira, interim co-host (1984–1985); Phyllis George (1985); Maria Shriver (1985–1986); Forrest Sawyer (1985–1986); Bruce Morton, substitute host (1986–1987); Faith Daniels, substitute host (1986–1987)
- Country of origin: United States
- No. of seasons: 5

Production
- Running time: 120 minutes (including commercial)

Original release
- Network: CBS
- Release: January 18, 1982 – January 9, 1987

On January 18, 1982, again at the expense of Captain Kangaroo, Morning was expanded to the same two-hour format that Today and GMA were utilizing. Along the way it reassumed the title of The CBS Morning News (not to be confused with CBS's earlier morning newscast, the CBS Early Morning News, later retitled as the CBS Morning News). Kuralt was replaced on the weekday broadcasts on March 15, 1982. By this time management decided that morning news programming should be more competitive and hired Bill Kurtis, anchor of the highly rated evening newscasts at WBBM-TV in Chicago, as Sawyer's co-host. The Sunday edition of Morning, with Kuralt as host, was kept; it remains on the air under its original title, CBS News Sunday Morning (now hosted by Jane Pauley).

By the fall of 1982, Captain Kangaroo had disappeared from the daily schedule, and the new team of Kurtis and Sawyer were anchoring three hours of news in the morning, as they were also seen on the CBS Early Morning News an hour earlier.

Their teamwork helped boost the program's ratings, albeit briefly; George Merlis, a former Good Morning America producer hired to revamp the broadcast, is also credited by most network insiders with nearly doubling viewership numbers for The CBS Morning News by March 1983. The numbers continued to climb during the summer; during one week in August 1983, it passed Today for the second place spot behind GMA, and was in closing distance behind the latter program for the #1 spot before it dropped back to third place again. After Merlis was relieved from his duties for his trouble, Sawyer, anxious to move on, left in the fall of 1984 to become the first female correspondent on 60 Minutes.

CBS News correspondents Jane Wallace and Meredith Vieira briefly alternated as interim co-host in an on-air try-out that lasted several months, but both were passed over for the permanent spot. Instead, CBS settled for former Miss America and The NFL Today co-host Phyllis George, who was given a three-year contract following a mere two-week trial run. Disputes between Kurtis and CBS over his role with George "over matters of journalistic style and substance" led to Kurtis returning to WBBM-TV in June.

The lowest point of her very brief tenure came on May 14, 1985, during George's interview with false rape accuser Cathleen Mae Webb and the man whom she had falsely accused, Gary Dotson. In an effort to get the two to make amends to each other, George made a simple suggestion: "How about a hug?" Both Webb and Dotson graciously refused. That infamous interview alienated audiences and was blasted by critics, helping to put an unpleasant close to George's television career at this initial mark. Once again, Bob Schieffer served as a brief replacement. Phyllis George eventually left CBS for good that fall.

Maria Shriver, who had joined CBS as a West Coast feature reporter in 1983, and Forrest Sawyer, new to the network, were named co-anchors of The CBS Morning News on August 30, 1985. After a respectable year albeit still placing third in the ratings, Shriver and Sawyer made their last appearance on the program on August 1, 1986, after CBS News president Van Gordon Sauter announced that the early morning time slot would be handed to a newly created unit in the CBS Broadcast Group. Prodded by network affiliates who wanted something lighter than the news-oriented formats it had previously offered, CBS decided that an entertainment format might work better against Good Morning America and Today, and planning began for a new show that would come to be called The Morning Program. Bruce Morton and Faith Daniels became the first in a string of substitutes to host Morning News until it left the air. With the loss of what had been its biggest block of air time in one form or another for two decades, dozens of employees were laid off, a factor that cost Sauter his job.

In an August 1986 Newsweek article, columnist Jonathan Alter wrote regarding the move, "The CBS Morning News was simply shot dead. Underappreciated co-anchors Forrest Sawyer and Maria Shriver left the air with a classy farewell after the network's announcement that the perennially lagging show would be canceled by the end of the year."

Tom Shales reported in The Washington Post, "throughout the industry there is shock and derision for the way CBS has handled [the] Morning News, so long its problem child. Competitors are saying the Morning News fiasco is a symptom of a new disarray in CBS News, and some question whether current CBS News executives will all be able to ride out the storm."

=== The Morning Program (1987) ===
The Morning Program
- Presented by: Rolland Smith; Mariette Hartley
- Country of origin: United States
- No. of seasons: 1

Production
- Running time: 90 minutes (including commercial)

Original release
- Network: CBS
- Release: January 12 – November 27, 1987

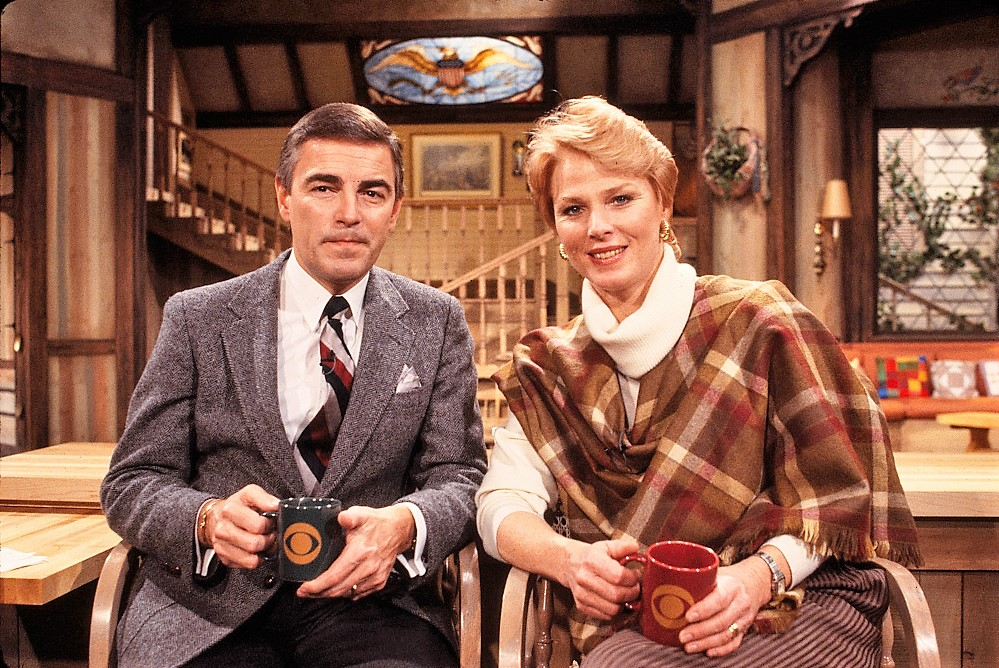
Rolland Smith and Mariette Hartley co-hosting "The Morning Program" in 1987

On January 12, 1987, The Morning Program made its debut hosted by actress Mariette Hartley and Rolland Smith, former longtime anchor at WCBS-TV in New York City. Radio personality Mark McEwen handled the weather, while comedian Bob Saget did comedy bits. Produced by a newly created division, the show ran for 90 minutes (7:30 to 9:00 a.m. Eastern and Pacific, 6:30 to 8:00 a.m. Central and Mountain) behind a briefly expanded 90-minute CBS Early Morning News broadcast (6:00 to 7:30 a.m. local; although most larger-market affiliates pre-empted all or part of the 6:00 a.m. hour to carry a locally produced morning newscast), which had dropped "Early" from its title.

However, The Morning Program, with its awkward mix of news, entertainment and comedy, became the joke of the industry, receiving scathing reviews; Hartley in particular was panned by critics. After its first week garnered a 3.1 rating, it dropped deep into last place and never recovered. At one point, it generated a mere 10 percent share, the lowest ratings that CBS had seen in the morning slot in five years. The show was also dragging down ratings for the syndicated programming that most affiliates aired in the 9:00 Eastern and Pacific/8:00 Central and Mountain slot. While they had wanted lighter fare in the morning, The Morning Program was far lighter than even they had anticipated. Many of them were threatening to preempt the show unless changes were made (for instance, CBS affiliate KKTV in Colorado Springs, Colorado replaced the morning block with syndicated cartoon programming). CBS patriarch William S. Paley quickly soured on the show, saying it was too "theatrical" for that time of day. Finally, on September 28, 1987, CBS announced it would cancel the show in November and return the time slot to the news division after a 10½-month run. Hartley and Smith were dumped (the former departed the program two weeks early and was replaced by Sandy Hill, who had formerly co-hosted Good Morning America), while Saget had left several months earlier to star in the ABC sitcom Full House. A longtime producer summed up this version of the program upon its demise by saying, "...everyone thought we had the lowest ratings you could have in the morning. The Morning Program proved us wrong".

=== CBS This Morning (1987) ===
On November 30, 1987, The Morning Program was replaced by the original CBS This Morning. It lasted for twelve years, staying in third place for its entire run. However, it was far more competitive than its predecessors had ever been (with the aforementioned KKTV, after previously dropping The Morning Program, beginning to air CBS This Morning in early 1989).

By May 1999, CBS had managed to corral Bryant Gumbel to be a host on the morning show, although he did not join the program until after its cancellation; at the time, it was reported that the CBS morning show had averaged slightly below three million viewers on average, with ABC being second at 3.7 million and Today being number one with 6.1 million. It ended on October 29, 1999 and was replaced by The Early Show. In 2012, the second iteration of CBS This Morning replaced The Early Show.

== History ==
=== Gumbel, Clayson, McEwen and Chen (November 1, 1999–2002) ===
The Early Show began on November 1, 1999 (around the time when Viacom, a former CBS division, had purchased the network) when CBS executives successfully lured former Today host Bryant Gumbel to head up the broadcast, teamed with ABC News correspondent Jane Clayson. Unlike with This Morning, CBS asked its affiliates to carry the two-hour program in its entirety. Julie Chen read the news, while Mark McEwen of Live by Request, the sole holdover from CBS This Morning, did the weather. Initial ratings were not encouraging, and were actually lower than those of CBS This Morning. Gumbel left on May 17, 2002, and shortly thereafter Clayson and McEwen were replaced.

Clayson may be best known for her awkward confrontation with Early Show food and style contributor Martha Stewart during this period; Stewart was involved in the ImClone stock trading case, but retained her Early Show contributor duties during the initial stages of the controversy. CBS required Stewart to address the issue as a condition of keeping those contributor duties. Stewart, upon consulting her legal team, agreed to take questions on-air, but not in a separate interview. As a result, during one of Stewart's usual live cooking segments (in June 2002), Clayson, who normally assisted Stewart with preparing the meal, asked her to comment on her involvement with ImClone and her selling of company stock just one day before an application for a new cancer drug developed by the pharmaceutical company was rejected by the Food and Drug Administration; a visibly uncomfortable Stewart, obsessively chopping vegetables for a salad, evaded Clayson's questions, citing her inability to comment on an ongoing investigation (Stewart was indicted in 2003, tried and convicted in 2004, and served five months in federal prison for her involvement in the case). Stewart stopped contributing to the program after the appearance, which was immortalized in an NBC TV-movie of Stewart's life that aired a few months later (with Cybill Shepherd playing the role of Stewart).

=== Smith, Storm, Chen, Syler and Price (October 2002–December 2006) ===
On October 28, 2002, The Early Show overhauled its hosting staff. The new team consisted of Chen, Harry Smith (former host of Biography and CBS This Morning), Hannah Storm (former commentator for NBC Sports), Rene Syler (who joined the program after serving as a news anchor at CBS' owned-and-operated station KTVT in Dallas), and weatherman Dave Price (joining the program after a run as a morning meteorologist at New York City Fox O&O WNYW), who also worked at WCBS-TV for some time after joining The Early Show. To keep affiliates happy, CBS went back to the local/national hybrid format originated on CBS This Morning in 1997. The program also had a number of "correspondents" who conducted short segments on specific issues, including Martha Stewart (until not long after the aforementioned segment with Jane Clayson), Martha Quinn, Bobby Flay and Bob Vila, among others. In 2004, Susan Koeppen became the program's consumer correspondent.

On October 30, 2006, The Early Show received a revamp, featuring new graphics (with a new blue and orange color scheme instead of blue and yellow) and music similar to that used on the CBS Evening News (which were also rolled out on Up to the Minute and the CBS Morning News in early October). On December 4, 2006, it was announced that Rene Syler would leave the show by the end of the month; her last show was December 22, 2006.

=== Smith, Storm, Chen, Mitchell, and Price (December 2006–December 2007) ===
On December 7, 2006, CBS News named Russ Mitchell (who had been co-anchor of the program's Saturday edition since its inception as CBS News Saturday Morning in 1997) as the news anchor for the program starting January 2, 2007. On November 28, 2007, it was announced that Hannah Storm was leaving as the program's co-anchor; her last day was December 7, 2007.

=== Smith, Rodriguez, Chen, Mitchell and Price (January 2008–January 2010) ===
On December 5, 2007, CBS announced that Maggie Rodriguez (who had joined the program earlier that year as anchor of its Saturday edition) would succeed Storm as co-anchor. During that month, the CBS Evening News shared its studio/set with The Early Show. The Early Show itself debuted a new set on January 7, 2008, when it also abandoned the aforementioned local/national hybrid format, opting to require its stations carry the entire two-hour broadcast. Ratings for The Early Show dropped with the institution of these changes. However, the gap between the program and second-place Good Morning America remained virtually consistent as all three morning shows saw similar ratings erosion.

On April 16, The Early Show scored a coup with the broadcast of a live musical performance by Susan Boyle. The Early Show enjoyed a relatively successful May sweeps, racking up a 5% increase in total viewership year-to-year while remaining flat in the 25-to-54-year-old demographic, at a time when both Today and Good Morning America were shedding viewers to the tune of 3 and 4% respectively.

Howard Kurtz's Washington Post profile of CBS Early Show co-host Maggie Rodriguez said her addition to the program accounts for "an uptick in the ratings, lifting spirits at the broadcast". Rodriguez landed some high-profile interviews with the grandparents of Caylee Anthony, Levi Johnston, and disgraced former Roman Catholic priest Alberto Cutié, who later became an Episcopal minister. Rodriguez stated that "If [I] were to program a show for my viewing pleasure, I would make it all news ...[B]ut we're programming for all of America. We have to include Jon and Kate — regardless of whether I personally care, they're on the cover of every magazine. You can't be so highbrow that you only cover hard news. I'm not a journalistic snob." In addition to her duties on the morning show, Rodriguez regularly filled in for Katie Couric on the CBS Evening News.

On January 13, 2010, CBS announced that news anchor Russ Mitchell would exit The Early Show at the end of the week, leaving a gap in the program's anchor lineup. He became the national correspondent for CBS and would remain as anchor of the Sunday edition of the CBS Evening News. Around this time, Koeppen left The Early Show to become a primary news anchor for CBS-owned KDKA-TV in Pittsburgh; her spot as consumer correspondent was not replaced.

=== Smith, Rodriguez, Chen, Hill and Price (January–December 2010) ===
In January 2010, Erica Hill became the program's news update anchor, joining Smith, Rodriguez, Price and now features correspondent Chen.

The Early Show became the last morning network news/talk program to begin broadcasting in high definition on April 26, 2010. The Evening News control room was to be used to base the program, as construction was under way for a new control room for The Early Show at the General Motors Building. New graphics were now overlaid to accommodate added screen space, and were also used throughout other CBS News programs.

=== Wragge, Hill, Chen, Glor and Castro (January–September 2011) ===
Smith, Price and Rodriguez were fired from the program in November 2010. Erica Hill and Chris Wragge (who previously anchored the Saturday edition) were appointed as anchors of the weekday Early Show on January 3, 2011. Marysol Castro was also added as a weather anchor, replacing Dave Price; while Julie Chen remained a part of the staff, presenting additional feature stories, with Jeff Glor taking Hill's spot as news anchor. Chen, the wife of CBS President & CEO Les Moonves, was the only one to stay with the program since its inception before leaving the full-time anchor position to become host of The Talk in late 2010; however, she remained with The Early Show as a special contributing anchor.

In March 2011, the program introduced a redesigned set, which included a new anchor desk backdrop, a new reporter area and a blue color scheme. On September 2, 2011, it was announced that Marysol Castro would be leaving her post as weather anchor effective immediately.

=== Wragge, Hill and Glor (September 2011–January 2012) ===
After Castro's departure, the hosts had cut directly to local CBS affiliates to provide forecast cut-ins (with a narrated national outlook available to stations that did not provide cut-ins due to the absence of a news department), making CBS the only one of the three major broadcast morning shows without a national forecast segment.

In 2011, the program had begun focusing on hard news in contrast to the other network morning news programs, which show a mix of hard news, lighter news and infotainment. Coverage consisted of national and international news, including occasional town halls with political leaders and in-depth coverage of major events.

==== Cancellation and final broadcast ====
On November 15, 2011, CBS News announced The Early Show would be cancelled, and replaced by a new hard news and interview-focused program on January 9, 2012. The new program's title was announced on December 1, as CBS This Morning. Erica Hill was the only holdover from The Early Show that became part of the new program, joined by Charlie Rose and Gayle King; Hill was replaced by then-CBS News Washington, D.C. correspondent Norah O'Donnell in July 2012 (Hill subsequently became a co-anchor of the weekend edition of Today).

Chris Wragge returned to WCBS-TV as an anchor; originally co-anchoring on both WCBS' 6:00 p.m. newscast and sister station WLNY-TV's 9:00 p.m. newscast, before being moved to WCBS' weekday morning and noon newscasts in 2013. Jeff Glor now appears on CBS This Morning as a special correspondent, and became the Sunday evening CBS Evening News anchor on January 15, 2012 following Russ Mitchell's departure to become the lead anchor at WKYC-TV in Cleveland.

The final edition of The Early Show aired on January 7, 2012, with that week's final Saturday edition being broadcast from the set of the CBS Evening News at CBS Broadcast Center, anchored by Rebecca Jarvis, news anchor Betty Nguyen and weather anchor Lonnie Quinn.

== On-air staff ==
=== Anchors ===
- Bryant Gumbel – anchor (1999–2002)
- Jane Clayson – anchor (1999–2002)
- Mark McEwen – anchor (Summer 2002)
- Tom Bergeron – anchor (Summer 2002)
- Russ Mitchell – anchor (Summer 2002)
- Gretchen Carlson – anchor (Summer 2002)
- John Roberts – anchor (Summer 2002)
- Julie Chen – anchor (2002–2010)
- Harry Smith – anchor (2002–2010)
- Hannah Storm – anchor (2002–2007)
- Rene Syler – anchor (2002–2006)
- Maggie Rodriguez – anchor (2008–2010)
- Chris Wragge – anchor (2011–2012)
- Erica Hill – anchor (2011–2012)

=== News anchors ===
- Julie Chen – news anchor (1999–2007)
- Russ Mitchell – news anchor (2007–2010)
- Erica Hill – news anchor (2010–2011)
- Jeff Glor – news anchor (2011–2012)

=== Weather anchors ===
- Mark McEwen – weather anchor (1999–2002)
- Ira Joe Fisher - weather anchor (2002)
- Dave Price – weather anchor (2002–2010)
- Marysol Castro – weather anchor (2011)

== Saturday edition ==
Alongside the relaunch of the weekday program as The Early Show, CBS News Saturday Morning, which had debuted in 1997, was also relocated to the General Motors Building and renamed The Saturday Early Show. In 2008, the title of the Saturday program was shortened to The Early Show, fully in line with the weekday program. Anchors of the Saturday edition during this era included Russ Mitchell (1999–2007 and 2011), Thalia Assuras (1999–2002), Gretchen Carlson (2002–2005), Tracy Smith (2005–2007), Chris Wragge and Erica Hill (both 2008–10), and Rebecca Jarvis (2010 and 2011–12), alongside weather anchors Ira Joe Fisher (1999–2006) and Lonnie Quinn (2006–12).

Unlike its competitors Today and Good Morning America, The Early Show did not have a Sunday edition, due to the continued success of CBS News Sunday Morning, which maintained a distinct newsmagazine format with long-form feature reports and in-depth interview segments.

== Ratings ==
CBS has been the perennial third-place finisher in the morning race since 1976, placing second only a few times in the past 30 years. CBS surpassed ABC's Good Morning America for second place during the weeks of January 17, 1977 and December 28, 1998, running behind first-place Today which was in first place both times. However, The CBS Morning News outrated Today, then often in second place (with Good Morning America in first), for a few weeks in 1984 while Today co-host Jane Pauley was on maternity leave.

In September 2007, CBS sought to get The Early Show out of the ratings basement by hiring Shelley Ross, who previously served as executive producer of Good Morning America from 1999 to 2004. Significant changes were made to the program as Ross asserted her influence; on January 7, 2008, the network began requiring affiliates to air the program in its entirety, ending the local-national hybrid format and restricting the local news inserts to :25 and :55 minutes past the hour. CBS reportedly viewed the removal of those breaks as vital to creating a national profile for the program.

However, some CBS affiliates continued to air the entire program on a sister station in order to continue to airing a locally produced morning newscast during The Early Show's timeslot; WWL-TV in New Orleans never aired The Early Show, any of its previous versions or its successor CBS This Morning, opting to instead air the final two hours of its Eyewitness Morning News broadcast from 5:00 to 9:00 a.m. instead; however after former owner Belo acquired that station in 2007, The Early Show began airing in New Orleans on MyNetworkTV affiliate WUPL. WKRC-TV in Cincinnati began airing the full two-hour Early Show broadcast, while moving the third hour of its local morning newscast to the station's CW-affiliated subchannel. Salt Lake City's KUTV (which was formerly owned by the network until 2007) continued to preempt the program's first hour despite the network's insistence. KOTV in Tulsa and WFMY in Greensboro, North Carolina began airing the program in its entirety on a one-hour delay at 8:00 a.m. to accommodate a 7:00 a.m. hour of their local newscasts (in the case of KOTV, it chose to move the 8:00 a.m. hour of its morning newscast to its CW-affiliated sister station KQCW to comply with the new requirements).

Industry insiders considered Shelley Ross' influence to be a serious threat to raising the profile of the program to turn it into a true competitor to NBC's Today and ABC's Good Morning America. However, Ross was fired as executive producer after only six months, following frequent feuds with staff (particularly Smith and Chen), who reportedly informed management that either Ross would have to go or they would resign on their own.

Despite the change in staff in 2011, the program remained mired in third place, with a total average viewership of around 2 to 2.5 million viewers per week. The program also faced pressure from network management to take advantage of the redefining of CBS News as more of a hard news organization after the end of Katie Couric's tenure at the CBS Evening News, asking the program's staff to take advantage of stories presented on 60 Minutes and the CBS Evening News and expand upon them on the morning program rather than following the lead of Today and GMA to the letter.

== Theme music ==
The debut theme for The Early Show was "Sunrise," by Chris Bowman. Bowman created two versions of the song that were used until 2002 when Bryant Gumbel left the show. When the show reformatted with new hosts and set, an instrumental version of the same-titled track from Sting's 1999 hit album, "Brand New Day" until late October 2006, when it was replaced by a variant of the James Horner theme originally composed that year for the CBS Evening News. On January 7, 2008, as part of CBS's attempt to relaunch the show with new hosts and set, an updated version of Horner's composition was introduced; the theme was modified a number of times after the format change. On June 27, 2011, The Early Show began using a slower-tempoed version of the CBS Evening News theme by Trivers-Myers Music (the original version of which was first used on the evening news program from 1987 to 1991, before being revived in 2011 upon Scott Pelley taking over as anchor of the broadcast).

== International broadcasts ==
In Australia, The Early Show aired on Network 10 on weekday mornings from 4.00 a.m. under the title "The CBS Early Show", with the Friday edition being held over to the following Monday. A national weather map of Australia was inserted during local affiliate weather cutaways; however, no local news segments were inserted into the broadcast. Unlike the Seven Network's airing of NBC's Today and the Nine Network's airing of Good Morning America, The Early Show was not condensed or edited for broadcast by Ten. It was, however, pre-empted in most regional areas in favor of paid and religious programming.

== Awards ==
In 2010, The Early Show was nominated for a GLAAD Media Award for "Outstanding TV Journalism Segment" for the segment "Reverend's Revelation: Minister Speaks Out About Being Transgender".

== See also ==
- CBS News
- CBS Morning News
- CBS This Morning
- CBS Mornings
- CBS News Sunday Morning
- Today
- Good Morning America
- The Daily Buzz
- Breakfast television
