= 2011–12 United States network television schedule (late night) =

The 2011-12 network late-night television schedule for the four major English-language commercial broadcast networks in the United States covers the late night hours from September 2011 to August 2012. The schedule is followed by a list per network of returning series, new series, and series canceled after the 2010-11 television season.

PBS is not included, as member television stations have local flexibility over most of their schedules and broadcast times for network shows may vary, Ion Television is not included since the network schedules feature syndicated reruns, also not included are MyNetworkTV and The CW (as the programming services do not offer late night programs of any kind).

Fox is not included on the weekday schedule as Fox airs late night network programming only on Saturdays.

== Legend ==
- Light blue indicates Local programming.
- Gray indicates encore programming.
- Yellow indicates late night talk or variety shows.
- Gold indicates network news programming.

== Schedule ==
=== Monday-Friday ===
Network		11:00 pm	11:35 pm	12:00 am	12:30 am	1:00 am	1:30 am	2:00 am	2:30 am	3:00 am	3:30 am	4:00 am	4:30 am	5:00 am	5:30 am
ABC		Local Programming	Nightline	Jimmy Kimmel Live! (12:05)		Local Programming			ABC World News Now			America This Morning	Local Programming		
CBS		Local Programming	Late Show with David Letterman		The Late Late Show with Craig Ferguson (12:35)		Local Programming			Up To The Minute		CBS Morning News	Local Programming		
NBC	Fall	Local Programming	The Tonight Show with Jay Leno		Late Night with Jimmy Fallon		Last Call with Carson Daly	Today With Kathie Lee and Hoda (R)		Late Night with Jimmy Fallon (R)		Early Today	Local Programming		
NBC	Spring	Local Programming	The Tonight Show with Jay Leno		Late Night with Jimmy Fallon		Last Call with Carson Daly	Today With Kathie Lee and Hoda (R)		Mad Money (R)		Early Today	Local Programming		

=== Saturday ===
Network		11:00 pm	11:30 pm	12:00 am	12:30 am	1:00 am	1:30 am	2:00 am	2:30 am	3:00 am	3:30 am	4:00 am	4:30 am	5:00 am	5:30 am
NBC		Local programming	Saturday Night Live			Local programming (1:02)									
FOX	Fall	Encore Programming			Local Programming										
FOX	Spring	Q'Viva! The Chosen			Local Programming										
FOX	May	Encore Programming			Local Programming										

== By network ==
=== ABC ===
Returning series

- ABC World News Now
- America This Morning
- Jimmy Kimmel Live!
- Nightline

=== CBS ===
Returning series

- CBS Morning News
- Late Show with David Letterman
- The Late Late Show with Craig Ferguson
- Up to the Minute

=== FOX ===
Returning series:

- Encore Programming

New series

- Q'Viva! The Chosen

=== NBC ===
Returning series

- Early Today
- Last Call with Carson Daly
- Late Night with Jimmy Fallon
- Saturday Night Live
- The Tonight Show with Jay Leno

New series

- Mad Money (reruns)
- Today With Kathie Lee and Hoda (reruns)

Not returning from 2010-11:

- Poker After Dark
