= 2009–10 United States network television schedule (late night) =

These are the late night schedules for the four United States broadcast networks that offer programming during this time period, from September 2009 to August 2010. All times are Eastern or Pacific. Affiliates will fill non-network schedule with local, syndicated, or paid programming. Affiliates also have the option to preempt or delay network programming at their discretion.

== Legend ==
- Light blue indicates Local programming.
- Gray indicates encore programming.
- Yellow indicates late night talk or variety shows.
- Gold indicates network news programming.

== Schedule ==
=== Monday-Friday ===
Network		11:00 PM	11:35 PM	12:00 AM	12:30 AM	1:00 AM	1:30 AM	2:00 AM	2:30 AM	3:00 AM	3:30 AM	4:00 AM	4:30 AM	5:00 AM	5:30 AM
ABC		Local Programming	Nightline	Jimmy Kimmel Live! (12:05)		Local Programming				ABC World News Now			America This Morning	Local Programming	
CBS		Local Programming	Late Show with David Letterman		The Late Late Show with Craig Ferguson (12:35)		Local Programming			Up to the Minute			CBS Morning News	Local Programming	
NBC	Fall	Local Programming	The Tonight Show with Conan O'Brien		Late Night with Jimmy Fallon		Last Call with Carson Daly	Poker After Dark		Late Night with Jimmy Fallon (R)		Local Programming	Early Today	Local Programming	
NBC	Spring	Local Programming	The Tonight Show with Jay Leno		Late Night with Jimmy Fallon		Last Call with Carson Daly	Poker After Dark		Late Night with Jimmy Fallon (R)		Local Programming	Early Today	Local Programming	

Note: As the result of the Tonight Show conflict, O'Brien was let go at NBC, with his version of The Tonight Show ending on January 22, 2010. Jay Leno returned on March 1, 2010. O'Brien returned to late night in the Fall of 2010, with Conan airing on TBS.

=== Saturday ===
Network		11:00 PM	11:30 PM	12:00 AM	12:30 AM	1:00 AM	1:30 AM	2:00 AM	2:30 AM	3:00 AM	3:30 AM	4:00 AM	4:30 AM	5:00 AM	5:30 AM
NBC		Local programming	Saturday Night Live			Local programming (1:02)									
Fox	Fall	The Wanda Sykes Show		Sit Down, Shut Up	Local Programming										
Fox	Spring	The Wanda Sykes Show		Brothers (R)	Local Programming										
Fox	Summer	Encore Programming			Local Programming										

== By network ==
=== ABC ===
Returning series

- ABC World News Now
- America This Morning
- Jimmy Kimmel Live!
- Nightline

=== CBS ===
Returning series

- CBS Morning News
- Late Show with David Letterman
- The Late Late Show with Craig Ferguson
- Up to the Minute

=== Fox ===
New series

- Brothers (reruns)
- Encore Programming
- Sit Down, Shut Up
- The Wanda Sykes Show

Not returning from 2008-09:

- MADtv (revived by The CW in 2015-16)
- Talkshow with Spike Feresten

=== NBC ===
Returning series

- Early Today
- Last Call with Carson Daly
- Late Night with Jimmy Fallon
- Poker After Dark
- Saturday Night Live
- The Tonight Show with Conan O'Brien
- The Tonight Show with Jay Leno

Not returning from 2008-09:

- Late Night with Conan O'Brien
