= 2010–11 United States network television schedule (late night) =

These are the late night schedules for the four United States broadcast networks that offer programming during this time period, from September 2010 to August 2011. All times are Eastern or Pacific. Affiliates will fill non-network schedule with local, syndicated, or paid programming. Affiliates also have the option to preempt or delay network programming at their discretion.

== Legend ==
- Light blue indicates Local programming.
- Gray indicates encore programming.
- Yellow indicates late night talk or variety shows.
- Gold indicates network news programming.

== Schedule ==
=== Monday-Friday ===
Network	11:00 pm	11:35 pm	12:00 am	12:30 am	1:00 am	1:30 am	2:00 am	2:30 am	3:00 am	3:30 am	4:00 am	4:30 am	5:00 am	5:30 am
ABC	Local Programming	Nightline	Jimmy Kimmel Live!		Local Programming			ABC World News Now			America This Morning	Local Programming		
CBS	Local Programming	Late Show with David Letterman		The Late Late Show with Craig Ferguson (12:35)		Local Programming			Up To The Minute		CBS Morning News	Local Programming		
NBC	Local Programming	The Tonight Show with Jay Leno		Late Night with Jimmy Fallon		Last Call with Carson Daly	Poker After Dark		Late Night with Jimmy Fallon (R)		Early Today	Local Programming		

=== Saturday ===
Network	11:00 pm	11:30 pm	12:00 am	12:30 am	1:00 am	1:30 am	2:00 am	2:30 am	3:00 am	3:30 am	4:00 am	4:30 am	5:00 am	5:30 am
NBC	Local programming	Saturday Night Live			Local programming (1:02)									
FOX	Encore Programming			Local Programming										

== By network ==
=== ABC ===
Returning series

- ABC World News Now
- America This Morning
- Jimmy Kimmel Live!
- Nightline

=== CBS ===
Returning series

- CBS Morning News
- Late Show with David Letterman
- The Late Late Show with Craig Ferguson
- Up to the Minute

=== FOX ===
Returning series:

- Encore Programming

Not returning from 2009-10:

- Brothers (reruns)
- Sit Down, Shut Up
- The Wanda Sykes Show

=== NBC ===
Returning series

- Early Today
- Last Call with Carson Daly
- Late Night with Jimmy Fallon
- Poker After Dark
- Saturday Night Live
- The Tonight Show with Jay Leno

Not returning from 2009-10:

- The Tonight Show with Conan O'Brien
