= Public Broadcast Laboratory =

- Genre: News magazine
- Created by: Fred W. Friendly
- Country of origin: United States
- Original language: English
- No. of seasons: 2
- No. of episodes: 53

Production
- Executive producer: Av Westin
- Production company: Public Broadcast Laboratory

Original release
- Network: NET
- Release: November 5, 1967 – May 25, 1969

The Public Broadcast Laboratory (PBL) was a television program broadcast in the United States, created on November 5, 1967, by National Educational Television (NET). The program was considered a live Sunday-night magazine program. In 1969, the Ford Foundation withdrew support and the series was cancelled.

== History ==
The Public Broadcasting Laboratory was established by the Ford Foundation, which put over $292 million into educational television programs, including PBL. PBL was created to produce "an innovative two-hour Sunday night news program", and contained a program of news and other features, in something of what was at the time considered an experimental approach.

The program was conceived by Fred W. Friendly, former president of CBS News who appointed his CBS protege, Av Westin to head the project and be the executive director.

The initial PBL program featured African Americans with white-painted faces in a one-hour drama. Only 89 of a hoped-for 119 stations aired the debut program. The entire state educational networks of South Carolina and Georgia refused due to the controversial content; both states were embroiled then with social conflict over the Civil Rights Movement.

"Birth and Death," its Season 2 premiere which aired on 1 December 1968, was featured in an article in the 13 December 1968 issue of LIFE.

The series aired 53 episodes (including four specials) during its two-year run on NET. Season-one episodes ran two hours long, season-two episodes from December 1 of 1968 onward ran only 90 minutes long; the program ended its run at the conclusion of the television season. The entire archive of PBL programs was donated by NET's successor, PBS, to the Library of Congress on January 5, 1994.

PBL was not a success, but it did influence the commercial networks. For example, CBS borrowed the format for its famous news-magazine 60 Minutes. NBC's First Tuesday, which later became Chronolog and then Weekend was also influenced by PBL.

Episodes of PBL have been contributed to, and made available in, the American Archive of Public Broadcasting by the Library of Congress, GBH, and WNET.
