= We're Going to Make You a Star =

1975 book by Sally Quinn

- First edition
- Author: Sally Quinn
- Language: English
- Genre: Biography
- Published: 1975 (Simon & Schuster)
- Publication place: United States
- Media type: Print (hardcover)
- Pages: 256
- ISBN: 0-671-22084-5
- OCLC: 1324461
- Dewey Decimal: 070'.92'4
- LC Class: PN4874.Q5 A35

We're Going To Make You a Star is a 1975 book by Sally Quinn detailing her brief time with the CBS Morning News. In this book, she discusses the CBS failure and reflects on her adolescence and how it, among other things, led to her failure as a television news anchor.

== Contents ==
Sally Quinn grew up a general's daughter. She was acquainted with many diplomats and obtained a string of odd jobs around Washington, D.C. until she settled as a society reporter for the Washington Post. Quinn became notorious for her tough reviews. This is where the book begins but the real story is addressed after she is offered an anchor job for the CBS Morning News. She describes how reluctant she was about taking the job alongside Hughes Rudd and goes on to chronicle the failure of the show.

Quinn disclaims any responsibility for being unprepared and blames CBS for all that went wrong during the short life of this incarnation of the CBS Morning News. Scattered among the accounts of the broadcasting field Quinn offers an account of her personal relationships with big names such as Fred Friendly and Walter Cronkite.

== Critical reception ==
Kirkus Reviews panned We're Going To Make You a Star, saying the book was "embarrassing to read".
