= 2008–09 United States network television schedule (late night) =

The 2008–09 network late night television schedule for the four major English-language commercial broadcast networks in the United States cover the late night hours from September 2008 to August 2009. The schedule is followed by a list per network of returning series, new series, and series canceled after the 2007-08 television season.

== Legend ==
- Light blue indicates local programming.
- Gray indicates encore programming.
- Yellow indicates late night talk or variety shows.
- Gold indicates network news programming.

== Schedule ==
=== Monday-Friday ===
Network		11:00 p.m.	11:35 p.m.	12:00 a.m.	12:30 a.m.	1:00 a.m.	1:30 a.m.	2:00 a.m.	2:30 a.m.	3:00 a.m.	3:30 a.m.	4:00 a.m.	4:30 a.m.	5:00 a.m.	5:30 a.m.
ABC		Local programming	Nightline	Jimmy Kimmel Live! (12:05 a.m.)		Local programming		ABC World News Now						America This Morning	
CBS		Local programming	Late Show with David Letterman		The Late Late Show with Craig Ferguson (12:35 a.m.)		Local programming	Up to the Minute						CBS Morning News	
NBC	Fall	Local programming	The Tonight Show with Jay Leno		Late Night with Conan O'Brien		Last Call with Carson Daly	Poker After Dark		The Tonight Show with Jay Leno (R)		Local programming	Early Today	Local programming	
NBC	Spring	Local programming	The Tonight Show with Jay Leno		Late Night with Jimmy Fallon		Last Call with Carson Daly	Poker After Dark		Late Night with Jimmy Fallon (R)		Local programming	Early Today	Local programming	
NBC	Summer	Local programming	The Tonight Show with Conan O'Brien		Late Night with Jimmy Fallon		Last Call with Carson Daly	Poker After Dark		Late Night with Jimmy Fallon (R)		Local programming	Early Today	Local programming	

Note: The Tonight Show with Jay Leno ended its first run on May 29, 2009, with The Tonight Show with Conan O'Brien premiering on June 1, 2009.
Note: Late Night with Conan O'Brien ended on February 20, 2009, with Late Night with Jimmy Fallon premiering on March 2, 2009.

=== Saturday ===
Network		11:00 p.m.	11:30 p.m.	12:00 a.m.	12:30 a.m.	1:00 a.m.	1:30 a.m.
Fox	Fall	MADtv		Talkshow with Spike Feresten	Local programming		
Fox	Winter	Talkshow with Spike Feresten		MADtv (R)	Local programming		
Fox	Spring	MADtv		Talkshow with Spike Feresten		Local programming	
NBC		Local programming	Saturday Night Live			Local programming (1:02)	

== By network ==
=== ABC ===
Returning series

- Jimmy Kimmel Live!
- Nightline

=== CBS ===
Returning series

- Late Show with David Letterman
- The Late Late Show with Craig Ferguson

=== Fox ===
Returning series

- MADtv
- Talkshow with Spike Feresten

=== NBC ===
Returning series

- Last Call with Carson Daly
- Late Night with Conan O'Brien
- Saturday Night Live
- The Tonight Show with Jay Leno

New series

- The Tonight Show with Conan O'Brien
- Late Night with Jimmy Fallon
