= Snippet =

A snippet is defined as a small piece of something; it may in more specific contexts refer to:

- Sampling (music), the use of a short phrase of a recording as an element in a new piece of music
- Snipets, [sic] a series of short TV interstitials produced by Kaiser Broadcasting and Field Communications in the 1970s and early 1980s
- Snippet (programming), a short reusable piece of computer source code
- "Snippet", a song by Blonde Redhead from Blonde Redhead
