= Victoria Corderi =

American journalist

- Born: 1957 (age 68–69); United States
- Education: St. Bonaventure University (BA)
- Occupation: Journalist
- Employer(s): NBC News (formerly CBS News, WABC-TV, The Miami News)
- Notable work: Correspondent for Dateline NBC, 48 Hours, Street Stories
- Spouse: Yes
- Children: 4
- Awards: Three national news Emmy Awards; George Foster Peabody Award; Edward R. Murrow Award (1997); Las Primeras Award; Gerald Loeb Award

Victoria Corderi (born 1957) is an American journalist and recipient of three national news Emmys and a George Foster Peabody Award for Excellence in Journalism. She is also a 1997 recipient of the Edward R. Murrow Award for investigative journalism.

== Early life ==
Corderi, who is Cuban-American, graduated from St. Bonaventure University in 1979 with a Bachelor of Arts in journalism. She is married and has four children.

== Career ==
Corderi was a reporter with The Miami News, a defunct afternoon newspaper. She then began as a reporter for WPLG-TV in Miami in 1982.

Corderi covered the 1985 8.0 magnitude earthquake in Chile for CBS News. At CBS, she served as a correspondent for the news magazines 48 Hours and Street Stories and as news anchor for the CBS Morning News, as well as anchoring CBS Newsbreaks in between programming.

In September 1992, Corderi was hired by WABC-TV as a reporter and anchor. Her primary responsibility was serving as the co-anchor for the station's new midday newscast, pairing her with either of the two morning news anchors at the time, Edye Tarbox and Tim Fleischer. Corderi left after eighteen months.

Corderi was employed at NBC News starting in 1994 as a correspondent for Dateline NBC, initially under a novel job-sharing arrangement with fellow reporter Lisa Rudolph.

Corderi is a recipient of the Las Primeras Award for being one of the first Hispanic network anchors. She is listed in Who's Who Among Hispanic Americans. She is also a recipient of the Gerald Loeb Award bestowed by the UCLA Anderson School of Management. She has received three national news Emmys and a George Foster Peabody Award for Excellence in Journalism. She is also a 1997 recipient of the Edward R. Murrow Award for investigative journalism.
