= David S. Prowitt =

David S. Prowitt (May 29, 1934 - April 12, 2008) was a broadcast television producer and writer during the mid twentieth century. During his career he helped to develop and manage much of the science broadcasting for WNET-TV, PBS during the 1960s-1980s and worked on the shows The Killers, and The Thin Edge. He also produced the documentary news series Bill Moyers' Journal (1972-).

== Biography ==
Prowitt was born on May 29, 1934. He went to the University of Chicago and the Sorbonne. Prowitt began his career in 1952 working for the Chicago Sun-Times as a reporter and photograph editor. He also worked in public relations for American Airlines and later for ABC News and ABC television as a producer. In 1964, Prowitt developed, produced, wrote, and served as correspondent for WNET's first science series, Spectrum (broadcast nationally over NET member stations, some (like KCET) of which originated several episodes), and became the executive producer for WNET. He moved to Washington, D.C., in 1971 where he became a news correspondent and eventually WNET-TV Program Division Washington Bureau Chief. It was here that he wrote and produced several other shows including Bill Moyers' Journal, This Week with Bill Moyers, The Killers, The Thin Edge, made-for-TV movie The Pentagon Papers, and Baryshnikov: Live at Wolf Trap. Prowitt received the American Psychological Foundation's National Media Award in the television-radio-movie category in 1971 as the producer and narrator of the film The Mind of Man.

From 1973 to 1983, David Prowitt served as CEO and chairman of the board at Science Program Group, Inc. which promoted and supported science TV programming production. He left in 1983 to start his own science programming production company.

Prowitt died at age 73 in Virginia of a respiratory disease.
