= Mary Jo West =

American TV news anchor (born 1948)

Mary Jo West (born 1948) is an American retired television news anchor who primarily worked in the Phoenix, Arizona, market. She was the second-full time female anchor in Phoenix, working at KOOL-TV from 1976 to 1982. She then anchored the network newscast CBS News Nightwatch from 1982 to 1983 before returning to Phoenix, this time at KTVK. After leaving television news in 1986, she became a spokeswoman and communications director.

== Early life ==
West was born in College Park, Georgia, where she sang in her hometown's Baptist church choir. West won a voice scholarship to Florida State University's music school. She was cast in a production of Li'l Abner, which performed with the United Service Organizations in 1968. West later won the Miss Atlanta pageant. After deciding she did not want to be in music education, she took a year off from college and decided to transfer to the University of Georgia, where she graduated with a journalism degree in 1973.

== Journalism career ==
West started her television career in Tallahassee, Florida, first as a reporter for WCTV and later as a producer and host of a women's show on public station WFSU-TV. She moved to Phoenix in 1975, initially as a producer and host at KAET.

In 1976, West began working at KOOL-TV (channel 10), Phoenix's CBS affiliate. Her first years in the position were difficult. She was teamed with news director Bill Close, a fixture of Phoenix broadcasting. Close was unhappy to work with a woman and even called her "Betty Jo" at one point, even though he had hired West in the first place because he thought the station needed a female anchor. West also received hate mail from viewers, one of whom urged the "blonde tomato" to "go home and cook dinner for her husband".

On the evening of May 28, 1982, West anchored the news from the station's newsroom while Close and another KOOL employee were being held hostage in their studio for nearly five hours. That year, she also portrayed Maria in the Phoenix Theatre's production of The Sound of Music, helping earn record-breaking funding to save the company.

West worked to cover issues on substantive topics that did not always receive media attention. She was the first woman to go to the Arizona State Prison Complex – Florence as she interviewed inmates for a documentary on sexual assault, winning a Rocky Mountain Emmy Award.

In December 1982, West moved to New York to work as an anchor for CBS News Nightwatch, a new national overnight newscast; even though he was in the process of selling the station, KOOL-TV owner Tom Chauncey helped her secure an interview with CBS News executive Van Gordon Sauter. By that time, all of the major Phoenix TV stations had female co-anchors. The experience was not all West had hoped for, and she soon soured on network newscasting and living in New York. In a 1984 interview, she said,

To me, network was like Santa Claus is to a little child. One day, the child wakes up and finds out that Santa is just a man dressed in a red suit and a beard. Well, one day I woke up and I realized, network just wasn't that terrific. I put the network on a pedestal and I found out it was just composed of ordinary folks.

She decided to return to local news and—after negotiating with stations in Minneapolis, Atlanta and Los Angeles—returned to Phoenix, this time at KTVK (channel 3), the city's third-rated news station. She debuted at KTVK on September 20, 1983, serving as the lone anchor of the station's 6 p.m. and 10 p.m. newscasts until a co-anchor joined in early 1984. In spite of having attracted an anchor who led the ratings at KOOL, KTVK failed to see increases in viewership for its newscasts and faced attacks from the media. During this time, West married Richard Mahoney, a college professor.

== Public relations career ==
In 1986, West left KTVK. She followed Mahoney as he worked on Gary Hart's presidential campaign and founded a communications company, which closed in 1989 when she was hired to run the city of Phoenix's government-access channel. That same year, West and Mahoney divorced, sharing custody of their adopted daughter Molly. She also hosted a weekly health series for KTVK in 1993.

After stints with Big Brothers/Big Sisters of Arizona and the city of Phoenix in the early 2000s, she became the spokeswoman for the Roman Catholic Diocese of Phoenix. She later was the spokeswoman for the Bashas' supermarket chain and communications director for Arizona First Things First, as well as St. Vincent de Paul. In retirement, she works at Phoenix Sky Harbor International Airport.

Throughout her career and private life, West supported mental health, receiving recognition for promoting awareness. She spoke about her personal experiences on The Oprah Winfrey Show. Tipper Gore, hearing her talk at Northern Arizona University, invited her to participate at the White House Conference on Mental Health.

In 2022, the Mary Jo West Excellence in Communication Scholarship was established at Coconino Community College, with preference given to a Native American female.

== Awards ==
- 2018: Arizona Women's Hall of Fame
- 1994: Dr. Martin Luther King Living the Dream Award, City of Phoenix for advocacy on behalf of the mentally ill
- 1979: Peabody Award, The Long Eyes of Kitt Peak (narrator)
- Two Rocky Mountain Emmy Awards
- Gracie Allen Award
- 13 Arizona Press Club awards
- Arizona Broadcasters' Hall of Fame
