= Melissa McDermott =

Melissa McDermott is a former reporter for CBS News. She is best known for being an anchor of the overnight CBS newscast, Up to the Minute.

== Biography ==
Melissa McDermott is the daughter of Country Music Disc Jockey's Hall of Fame member and longtime Wichita, Kansas media personality "Ol' Mike" Oatman. She graduated from the University of Kansas with a B.S. degree in broadcast news from the William Allen White School of Journalism and received her master's degree in Psychology from Pace University in New York. She worked as the 6 p.m. and 10 p.m. anchor at KAYS-TV (now KBSH) in Hays, Kansas.

She worked at KSNW-TV in Wichita, Kansas, initially going by the name of Melissa Beck. She and her ex-husband, Todd McDermott, were named co-anchors at KSNW.

McDermott later worked as 6 p.m. anchor and won several awards as an investigative reporter at WJLA-TV in Washington, DC.

From 2000 through March, 2006, Melissa McDermott anchored CBS's overnight newscast, Up to the Minute.

McDermott now lives in the New York City area and is working on a number of documentaries. She has two children. Melissa worked as a clinician at St Christopher.inc in Dobbs Ferry NY, and helping at-risk youth and their families prepare for their lives ahead.

== Accomplishments ==
Melissa McDermott has covered presidential campaigns, the Oklahoma City bombing, and other events. She has received many awards; including a national and two regional Edward R. Murrow awards, the SPJ Dateline Award, three Heartland Emmy Awards, an Ohio State Award, a National AP Award, a National Iris Award, and an Emmy Award.

Media offices
Preceded by Mika Brzezinski	CBS News: Up to the Minute anchor 2000–2006	Succeeded by Meg Oliver
