= Monica Gayle =

American television news anchor (retired)

Monica Gayle is a retired television news anchor who anchored the 5, 6, 10pm news on Detroit's Fox O&O WJBK, from 1997 to 2022. She previously worked with CBS News, anchoring the news programs Up to the Minute from April 1992 to 1993, the CBS Morning News from August 1993 to May 1994, and with Seattle TV station KSTW during its stint as a CBS station from 1995 to 1997. Her career began after graduating from Washington State University at KULR-TV Channel 8 in Billings, Montana (then an ABC affiliate, now NBC) as a weekend anchor/weekday general assignment reporter working with weekend sports/weather anchor David Smock.
