= Troy Roberts (journalist) =

News reporter and correspondent for 48 Hours Mystery

- Born: September 9, 1962 (age 62); Philadelphia, Pennsylvania
- Education: University of California, Berkeley
- Occupation(s): News anchor, reporter, correspondent of 48 Hours Mystery
- Notable credit: Emmy Award

Troy Roberts (born September 9, 1962) is an American television news reporter and correspondent for 48 Hours Mystery.

== Biography ==
Roberts was born on September 9, 1962, in Philadelphia, Pennsylvania. He graduated from University of California, Berkeley, with a bachelor's degree in Political Science in 1984. Roberts lives in New York City.

== Career ==
From 1985 to 1987, Roberts worked as a host and producer of a weekly newsmagazine show at KPIX-TV, a San Francisco-based, CBS-owned television company. From 1987 to 1990, he was a reporter for Portland-based KATU-TV. In 1990, he moved to New York to work at CBS-owned station WCBS-TV, reporting for Channel 2's This Morning and anchoring local news segments for CBS Morning News. In 1993, he joined CBS News to co-anchor the overnight broadcast of Up to the Minute, interviewing various newsmakers and personalities. From 1995 through 1996, Roberts co-anchored CBS Morning News.

Roberts was most recently a correspondent for 48 Hours and had been in this role with CBS since 1998. He has earned an Alfred I. DuPont-Columbia Award and two Emmy awards. He was awarded his first Emmy for coverage of the 1996 Olympic Summer Games in Atlanta and the bombing that occurred during the event. In 2013, he distinguished himself with his Emmy winning report on the manhunt and capture of the Boston Marathon bombing suspects. Roberts was also part of the team coverage of the Newtown, Conn., elementary school shooting which earned CBS News a 2014 DuPont-Columbia award.

At CBS News, he served as a correspondent for the CBS Evening News, CBS News Sunday Morning and CBS This Morning. Roberts has been an alternate news reader for CBS This Morning and substitute anchor for the networks weekend editions of CBS Evening News. He also anchored the true crime series Hard Evidence.

In 2015, Roberts created and co-executive produced the OWN network documentary Sag Harbor, a look inside one of America's more exclusive and historically significant African-American beach community in New York's The Hamptons. In 2017, Roberts joined NBC Universal where he has worked as an NBC special correspondent for Dateline. He is the anchor of the Oxygen series Killer Motive.

== Personal life ==
He was inspired to adopt a child after he covered the story of a girl who was returned by her adoptive family.
