= Anne-Marie Green =

Canadian journalist

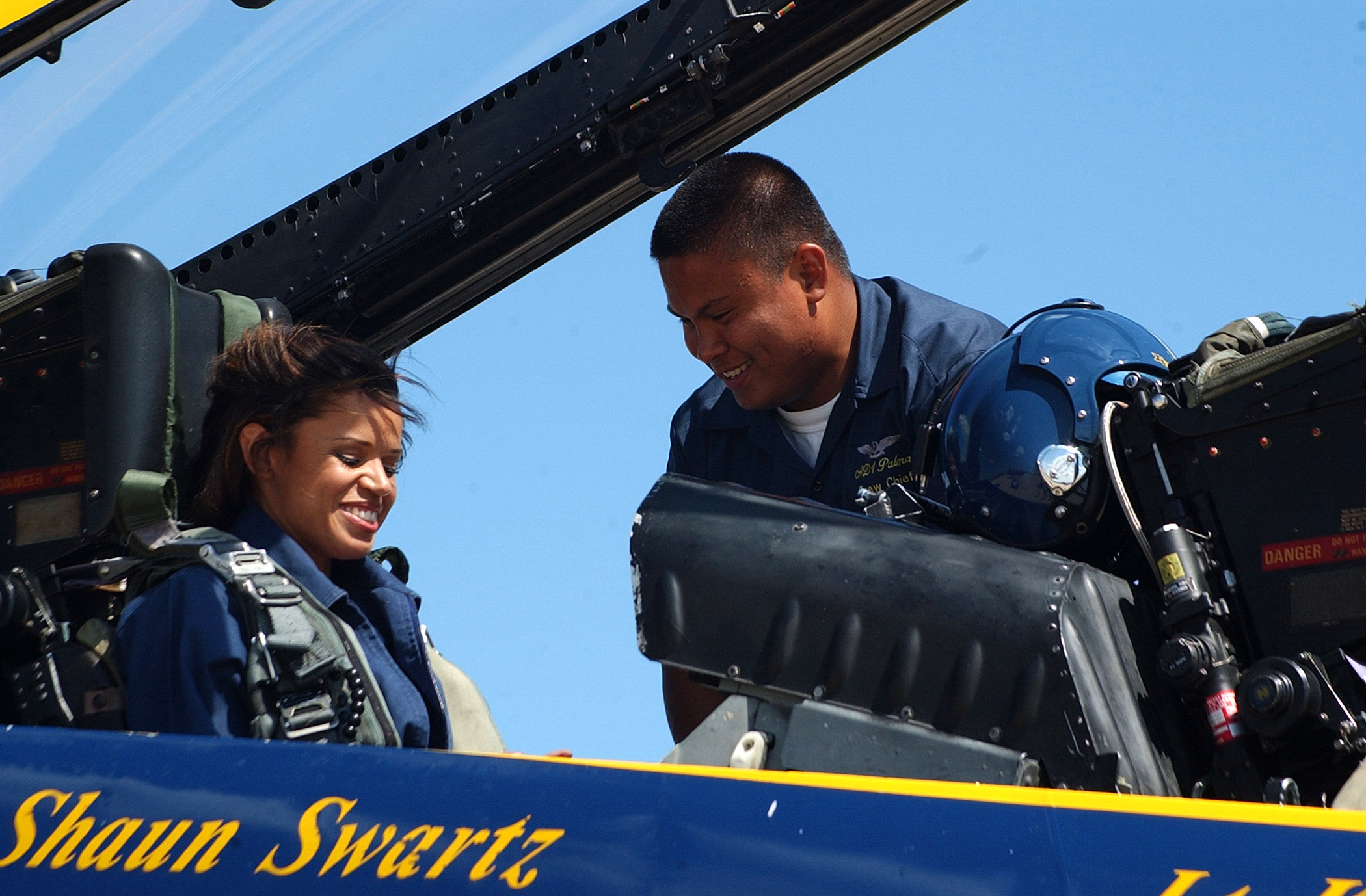
- Green prepares for flight with Blue Angels in 2006
- Born: September 21, 1971 (age 55); Ontario, Canada
- Occupations: Journalist, correspondent
- Notable credit(s): Up to the Minute (Main anchor); Morning News (Main anchor); 48 Hours (Correspondent)
- Spouse: Algernong Allen
- Children: Ailey Lynn Allen

Anne-Marie Green (born September 21, 1971) is a Canadian journalist who is a correspondent for the CBS News program 48 Hours.

Green began her career as a reporter for CKVR-TV in Barrie and at Rogers Cable News in Mississauga, both located in Ontario. She was a news anchor in Toronto beginning in June 2001 with CITY-TV and also anchored at CablePulse 24, a 24-hour cable news channel servicing the greater Toronto area.

Green joined KYW-TV (CBS 3) in October 2004 as a general assignment reporter and also a co-anchor for Sunday morning newscasts alongside Ben Simoneau.

In October 2012, she became a substitute anchor for CBS News' overnight show, Up to the Minute (later the CBS Overnight News, and now CBS News Roundup). She was subsequently named the anchor of the CBS Morning News (later renamed CBS News Mornings) effective January 21, 2013. Green also served as morning anchor for CBSN, later renamed CBS News 24/7. Green left CBS News Mornings and her anchoring roles on CBS News 24/7 on October 4, 2024 to join 48 Hours.

== Personal ==
A Toronto native, Green earned a Bachelor of Arts degree in English from the University of Toronto and has a graduate degree in journalism from Humber College.

== See also ==
- New Yorkers in journalism
