= Harold Dow =

American news correspondent and journalist

- Born: September 28, 1947; Hackensack, New Jersey, U.S.
- Died: August 21, 2010 (aged 62); Ridgewood, New Jersey, U.S.
- Education: University of Nebraska at Omaha
- Occupations: Journalist, correspondent, investigative reporter
- Years active: 1972−2010
- Title: Correspondent, 48 Hours Mystery
- Spouse: Kathleen Dow
- Children: 3

Harold Dow (September 28, 1947 – August 21, 2010) was an American television news correspondent, journalist, and investigative journalist with CBS News.

== Early life and career ==
Dow was born in Hackensack, New Jersey. He attended the University of Nebraska at Omaha. He was a member of Kappa Alpha Psi fraternity.

Dow became co-anchor and talk-show host for KETV in Omaha, Nebraska, making him the first Black American television reporter. Dow had also been an anchor and reporter at Theta Cable TV in Santa Monica, California and news anchor for WPAT Radio in Paterson, New Jersey. Dow was a co-anchor for the CBS overnight news program CBS News Nightwatch (1982–1983), a correspondent for the CBS News magazine Street Stories (1992–93) and had reported for the CBS Evening News and CBS News Sunday Morning since the early 1970s.

Dow joined CBS News in 1972, first as a broadcast associate then as correspondent with their Los Angeles Bureau while at KCOP-TV.

== Personal life ==
Harold Dow married Kathleen (Starks) Dow in 1980. They had three children together.

== Death ==
A resident of Upper Saddle River, New Jersey, Dow died from complications of asthma on August 21, 2010 behind the wheel of his car.
