= National Educational Television =

Former American television network

- NET logo from April 1960 to November 1964 and again from June 1967 to October 4, 1970
- Country: United States
- Headquarters: New York City, U.S.

Programming
- Picture format: 480i SDTV

Ownership
- Owner: Ford Foundation (1954–1970); Corporation for Public Broadcasting (1967–1970)

History
- Founded: November 21, 1952; 73 years ago
- Launched: May 16, 1954; 72 years ago (as a network)
- Closed: October 4, 1970; 56 years ago (16 years, 4 months and 18 days)
- Replaced by: Public Broadcasting Service (PBS)
- Former names: Educational Television and Radio Center; National Educational Television and Radio Center

National Educational Television (NET) was an American educational broadcast television network owned by the Ford Foundation and later co-owned by the Corporation for Public Broadcasting. It operated from May 16, 1954, to October 4, 1970, and was succeeded by the Public Broadcasting Service (PBS), which has memberships with several television stations that were formerly part of NET.

The Council on Library and Information Resources (CLIR) provided funds for cataloging the NET collection, and as part of an on-going preservation effort with the Library of Congress, over 10,000 digitized television programs from the non-commercial TV stations, and producers spanning about 20 years from 1952 to 1972 have been contributed to the American Archive of Public Broadcasting.

== History ==
External videos
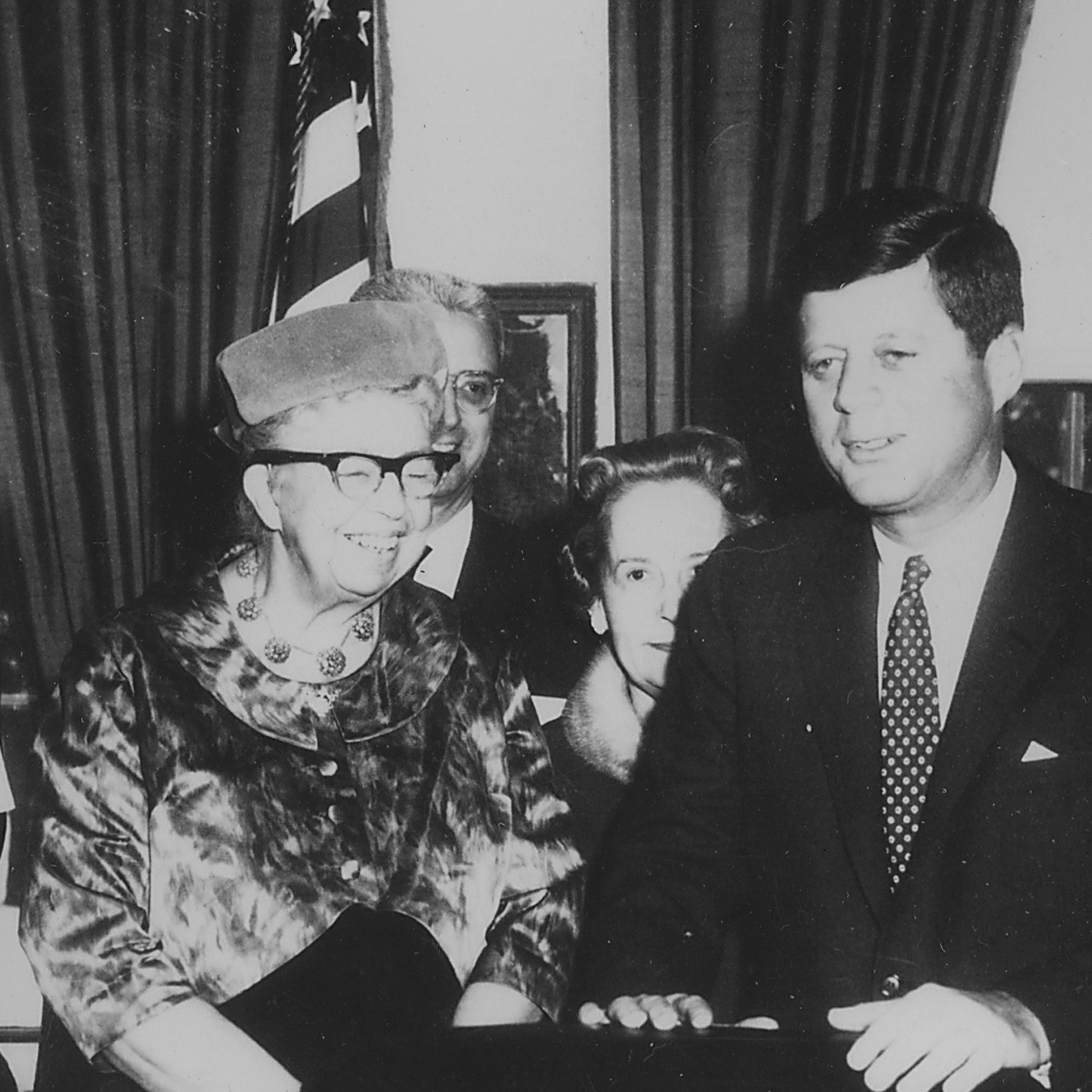
- Prospects of Mankind with Eleanor Roosevelt; What Status For Women?, 59:07, 1962. Eleanor Roosevelt, chair of the Presidential Commission on the Status of Women, interviews President John F. Kennedy, Secretary of Labor Arthur Goldberg and others, Open Vault from WGBH

The network was founded as the Educational Television and Radio Center (ETRC) in November 1952 by a grant from the Ford Foundation's Fund for Adult Education (FAE). It was originally a limited service for exchanging and distributing educational television programs produced by local television stations to other stations; it did not produce any material by itself.

In the spring of 1954, ETRC moved its operations to Ann Arbor, Michigan, and on May 16 of that year, it began operating as a "network". It put together a weekly five-hour package of television programs, distributing them primarily on kinescope film to the affiliated stations by mail. By 1956, ETRC had 22 affiliated stations, expected to grow to 26 by March 1957. The programming was noted for treating subjects in depth, including hour-long interviews with people of literary and historical importance. The programming was also noted for being dry and academic, with little consideration given to entertainment value, a marked contrast to commercial television. Many of the shows were designed as adult education, and ETRC was nicknamed the "University of the Air" (or, less kindly, "The Bicycle Network": a reference to both its low budget and its distribution model of sending physical copies of its films and videotapes to affiliate stations through the mail, a practice known in the television industry as "bicycling").

The center's headquarters moved from Ann Arbor to New York City in 1958, and the organization became known as the National Educational Television and Radio Center (NETRC). The center became more aggressive at this time, increasing its programming output to ten hours a week in an effort to ascend to the role of the U.S.' fourth television network. As the NETRC did not have centralized production facilities or staff of its own, the vast majority of its programs were either produced by the affiliate stations themselves, contracted from independent filmmakers, or — beginning in 1961 with the BBC-produced serial An Age of Kings — imported from various foreign countries such as Canada, the United Kingdom, Australia, France, Italy, and even the USSR and elsewhere in the Eastern Bloc.

Starting from 1962, the federal government took over the FAE's grants-in-aid program through the Education Television Facilities Act.

In November 1963 NETRC changed its name to National Educational Television, and spun off its radio assets. Under the centerpiece program NET Journal, which began airing in the fall of 1966, NET began to air controversial, hard-hitting documentaries that explored numerous social issues of the day such as poverty and racism. While praised by critics, some affiliates, especially those in politically and culturally conservative markets, objected to the perceived liberal slant of the programming. Another NET produced program begun in 1967, Public Broadcast Laboratory, generated similar complaints.

In 1966, NET's position as a combined network and production center came into question when President Lyndon Johnson arranged for the Carnegie Foundation to conduct a study on the future of educational television. The Carnegie Commission released its report in 1967, recommending educational television be transformed into "public television". The new organization would be controlled by the nonprofit Corporation for Public Broadcasting (a corporation established by the federal government) and receive funding from the government and other sources. Under this plan, funds were to be distributed to individual stations and independent production centers – which is what NET would have been reduced to. The Ford Foundation, interested Educational Television Stations, and President Johnson supported the recommendations of the Carnegie Commission in the Public Broadcasting Act, which was signed into law on November 7, 1967.

Logo from 1954 until 1955

Logo from November 1964 to June 1967

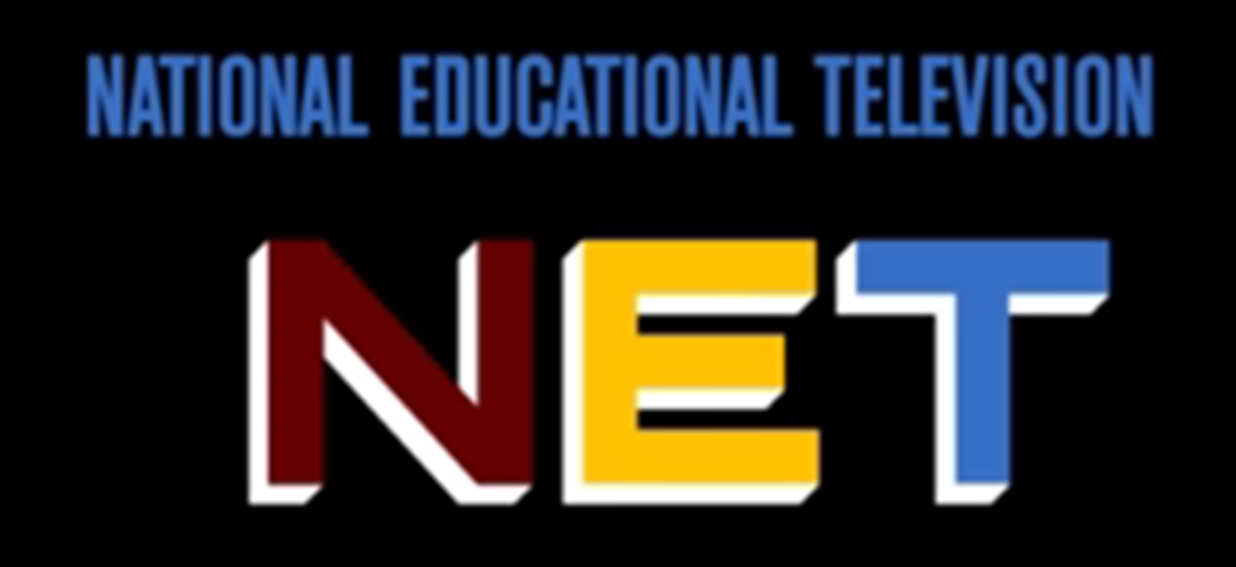
One of NET's last on-screen identification bumpers calling it "National Educational Television" (from 1968); by then, it was referred to as "the public television network", and the full name was no longer seen there.

The color NET logo was incorporated into a model building at the beginning and end of Mister Rogers' Neighborhood episodes on February 10, 1969. The NET "building" was later remodeled as a brick building with windows, but kept the lopsided roof that was part of the NET logo.

=== Replacement by PBS ===
The Public Broadcasting Service (PBS) began as an entity in November 1969, with NET continuing to produce many programs and to be the name of the network. NET's production of NET Journal and Public Broadcast Laboratory continued to be liabilities amid accusations of partisanship funded by the government. Eventually, Ford and the CPB decided to shut NET down, to be replaced by PBS as the network distributing programming to stations, but, unlike NET, it was not directly involved in production matters, which had been perceived as the main source of the controversies surrounding NET. Instead, local stations and outside suppliers would provide programming for the system, a model that endures to this day with PBS. In early 1970, both Ford and the CPB threatened to cut NET's funding unless NET merged its operations with New York City-area affiliate WNDT. NET agreed to do so.

WNDT's call sign was changed to WNET on October 1, 1970, as the station and NET's merger was completed. On October 5, PBS began network broadcasting. NET ceased to operate as a network from that point, although some NET-branded programming, such as NET Journal and NET Playhouse remained part of the PBS schedule (now produced by WNET) until the brand was retired two years later. Some of the programs that began their runs on NET, such as Washington Week and formerly Sesame Street (now airing on both PBS and global streamer Netflix after WBD-owned premium channel HBO's rights were officially expired) continue to air on PBS currently.

== See also ==
- List of PBS logos
- List of United States over-the-air television networks
- Public Broadcast Laboratory
