= John Hart (journalist) =

American journalist (born 1932)

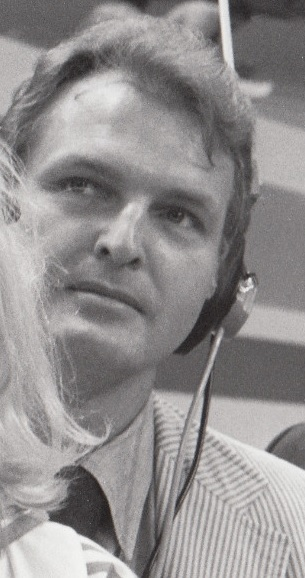
- Hart at the 1976 Democratic National Convention
- Born: February 1, 1932 (age 94); Denver, Colorado
- Occupation: Journalist
- Years active: 1956-1991

John Hart (born February 1, 1932) is a retired American television journalist who worked for several different television networks during the 1960s through the 1990s.

== Career ==
First known to the American public as a correspondent for CBS News, Hart eventually became anchor of CBS Morning News program, broadcast from 1969 until 1973. Hart moved to NBC in 1975 where, in addition to general correspondent duties, he served as a substitute for John Chancellor as anchor of NBC Nightly News and anchor of NBC Nightly News weekend editions during much of the 1970s. He stayed with that network until 1988, when The Christian Science Monitor hired him as anchor of its cable television newscast, World Monitor, which aired on The Discovery Channel 1988–1991. He retired in 1991.

Among Hart's awards were Peabody, Overseas Press Club, Weintal, Edward R. Murrow, Christopher, ACE, Emmy.

He received a B.A. degree from Westmont College in Santa Barbara, California, in 1953. From 1954 to 1956 he served in the U.S. Army. From 1956 to 1960 he worked at WCCO-TV in Minneapolis; WSJV in Elkhart, Indiana; and KPOL radio in Los Angeles. While there he received his M.A. degree in journalism from UCLA (1959).

From 1960 to 1964 he was a writer/reporter for KNXT in Los Angeles. In 1964 he became bureau manager and correspondent of the CBS-owned television station news bureau in Washington, D.C. During 1965–1966 he covered the South for CBS News, followed by a six-month assignment in Vietnam. During 1968 he covered the presidential campaigns of Robert Kennedy and Richard Nixon.

Hart joined NBC News as a political correspondent in February 1975, serving in the Washington, D.C. bureau. In January 1977 he became the national affairs correspondent. In November 1979 he was named chief European correspondent, based in London. That month he interviewed Ayatollah Ruhollah Khomeini of Iran.
