= WWSM =

- Annville-Cleona, Pennsylvania; United States
- Frequency: 1510 kHz

Programming
- Format: Defunct

Ownership
- Owner: Patrick H. Sickafus AKA Pat Garrett

History
- First air date: August 4, 1968; 57 years ago
- Last air date: July 2022; 3 years ago
- Former call signs: WAHT (1968–1993)

Technical information
- Facility ID: 54343
- Class: D
- Power: 5,000 watts day
- Transmitter coordinates: 40°17′44.00″N 76°27′46.00″W

WWSM (1510 AM) was a daytime-only radio station. Licensed to Annville-Cleona, Pennsylvania, United States, the station was owned by Patrick H. Sickafus and, until July 2022, aired a classic country format and featured programming from USA Radio Network and Westwood One.

In July 2022, WWSM ceased operations. The Federal Communications Commission cancelled the station's license on November 7, 2022, for failing to file an application for renewal.
