= Hughes Rudd =

American journalist

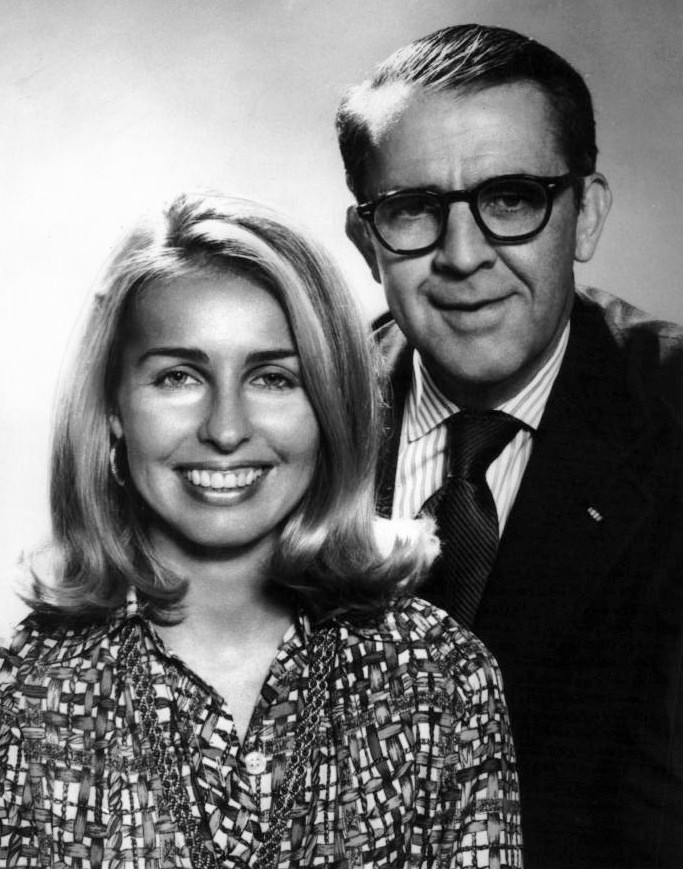
Rudd with Sally Quinn, 1973.

Hughes Day Rudd (September 14, 1921 in Waco, Texas – October 13, 1992 in Toulouse, France) was a television journalist and CBS News and ABC News correspondent. Rudd was known for his folksy style, gravelly voice, and unimposing sense of humor, often ending his newscasts with human interest stories that sometimes made him break into a chuckle on camera.

== Known life and career ==
=== College years and wartime Army service ===
Rudd attended the University of Missouri from 1938 to 1941 where he was a member of the Missouri Alpha chapter of Sigma Alpha Epsilon before enlisting in the U.S. Army during World War II. Flying Piper Cubs as an artillery spotter pilot in Africa and Europe, Rudd earned a Purple Heart, six Air Medals and a Silver Star.

=== News career ===
==== Print journalism beginnings ====
Following World War II, Rudd began his journalism career writing for several newspapers, including the Kansas City Star, the Minneapolis Tribune and the Rock Springs (Wyo.) Daily Rocket and Sunday Miner.

==== Television news career ====
Rudd got his first position at CBS News as a writer through the influence of his friend Walter Cronkite. Rudd reported from around the world, including tours as a correspondent in Bonn, Berlin, and Moscow. He was an anchor of the CBS Morning News from 1973 to 1977 when the CBS morning news program was more of a news summary similar to the format of The CBS Evening News with Walter Cronkite. At times, Rudd was paired with various other CBS anchors, including, briefly in 1973, Sally Quinn, and later, Bruce Morton and Richard Threlkeld, the latter two based in Washington.

In the middle of 1979, Rudd was recruited to ABC News by Roone Arledge. Human-interest stories, especially humorous or touching show-ender stories, became his hallmark. One of his assignments was as announcer for ABC's Wide World of Sports.

=== Later years and death ===
Always a Francophile, after his retirement from journalism in 1986, Rudd moved to Valence-d'Albigeois in the department of the Tarn in southwestern France with his wife, Ann.

Rudd's book, My Escape From the C.I.A. and Other Improbable Events, a collection of quasi-autobiographical fiction, was published in 1966 by E. P. Dutton & Company.

On October 13, 1992, Rudd died of an aneurysm at a hospital in Toulouse, at the age of 71. His remains were cremated, and as he was a World War II Army veteran, his ashes were buried at Arlington National Cemetery.

=== News honors ===
The journalism awards that Rudd won included a George Foster Peabody Award for his creative writing on the CBS Morning News in 1977.
