= Av Westin =

American television producer and director (1929–2022)

Avram Westin (July 29, 1929 – March 12, 2022) was an American television producer. Westin began his career as a copy boy at CBS Radio News in 1947. He moved to CBS Television News in 1953, where he went on to co-create the CBS Morning News with Mike Wallace. He then went to ABC where he produced World News Tonight and then 20/20. Westin died on March 12, 2022, at the age of 92.
