= Bruce Morton (journalist) =

American journalist

- Born: Bruce Alexander Morton; October 28, 1930; Norwalk, Connecticut, U.S.
- Died: September 5, 2014 (aged 83); Washington D.C., U.S.
- Education: Harvard University
- Presenting career
- Show: CBS Morning News
- Station: CBS News
- Network: CNN
- Style: Television news correspondent
- Country: USA

Bruce Alexander Morton (October 28, 1930 – September 5, 2014) was an American television news correspondent for both CBS News and CNN in a career which spanned over 40 years.

Morton was born in Norwalk, Connecticut, but grew up in Chicago. He graduated from Harvard University in 1952 and spent the next three years in the U.S. Army. While still at Harvard, he was a newscaster for a Boston radio station. After leaving the service, Morton went into television news, first as a behind-the-scenes assistant at New York City's WRCA-TV, then on air for a local station in Pittsburgh. He joined ABC News in 1962 as a London-based reporter. In 1964, he joined CBS News, where he would stay for the next 29 years. He was based in Washington, D.C., where he was a Congressional correspondent. During his tenure with CBS, he also co-anchored the CBS Morning News (with Hughes Rudd) from 1974 to 1977. Rudd and Morton were awarded a Peabody Award in 1976. Longtime CBS correspondent Roger Mudd, in his 2008 memoir The Place To Be, acknowledged Morton as the best writer in the CBS Washington Bureau during the years they worked together.

After leaving CBS in 1993, Morton went to work for CNN, where he stayed until his retirement in 2006. Continuing to be based in Washington, his title at CNN was national correspondent.

He died on September 5, 2014, aged 83, at his home in Washington D.C.
