= Sally Quinn =

American journalist (born 1941)

- Quinn in 2026
- Born: July 1, 1941 (age 85); Savannah, Georgia, U.S.
- Education: Smith College
- Occupations: Author, journalist
- Spouse: Ben Bradlee (m. 1978; died 2014)
- Children: Quinn Bradlee
- Parent(s): William Wilson Quinn; Sara Bette Williams

Sally Sterling Quinn (born July 1, 1941) is an American author and journalist. For a time, she wrote about religion for a blog at The Washington Post.

== Early life ==
Sally Quinn was born in Savannah, Georgia, to Lt. General William Wilson "Buffalo Bill" Quinn (November 1, 1907 – September 11, 2000) and Sara Bette Williams (January 27, 1918 – September 26, 2004). Both are buried at Arlington National Cemetery. Quinn has two siblings—Donna of Oakland, California, and William Jr. of Phoenix, Arizona.

Her father was an infantry officer who also served as an intelligence officer and played a key role in the transition of the United States intelligence service from the Office of Strategic Services (OSS) to the Central Intelligence Agency (CIA). As a US Army colonel in World War II, he helped coordinate the invasion of southern France in 1944 and captured Hermann Göring. Though he was not present, his regiment liberated Dachau concentration camp; he arrived the next day when he heard the news. From 1964 to 1966, he commanded the Seventh Army in Germany. Quinn wrote about his career in an autobiography, Buffalo Bill Remembers.

Quinn attended and graduated from Smith College in 1963.

For many years, the Quinns lived on Connecticut Avenue N.W., Washington, D.C., where her mother, Bette Quinn was known for cooking and entertaining. Sally Quinn reported in CC Goldwater's HBO film Mr. Conservative that Senator Barry Goldwater spent much time with the Quinns, often staying at their home since his wife decided to remain in Arizona rather than D.C. while Congress was in session.

== Career ==
=== Newspaper journalism ===
Quinn began at The Washington Post with minimal experience, and was reportedly called by Ben Bradlee after a report of her pajama party in celebration of the election to Congress of Barry Goldwater Jr. The job interview included the following exchange.

"Can you show me something you've written?" asked Managing Editor Benjamin Bradlee. "I've never written anything," admitted Quinn. Pause. "Well," said Bradlee, "nobody's perfect." (A profile in Vanity Fair attributes the "Nobody's perfect" line to editorial-page editor Philip L. Geyelin.)

A notable incident of her career was her claim that Zbigniew Brzezinski, then the National Security Advisor, jokingly opened his fly in front of a reporter, a claim the Post retracted the following day.

Quinn was critical of President Bill Clinton during the impeachment trial, stating that he had "fouled the nest". In 1993, First Lady Hillary Clinton declined a party invitation from Quinn, which was perceived as a snub. Regarding Whitewater Independent Counsel Ken Starr, Quinn wrote: "Similarly, independent counsel Ken Starr is not seen by many Washington insiders as an out-of-control prudish crusader. Starr is a Washington insider, too. He has lived and worked here for years. He had a reputation as a fair and honest judge. He has many friends in both parties. Their wives are friendly with one another and their children go to the same schools." Harry Jaffe wrote in Salon that Quinn's condemnation of Bill Clinton's adultery rang hollow coming from someone who broke up the marriage of her boss Ben Bradlee before going on to marry Bradlee herself.

External videos
- Q&A interview with Quinn on the "OnFaith" blog, September 28, 2014, C-SPAN

On February 19, 2010, The Washington Post published "Sally Quinn's The Party: No 'dueling' Bradlee weddings, just scheduling mistake", in print and online. The column alluded to Bradlee's family dysfunction and discussed her son's wedding, which Quinn scheduled on the same day as the wedding of her husband's granddaughter. The column was considered inappropriate, and reader backlash was immediate, criticizing Quinn for airing family laundry and Washington Post editors for printing it. By February 24, the Post canceled her column, which had been appearing in the religion section of the print edition. This was Quinn's last column for the printed newspaper. Quinn continued to write for the Post's OnFaith blog, at least through 2015. Quinn remains listed as a contributor.

=== Television journalism ===
In August 1973, Quinn joined CBS News reporter Hughes Rudd as co-anchor of the CBS Morning News. Ninety minutes before her television debut on August 6, 1973, Quinn collapsed while trying to fight the flu. Quinn's ad-libs during the show's first week were deemed inappropriate—in one episode, following a report on the children of California migrant farm workers, she quipped about child labor being nothing more "vexing" than having to clean her room for 30 minutes as a child. Quinn left the CBS Morning News after the February 1, 1974, telecast. Quinn chronicled her short television career in the book We're Going to Make You a Star.

== Personal life ==
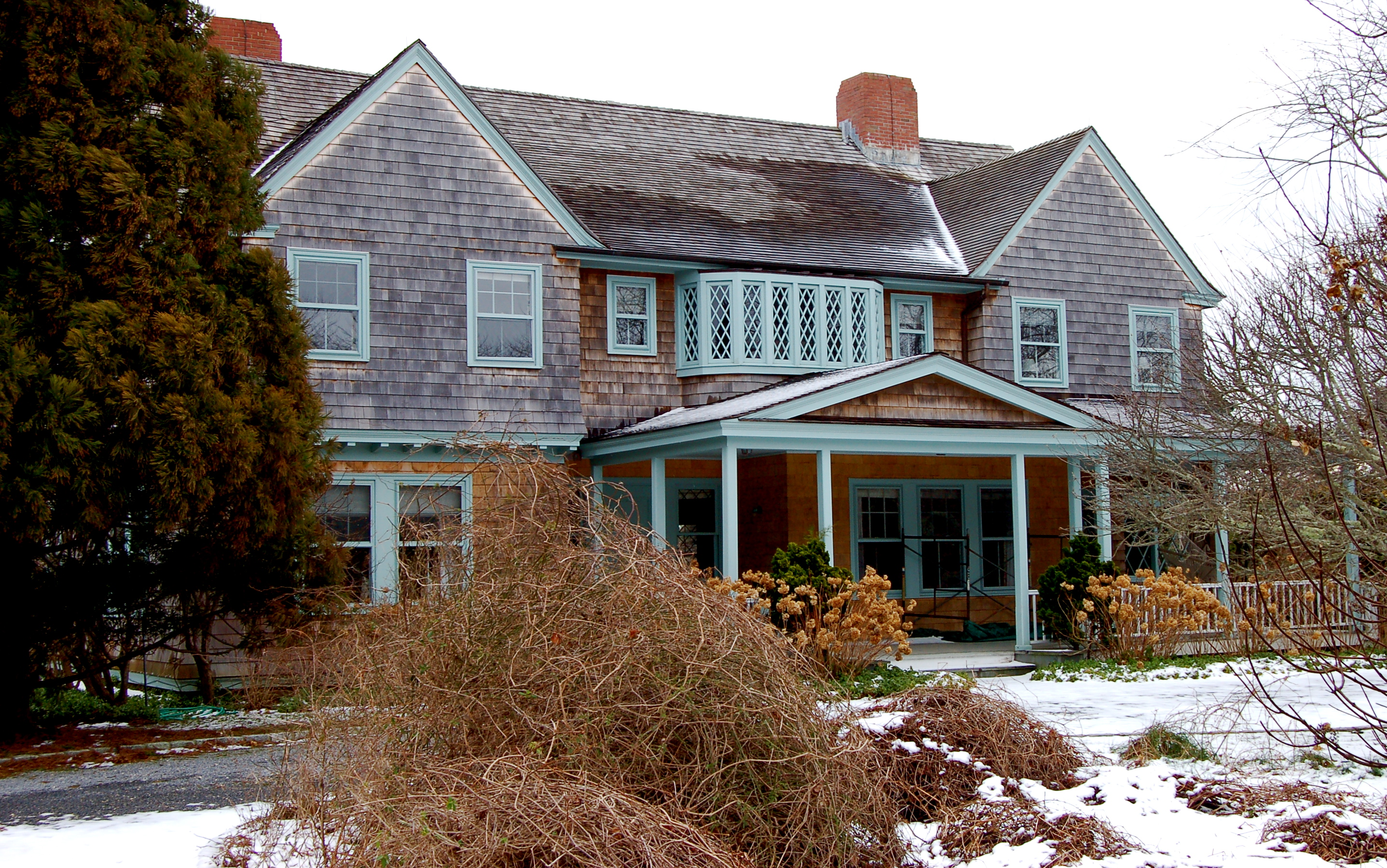
Grey Gardens, in January 2009

Quinn was the third wife of Ben Bradlee, her former boss at The Washington Post until he died in 2014. They married on October 20, 1978. In 1979, Quinn and Bradlee purchased Grey Gardens in East Hampton, New York from Edith Bouvier Beale, known as "Little Edie," for $220,000 (equivalent to $976,000 in 2025) under the terms they were not to tear down the house. Little Edie told them "All it needs is a coat of paint!" The couple then spent several years remodeling the home and fully restoring it. In February 2017, Quinn put Grey Gardens on the market and sold it for $15.5 million on December 20, 2017.

Quinn and Bradlee had one child, Quinn Bradlee, born in 1982. Their son was born when Quinn was 41 and Bradlee was 61. In 2009, they appeared with Quinn on the Charlie Rose show on PBS and spoke of Quinn being born with velo-cardio-facial syndrome, also known as 22q11.2 deletion and Shprintzen syndrome (named after Dr. Robert Shprintzen who first identified the disorder in 1978 and who also diagnosed Bradlee). Quinn wrote of her son's learning disabilities and attendance at special schools in a 2006 blog article, "What My Son Taught Me About God."

External videos
- Presentation by Quinn on Finding Magic, October 10, 2017, C-SPAN

In 2017, Quinn published a book entitled Finding Magic in which she described herself as a Christian who also believes in the occult and the power of magic. Quinn recalled growing up in a family of Scottish origin which practiced voodoo. Quinn remembered her mother putting hexes on two people who later died. Quinn further described performing hex magic herself on three people, two of whom died shortly after.

=== Other ===
In addition to her newspaper and television journalism, Quinn served as social secretary for Cherif Guellal.

Quinn had a cameo role in Born Yesterday, the 1993 remake of the 1950 romantic comedy. Quinn was the subject of six portraits made by American artist Andy Warhol. She was known as a famous hostess in the 1970s and 1980s, which was commented on in the play The City of Conversation.

== Books ==
External videos
- Booknotes interview with Quinn on The Party: A Guide to Adventurous Entertaining, December 28, 1997, C-SPAN

- The Party: A Guide to Adventurous Entertaining. New York: Simon & Schuster, 1997.
- We're Going to Make You a Star. New York: Simon & Schuster, 1975.
- Finding Magic: A Spiritual Memoir., HarperOne, 2017.
- Regrets Only, New York: Simon & Schuster, 1986.
- Happy Endings, New York: Simon & Schuster, 1991.
