= Richard Threlkeld =

American television news correspondent

- Born: November 30, 1937; Cedar Rapids, Iowa, US
- Died: January 13, 2012 (aged 74); Amagansett, New York, US
- Education: Ripon College

Richard Threlkeld (November 30, 1937 – January 13, 2012) was an American television news correspondent who spent 25 years with CBS News.

== Early life ==
Threlkeld was born in Cedar Rapids, Iowa, and grew up in Barrington, Illinois. He earned a degree in history and political science from Ripon College. He then earned a master's degree from Medill School of Journalism at Northwestern University.

== Career ==
Threlkeld held positions at WHAS-TV in Louisville, Kentucky, and WMT-TV in Cedar Rapids, Iowa. He joined CBS News in 1966 and served as a war correspondent in Vietnam in 1970. Threlkeld stayed with CBS until December 1981, serving as co-anchor of the CBS Morning News (with Lesley Stahl) from 1977 to 1979. He covered John Paul II's visit to Mexico in 1979.

Threlkeld went to ABC News in 1982 and was given the special assignment of filing a weekly Status Report segment for World News Tonight, which sought to give a deeper perspective to the week's most important story. In that role, he reported on the Falklands War, the invasion of Lebanon and many other domestic and international issues. Status Reports won a DuPont-Columbia Award in 1983.

After seven years at ABC, Threlkeld returned to CBS in 1989 and remained there until his retirement in 1999.

During his news career, Threlkeld also covered the Vietnam War, the Persian Gulf War, and the Tiananmen Square protests of 1989. In the United States he covered such stories as the Robert F. Kennedy assassination and the Patty Hearst kidnapping, as well as numerous political campaigns.

Threlkeld's last assignment before retirement was as CBS News Moscow correspondent.

Threlkeld authored the book Dispatches from the Former Evil Empire in 2001.

== Personal life ==
His wife, Betsy Aaron, was CNN Moscow correspondent at the same time. He and his wife retired to Tucson, Arizona.

== Death ==
Threlkeld was killed in an automobile accident on January 13, 2012, in Amagansett, New York. His 2008 Mini convertible collided with a propane truck. He was 74.
