= Snipets =

- Genre: Children's
- Country of origin: United States
- Original language: English

Production
- Running time: 30 seconds to 1 minute
- Production companies: Field Communications; Kaiser Broadcasting

Original release
- Release: 1972 – 1982

Snipets (/ˈsnɪpɪts/ SNIP-its) was a series of 30-second to one-minute-long short films for children which were produced by Kaiser Broadcasting, and later Field Communications. They ran on Kaiser/Field TV stations as interstitials and were also syndicated to additional stations in the U.S.

During its first year on the air, the theme song for Snipets was Popcorn by the band Hot Butter. Later, the opening was shortened to a card showing the word "SNIPETS" in plaid letters with a group of kids saying the name scattered (sounding like "sniiiiiiits"), and was later changed to five green worm looking things with faces appearing one at a time, then saying in perfect unison "snipets".

Approximately 100 Snipets were produced between 1972 and 1978. They aired until approximately sometime in 1982 on Field Communications Stations and held on for a few more years in sporadic showings on other non-Field Stations.

Many of the more memorable ones are as follows:

-"Come Back Here Can", which showed kids how they could take a coffee can and a rubber band and create a toy that would roll back to them when pushed.

-"Buzzsaw", which teaches kids how to create a buzzsaw-like toy using string and some light wood.

-"Now!", which features a kid doing his homework, and many distractions coming up to him (glass of milk, ball, and glove, TV, radio, telephone, etc.), and him shooing them away until he's done, upon which he asks the viewer, "Did you do your homework yet? I have." then announces, "Okay! NOW!" to which everything comes back up to him.

-"The Metric System", three separate skits teaching kids how to use the metric system for temperature, length, and weight. (Created during the 1970s failed attempt to convert the United States to metric.)

-"Smile Gangs", a clip in an inner city neighborhood show a group of four kids walking together who come across another group of four kids. They briefly have a standoff, before they start smiling at one another, then all run off together. The skit ends with a voiceover saying, "Smiles are friend-makers."

-"Girls Can't Play Basketball", three boys shooting hoops are joined by a girl who would like to play, but one boy initially rebuffs her, but had really no excuse as to why he thinks girls wouldn't play basketball, and after she and him both make and miss a shot, he gives in and allows her to play with them.

-"Bad For You", features a green gruff man sitting in a chair eating candy, cakes, chips, and other things not considered good for you, and dismissing the advice people give to eat better foods. As he eats and rants, he visibly gets fatter and melts but stays in denial all the way to the end.

-"'Good For You' Foods", another skit about eating right showing proper foods, like meat, fish, fruits, and veggies as anamorphic athletes, while other foods, like soda pop, candy, and other snacks show way less athleticism. The voice-over ends with, "Next time you eat, eat to win!"
