= CBS News Roundup =

American overnight television news program

- Also known as: CBS News Nightwatch (1982–1992); Up to the Minute (1992–2015); CBS Overnight News (2015–2024); CBS News Roundup (2024–present)
- Genre: Overnight news program
- Directed by: Alfonso Casciello James McGrath
- Presented by: Jessi Mitchell (2025–present)
- Opening theme: "CBS News Theme" by Antfood
- Country of origin: United States
- Original language: English
- No. of seasons: 23

Production
- Executive producer: Kevin Rochford
- Producer: Matt McGarry Nick Kasanzew
- Production locations: New York City (1982–1984; 1992–2019; 2024–present Weekday Edition, 2019–2024 Monday Edition); Washington, D.C. (1984–1992 Weekday Edition, 2019–2024 Tuesday–Friday Edition)
- Editor: Lorenzo Piccolo
- Camera setup: Multi-camera
- Running time: 60 minutes (aired in tape-delayed loop)
- Production company: CBS News

Original release
- Network: CBS
- Release: October 4, 1982 – present

Related
- CBS Evening News; CBS News Mornings; CBS Mornings

CBS News Roundup is an American overnight news program broadcast by CBS. Airing during the early morning hours each Monday through Friday, the program is anchored by Jessi Mitchell.

CBS has carried an overnight news block since 1982; it was known as CBS News Nightwatch until 1992 and then Up to the Minute until September 18, 2015. From then through May 28, 2024, Up to the Minute was replaced by the CBS Overnight News, which eschewed a dedicated anchor by largely repackaging segments from the CBS Evening News and other CBS News programming. On May 29, 2024, it was replaced by the CBS News 24/7-produced CBS News Roundup.

== Overview ==
CBS News Roundup airs at 1:00 a.m. ET on CBS News 24/7, and is offered on the CBS broadcast network in a loop from 2:00 a.m. ET to 8:00 a.m. ET (when CBS News Mornings – the network's early-morning news program – begins in certain areas of the Pacific Time Zone. Most CBS stations air CBS News Mornings at 4:00 a.m. local time or earlier, depending on the start time of the station's local morning show). Most of the network's stations do not air the program's entire broadcast loop and preempt portions of it to air local programming (usually infomercials or syndicated) – joining the program in progress anywhere from five minutes to as much as 1½ hours after the start of the program – with affiliates looping the show until CBS News Mornings begins. Some stations and affiliates, including CBS Television Stations, carry a rebroadcast of the CBS Evening News in the first half-hour they air or leading into their morning newscasts (except Sunday into Monday morning, when—except for KCNC—Face the Nation is substituted).

Its main competitor is ABC's World News Now, which follows a more irreverent format than the more straightforward news style of CBS (NBC has not aired a late-night newscast since the cancellation of NBC Nightside in 1998, and locally scheduled syndicated programming or NBC News Now's Top Story with Tom Llamas leads into Early Today).

== History ==
Former "Up to the Minute" title card.

The program's history traces back to the launch of the network's first overnight news program, CBS News Nightwatch, which premiered after midnight in the early hours of Monday, October 4, 1982 at 2:00 in the morning EDT That program was originally anchored by Christopher Glenn, Felicia Jeter, Karen Stone and Harold Dow, who were later joined by Mary Jo West. In 1984, production of Nightwatch moved from New York City to Washington, D.C., at which time Charlie Rose (who later returned to CBS News as co-anchor of CBS This Morning) and Lark McCarthy became the program's anchors. Nightwatch's format was a hybrid of a traditional newscast and an interview and debate show; during the original 1982 format, local affiliates had the option of inserting local news updates into the program.

=== Up to the Minute ===
CBS announced its decision to cancel CBS News Nightwatch in early 1992. Around this time, ABC and NBC were setting up their late-night newscast programs (World News Now and NBC Nightside, respectively; only World News Now is still on the air) and replaced it with a more traditional news program in the same vein as the other two, titled Up to the Minute, on March 30, 1992. The program was originally anchored by Russ Mitchell and Monica Gayle, who both left the program in 1993 (Gayle subsequently became co-anchor of the CBS Morning News), and were replaced by Troy Roberts, at which point the program switched to the single-anchor format which it used for the rest of its run; production of the newscast returned to the CBS Broadcast Center in New York, situated in front of a working newsroom used by the affiliate news service CBS Newspath. Regular on-air contributors to Up to the Minute included John Quain, who served as the program's technology consultant beginning in 1998.

The program's on-air graphics package and set were often several years behind that of CBS News' daytime broadcasts, with components of the news division's early-1990s era graphics package being used on the program until 2005, when it began to follow the current look of the CBS Evening News. In March 2009, when Michelle Gielan was named anchor of Up to the Minute, production of the program was integrated with the CBS Morning News, with the same anchors being used on both programs.

In November 2012, Up to the Minute moved to Studio 57 at the CBS Broadcast Center, the same studio space that was also home to CBS This Morning. At that time, it became the last remaining news program on any of the big three networks or major cable news channels to begin broadcasting in high-definition (by comparison, the CBS Morning News had upgraded to HD two years earlier in November 2010).

=== CBS Overnight News ===
On June 25, 2015, Newsday reported that CBS News had decided to cancel Up to the Minute but planned on retaining the 3 a.m. timeslot for news programming. Up to the Minute ended its run after 23 years on September 18, 2015. The program was replaced three days later on September 21 by the CBS Overnight News. In terms of content, the show was largely unchanged from its predecessor, except it no longer had a dedicated anchor. Much of the program now consisted of repackaged segments from the CBS Evening News, introduced by its anchor using footage from the earlier broadcast. Other segments were linked by CBS News correspondents in secondary studios.

=== CBS News Roundup ===
In April 2024, alongside the announced rebranding of the CBS News streaming network as CBS News 24/7, CBS announced a new late-night newscast known as the CBS News Roundup, which would premiere in June, and air on the service at 1:00 a.m. ET/10 p.m. PT. The title is familiar to CBS News Radio listeners from its long-running daily morning newscast, the CBS World News Roundup, which ran from 1938 until the radio network's closure in 2026.

The Roundup premiered on May 29, 2024, also replacing the CBS Overnight News on the main network. When it debuted, Matt Pieper hosted on Mondays, and Shanelle Kaul for the remainder of the week. Since February 27, 2025, Jessi Mitchell has hosted every weekday. It is broadcast from Studio 57 at the CBS Broadcast Center, which had been the main home of the CBS News streaming network since 2022.

== Anchors ==
- Christopher Glenn (1982–1984)
- Felicia Jeter (1982–1984)
- Karen Stone (1982–1984)
- Harold Dow (1982–1984)
- Mary Jo West (1982–1983)
- Charlie Rose (1984–1990)
- Lark McCarthy (1984–1990)
- Various hosts (1990–1992)
- Russ Mitchell (March 30, 1992 – 1993)
- Monica Gayle (1992–1993)
- Troy Roberts (1993–1995)
- Sharyl Attkisson (1993–1995)
- Nanette Hansen (1995–1998)
- Mika Brzezinski (1997–2000; now with MSNBC)
- Melissa McDermott (2000 – March 10, 2006)
- Meg Oliver (March 20, 2006 – March 20, 2009)
- Michelle Gielan (March 23, 2009 – June 18, 2010)
- Betty Nguyen (June 21, 2010 – April 6, 2012)
- Terrell Brown (April 9, 2012 – January 18, 2013; now with WLS-TV in Chicago)
- Anne-Marie Green (January 21, 2013 – September 18, 2015)
- Jeff Glor (September 21, 2015 – May 2, 2016; December 5, 2017 – May 10, 2019)
- Scott Pelley (September 22, 2015 – June 16, 2017)
- Elaine Quijano (May 9, 2016 – June 1, 2020)
- Anthony Mason (June 20, 2017 – December 1, 2017)
- Norah O'Donnell (July 16, 2019 – May 28, 2024)
- Jericka Duncan (December 7, 2020 – May 27, 2024)
- Shanelle Kaul (May 29, 2024 – February 26, 2025)
- Matt Pieper (June 3, 2024 – February 26, 2025)
- Jessi Mitchell (February 27, 2025 – present)

== See also ==
- CBS Weekend News, another CBS network newscast produced by CBS News 24/7
