= CBS News Mornings =

American early-morning news program

- Also known as: CBS Early Morning News (1982–1987); CBS Morning News (1987–2024); CBS News Mornings (2024–present)
- Genre: Early-morning news program
- Presented by: Michael George; Errol Barnett
- Theme music composer: Rick Patterson, Ron Walz & Neal Fox (1991–2006); James Horner (2006–2011); James Trivers, Elizabeth Myers & Alan James Pasqua (2011–2016); Joel Beckerman (2016–2021); Antfood (2021–present)
- Opening theme: "CBS News Theme," by Trivers-Myers Music (2011–2015) "CBS This Morning Theme" (2015–2021) "Abblasen" (2021–present)
- Country of origin: United States
- Original language: English

Production
- Executive producer: Shawna Thomas
- Camera setup: Multi-camera
- Running time: approx. 23 minutes

Original release
- Network: CBS
- Release: October 4, 1982 – present

Related
- CBS Evening News; CBS News Roundup; CBS Mornings

CBS News Mornings (formerly CBS Morning News) is an American early-morning news broadcast presented weekdays on the CBS television network. The program features late-breaking news stories, national weather forecasts and sports highlights. Since October 7, 2024, the program has been anchored by Michael George and Errol Barnett on CBS News 24/7.

The program is broadcast live at 4:00 a.m. Eastern Time, preceding local news beginning at 4:30 a.m. on many CBS stations. It is transmitted in a continuous half-hour broadcast delay loop until 10:00 a.m. Eastern Time, when CBS Mornings begin in the Pacific Time Zone. In the few markets where the station does not produce a morning newscast, it may air in a two- to three-hour loop immediately before the start of CBS Mornings. Some CBS stations (such as WAKA in Montgomery, Alabama and KWTV-DT in Oklahoma City, which still do not air it today at all) were forced to pre-empt the program when they implemented it less than two months earlier. The show is updated for any breaking news occurring before 7:00 a.m. Eastern Time, while stations throughout the network will join CBS Mornings in all time zones past that time at their local discretion or network orders for live coverage.

== History ==
=== Background ===
The CBS Morning News title was originally used as the name of a conventional morning news program that served as a predecessor to the network's current CBS Mornings. For most of the 1960s and 1970s, the program aired as a 60-minute hard news broadcast at 7:00 a.m., preceding Captain Kangaroo and airing opposite the first hour of NBC's Today. Walter Cronkite and sportscaster Jim McKay both anchored the original CBS Morning News at one time. Joseph Benti became the anchor in 1969. Other anchors of the broadcast in this format included John Hart, Hughes Rudd, Sally Quinn, Richard Threlkeld, Lesley Stahl and Bruce Morton.

=== CBS Early Morning News/current Morning News format ===
The program first aired in its current format on October 4, 1982 as the CBS Early Morning News. Beginning at 6:30 a.m., it was a half-hour extension of the two-hour CBS Morning News which aired from 7:00 to 9:00 directly opposite Today. Bill Kurtis and Diane Sawyer originally anchored both the Early Morning News and the Morning News of that era. Sawyer departed both programs in mid-1984, to be named a correspondent for 60 Minutes later that year. In her absence, Kurtis was joined by a rotating series of co-hosts, principally Maria Shriver, Meredith Vieira and Jane Wallace.

Kurtis anchored the Early Morning News solo until March 1985, while co-anchoring the Morning News with Phyllis George until July of that year. Faith Daniels took over and would remain on the anchor desk, most of the time sharing the role with Forrest Sawyer (July to December 1985 and January to September 1987) and later Douglas Edwards and Charles Osgood, until Daniels left CBS to become anchor of competing early-morning newscast NBC News at Sunrise in 1990. The program would drop "Early" from its title in January 1987, assuming the name previously used by the network's flagship morning broadcast, which had been cancelled and replaced by the critically panned news/entertainment/comedy show The Morning Program (which itself was cancelled after 10½ months in favor of the more traditional CBS This Morning); the renamed CBS Morning News also briefly expanded into a 90-minute broadcast (6:00 to 7:30 a.m. local), although affiliates in several larger markets chose to preempt all or part of the first hour to accommodate their local morning newscasts.

Osgood would remain anchor of the CBS Morning News until June 1992, paired with Victoria Corderi from 1990 to 1991, Giselle Fernández through February 1992, and then with Meredith Vieira for the remainder of Osgood's run as co-anchor. After Osgood left the program in 1992, the anchor turnover continued. The program continued to maintain a two-anchor format until Thalia Assuras was appointed as anchor of the CBS Morning News in 1998, at which point the program switched to a single-anchor format, which it has had ever since. In March 2009, when Michelle Gielan was named anchor of Up to the Minute, the CBS Morning News became integrated with the overnight news program, using the same anchors on both programs.

In November 2010, CBS Morning News became the third and final early morning news program to begin broadcasting in high-definition television; its counterpart, Up to the Minute, continued to be broadcast in standard-definition television until November 2012, when the program converted to high definition. In November 2012, production of the CBS Morning News and Up to the Minute relocated in the CBS Broadcast Center. The CBS Morning News moved to the studio of the CBS Evening News, and Up to the Minute was moved to the Studio 57 facility, the same studio where CBS This Morning was also broadcast, until its cancellation on September 18, 2015.

On September 21, 2015, the CBS Morning News relocated to the CBSN newsroom and adopted new graphics based on those of CBS This Morning (after having previously aligned itself with the branding of the CBS Evening News). Concurrently, Up to the Minute was replaced the same day by the CBS Overnight News.

On March 11, 2020, the CBS Broadcast Center was temporarily closed after a number of CBS News staffers tested positive for COVID-19. While CBS News did attempt to reopen the Broadcast Center with minimal crews following a thorough decontamination and cleaning, a second shutdown on March 18, along with directives by CBS News President Susan Zirinsky in the wake of the impact of the COVID-19 pandemic on television resulted in dramatic changes to many of CBS News's programs and operations. CBSN had itself experienced major issues in both producing a normal schedule, with its operations largely being outsourced temporarily to its CBS Television Stations, and with producing programs for CBS News.

While CBS News did attempt to produce the CBS Morning News with limited staff and graphics from its Washington, D.C. bureau the following week, it became impossible to consistently produce the program under their normal standards, and as a result production of the CBS Morning News was temporarily suspended beginning on March 24, 2020, with a repeat of the CBS Evening News or local newscasts or programming taking its place. On August 31, 2020, nearly six months after the pandemic began, production of the CBS Morning News resumed with its primary anchor, Anne-Marie Green, anchoring from her home studio.

On September 8, 2021, the CBS Morning News was updated to match the branding of CBS Mornings, which replaced CBS This Morning around the same time. On February 5, 2024, in conjunction with updated graphics adopted by CBS Mornings, the program was retitled CBS News Mornings; swapping names with the 7 a.m. ET show on CBS News 24/7.

== On-air staff ==
=== Current ===
- Michael George (October 7, 2024 – present)
- Errol Barnett (October 7, 2024 – present) CBS News 24/7 at 7 a.m.

=== Former ===
- Bill Kurtis (1982–1985; later at Decades)
- Diane Sawyer (1982–1984; now with ABC News)
- Maria Shriver (rotating co-anchor; 1984–1985; now with NBC News)
- Meredith Vieira (rotating co-anchor; 1984–1985; main anchor; 1992–1993; later host of Who Wants to Be a Millionaire (2002–2013), then host of The Meredith Vieira Show (2014–2016)); now at NBC News
- Jane Wallace (rotating co-anchor; 1984–1985)
- Faith Daniels (1985–1990; later with NBC as anchor of NBC News at Sunrise and host of A Closer Look with Faith Daniels)
- Forrest Sawyer (July–December 1985 and January–September 1987; now with Fox News)
- Douglas Edwards (1987) (deceased)
- Charles Osgood (1987–1992; later became host of CBS News Sunday Morning, deceased)
- Victoria Corderi (1990–1991)
- Giselle Fernández (1991–1992)
- John Roberts (1992–1994; now with Fox News)
- Monica Gayle (1993–1994; retired from WJBK in Detroit)
- Dana King (1994–1995; retired from KPIX-TV in San Francisco)
- Troy Roberts (1995–1996); still at CBS News
- Jane Robelot (1995–1996; now at WYFF-TV in Greenville, South Carolina)
- Kristin Jeannette-Meyers (1996–1997)
- Cynthia Bowers (1996–1998)
- Thalia Assuras (1998–1999)
- Julie Chen (1999–October 2002; remains with CBS as host of Big Brother)
- Susan McGinnis (October 2002–January 2008)
- Michelle Gielan (March 23, 2009 – June 18, 2010)
- Betty Nguyen (June 21, 2010 – April 6, 2012; now with WPIX in New York City)
- Terrell Brown (2012–2013; now with WLS-TV in Chicago)
- Anne-Marie Green (2013–2024, now with 48 Hours)
