= CBS News =

News division of the American television and radio service CBS

- Division of: CBS
- Key people: Tom Cibrowski (President)‍; Bari Weiss (Editor-in-chief)
- Founded: September 18, 1927; 99 years ago
- Headquarters: CBS Broadcast Center; 530 West 57th Street; New York City, New York 10019; U.S.
- Area served: Worldwide
- Television broadcast programs: CBS News Roundup; CBS News Mornings; CBS Mornings; CBS Evening News; CBS Saturday Morning; CBS Weekend News; 48 Hours; CBS News Sunday Morning; Face the Nation; 60 Minutes
- Parent: CBS Television Stations
- Official website: cbsnews.com
- Streaming news network: cbsnews.com/live
- Owner: Skydance

CBS News is the news division of the American television broadcaster CBS headquartered in New York City. Along with ABC News and NBC News, it has long been among the big three broadcast news networks in the United States.

CBS News emerged as a radio news broadcast service in 1929. In 1933, Paul W. White was named head of the news division and saw it through World War II where it expanded into Latin America, providing an alternative to Nazi propaganda with assistance from the Department of State. Its first television broadcasts began in 1941 with WCBW in New York City. In 1962, Walter Cronkite became anchor of its flagship television news program, the newly renamed to CBS Evening News.

CBS News television programs include CBS Evening News, CBS Mornings; news magazine programs CBS News Sunday Morning, 60 Minutes, and 48 Hours; and Sunday morning political affairs program Face the Nation. It also oversees CBS News podcasts like The Takeout Podcast. CBS News also operates CBS News 24/7, a 24-hour digital streaming channel.

== History ==
In 1929, the Columbia Broadcasting System began making regular radio news broadcasts, which were five-minute summaries taken from reports from United Press, one of the three wire services that supplied newspapers with national and international news. In December 1930, CBS chief William S. Paley hired journalist Paul W. White away from United Press as CBS's news editor. Paley put the radio network's news operation at the same level as entertainment, and authorized White to interrupt programming if events warranted. Along with other networks, CBS chafed at the breaking news embargo imposed upon radio by the wire services, which prevented them from using bulletins until they first appeared in print. CBS disregarded an embargo when it broke the story of the Lindbergh kidnapping in 1932, using live on-the-air reporting. Radio networks scooped print outlets with news of the 1932 presidential election.

In March 1933, White was named vice president and general manager in charge of news at CBS. As the first head of CBS News, he began to build an organization that soon established a legendary reputation.

In 1935, White hired Edward R. Murrow, and sent him to London in 1937 to run CBS Radio's European operation. White led a staff that would come to include Richard C. Hottelet, Charles Collingwood, William L. Shirer, Eric Sevareid, Bill Downs, John Charles Daly, Joseph C. Harsch, Cecil Brown, Elmer Davis, Quincy Howe, H. V. Kaltenborn, Robert Trout, and Lewis Shollenberger.

"CBS was getting its ducks in a row for the biggest news story in history, World War II", wrote radio historian John Dunning.

=== World War II ===
In 1940, William S. Paley recruited Edmund A. Chester from his position as Bureau Chief for Latin America at the Associated Press to coordinate the development of the international shortwave radio Network of the Americas, called La Cadena de las Américas, in 1942. Broadcasting in concert with the assistance of the Department of State, the Office for Inter-American Affairs chaired by Nelson Rockefeller and Voice of America as part of President Roosevelt's support for Pan-Americanism, this CBS radio network provided vital news and cultural programming throughout South America and Central America during the World War II era.

Through its operations in 20 nations, it fostered benevolent diplomatic relations between the United States and other nations in the region while providing an alternative to Nazi propaganda.

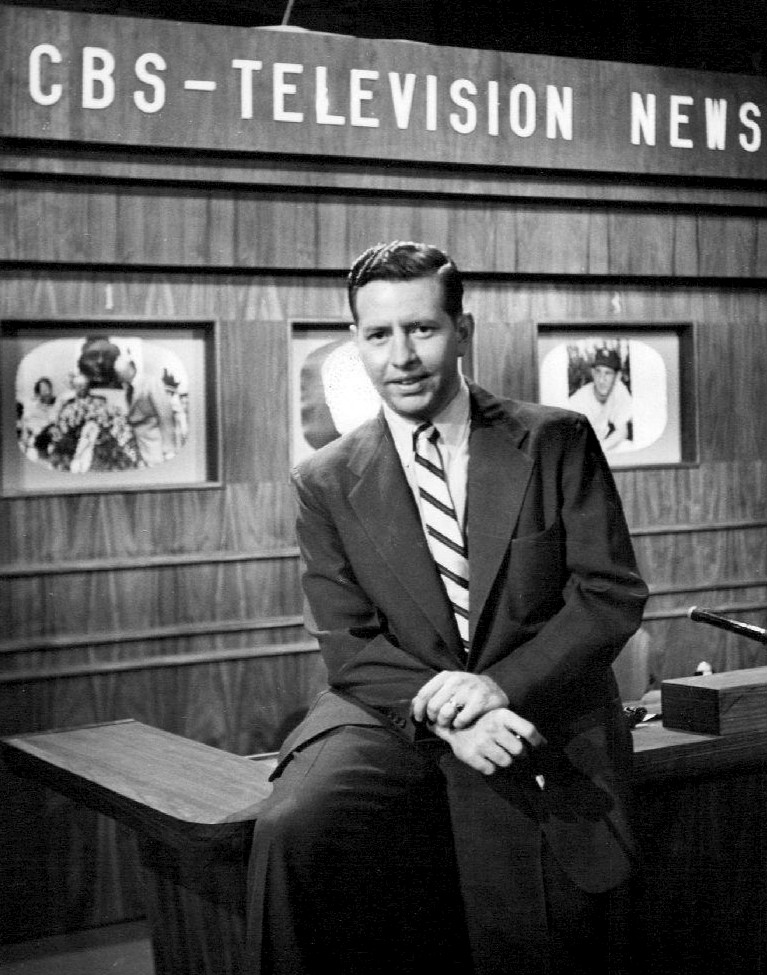
Douglas Edwards, who worked as a CBS News television and radio correspondent for four decades, on the CBS News set in 1952

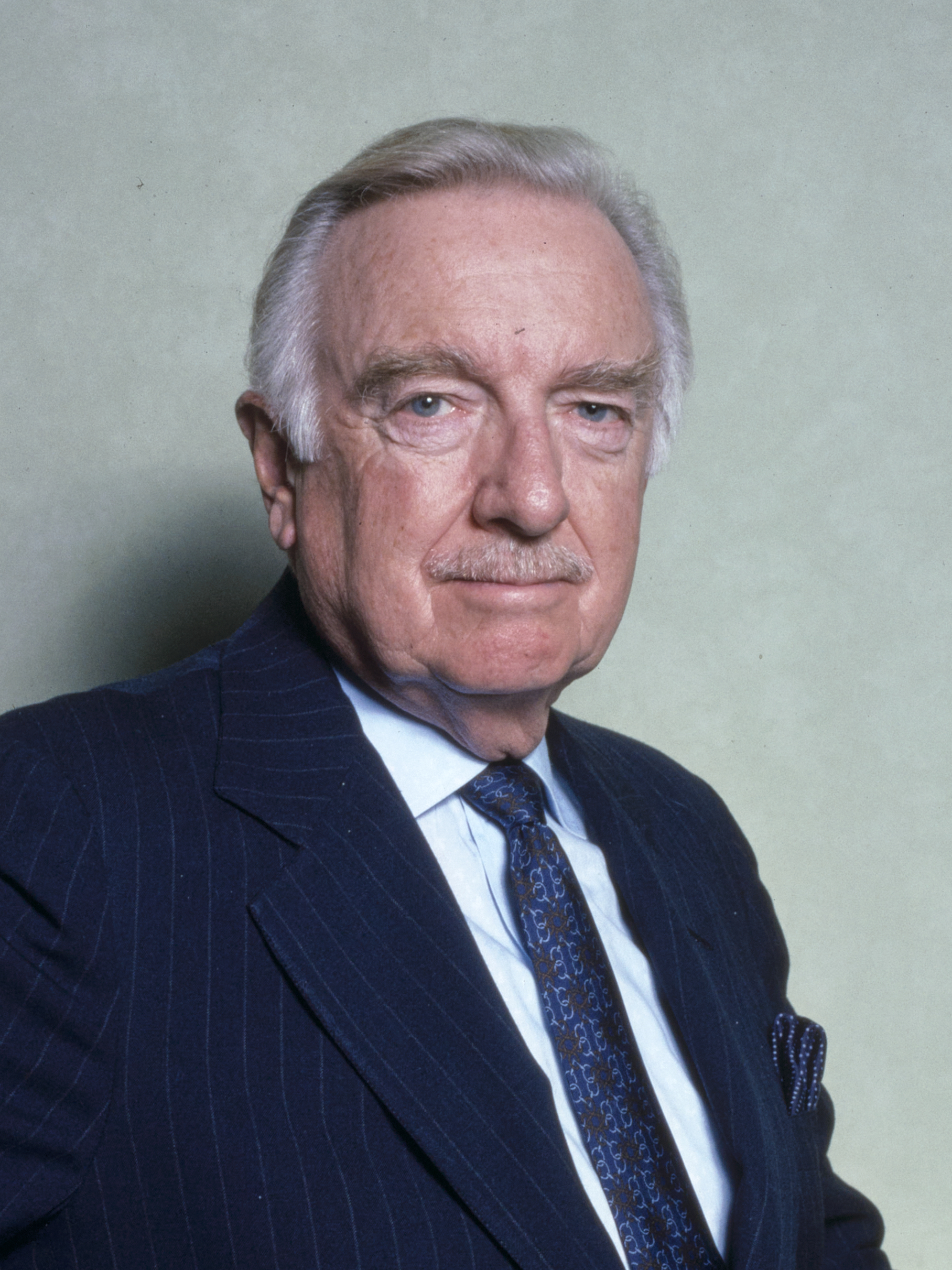
Walter Cronkite, who was anchor of CBS Evening News for nearly two decades, from 1962 to 1981

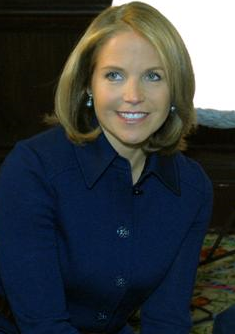
Katie Couric, the first solo female anchor of a major evening news program, served as anchor and managing editor of CBS Evening News from 2006 to 2011.

After becoming commercial station WCBW (channel 2, later WCBS-TV) in 1941, the pioneer CBS television station in New York City broadcast two daily news programs, at 2:30 p.m. and 7:30 p.m. weekdays, anchored by Richard Hubbell (journalist). Most of the newscasts featured Hubbell reading a script with only occasional cutaways to a map or still photograph. When Pearl Harbor was bombed on December 7, 1941, WCBW (which was usually off the air on Sunday to give the engineers a day off), took to the air at 8:45 p.m. with an extensive special report. The national emergency even broke down the unspoken wall between CBS radio and television. WCBW executives convinced radio announcers and experts such as George Fielding Elliot and Linton Wells to come down to the Grand Central studios during the evening and give information and commentary on the attack. The WCBW special report that night lasted less than 90 minutes. But that special broadcast pushed the limits of live television in 1941 and opened up new possibilities for future broadcasts. As CBS wrote in a special report to the Federal Communications Commission (FCC), the unscheduled live news broadcast on December 7 "was unquestionably the most stimulating challenge and marked the greatest advance of any single problem faced up to that time."

Additional newscasts were scheduled in the early days of the war. In May 1942, WCBW, like most television stations, sharply cut back its live program schedule and the newscasts were canceled, since the station temporarily suspended studio operations, resorting exclusively to the occasional broadcast of films. This was primarily because much of the staff had either joined the service or were redeployed to war related technical research, and to prolong the life of the early, unstable cameras which were now impossible to repair due to the wartime lack of parts.

In May 1944, as World War II began to turn in favor of the Allies, WCBW reopened the studios and the newscasts returned, briefly anchored by Ned Calmer, and then by Everett Holles. After the end of World War II, expanded news programs appeared on the WCBW schedule –(its call letters were changed to WCBS-TV in 1946) – first anchored by Milo Boulton, and later by Douglas Edwards. On May 3, 1948, Edwards began anchoring CBS Television News, a regular 15-minute nightly newscast on the CBS television network, including WCBS-TV. It aired every weeknight at 7:30 p.m., and was the first regularly scheduled, network television news program featuring an anchor (the nightly Lowell Thomas NBC radio network newscast was simulcast on television locally on NBC's WNBT, which became WNBC, for a time in the early 1940s, along with Richard Hubbell, Ned Calmer, Everett Holles, and Milo Boulton on WCBW in the early and mid-1940s, but these were local television broadcasts seen only in New York City). NBC's offering at the time, NBC Television Newsreel (which premiered in February 1948), was simply film footage with voice narration.

=== Mid-late 20th century ===
In 1948, CBS Radio journalist Edmund Chester emerged as the television network's new Director of News Special Events and Sports.

In 1949, Chester collaborated with one of CBS' original Murrow Boys, Larry LeSueur, to produce the innovative news series United Nations In Action. Underwritten by Ford Motor Company as a public service, the broadcasts endeavored to provide live coverage of the proceedings of the United Nations General Assembly from its interim headquarters in Lake Success, New York. They proved to be successful, and were honored with a George Foster Peabody Award for Television News in 1949.

In 1950, the name of the nightly newscast was changed to Douglas Edwards with the News, and the following year, it became the first news program to be broadcast on both coasts, thanks to a new coaxial cable connection, prompting Edwards to use the greeting "Good evening everyone, coast to coast." In 1962, the broadcast was renamed the CBS Evening News when Walter Cronkite replaced Edwards. Edwards remained with CBS News, contributing to various daytime television newscasts and radio news broadcasts until his retirement on April 1, 1988.

From the 1990s until 2014, CBS News operated its own production unit CBS News Productions, to produce alternative programming for cable networks, and CBS EyeToo Productions, later renamed CBS Eye Productions, a company that produced documentaries and nonfiction programs.

CBS News ran a cable channel, CBS Eye on People, from 1997 to 2000, and Spanish language channel CBS Telenoticias from 1996 to 1998.

=== 21st century ===
In 2021, CBS News had set up its own production unit. See It Now Studios, which was headed by Susan Zirinsky.

Until April 2021, the president and senior executive producer of CBS News was Susan Zirinsky, who assumed the role on March 1, 2019. Zirinsky, the first female president of the network's news division, was announced as the choice to replace David Rhodes on January 6, 2019. The announcement came amid news that Rhodes would step down as president of CBS News "amid falling ratings and the fallout from revelations from an investigation into sexual misconduct allegations" against CBS News figures and Rhodes.

In April 2021, CBS Television Stations and CBS News merged their two divisions into one entity named CBS News and Stations.

On April 15, 2021, CBS Television Stations and CBS News announced that their respective divisions would merge into one entity, to be named CBS News and Stations. It was also announced that Neeraj Khemlani (former executive vice president of Hearst Newspapers) and Wendy McMahon (former president of the ABC Owned Television Stations Group) were named presidents and co-heads. This transition was completed on May 3, 2021. On August 14, 2023, after Khemlani announced he was stepping down, CBS News named McMahon as its sole president and CEO. The next day on August 15, CBS News appointed Ingrid Ciprian-Matthews, who supervised the Washington, D.C. bureau as its president. She stepped down in July 2024.

In 2022, CBS News hired former Trump administration official Mick Mulvaney as a paid on-air contributor. Mulvaney's hiring stirred controversy within the company due to his history of promoting Donald Trump's false claims and attacking the press. CBS News co-president Neeraj Khemlani told CBS morning show staff, "If you look at some of the people that we've been hiring on a contributor basis, being able to make sure that we are getting access to both sides of the aisle is a priority because we know the Republicans are going to take over, most likely, in the midterms".

Trump v. CBS Broadcasting Inc
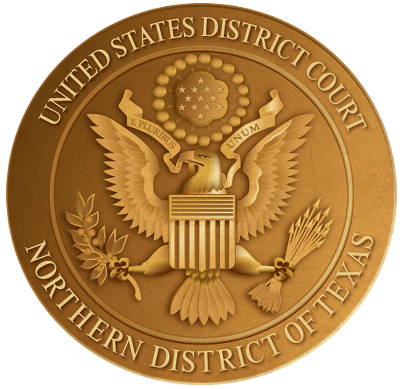
- Court: Northern District of Texas
- Started: October 31, 2024
- Docket nos.: 2:24-cv-00236

Outcome
- Case closed in July 2025 with prejudice after settlement

Court membership
- Judge sitting: Matthew Kacsmaryk

Keywords
- Donald Trump's conflict with the news media

In October 2024, President Donald Trump sued CBS News over a 60 Minutes interview with former Vice President Kamala Harris, alleging that the network engaged in election interference through deceptive editing. The lawsuit, which sought $10 billion in damages, claimed that CBS violated the Texas Deceptive Trade Practices Act by airing two different edits of Harris' response to a question about Israeli Prime Minister Benjamin Netanyahu. The lawsuit was widely described as frivolous by legal experts.

Initially, the network released a statement that it would "vigorously defend" against the suit. In July 2025, CBS News' parent company, Paramount Global, settled the lawsuit for $16 million, which would be given to Trump's future presidential library and lawyer costs. The settlement was described as a capitulation to Trump's executive power and blow to freedom of the press, with Stephen Colbert characterizing it as "a big fat bribe". Colbert's show was cancelled shortly thereafter. Paramount's merger with Skydance Media, which needed executive approval, was cited as a key motivating factor in the network's decision to settle.

In January 2025, Norah O'Donnell, who was based in the CBS News bureau in Washington, D.C., for over five years, departed, resulting in CBS Evening News to once again be broadcast from the CBS Broadcast Center's historic Studio 47 in New York City. Face the Nation host and CBS News correspondent Margaret Brennan, however, continue to be based in Washington, D.C.

Tom Cibrowski was hired as president in February 2025.

In April 2025, 60 Minutes executive producer Bill Owens left the network, citing deterioration of journalistic independence. The following month, CBS News president Wendy McMahon also resigned due to disagreements with corporate leadership. As the Federal Communications Commission required the appointment of an ombudsman to monitor "bias" at CBS News for agency approval of the Paramount–Skydance merger, Paramount Skydance CEO David Ellison appointed Kenneth R. Weinstein (the former CEO of the Hudson Institute, a conservative foreign policy think tank) to the position in September 2025. FCC chair Brendan Carr, speaking of approval of the merger, stated in an interview to The Wall Street Journal that "The new owners of CBS came in and said, 'It's time for a change'" and that they said "'We're going to reorient it towards getting rid of bias.'" Carr added: "At the end of the day, that's what made the difference for us."

In October 2025, Bari Weiss was appointed editor-in-chief of CBS News. This announcement was interpreted by critics as a mark of the organization shifting rightward and more pro-Israel in response to the Trump Era, and was likewise praised by Trump himself. In October, around 100 predominantly non-white employees were laid off, including eight on-air hosts, all of whom were women. This came amidst a broader removal in the United States of non-white employees from political and journalistic positions. Also after the appointments of Weiss and Weinstein as editor-in-chief and ombudsman respectively, the head of the Standards and Practices department for CBS News resigned in October 2025. Also in October, the conservative, anti-woke digital website The Free Press was bought by Paramount and incorporated as an independent entity within Paramount. Weiss stated that the merger "gives The Free Press a chance to help reshape a storied media organization — to help guide CBS News into a future that honors those great values that underpin The Free Press and the best of American journalism".

Amid the editorial changes being undertaken by Bari Weiss, new CBS Evening News anchor Tony Dokoupil released a promo promising that the newscast planned to remain objective and editorially independent from politicians, advertisers, and corporate interests (including those of CBS itself). He argued that news media coverage at CBS on topics such as the Iraq war, COVID lockdowns, Hillary Clinton's emails, and Hunter Biden's laptop was "skewed" in favor of "political and academic elites and away from the concerns of normal people". CBS Evening News reported its 38-page editorial standards handbook was reduced to "5 simple values" of which one was "we love America", establishing an explicit pro-United States editorial stance. Variety reported the pro-America pledge "reinforce[d] speculation that Ellison put Weiss in charge of CBS News in an effort to boost its appeal among MAGA supporters generally — and with President Trump specifically".

In January 2026, new editor-in-chief Bari Weiss held an all-staff meeting outlining her strategic vision for the troubled news division. She said she planned to hire about 18 paid commentators to broaden the range of voices and content at the network and indicated that she expects to make significant newsroom cuts as part of reshaping the organization.

In February 2026, it was revealed that CBS News was considering another round of layoffs which could see cuts totalling at least 15% of the current staff.

In March 2026, CBS News announced it would shutter its radio news service by May 22, 2026, after nearly 100 years and eliminate all positions tied to it as part of a larger restructuring by Weiss. CBS cited changes in the media landscape and financial pressures as driving the move.

== Broadcast history ==
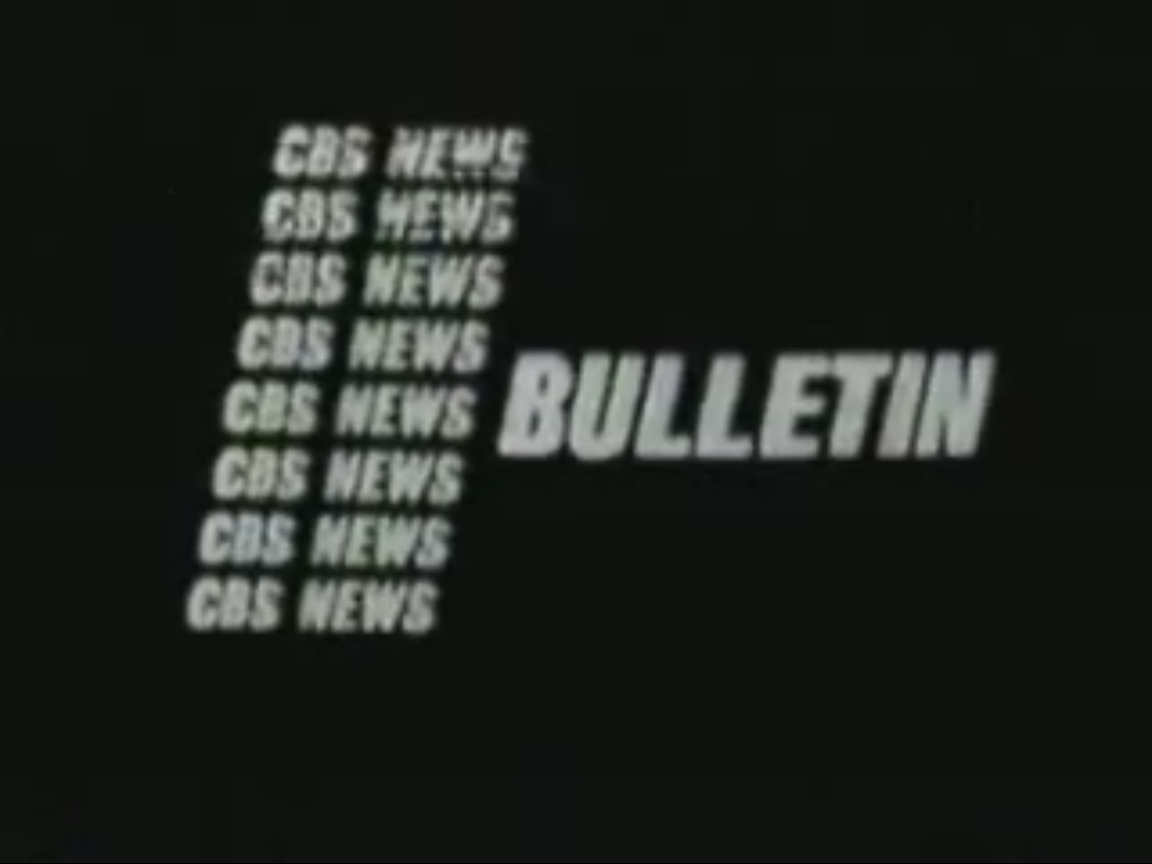
CBS News Bulletin's coverage of the assassination of John F. Kennedy in 1963

The information on programs listed in this section came directly from CBS News in interviews with the Vice President of Communications and NewsWatch Dallas.

According to the CBS News Library and source Sandy Genelius (Vice President, CBS News Communications), the "CBS Evening News" was the program title for both Saturday and Sunday evening broadcasts. The program title for the Sunday late night news beginning in 1963 was the "CBS Sunday Night News". These titles were also seen on the intro slide of the program's opening. The program airs on Saturday, and Sunday nights at 7:00 p.m.–7:30 p.m. UTC (Eastern Time) on CBS.

== CBS News television programs ==
=== News programs ===
- CBS News Roundup (May 29, 2024 – present)
- CBS News Flash (August 2021 – 2024)
- CBS News Mornings (October 4, 1982 – present)
- CBS Mornings (September 7, 2021 – present)
- CBS Evening News (July 1, 1941 – present)
- CBS Saturday Morning (September 18, 2021 – present)
- CBS Weekend News (May 7, 2016 – present)
- 48 Hours (January 19, 1988 – present)
- CBS News Sunday Morning (January 28, 1979 – present)
- Face the Nation (November 7, 1954 – present)
- 60 Minutes (September 24, 1968 – present)

=== Early morning news program history ===
- CBS News Nightwatch (1982–1992)
- CBS News Mornings (1982–present)
- CBS Up to the Minute (1992–2015)
- CBS Overnight News (2015–2024)
- CBS News Roundup (2024–present)

=== Morning news program history ===
- The Morning Show (1954–1956)
- Good Morning! with Will Rogers, Jr. (1956)
- Calendar (1961–1963)
- CBS Morning News (1963–1979; 1982–1987)
- In the News (1971–1986; 1997–1998)
- 30 Minutes (1978–1982)
- Morning (1979–1982)
- The Morning Program (1987)
- CBS This Morning (1987–1999; 2012–2021)
- The Early Show (1999–2012)
- CBS News Saturday Morning (1997–1999)
- The Saturday Early Show (1999–2012)
- CBS This Morning Saturday (2012–2021)
- CBS Mornings (2021–present)
- CBS Saturday Morning (2021–present)
- CBS News Sunday Morning (1979–present)

=== Evening/prime time news program history ===
- CBS Evening News (July 1, 1941 – present)
- West 57th (Meredith Vieira, John Ferrugia) (August 13, 1985 – September 9, 1989)
- 48 Hours (January 19, 1988–present)
- 60 Minutes II (January 13, 1999 – September 2, 2005)
- America Tonight (Dan Rather, Charles Kuralt, Lesley Stahl, Robert Krulwich, Edie Magnus) (October 1, 1990 – 1991)
- Street Stories (Ed Bradley; January 9, 1992 – June 10, 1993)
- Eye to Eye with Connie Chung (June 17, 1993 – May 25, 1995)
- Public Eye with Bryant Gumbel (October 1, 1997 – 1998)
- CBS Newsbreak (1976–2009)
- Who's Who (1977)
- Person to Person (1953–1961; 2012; 2022–present)

=== Other programs ===
- United Nations in Action (1949)
- You Are There (1953–1973)
- Adventure (1953–1955)
- Youth Takes a Stand (1953–1954)
- Air Power (1956–1957)
- The Twentieth Century (1957–1970)
- CBS Reports (1959–2010)
- Of Black America (1968)
- In The News (1971–1986; 1997–1998)
- Razzmatazz (1977–1982) (co-production with Scholastic Magazines, Inc.)
- West 57th (1985–1989)
- America Tonight (1990–1991)
- 20th Century with Mike Wallace (1993–2001)
- Biography (1996–2005)
- Off Tenth (1997)
- Fast Forward (1997–1999)
- Scandal! (1998–2007)
- BET Nightly News (2001–2005) (co-production with BET Studios)
- TV Land Legends: The 60 Minutes Interviews (2002–2004) (co-production with TV Land)
- TV Land Moguls (2004–2009) (co-production with TV Land)
- What's Hot! What's Cool! (2004)
- 365gay News (2005–2009) (co-production with Logo TV)
- Secret Lives of Women (2005–2009) (co-production with CBS Eye Productions and Kaos Entertainment)
- Commander Castle (2006)
- FutureCar (2007)
- Eco-Tech (2007) (co-production with Beanfield Productions and Silent Crow Arts)
- Brink (2008–2009) (co-production with CBS Eye Productions)
- 48 Hours on ID (2010–present)
- Juicy and Jaded (2012) (co-production with Euphoric Entertainment)
- 60 Minutes Sports (2013–2017) (co-production with Showtime Networks)
- Brooklyn DA (2013)
- Whistleblower (2018–2019) (co-production with CBS Studios)
- The FBI Declassified (2020–present)
- Boiling Point (2021–present) (co-production with BET Studios)
- Indivisible: Healing Hate (2022) (co-production with XG Productions)
- Ghislaine: Partner in Crime (2022) (co-production with Fremantle)
- 60 Minutes More (1997)
- 60 Minutes+ (2021–2022)
- 11 Minutes (2022)

== CBS News Radio ==
CBS News produced newscasts and features for radio stations through CBS News Radio, which was the oldest unit of CBS and traced its roots to the company's founding in 1927, and the news division took shape over the decade that followed. The list of CBS News correspondents (below) includes those reporting on CBS News Radio.

CBS News Radio produced the oldest daily news show on radio or television, the CBS World News Roundup, which first aired in 1938; in 2018, it celebrated its 80th anniversary. The World News Roundup aired twice every weekday, broadcasting a morning edition anchored by Steve Kathan and produced by Paul Farry, and a late edition anchored by Dave Barrett and produced by James Hutton. The evening Roundup, previously known as The World Tonight, had aired since 1956, and had been anchored by Blair Clark, Douglas Edwards, Dallas Townsend, and Christopher Glenn, Glenn also anchored the morning Roundup prior to his death in 2006.

CBS Radio Network provided newscasts at the top of the hour, regular updates at:31 minutes past the hour, the popular Newsfeeds for affiliates, including WCBS in New York City and KYW in Philadelphia, at:35 minutes past the hour, and breaking news updates when developments warrant, often at:20 and:50 minutes past the hour. Audacy's Infinity Networks handled the distribution.

In 2026, CBS announced its radio news service would be shut down on May 22, 2026, as part of a larger restructuring due in part to changes in the media landscape and financial pressures.

== CBS Newspath ==
CBS Newspath is CBS News' satellite news-gathering service, similar in format to CNN Newsource. Newspath provides national hard news, sports highlights, regional spot news, features and live coverage of major breaking news events for affiliate stations to use in their local news broadcasts. The service has a team of domestic and global correspondents and freelance reporters dedicated to reporting for affiliates, and offers several different national or international stories fronted by reporters on a daily basis. CBS Newspath also relies heavily on local affiliates sharing content. Stations will often contribute locally obtained footage that may be of national interest. It replaced a similar service, CBS News NewsNet.

In late 1999, the news-gathering arms of CBS (Newspath), ABC (NewsOne) and Fox (NewsEdge) agreed to form a joint-venture footage sharing pool, known as Network News Service.

== CBS News 24/7 ==
CBS News 24/7 is a 24-hour streaming news channel which launched on November 4, 2014, as CBSN. At the time as CBSN, the channel features live news from 9 a.m. to midnight on weekdays. The channel makes all of the resources of CBS News available directly on digital platforms with live, anchored coverage 15 hours each week. It is a first for a U.S. 24-hour news channel to forgo cable and be available exclusively only online and on smart devices such as smart TV's Apple TV, Roku, Amazon Fire and others. The channel is based at CBS's New York City headquarters.

The morning hours are typically anchored by Errol Barnett and Vladimir Duthiers, with afternoons anchored by a rotating team. Various correspondents in Washington D.C. anchor a late-afternoon political program titled, 'America Decides' and John Dickerson anchors "The Daily Report", which airs Mondays through Thursdays.

Unionized writers of CBS News 24/7 held a 24-hour walkout on March 17, 2026, after their contract expired on March 9, and negotiations failed. CBS and Paramount signed a three-year agreement with the Writers Guild of America East on April 2, pending a ratification vote by union members.

== News bureaus ==
=== Domestic bureaus ===
- New York City (Main CBS News headquarters)
- Washington, D.C. (White House Bureau)
- Atlanta
- Chicago
- Dallas
- Denver
- Kennedy Space Center
- Los Angeles (West Coast bureau)
- Miami
- San Francisco

=== Foreign bureaus ===
==== Africa ====
- Johannesburg

==== Asia ====
- Bangkok
- Beijing, where it does not have a correspondent, but does have a producer-camera person
- Kabul
- (Formerly, until April 3, 2024) Tokyo

==== Europe ====
- London
- Paris
- Rome

==== Middle East ====
- Tel Aviv

== Personnel ==
=== Current television hosts, anchors, correspondents, and reporters ===
New York (Main Headquarters)

- Jim Axelrod – National Correspondent (1996–present)
- Errol Barnett – National Correspondent, Anchor, CBS News 24/7 (2016–present)
- James Brown – Special Correspondent (1984–1993, 2006–present)
- Nate Burleson – Co-Anchor, CBS Mornings (2021–present)
- Adriana Diaz – Correspondent (2012–present); Co-Anchor, CBS Saturday Morning (2026–present)
- Tony Dokoupil – Anchor, CBS Evening News (2026–present); Correspondent (2016–present)
- Jericka Duncan – Correspondent, CBS Mornings (2013–present); Anchor, CBS Weekend News (2020–present)
- Vladimir Duthiers – Co-Anchor, CBS Mornings (2022–present); Anchor, CBS News 24/7 (2016–present); Correspondent (2014–present)
- Michael George – Anchor, CBS News Mornings and CBS News 24/7
- Anne-Marie Green – 48 Hours Correspondent (2024–present), Anchor/Correspondent (2004–present)
- Peter Greenberg – Travel Editor
- Shanelle Kaul – Correspondent
- Gayle King – Co-Anchor, CBS Mornings (2012–present)
- Dr. Jonathan LaPook – Chief Medical Correspondent
- Rob Marciano – Senior National Weather Correspondent (2024–present)
- Anthony Mason – Culture and National Correspondent (1986–present)
- Jessi Mitchell – Anchor, CBS News Roundup
- Erin Moriarty – Correspondent, 48 Hours and CBS News Sunday Morning (1986–present)
- Kelly O'Grady – Co-Anchor, CBS Saturday Morning (2026–present)
- Meg Oliver – Correspondent (2006–2009; 2015–present)
- Jane Pauley – Anchor, CBS News Sunday Morning (2016–present), Contributing Correspondent (2014–present)
- Lindsey Reiser – Anchor and Correspondent, CBS News 24/7
- Mo Rocca – Correspondent, CBS News Sunday Morning (2006–present)
- Tracy Smith – Correspondent, 48 Hours and CBS News Sunday Morning (2000–present)
- Lesley Stahl – Co-editor, 60 Minutes (1991–present), Correspondent (1971–present)
- Martha Teichner – Correspondent, CBS News Sunday Morning (1977–present)
- Peter Van Sant – Correspondent, 48 Hours (1984–present)
- Bill Whitaker – Correspondent, 60 Minutes (2014–present), Correspondent (1984–present)
- Lana Zak – Anchor, CBS News 24/7

Washington, D.C. (White House Bureau)

- Margaret Brennan – Anchor, Face the Nation (2018–present); Chief Foreign Affairs Correspondent (2012–present)
- Nancy Cordes – Chief White House Correspondent (2007–present)
- Robert Costa – National Correspondent, CBS News Sunday Morning; Chief Washington Analyst (2022–present)
- Jan Crawford – Chief Legal Correspondent (2005–2006; 2009–present)
- Major Garrett – Chief Washington Correspondent (2012–present); Anchor, America Decides (2025–present)
- Caitlin Huey-Burns – Congressional Correspondent (2018–present)
- Willie James Inman – White House Reporter
- Jennifer Jacobs – Senior White House Reporter (2024–present)
- Weijia Jiang – Senior White House Correspondent (2012–present)
- Nikole Killion – Congressional Correspondent (2018–present)
- David Martin – National Security Correspondent (1983–present)
- Norah O'Donnell – Senior Correspondent (2011–present)
- Ed O'Keefe – Senior White House Correspondent (2018–present)
- Nicole Sganga – Homeland Security Correspondent (2015–present)
- Taurean Small – Campaign Reporter
- Susan Spencer – Correspondent, 48 Hours and CBS News Sunday Morning (1977–present)
- Cecilia Vega – Correspondent, 60 Minutes (2023–present)

Atlanta

- Dave Malkoff – Correspondent (2023–present)
- Mark Strassmann – Correspondent (2001–present)
- Skyler Henry – Reporter

Chicago

- Charlie DeMar – Reporter, CBS Chicago/WBBM-TV (2016–present)

Los Angeles (West Coast Bureau)

- Lee Cowan – Correspondent, CBS News Sunday Morning (1996–2007; 2013–present)
- Carter Evans – Correspondent
- Matt Gutman – Chief Correspondent (2026–present)
- Lilia Luciano – Correspondent
- Natalie Morales – Correspondent and 48 Hours Contributor (2021–present)
- Kris Van Cleave – Transportation Correspondent
- Jonathan Vigliotti – Correspondent (2015–present)
- Jamie Yuccas – Correspondent, KCAL-TV and KCBS-TV (2011–present)

Miami

- Manuel Bojorquez – Correspondent (2012–present)

London

- Charlie D'Agata – Senior Foreign Correspondent (2002–present)
- Ian Lee – Foreign Correspondent
- Mark Phillips – Senior Foreign Correspondent (1982–present)
- Imtiaz Tyab – Senior Foreign Correspondent (2019–present)
- Holly Williams – Foreign Correspondent (2012–present)

Hong Kong

- Anna Coren – Foreign Correspondent (2025–present)

Rome

- Seth Doane – Foreign Correspondent (2007–present)
- Chris Livesay – Foreign Correspondent (2020–present)

=== Current contributors ===
- Serena Altschul – Contributing Correspondent, CBS News Sunday Morning (2003–present)
- David Becker – Election Law Contributor
- David Begnaud – Contributor, CBS Mornings (2013–present)
- Luke Burbank – Correspondent, CBS News Sunday Morning (2013–present)
- Alina Cho – Contributor, CBS News Sunday Morning
- Lisa Damour – Psychologist Contributor, CBS Mornings
- Nancy Giles – Contributor, CBS News Sunday Morning (2003–present)
- Steve Hartman – "On The Road" CBS Evening News, CBS News Sunday Morning (1994–present)
- Hua Hsu – Contributor, CBS News Sunday Morning
- Jo Ling Kent – Senior Business & Technology Correspondent (2022–present)
- Rikki Klieman – Legal Analyst
- Conor Knighton – Correspondent, CBS News Sunday Morning (2016–present)
- Ted Koppel – Contributor, CBS News Sunday Morning (2016–present)
- Robert Krulwich – Contributor, CBS News Sunday Morning
- Ben Mankiewicz – Contributor, CBS News Sunday Morning (2019–present)
- Wynton Marsalis – Cultural Correspondent (1996–present)
- Kelly O'Grady – MoneyWatch Correspondent (2024–present)
- Barry Petersen – Contributing Correspondent (1974–present)
- David Pogue – Correspondent CBS News Sunday Morning (2002–present)
- Lonnie Quinn – CBS Evening News Weather Contributor (1997–present)
- Faith Salie – Contributor, CBS News Sunday Morning
- Kelefa Sanneh – Contributor, CBS News Sunday Morning
- Ben Stein – Contributor, CBS News Sunday Morning
- Jamie Wax – Contributor
- Jon Wertheim – Correspondent, 60 Minutes (2017–present)
- Mark Whitaker – Correspondent and Contributor, CBS News Sunday Morning

=== Current radio personalities ===
Radio division closed May 2026

=== Newspath correspondents ===
- Danya Bacchus – Correspondent (based in Los Angeles)
- Cristian Benavides – Correspondent (based in Miami)
- Natalie Brand – Correspondent (based in Washington, D.C.)
- Dina Demetrius – Correspondent (based in Los Angeles)
- Michael George – Correspondent (based in New York)
- Diane King Hall – MoneyWatch Correspondent (based in New York)
- Tom Hanson – Correspondent (based in New York)
- Nichelle Medina – Correspondent (based in Los Angeles)
- Laura Podesta – Correspondent (based in New York)
- Anthony Pura – Correspondent (based in Los Angeles)
- Femi Redwood – Correspondent (based in New York)
- Naomi Ruchim – Correspondent (based in New York)

=== Past correspondents ===
- Betsy Aaron
- Enrique Acevedo (2020–2022), later TelevisaUnivision
- Jim Acosta – later at CNN
- Jacqueline Adams
- Martin Agronsky +
- Sharyn Alfonsi – (2002–2008, 2011–2026)
- Craig Allen, at WHSQ in New York City and News 12 Networks)
- David Andelman – at CNN
- Wyatt Andrews – (1981–2015) retired from journalism
- Howard Arenstein
- Bob Arnot (later at NBC News and MSNBC)
- Jennifer Ashton – later at ABC News, then editor in chief of Ajenda
- Thalia Assuras (1997–2009)
- Sharyl Attkisson (1993–2014)
- Barry Bagnato
- José Díaz-Balart – at Telemundo and at NBC News
- Dave Barrett +
- Roberta Baskin – (later at WJLA-TV in Washington, D.C.)
- Nikki Battiste (2017–2025)
- Nelson Benton +
- Lowell Bergman
- John Blackstone – (1980–2018) retired
- Derrick Blakley (later at WBBM-TV) retired from journalism
- Jerry Bowen (1969–2007) retired from journalism
- Regina Blakely
- Cynthia Bowers (1996–2012)
- Betty Ann Bowser +
- Ed Bradley +
- Ray Brady +
- Rita Braver – (1972–2025) retired from journalism
- Marvin Breckinridge Patterson +
- Heywood Hale Broun +
- Joel Brown
- Karen Brown
- Cecil Brown +
- Terrell Brown – at WLS-TV in Chicago
- Mika Brzezinski – (1997–2001, 2001–2007) at MSNBC
- Winston Burdett +
- Ned Calmer +
- Gretchen Carlson – later at Fox News
- Harley Carnes – (1992–2020) retired
- Julie Chen Moonves (1999–2018)
- Nancy Chen
- Sylvia Chase +
- Connie Chung – (1970s–1982, 1989–1995) retired
- Sam Chu-Lin +
- Lou Cioffi +
- Blair Clark +
- Mandy Clark
- Michele Clark + (died aboard United Air Lines Flight 553, which crashed in Chicago on December 8, 1972)
- Jane Clayson (1999–2008; later at NPR)
- Ron Cochran +
- Charles Collingwood +
- Anderson Cooper – (2006–2026)
- Victoria Corderi – later at NBC News
- Katie Couric (2006–2011)
- Kenneth Craig (2015–2020)
- Walter Cronkite +
- Frank Currier +
- Don Dahler
- John Charles Daly +
- Faith Daniels
- Randy Daniels
- Priya David
- Morton Dean – (1964–1984) later at ABC News; retired
- David Dick +
- John Dickerson
- Nancy Dickerson +
- Linda Douglass
- Harold Dow +
- Bill Downs +
- Kimberly Dozier – at The Daily Beast, then CNN
- Terry Drinkwater +
- Maurice DuBois
- Jed Duvall +
- Douglas Edwards +
- Eric Engberg +
- Pamela Falk
- Tom Fenton +
- Giselle Fernández
- John Ferrugia – at Rocky Mountain PBS
- Murray Fromson +
- Bob Fuss +
- Monica Gayle – later at WJBK; retired
- Bill Geist – (1987–2018) retired
- Phyllis George +
- Kendis Gibson – later at NBC News
- Michelle Gielan
- Christopher Glenn +
- Jeff Glor – (2007–2024)
- Bernard Goldberg (later at Fox News and at HBO Sports)
- Julianna Goldman (2014–2018)
- Bianna Golodryga – at CNN
- Marci Gonzalez (2021–2024)
- Fred Graham +
- Jeff Greenfield – later at PBS
- Bryant Gumbel – later at HBO Sports
- Tony Guida – at CUNY TV
- Bruce Hall +
- Nanette Hansen
- John Hart – (1960–1975) later at NBC News; retired
- Celia Hatton
- David Henderson
- Allison Harmelin
- George Herman +
- Catherine Herridge (2019–2024)
- Erica Hill – at CNN
- Sandy Hill
- Don Hollenbeck +
- Richard C. Hottelet +
- Sandra Hughes
- Dana Jacobson – (2015–2025)
- Allan Jackson +
- Rebecca Jarvis – at ABC News
- Whit Johnson – at ABC News
- Phil Jones +
- Gordon Joseloff +
- Bernard Kalb +
- Marvin Kalb – (1957–1980) retired
- Peter Kalischer +
- H.V. Kaltenborn +
- Hattie Kauffman
- Frank Kearns +
- Alexander Kendrick +
- Armen Keteyian
- Dana King
- Mark Knoller +
- Susan Koeppen
- Jeffrey Kofman (later at ABC News)
- Steve Kroft – (1980–2019) retired from journalism
- Robert Krulwich (later at NPR) retired
- Charles Kuralt +
- Bill Kurtis (later at WBBM-TV in Chicago) retired
- Stephanie Lambidakis (1985–2013) retired
- John Laurence – at ABC News
- Mola Lenghi – at ABC News
- Bill Leonard +
- Larry LeSueur +
- Stan Levey +
- Lisa Ling (2023–2025)
- Lara Logan (2002–2018)
- Bill Lynch +
- Vicki Mabrey
- Scott MacFarlane (2022–2026)
- Sheila MacVicar
- Peter Maer (1975–2015) retired from journalism
- Maureen Maher (1997–2021)
- Paul Manning +
- Carol Marin – later at WMAQ-TV; retired from journalism
- Chris Mavridis
- Lark McCarthy
- Melissa McDermott
- Mark McEwen
- Susan McGinnis
- Derek McGinty – later at WUSA
- Jim McKay +
- Bob McKeown (later at CBC News) then retired
- Bill McLaughlin +
- Marya McLaughlin +
- Tara Mergener
- Michelle Miller (2004–2025)
- Russ Mitchell – at WKYC
- DeMarco Morgan – later at ABC News
- Edward P. Morgan +
- Bruce Morton +
- Bill Moyers + – later at PBS
- Roger Mudd +
- Edward R. Murrow +
- Reena Ninan
- Paul K. Niven Jr. +
- Betty Nguyen – (later at NBC News and MSNBC; then at WPIX in New York City)
- Deborah Norville – later weekday anchor, Inside Edition
- Stuart Novins +
- Bill O'Reilly (later at Fox News; then at Newsmax)
- Teri Okita
- Bob Orr – (1993–2015) retired from journalism
- Charles Osgood +
- Elizabeth Palmer (2000–2026)
- Ike Pappas +
- Debora Patta (2013–2025)
- Jeff Pegues (2013–2024)
- Scott Pelley – (1989–2026)
- Terry Phillips
- Robert Pierpoint +
- Randall Pinkston (1980–2013; later at Al Jazeera America)
- Byron Pitts – at ABC News
- Allen Pizzey (1980–2016) retired from journalism
- Bill Plante +
- George Polk +
- Steven Portnoy – at ABC News
- Ned Potter (later at ABC News) retired
- Elise Preston
- Dave Price – at WNBC
- Elaine Quijano – (2010–2026)
- Jane Bryant Quinn
- Sally Quinn
- Bert Quint +
- Ed Rabel
- Art Rascon – (1994–1998; later with KTRK-TV)
- Dan Rather – (1962–2006; then at AXS TV)
- Dan Raviv – (1974–2017; then host of The Mossad Files and The Quest for Significance podcast)
- Harry Reasoner +
- Trish Regan – at Fox Business
- Chip Reid
- Paula Reid – at CNN
- Dean Reynolds – (2007–2020) retired from journalism
- Frank Reynolds +
- Tanya Rivero – (2005–2007, 2017–2024) at WABC-TV
- Jane Robelot – at WYFF-TV
- John Roberts (1992–2006; later at CNN; then Fox News)
- Troy Roberts – (1993–2017; now at NBC News)
- Norman Robinson – retired from journalism
- Maggie Rodriguez (with WFLA-TV in Tampa)
- Andy Rooney +
- Charlie Rose – (1984–1990; 2012–2017)
- Richard Roth (1972–2010) based in Moscow, Rome, Los Angeles, New York and London
- Hughes Rudd +
- Christina Ruffini – at NBC News
- Morley Safer +
- Marlene Sanders +
- Diane Sawyer – (1978–1989) now at ABC News
- Forrest Sawyer – (later at ABC News and then at MSNBC)
- Bob Schieffer
- Stephen Schiff
- Richard Schlesinger – (1984–2022) retired
- David Schoenbrun +
- Daniel Schorr +
- David Schoumacher +
- Dr. Emily Senay
- Barry Serafin – (1969–1979) later at ABC News; retired
- Don Hewitt +
- Roxana Saberi (2018–2024)
- Eric Sevareid +
- David Schechter – National Environmental Correspondent (2022–2026)
- Frank Settipani (1981–2017) retired
- Bill Shadel +
- Janet Shamlian (2019–2025)
- Bernard Shaw +
- John Sheahan
- Gary Shepard (1963–1984) later at ABC News; retired from journalism
- William L. Shirer +
- Lewis Shollenberger +
- Maria Shriver – at NBC News
- Daniel Sieberg
- Bob Simon +
- Bob Sirott
- Harry Smith – (1986–2011) later at NBC News; retired
- Howard K. Smith +
- Terence Smith – (1985–1998) later at PBS Newshour; retired
- Joan Snyder +
- Bianca Solorzano
- Hari Sreenivasan – weekend anchor, PBS Newshour
- Andrea Stassou
- John Stehr – lead anchor at WTHR until retirement in 2018/ mayor of Zionsville, Indiana.
- Jim Stewart – (1990–2006) retired from journalism
- Alison Stewart – at PBS
- Hannah Storm – at ESPN and ESPN on ABC
- Bill Stout +
- Kathleen Sullivan (later at E! News)
- Rene Syler – at Aspire
- Lowell Thomas +
- Richard Threlkeld +
- Dallas Townsend +
- Ben Tracy – (2008–2024)
- Liz Trotta
- Robert Trout +
- Gaby Tabunar +
- Lem Tucker +
- Debbye Turner
- Cecilia Vega
- Meredith Vieira – at NBC News
- Omar Villafranca
- Mireya Villarreal – at ABC News
- Alex Wagner – at NBC News and MSNBC
- Richard Wagner +
- Jane Wallace
- Kelly Wallace
- Mike Wallace +
- Clarissa Ward – at CNN
- Anna Werner – (2011–2024)
- Bill Whitney (1979–2016) retired
- Charles Wolfson (1970–2010) retired
- Chris Wragge – at WCBS-TV
- Nick Young – (1990–2020) retired
- Steve Young +
- Paula Zahn – at CNN; later at Investigation Discovery

+ : deceased

== Presidents of CBS News ==
- Richard S. Salant (1961–1964)
- Fred W. Friendly (1964–1966)
- Richard S. Salant (1966–1979)
- Bill Leonard (1979–1982)
- Van Gordon Sauter (1982–1983)
- Ed Joyce (1983–1986)
- Van Gordon Sauter (1986)
- Howard Stringer (1986–1988)
- David W. Burke (1988–1990)
- Eric Ober (1990–1996)
- Andrew Heyward (1996–2005)
- Sean McManus (2005–2011)
- David Rhodes (2011–2019)
- Susan Zirinsky (2019–2021)
- Neeraj Khemlani (2021–2023)
- Ingrid Ciprian-Matthews (2023–2024)
- Wendy McMahon (2021–2025)
- Tom Cibrowski (2025–present)

Tom Cibrowski currently serves as president of CBS News and reports to Paramount TV head George Cheeks. Editor-in-chief Bari Weiss works alongside Cibrowski but reports directly to Paramount CEO David Ellison and is also in charge of her former digital website and now independent CBS News division The Free Press.

== Reporting partnerships ==
In 2017, CBS News entered into a content-sharing agreement with BBC News, respectively replacing previous arrangements between the BBC and ABC News, and CBS and Sky News (which was partially controlled by 21st Century Fox until 2018 when ownership was then transferred to Comcast). The partnership includes the ability to share resources, footage, and reports, and conduct "efficient planning of news gathering resources to increase the content of each broadcaster's coverage of world events".

Although they do not have an official partnership, CNN and CBS News share correspondents and contributors, including Anderson Cooper and Sanjay Gupta.

In 2022, CBS News entered into a content-sharing partnership with The Weather Channel, where The Weather Channel meteorologists will appear on CBS News programs.

Beginning in 2025, The Free Press operates as an independent entity within Paramount and has its stories featured online at CBS News.

== Controversies ==
Notable controversies include the resignation of CBS News president Fred Friendly in 1966 to protest against Vietnam War coverage, the 2004 Killian documents controversy involving Dan Rather presenting improperly verified documents, accusations of liberal bias and plagiarism, and several instances of misrepresented or erroneously attributed footage.

=== Paramount Skydance ownership controversies ===
In 2025, CBS News President Wendy McMahon and 60 Minutes executive producer Bill Owens resigned; Owens stated his departure was due to a loss of journalistic independence. Following editorial changes by owner Larry Ellison and editor-in-chief Bari Weiss that same year, CBS News faced allegations of a conservative, pro-Trump, pro-MAGA bias. Pro-Trump comments by Federal Communications Commission chair Brendan Carr regarding CBS News were criticized for highlighting the extent politics played a part in approval of the Paramount-Skydance merger, such as his statement that "President Trump is fundamentally reshaping the media landscape" and that Paramount's promise to remove "bias" at CBS News "made the difference to us". In early 2026, under newly appointed editor-in-chief Bari Weiss, CBS Evening News' Tony Dokoupil introduced "5 simple values", a set of principles that inform how the show presents news. The principles, which espoused American-centric values, led to increased speculation that Weiss's appointment was aimed at gaining approval from MAGA supporters, including Donald Trump.

The Guardian wrote that among the new contributors Weiss had hired was Mark Hyman, who had "been called a 'germ theory denialist' by the medical author Harriet Hall". The Guardian also wrote he is associated with Robert F. Kennedy Jr. and that he is "a doctor who has claimed that he has reduced his biological age by 20 years with therapies including cold plunges; that cod liver oil can treat autism and that conditions like Alzheimer's and dementia can be reversed with the kind of nutritional supplements he also sells on his online store." Jonathan Jarry, a science communicator for McGill University's Office for Science and Society said, "By hiring Mark Hyman, CBS News will be misinforming its large audience on the subject of health. Hyman is the face of functional medicine … CBS viewers will be told that true health is about testing for everything – at a cost – and gorging yourself on an array of unproven and unnecessary dietary supplements. This is in keeping with what is happening under Trump: the institutionalization of pseudoscience."

In April 2026, David Ellison and CBS News' Bari Weiss, Norah O'Donnell, Tom Cibrowski, CBS News president, Makan Delrahim, Paramount's chief legal officer, Jan Crawford, the network's chief legal correspondent, chief White House correspondent Nancy Cordes, and Weijia Jiang, White House correspondent and president of the White House Correspondents' Association; all attended a party "honoring" Donald Trump and the First Amendment with Trump, acting attorney general Todd Blanche, Secretary of State Marco Rubio, and Stephen Miller, deputy White House chief of staff. The DOJ's antitrust division was in the process of reviewing a merger by Ellison to acquire Warner Bros. Discovery which would give him ownership of CNN. The New York Times reported that party invitations sent to guests said the event was for "honoring the Trump White House", and several CBS News journalists expressed surprise and consternation over the dinner, worried that the event had the "potential to create a perception of coziness between the news division and the Trump administration".

Former CBS Evening News anchor Katie Couric expressed concerns over the direction of the network, saying that the focus should be on the truth and not appealing to a certain audience. She called out CBS News' 2026 highlight of the January 6 United States Capitol attack as potentially engaging in a false balance by presenting the Trump and Democratic view of the event and questioned whether news broadcasts were supposed to repeat false claims uncritically to appear unbiased.

In June 2026, veteran 60 Minutes correspondent Scott Pelley was fired after a series of contentious meetings with its newly installed executive producer, Nick Bilton. After his departure, Pelley accused Weiss and her management team of instructing him to inject "falsehoods and bias" into politically sensitive 60 Minutes coverage, pressuring him to make assertions that could not be verified, and allowing politicians to influence which correspondents covered them.

== See also ==
- ABC News
- Bloomberg News
- CBS News controversies and criticism
- CBS Telenoticias
- CNN
- Fox News
- Independent News Network
- NBC News
- Noticias Univision
