= Ingrid Ciprián-Matthews =

American journalist and television producer

- Born: Santo Domingo, Dominican Republic
- Education: Barnard College; New York University
- Occupation: Television producer

Ingrid Ciprián-Matthews is an American television producer, most recently serving as the president of CBS News from August 2023 to July 2024.

== Life ==
Ciprián-Matthews was born in Santo Domingo but moved to the USA when she was four years old. She earned a bachelor's degree from Barnard College. She received a master's degree in journalism from the New York University in 1984.

Ciprián-Matthews was a general assignment reporter for NPR's Spanish-language program, Enfoque Nacional. She later worked as a managing editor of CNN's New York bureau. In 1993, she joined CBS News as a senior producer for morning news. She later worked as an executive vice president of news and as a foreign editor. In 2018, Ciprian-Matthews became an executive vice president of strategic professional development. In January 2021, Ciprián-Matthews was selected by CBS News president Susan Zirinsky to oversee the CBS Washington bureau. In November 2021, she became the executive vice president of newsgathering.

Ciprián-Matthews was investigated in 2021 over favoritism and discriminatory hiring and management practices, as revealed by The New York Post in January 2024. In August 2023, following the resignation of Neeraj Khemlani, she was promoted to CBS News president. The United States House of Representatives announced an investigation into Ciprián-Matthews's firing of veteran reporter Catherine Herridge in February 2024, who had been probing the Hunter Biden laptop scandal, and the subsequent seizure of Herridge's personal records. On Monday, February 26, 2024, CBS News returned confidential files belonging to Herridge amid mounting pressure from the House Judiciary Committee and the union which represented her.

Ciprián-Matthews was selected by Radio Television Digital News Association to be among 13 honorees at the 33rd annual First Amendment Awards at The Watergate Hotel in Washington D.C. on March 9, 2024. She announced her resignation from the position of president on July 10, 2024, but will stay with CBS News "as a senior editorial adviser" until the elections in November.

== Family ==
She is married with two daughters.
