= Errol Barnett =

American television presenter

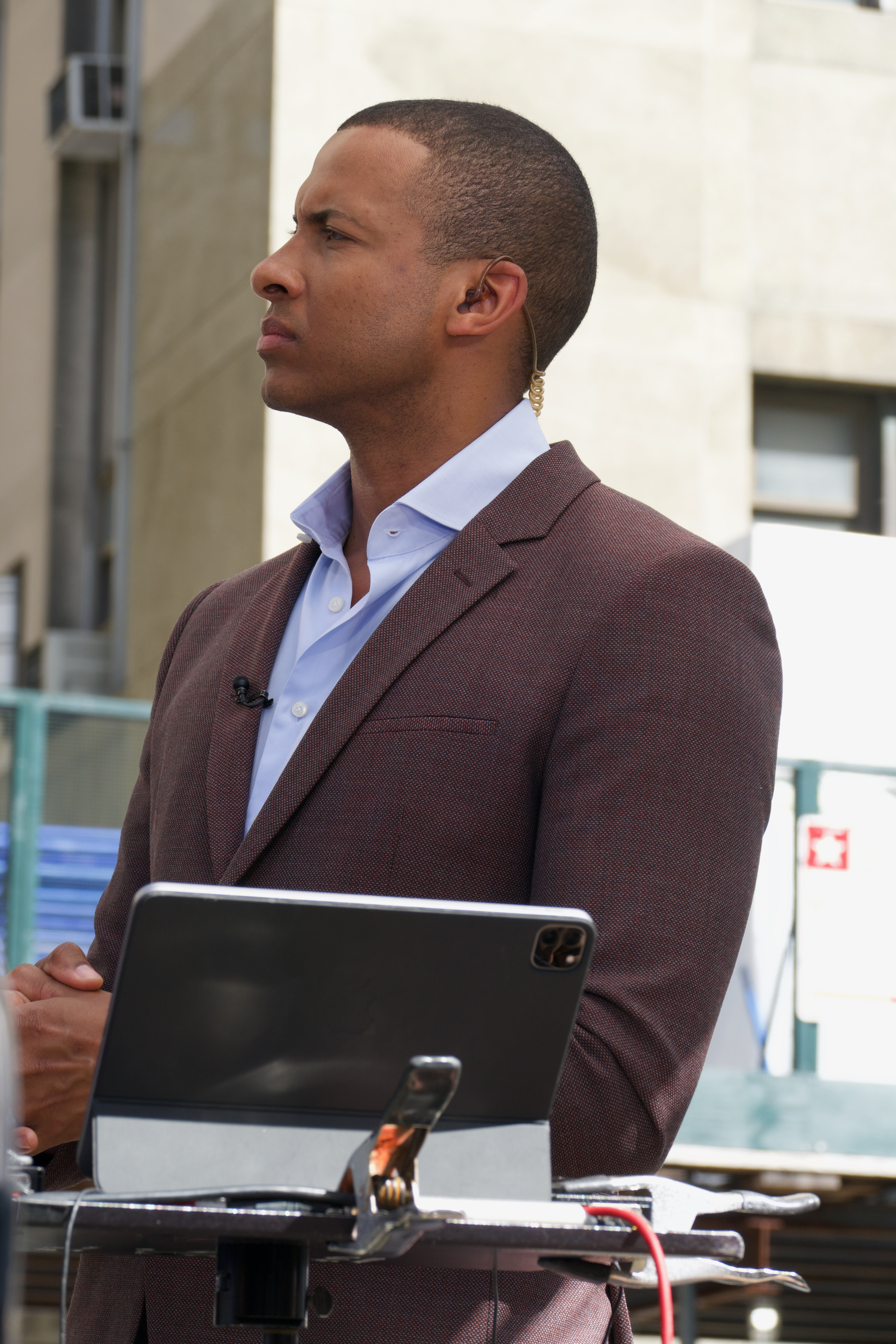
- Errol Barnett in May 2024 covering the criminal trial of Donald Trump outside the courthouse for CBS.
- Born: 3 April 1983 (age 43); Milton Keynes, England
- Education: B.A., UCLA, 2008
- Occupations: Anchor, correspondent
- Years active: 2001–present
- Employer: CNN (2008–2016); CBS News (2016–present)
- Website: www.errolbarnett.com

Errol Barnett (born 3 April 1983) is a broadcaster on American television. The Emmy Award winner is an anchor and national correspondent for CBS News based in New York City. He currently anchors the CBS Morning News on CBS News 24/7. He previously covered the Trump administration in Washington D.C., anchored CNN Newsroom and hosted the cultural affairs program Inside Africa. Barnett is invited to discuss his reporting on global issues and solutions at major forums for organizations like the UN, the Milken Institute and the Smithsonian.

== Early life ==
Errol Barnett was born in Milton Keynes, England to Michael Christie and Pamela, an English woman from Liverpool. Gladstone Christie, his Jamaican grandfather, was one of 500 Caribbean aircrew serving with the British Royal Air Force during WWII, afterward relocating to England as part of the Windrush generation. Barnett has English, German and Jamaican heritage. He has one older brother, Danny, and older sister, Natalie, who died.

His mother later married Gary Barnett, a US Air Force sergeant who served in the Gulf War before moving the family to Phoenix. After spending the first decade of his life in England, Barnett attended Garden Lakes Elementary and Westview High School, in Avondale, Arizona, before Channel One News hired him in 2001 relocating to Los Angeles.

== Channel One and UCLA ==
The youth oriented Channel One hired Barnett, their youngest anchor/reporter at age 18, to work alongside Maria Menounos, Seth Doane, Gotham Chopra among others. While also in college, Barnett covered Barack Obama's breakout DNC keynote speech, reported from the United Nations when Colin Powell presented flawed WMD intelligence and from the US Capitol during passage of the Homeland Security Act.

Barnett was chosen as one of Teen People magazine's "20 Teens Who Will Change The World". After being accepted to UCLA he left Channel One to complete his undergraduate studies. At UCLA Barnett received a Bachelor of Arts degree in political science with a focus on international relations. After graduation he was hired by CNN.

== CNN (2008 - 2016) ==
CNN initially assigned Barnett to report on the rise in influence of social media and in 2008 he was part of the most viewed streaming event in history during President Obama's Inauguration on CNN.com. In 2010, he anchored at noon ET on CNN International from CNN Abu Dhabi focusing on the Arab Spring, which was part of the network's Peabody-award winning coverage. As a CNN foreign correspondent, he was based in Johannesburg, South Africa covering the death of Nelson Mandela the Oscar Pistorius murder trial and various miner strikes.

=== Inside Africa ===
Barnett also hosted the network's longest running feature program Inside Africa from 2011 to 2014. During his time at the helm of the award-winning show Barnett reported from twenty-two countries including Senegal, Morocco, Ethiopia, and Madagascar. The weekly half-hour documentary earned awards for its depiction of the continent, with Barnett styling the program as a "journey of discovery."

=== CNN Newsroom ===
While based in Atlanta, Georgia Barnett anchored CNN Newsroom leading coverage of the Ferguson, Missouri protests, death of Robin Williams and the lead up to the 2016 presidential election. He became an Internet meme during coverage of protests with viewers noting Barnett's response to his co-anchor's suggestion that police use water cannons on demonstrators. Buzzfeed described Barnett's "side-eye" expression as "did that just happen" and "is this real life?"

== CBS News (2016 - present) ==
CBS News hired Barnett during the 2016 election as a Washington, D.C.–based correspondent and anchor appearing on CBS This Morning, the CBS Evening News and Face the Nation. Currently, he is based in New York City as a national correspondent and solo anchor of CBS Morning News airing daily on the channel's national streaming network. His coverage includes the Presidencies of Donald Trump and Joe Biden, artificial intelligence, extreme weather and various breaking news events. He also conducts high-interest interviews; his chat with Wikipedia's top editor was viewed more than two million times.

=== Secret Service incident ===
In 2018, the Secret Service issued a rare statement after a viral interaction with Barnett, following the murder of journalist Jamal Khashoggi. As Barnett asked then-Presidential advisor Jared Kushner about his relationship with the Saudi Crown Prince, Mohammad Bin Salman, a Secret Service agent "physically prevented" him. As the Washington Post reported, "Barnett can be seen attempting to ask Kushner a question as he makes his way off the plane, before a Secret Service agent appears to block his way. Barnett can then be seen showing his CBS and White House press credentials to one of the agents, who responds, 'I don't give a damn who you are, there's a time and a place.'"

In response to the backlash, the USSS said, "the actions were taken solely in response to an abrupt movement by an unknown individual who later identified themselves as a member of the media." On CNN's The Lead with Jake Tapper, Barnett responded "the video speaks for itself".

=== Joe Biden interview ===
During the 2020 U.S. Presidential election then-Vice President Joe Biden called Barnett a "junkie" in response to his question about cognitive abilities. As part of a joint virtual convention between NABJ and NAHJ, Barnett asked Biden if he had taken a cognitive test, as his opponent, President Donald Trump, insisted.

Biden replied, "No, I haven't taken a test. Why the hell would I take a test? Come on, man. That's like saying to you, before you got on this program if you had taken a test, were you taking cocaine or not? What do you think, huh? Are you a junkie?" Barnett pressed again to which Biden responded, "Well, if he can't figure out the difference between an elephant and a lion, I don't know what the hell he's talking about." The exchange was widely cited in the national press.

=== CBS Morning News ===
In 2024, Barnett was named the anchor of the CBS Morning News, airing weekdays at 7 a.m. ET on CBS News 24/7. Forbes wrote that this places "Barnett in a class of anchors that include his colleagues Nate Burleson and Vladimir Duthiers, along with Craig Melvin, Al Roker, Bryant Gumbel, and Michael Strahan." Variety called him a "veteran of CBS and CNN... who also worked as a fill-in on “CBS Mornings,” “CBS Saturday Morning” and the “CBS Weekend News,” and he has examined issues pertaining to technology, including documentary features examining cryptocurrency mining and the growth of e-sports." In a 2025 Hollywood Reporter/Morning Consult poll, Barnett was found to be one of the most trusted news anchors at CBS News.

== Speaker and Moderator ==
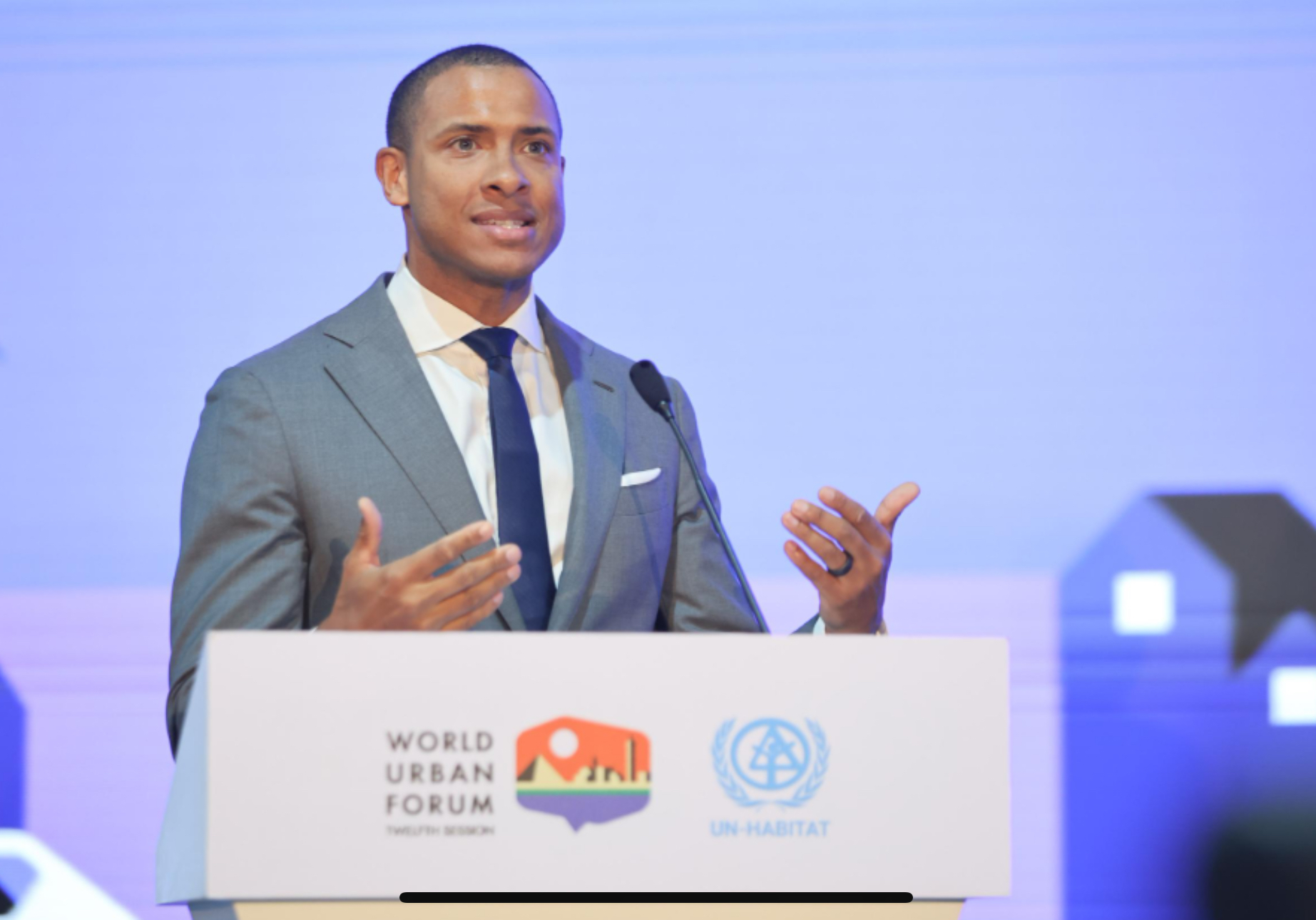
Errol Barnett addressing the UN's World Urban Forum in Cairo, Egypt. Nov. 2024.

Barnett regularly moderates discussions and speaks at conferences on the topics of freedom of the press, U.S. politics and various international issues. Events have included:

- UN Habitat – World Urban Forum, Cairo, Egypt (2024)
- ICON Mann Honors – Oscars week Gala, Los Angeles (2023)
- NABJ/NAHJ – Salute to Excellence Awards Gala, Las Vegas, NV (2022)
- Smithsonian – Exclusive Preview, 1,000 Years Of Slavery, Martha's Vineyard (2021)
- FOCOS – Annual Gala, New York (2018)
- Society of Professional Journalists – Annual Awards Dinner, Washington, D.C. (2018)
- Milken Institute – Global Conference, Los Angeles (2017)
- NABJ/NAHJ – Conference, Washington, D.C. (2016)
- International Press Institute – Conference, Johannesburg, South Africa (2014);
- World Bank – Conference, Johannesburg, South Africa (2012);
- International Press Institute Conference, Vienna, Austria (2010).
