= See It Now Studios =

Documentary production subsidiary of CBS Studios

- Type: Division
- Industry: Television production
- Founded: July 8, 2021; 5 years ago
- Founder: Susan Zirinsky
- Headquarters: New York, United States
- Owner: Skydance Corporation
- Parent: CBS News (2021–2026); CBS Studios (2026–present)
- Website: www.skydance.com/about/brands/see-it-now-studios

See It Now Studios is the documentary and non-fiction production label of CBS Studios which is owned by Skydance Corporation, and formerly the non-scripted production arm of CBS News, leaded by Susan Zirinsky the documentary studio develops and produces original documentaries and docuseries for Skydance's streaming service Paramount+ and its network CBS alongside producing docuseries for other platforms.

== History ==
The documentary division was established in September 2021, when CBS News announced it had launched its own premium documentary & docuseries production unit entitled See It Now Studios, taking the name from its 1950s news magazine of the same name. The new documentary production arm See It Now Studios would produce non-scripted & docuseries programming for steaming service Paramount+, CBS and other platforms such as Netflix with CBS News' former news president Susan Zirinsky.

In October 2026, when See It Now Studios' parent CBS News & owner Paramount Skydance merged with Warner Bros. Discovery to become Skydance, See It Now Studios had been moved from CBS News to CBS Studios as it became CBS Studios' specialized non-fiction & unscripted production label when Skydance had officially launched its new television production arm that would house CBS Studios, named Skydance TV Studios Group, with Susan Zirinsky now reporting to the president of CBS Studios, David Straf.

== Filmography ==
Title	Years	Network	Notes
Indivisible: Healing Hate	2022	Paramount+	co-production with XG Productions
Gilshaine: Partner in Crime	2022	Paramount+	co-production with Fremantle
Never Seen Again	2022–present	Paramount+	co-production with Efran Films
11 Minutes	2022	Paramount+	co-production with All Rise Films and Center Drive Media
The Checkup with Dr. David Agus	2022	Paramount+	co-production with Skydance Television
FBI True	2023–present	Paramount+/CBS	co-production with Anne Beagan Productions, Thinking Hat Inc. and Efran Films
Crush	2023	Paramount+	co-production with Triage Entertainment and All Rise Films
Ctrl+Alt+Desire	2024	Paramount+	co-production with Ark
Pillowcase Murders	2024	Paramount+	
The Carters: Hurts to Love You	2025	Paramount+	co-production with Candle True Stories
Murder 360	2025–present	Paramount+	co-production with FirstLook TV
Thirst Trap: The Fame. The Fantasy. The Fallout	2025	Paramount+	co-production with APG Pictures and Pyramid Productions
Don’t Date Brandon	2025	Paramount+	co-production with Wag Entertainment
My Nightmare Stalker: The Eva LaRue Story	2025	Paramount+	co-production with Forte Entertainment
