= University of Management and Technology =

University of Management and Technology may refer to:

- Tunku Abdul Rahman University of Management and Technology, Malaysia
- University of Management and Technology, Lahore, Pakistan
- University of Management and Technology, Virginia, United States
