= The Checkup with Dr. David Agus =

2022 American TV series

- Genre: Documentary
- Directed by: Adam Goldfried
- Presented by: David Agus
- Country of origin: United States
- Original language: English

Production
- Executive producers: Amy Coleman; David Agus; David Ellison; Dana Goldberg; Susan Zirinsky; Terence Wrong
- Cinematography: Sam Painter
- Editor: Eric Clawson
- Camera setup: Multi-camera
- Running time: 27–36 minutes
- Production companies: Skydance Television; See It Now Studios

Original release
- Network: Paramount+
- Release: December 6 – December 12, 2022

The Checkup with Dr. David Agus is an American documentary television series starring Dr. David Agus as he explores personal health issues with celebrities and their emotional breakthrough. The show is produced by Skydance Television and See It Now Studios, and premiered on Paramount+ on December 6, 2022.

== Cast ==
- David Agus
- Ashton Kutcher
- Michael Kutcher
- Amy Schumer
- Jane Fonda
- Lily Tomlin
- Nick Cannon
- Howie Mandel
- Maria Shriver
- Oprah Winfrey

== Episodes ==
No.	Title	Original release date
1	"Ashton & Michael Kutcher"	December 6, 2022
Kutcher talks about his terrifying battle with a rare life-threatening disease and sits for his first interview with twin brother Michael, who was born with cerebral palsy and had a heart transplant.
2	"Oprah Winfrey & Maria Shriver"	December 6, 2022
3	"Howie Mandel"	December 6, 2022
4	"Amy Schumer"	December 12, 2022
5	"Nick Cannon"	December 12, 2022
6	"Jane Fonda & Lily Tomlin"	December 12, 2022

== Release ==
The first three episodes were released on December 6, 2022, and the final three were released on December 12.
