= Frank Kearns =

American journalist

- Born: November 28, 1917; Gary, Indiana
- Died: 1986; New York City
- Education: West Virginia University
- Occupation: Foreign correspondent for CBS News
- Known for: Covered wars in Africa; faced death 114 times before he stopped counting
- Spouse(s): Gwendoline Ethel Shoring, Sara de Maine Kearns
- Children: 1

Frank Kearns (1917–1986) was an American broadcast journalist for CBS News from 1958 until 1971, although he first began with CBS in 1953 as a freelance correspondent, or "stringer", stationed in Cairo, Egypt.

During World War II, he was assigned to the US Army Counterintelligence Corps (CIC) in London in 1942. He was "named head of counterintelligence in Paris and enter[ed] Dachau with the 45th Division in April 1945."

In 1953, he became a radio stringer in Cairo, where he met up with "former CIC roommates from London, James Eichelberger and Miles Copeland Jr."

Kearns covered several Middle East conflicts including Egypt's Suez Crisis and the Arab-Israeli Six-Day War. For his 1957 coverage of Algeria's struggle for independence from the French where he was embedded with the freedom fighters for six weeks, Kearns was honored with a Peabody Award for providing "news in depth by going behind current happenings to identify related problems and underlying causes," the George Polk Memorial Award for "distinguished achievement in journalism," and the Overseas Press Club of America Award for "Best Foreign Reporting on Radio and Television" for his critical contributions to the CBS documentary "Algeria Aflame."

He was named a network staff correspondent with CBS on September 25, 1958. He reported from news bureaus in London, Paris, Moscow and Rome. Four years later, he was named the CBS News Africa Bureau Chief. From a base in London, he reported on numerous wars and disputes including Rhodesia’s bid for independence, the civil war in Biafra and the bloody conflicts in the Congo Crisis.

In 1971, Kearns left CBS News to accept a teaching position at his alma mater West Virginia University, where he served as a distinguished Benedum Professor of Journalism.

In 1976, Sig Mickelson, the former president of CBS News, told a U. S. Senate committee that during his early years as a “stringer” (part-time reporter) in Egypt, Kearns had U.S. Central Intelligence Agency "connections." In addition, the press alleged that the CIA relationship had been approved by senior CBS management.

In 1983, Kearns retired from the classroom and settled in Sardinia, Italy, where he spent the last three years of his life. Frank Kearns died of cancer on August 1, 1986, at age 68 at Memorial Sloan-Kettering Cancer Center in New York City. In announcing his death on The CBS Evening News, Dan Rather remarked, "His reporting on CBS radio and television came mostly from datelines such as Baghdad, Khartoum, Yemen and the Congo. He took the tough stories and never complained...Legend may be an overworked word among journalists, but in his quiet, courageous way, Frank Kearns was one around here."
