= Peter Kalischer =

American journalist

Peter Kalischer (December 25, 1915 – July 5, 1991) was an American journalist best known for his reporting of the early stages of the Vietnam War in the 1960s as a television correspondent for CBS News.

== Career ==
Kalischer covered the Korean War as the war correspondent from United Press, writing multiple articles about it.

He won the Overseas Press Club award in 1963 for his reporting during the Buddhist crisis that led to the fall of President Ngo Dinh Diem of South Vietnam. In 1968, while covering the Tet Offensive, he had dinner on the rooftop restaurant of the Caravelle Hotel with Walter Cronkite who was preparing a special report on the war and helped to convince him that the war could not be won militarily, that a stalemate was inevitable. From 1966 to 1978, Kalischer was the Paris correspondent and bureau chief for CBS News.

Kalischer later became a professor of communications at Loyola University, a position he held until 1982.

He is survived by his wife, Gloria Uemura, and two sons.

== Bibliography ==
Incomplete

=== Articles ===
- Kalischer, Peter (15 January 1949). "Hot Jidosha". The New Yorker. Vol. 24, no. 47. pp. 58–63.
- Kalischer, Peter (24 June 1955). "'Mr. Attack' goes to Washington". Collier's. 135 (13): 27–31.
- Kalischer, Peter (2 March 1956). "Japan". Collier's. 137 (5): 58–65.
