= Liz Trotta =

American journalist and conservative commentator

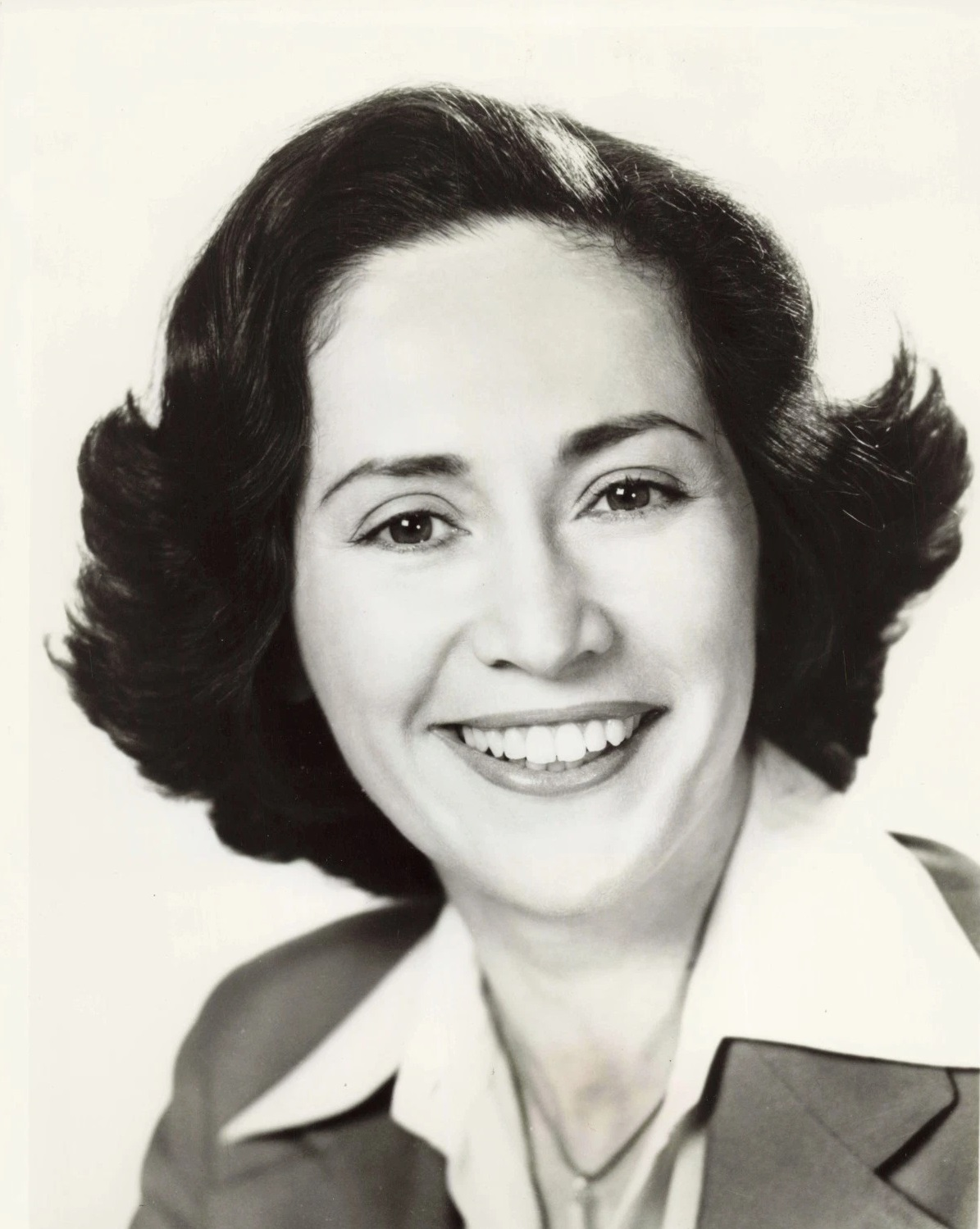
- Trotta in 1984
- Born: Elizabeth Trotta; March 28, 1937 (age 89); New Haven, Connecticut, U.S.
- Occupation: Television journalist
- Years active: 1965–present

Elizabeth Trotta (born 28 March 1937) is an American journalist and conservative commentator.

== Life and career ==
External videos
- Booknotes interview with Trotta on Fighting for Air: In the Trenches with Television News, August 18, 1991, C-SPAN

Trotta was born in New Haven, Connecticut. Her parents, Gaetano "Thomas" Trotta, a successful pharmacist, and Lillian Theresa Mazzacane, were both Catholics who had emigrated from Italy. Trotta had a sister, Mary L. Juba, who died in 2002.

Trotta is a Fox News contributor and the former New York City bureau chief of The Washington Times. She began her career in 1965, covering the Vietnam War as a correspondent for NBC News and later working for CBS News. Trotta has taught journalism at Stern College of Yeshiva University. She has won three Emmy awards and two Overseas Press Club awards, and is a graduate of Columbia University Graduate School of Journalism. Trotta also holds a bachelor's degree in English literature from Boston University.

== Controversy ==
On 25 May 2008, Trotta expressed on Fox News what some could claim as an apparent desire that presidential candidate Barack Obama be "knocked off" prior to the 2008 United States presidential election. While speaking about Hillary Clinton's reference to Robert F. Kennedy's assassination, Trotta said:

... and now we have what some are reading as a suggestion that somebody knock off Osama. Um, uh, Obama. Well, both, if we could.

Trotta apologized the next day. A petition demanding that Trotta be fired was soon up on Care2 gathering over 14,000 signatures.

In October 2011, Liz Trotta mocked the participants in Occupy Wall Street for being "people who like good weather" who spout "the ravings of what sounds like the Unabomber."

In February 2012, she made remarks on Fox News suggesting that women in the military should not be surprised by the increase in sexual assaults by members of the army. In direct response to a Pentagon report that indicated a 64% increase in sexual assault in the military, Trotta said, "Now, what did they expect?" She went on to say that women "have demanded too much money to fund [military] programs for sexual abuse victims.” Trotta responded to criticism of her comments the following week.

== Publications ==
- Jude, HarperOne, 2005, ISBN 978-0060756970.
