= Maureen Maher =

American television reporter

- Born: 1967 (age 58–59); Detroit, Michigan, U.S.
- Education: Loyola University
- Occupations: News anchor, reporter, correspondent of 48 Hours Mystery

Maureen Maher (born 1967) is an American television news reporter and correspondent. She is primarily known as one of the hosts of the CBS program 48 Hours.

== Early life ==
Maher was born in the state of Michigan, just outside Detroit. Her birth parents were high school seniors unable to provide for Maureen and subsequently gave her up for adoption. In 1991, she graduated from Loyola University with a Bachelor of Arts degree in communications.

== Career ==
Maureen Maher started her broadcasting career with Chicago-based radio station WLUW (FM) as a morning-drive news anchor in 1991. Maher then moved to Detroit in 1992, where she worked as a reporter for Detroit-based TV station WJBK-TV and CBS-owned radio station WWJ (AM) until 1995. In 1995–97, Maher worked as a news anchor for WJRT-TV in Flint, Michigan, covering breaking news, including the Oklahoma City bombing and the Decker farm raid. From 1997 to 2002, she was a Chicago-based CBS Newspath correspondent and covered notable stories such as the impeachment of Bill Clinton, the Kosovo crisis and the release of US servicemen in Albania.

Maher then moved to Dallas and worked as a CBS News correspondent from 1999 to 2002. She reported for CBS Evening News on the war on terror, the fall of the Taliban in Afghanistan, the 2002 Kenyan hotel bombing, the Enron scandal and US natural disasters.

Maher reported on the Scott Peterson murder trial and a 2003 Chicago porch collapse resulting in 13 deaths. In 2003, Maher was assigned to host 48 Hours Mystery, a CBS true crime documentary and news program broadcast.
