= Wendy McMahon (television executive) =

CBS News and Stations head (2021–2025)

- McMahon at the 2026 Status Summit
- Born: Wendy Ann McMahon; October 11, 1974 (age 52); New Orleans, Louisiana, U.S.
- Education: Louisiana State University (BA)
- Spouse: William Burton
- Children: 1

Wendy Ann McMahon (born October 11, 1974) is an American television executive who served as the president and CEO of CBS News and Stations from 2021–2025, the division of the CBS television network that runs CBS News and its owned-and-operated television stations, as well as CBS Media Ventures, its domestic syndication arm.

McMahon started her career in television in Savannah, Georgia, working as a promotions manager and creative services director in several markets, the last being Los Angeles. She later oversaw digital content for the eight ABC Owned Television Stations, and was named president of the group in 2017. She moved to CBS in 2021, becoming the co-president of CBS News and Stations, and became sole president and CEO of the division in 2023, from which she resigned in May 2025.

== Education ==
McMahon graduated summa cum laude in mass communication – broadcast journalism from Louisiana State University

== Career ==
McMahon worked as a promotion manager at WTOC-TV in Savannah, Georgia then as the promotions director at KXAN-TV in Austin, Texas, and the creative services director of CBS-owned WCCO-TV in Minneapolis. In 2006, she moved to creative services director at the CBS-owned station WBZ-TV in Boston. Months after arriving in Boston, she led a rebrand of the station from CBS4 back to WBZ.

After seven years within the CBS stations group, McMahon was hired by KABC-TV in Los Angeles to serve as vice president for programming and creative services. She was later elevated to senior vice president responsible for digital content and product technology for all eight ABC Owned Television Stations and in December 2017 to president of the group. Broadcasting & Cable magazine named the ABC stations its Station Group of the Year in 2020, citing initiatives including hiring community journalists; the launch of the Localish brand and digital subchannel; and the rollout of mobile apps for streaming across the station group.

In 2021, McMahon left ABC to become the co-president of CBS News and Stations, which was newly reorganized as a fusion of the local and national news divisions. The two have become more closely aligned, and McMahon also oversaw the launch of new or expanded local news programming in Detroit and Los Angeles. She served alongside Neeraj Khemlani until he resigned in August 2023, at which time CBS appointed McMahon as the sole president and CEO of the division, in addition to leadership of CBS Media Ventures.

In May 2025, McMahon announced her resignation from CBS News amid tensions between the network and President Donald Trump, which included a lawsuit brought by Trump that accused 60 Minutes of deceptively editing an interview of Kamala Harris in order to boost her campaign prospects.

=== CBS News and Stations details ===
==== Co-presidency of CBS News and Stations ====
In April 2021, CBS named Neeraj Khemlani, who had worked at ABC and CBS including as a producer on 60 Minutes, and McMahon as co-presidents of the newly combined CBS News and Stations division. The merger of News and Stations came in the aftermath of the departure of the executives that had been running the CBS television stations, Peter Dunn and David Friend, over harassment and preferential treatment issues.

Since the merger, the national and local news operations have engaged in several joint efforts. On January 2022, the CBSN local and national streaming channels were rebranded as CBS News as part of efforts to more deeply integrate local and national reportage. That same month, CBS launched a Local News and Innovation Lab in Fort Worth, Texas, to produce newscasts featuring national and local segments for its independent and The CW-affiliated stations in ten markets. That June, the national investigative unit and the News and Innovation Lab in Fort Worth debuted a reporting series, Crime Without Punishment, which included reports in the local markets as well as a 30-minute national streaming documentary.

Since the reorganization, several CBS-owned markets have seen major changes. In December 2021, CBS announced it would start a news operation in Detroit, where its station, WWJ-TV, had not aired local evening newscasts since 2002. This occurred after the station's vice president and general manager approached McMahon about the idea, an overture that she found surprising because such a proposal "never happens". The first newscasts from CBS News Detroit launched on January 2023, with the initial evening news programs being augmented by a morning newscast that launched a month later.

Another market where the local news was overhauled was Los Angeles, where CBS owns KCBS-TV and news-intensive independent station KCAL-TV. On July 2022, the network announced that KCAL would introduce a new seven-hour morning newscast, from 4:00 a.m. to 11:00 am; KCBS would instead air the live East Coast broadcast of CBS Mornings from 4 to 6 a.m. PT, followed by a simulcast of the 6 a.m. hour of the KCAL morning show, and then the West Coast edition of CBS Mornings. McMahon cited the "growth opportunity" from replacing KCAL's early morning lineup of paid programming with its first-ever morning news program. CBS also bolstered the Los Angeles local news operation by transferring veteran correspondent Jamie Yuccas from CBS News to KCAL. Concurrently with the changes, CBS rebranded newscasts on both stations as KCAL News, trading on the news image of the latter. In other markets, the local stations were rebranded to bring them more in line with the existing look of CBS national news, sports, and entertainment.

In 2022, when CBS sold most of its stake in The CW to Nexstar Media Group, the transaction included withdrawing its eight CW affiliates from the network in September 2023.

==== President of CBS News and Stations ====
On August 13, 2023, Khemlani resigned. The next day, CBS announced that McMahon would become the sole president and CEO of CBS News and Stations as well as the president of CBS Media Ventures, which distributes programs including Jeopardy! and Wheel of Fortune; the president of the latter, Steve LoCascio, simultaneously announced his retirement after 34 years.

On May 19, 2025, McMahon resigned as CBS News CEO citing disagreements with the company on a path forward. The company had been facing a lawsuit brought by Trump that accused 60 Minutes of deceptively editing an interview of Kamala Harris in order to boost her campaign prospects. According to The New York Times, Paramount executives "wanted her to step down".

== Personal life ==
McMahon is married to William Burton. They have a son.
