= Paula Reid =

American journalist

- Born: August 19, 1982 (age 44); Akron, Ohio, U.S.
- Education: College of William & Mary (BA); Villanova University (JD); University of Pennsylvania (MBE)
- Occupation: Journalist
- Years active: 2010–present
- Spouse: Jason Kolsevich
- Children: 2

Paula Reid (born August 19, 1982) is an American journalist and attorney who is the MS NOW Chief White House Reporter. She joined MS NOW in October 2026 after working at CBS News and CNN. She is based in Washington, D.C.

As CBS News White House correspondent she appeared regularly on CBS Evening News, Face the Nation, and CBS This Morning. She was also a fill-in anchor on CBSN.

Reid covered the Special Counsel investigation of Robert Mueller and the 2016 Hillary Clinton email controversy. During the COVID-19 pandemic, Reid became known for pressing President Trump on his response to the crisis.

== Early life and education ==
Reid was born in Akron, Ohio. In 2005, Reid earned her bachelor's degree with a dual degree in psychology and English from the College of William & Mary. In 2008, Reid graduated from Villanova University School of Law with a Juris Doctor. Reid passed the bar exams in New Jersey and Pennsylvania. In 2016, Reid also completed a master's degree in Bioethics (MBE) from the Department of Medical Ethics and Health Policy at the University of Pennsylvania.

== Career ==
=== CBS News ===
In January 2010, Reid moved to New York City and was hired as an intern at CBS News in their Investigative Unit. Later that year in June 2010, she became a production secretary for CBS Evening News, a position she held for a year. From 2011 to 2014, Reid worked as a digital journalist based out of New York.

In 2014, Reid moved to Washington, D.C., to cover the Justice Department as a reporter for CBS News. Reid covered the 2016 Hillary Clinton email controversy. She was one of the few reporters on the ground in Charlottesville, Virginia, during the Unite the Right rally, which resulted in a state of emergency being declared by Governor Terry McAuliffe.

Reid led the CBS News coverage of the Special Counsel investigation of Robert Mueller. She also began filling in as a reporter at the White House in 2017. During one of the White House press briefings, Press Secretary Sarah Huckabee Sanders stated that Donald Trump could fire Mueller if he wanted to. Reid pointed out that this was not legally permitted, "You said the president believes he has the power to fire Robert Mueller. Because usually most legal experts believe that he would have to order Deputy Attorney General Rod Rosenstein to fire Mueller, and Rosenstein could, of course, refuse."

In 2018, Reid pressed Trump on his border policies. This involved pointing out that, contrary to what Trump claimed, the Trump administration family separation policy was different from that of previous administrations as the Trump policy prosecuted all individuals who arrived at the border.

=== CBS White House Correspondent ===
In April 2019, after two years of covering the beat, Reid was officially named the CBS News White House Correspondent. During the COVID-19 pandemic, Reid attended the daily Trump press briefings. In April 2020 she asked why the Trump administration had been so slow to respond to the COVID-19 pandemic. In particular, Reid asked what meaningful preparation Trump had done during the month after bringing in his China travel ban. "But what did you do with that time? You didn’t use it to prepare hospitals, you didn’t use it to ramp up testing. Right now, nearly 20 million are unemployed, tens of thousands of Americans are dead.”

In May 2020, President Trump complained about Reid's tough questioning to the New York Post, saying Reid was "Nothing like Donna Reed, I can tell you that."

Reid has worked on news broadcasts CBS Evening News, CBS This Morning, and Face the Nation.

In January 2021, CBS announced that Reid would move from the White House to the network's Washington office as part of a reshuffling of its correspondents lineup in both the White House and Congress.

=== CNN ===
In March 2021, Reid announced that she would be leaving CBS to join CNN as a senior legal affairs correspondent. She was promoted to CNN's chief legal affairs correspondent on October 16, 2023.

=== MS NOW ===
Reid left CNN in the summer of 2026 due to her concerns about its future journalistic independence under new corporate parent Skydance, and joined Versant corporation's MS NOW network as their Chief White House Reporter. Her initial White House reporting for MS NOW began during the 2026 mid-term election preview coverage on November 1, 2026, where she reported that some administration officials and Department of Justice lawyers were refocusing on garnering the favor of not just President Trump but also of his White House Deputy Chief of Staff for Policy and Homeland Security Advisor, Stephen Miller, because they believed Miller would become even more influential as a Trump advisor during the last two years of the president's second term.

== Personal life ==
Reid is married to Jason Kolsevich. The couple have a daughter who was born in 2022 and a second daughter born in 2025.
