= Catherine Herridge =

American journalist (born 1964)

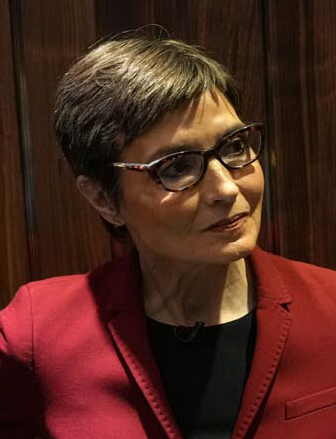
- Herridge in 2025
- Born: Catherine Victoria Herridge V May 18, 1964 (age 62); Toronto, Ontario, Canada
- Education: Harvard University (BA); Columbia University (MA)
- Occupations: Journalist, author
- Years active: 1986–present
- Employers: ABC News (1989–1996); Fox News (1996–2019); CBS News (2019–2024)
- Notable work: The Next Wave: On the Hunt for Al Qaeda's American Recruits; Organ donation advocacy
- Spouse: John Hayes (m. 2004)
- Children: 2
- Website: catherineherridgereports.com/subscribe

Catherine Herridge is a Canadian journalist who was a senior investigative correspondent for CBS News in Washington D.C. from 2019 to 2024. She began at CBS after leaving her role as chief intelligence correspondent for Fox News, which she joined at its inception in 1996. Herridge was among twenty CBS News employees who were laid off during budget cuts in February 2024, along with Jeff Glor, Jeff Pegues, Pamela Falk, and Christina Ruffini.

== Early life and education ==
Herridge was born in Toronto, Ontario, and attended Jarvis Collegiate Institute for high school before moving to the US for college. She earned a Bachelor's degree from Harvard College and a Master's degree in journalism from the Columbia University Graduate School of Journalism.

== Career ==
=== In Journalism ===
Initially a London-based correspondent for ABC News, Herridge joined the Fox News Channel at its inception in 1996. Herridge also served as a field correspondent for the now-defunct Fox newsmagazine The Pulse. At Fox, Herridge regularly covered stories centered on Hillary Clinton, including her campaign for Senate in 2000; she also produced notable coverage of the 2004 Democratic presidential primary, the D.C.-area sniper attacks, and the trial of Zacarias Moussaoui. Herridge was in New York on September 11, 2001, and reported for the network from locations in New York City.

In 2011, Herridge authored the book The Next Wave: On the Hunt for Al Qaeda's American Recruits.

On October 31, 2019, Fox News announced Herridge would be leaving the network shortly after being awarded the Tex McCrary Award for Journalism from the Congressional Medal of Honor Society for her enterprise reporting at Fox News. She then joined CBS News as a senior investigative correspondent later that year. Some CBS staffers and Democrats accused Herridge of promoting Republican talking points and conservative conspiracy theories. Daily Beast media reporter Maxwell Tani said Herridge at times got scoops with prominent Trump administration officials and asked "softball" questions, adding she was "considered a star in conservative media circles" but was "careful to never cross the line into overt advocacy." However, CNN anchor Jake Tapper and national security attorney Mark Zaid defended her work.

Herridge was one of twenty CBS News employees laid off on February 13, 2024, among 800 employees terminated by CBS parent Paramount Global. She had been probing the Hunter Biden laptop controversy. On Monday, February 26, 2024, CBS News returned confidential files belonging to Herridge amid mounting pressure from the House Judiciary Committee and SAG-AFTRA, the union which represented her.

== Legal dispute ==
Herridge is at the center of a dispute over a journalist's ability to protect secret sources. In 2017, Citing anonymous sources, Herridge reported on an FBI investigation of University of Management and Technology and its founder, Yanping Chen. The investigation had ended a year earlier, charges were never filed. Chen subsequently sued several government agencies, alleging that they had leaked information to Herridge in order to damage her reputation. Herridge's report had included information from government FBI documents and immigration forms, meaning her sources could have violated the Privacy Act of 1974 regulating the disclosure of personal data.

Chen's lawyers issued a subpoena for Herridge to disclose the names of her sources. Herridge refused to do so, and in February 2024 was held in contempt of court by Judge Christopher R. Cooper, who was overseeing Chen's lawsuit. The DC Circuit Court upheld the civil contempt citation in 2025 and in 2026 the Supreme Court declined to intervene.

Chen's lawyers allege that Herridge's sources violated the Privacy Act writing they "abused their access to sensitive records to harm a private citizen and laundered that corrupt, unlawful conduct through a reporter to escape detection." Herridge faces a $800 per day fine for refusing to disclose the source for her reporting of the investigation of Chen.

== Personal life ==
On June 6, 2006, she donated a portion of her liver to her infant son, who was diagnosed with biliary atresia.
