= University of Management and Technology (Virginia) =

Private university in the United States

Coordinates: 38°53′50.8″N 77°4′19.2″W

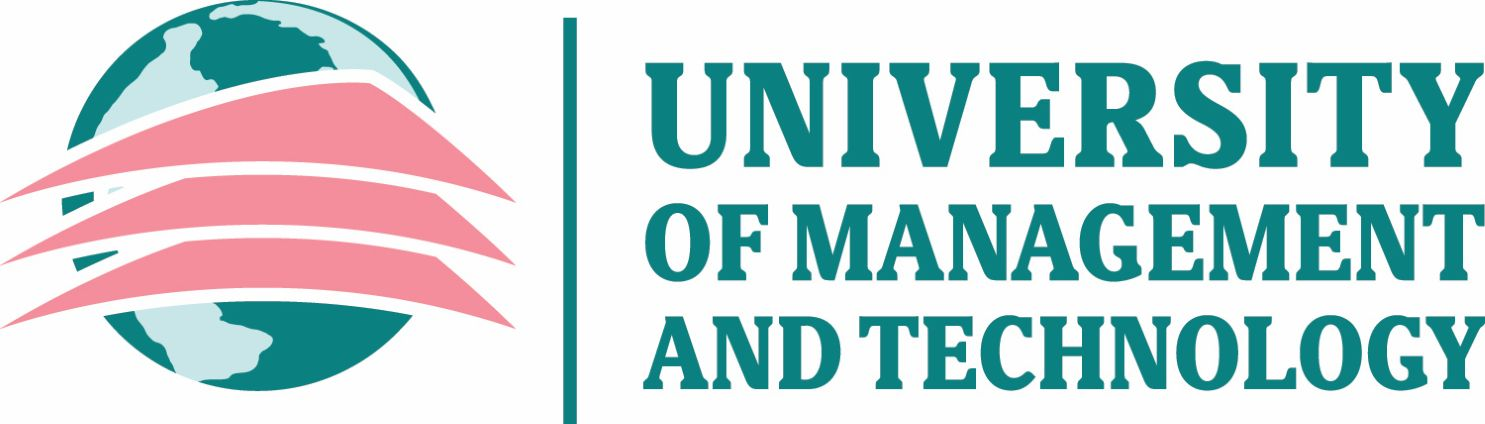
- Motto: Committed to building futures
- Type: Private for-profit
- Established: 1998
- President: Yanping Chen
- Provost: C Eric Kirkland
- Administrative staff: 69 (2019–2020)
- Students: 979 (Fall 2024)
- Undergraduates: 294 (Fall 2024)
- Postgraduates: 685 (Fall 2024)
- Location: Arlington, Virginia, United States
- Nickname: UMT
- Website: www.umtweb.edu

The University of Management and Technology (UMT) is a private for-profit online university headquartered in Arlington, Virginia, United States. It was founded in 1998 and offers associate, bachelor's, master's, and doctoral degrees as well as certificate programs.

== History ==
When the university was founded in 1998, Yanping Chen served as the founding president while Chen's husband, J. Davidson Frame, served as the founding dean of the university. Frame was a faculty member, program director, and department chair at George Washington University. Chen worked in China's space program before studying for her Master’s and Ph.D. at George Washington University and becoming a naturalized U.S. citizen.

At its inception, UMT offered two graduate degrees: an MBA and a Master of Science in Management (MSM) with a focus on project management. In 2003, it was authorized to offer a full range of degree programs, including the associate's, bachelor's, master's, and doctoral degrees.

UMT students reside in 50 states, the District of Columbia, 4 territories of the United States, and 78 countries. As of January 2025, UMT has provided various levels of education programs to 27,272 students. Of these, 16,727 have earned their degrees from UMT.

In 2017, the US Department of Defense banned the school from receiving government tuition assistance after a Fox News report by Catherine Herridge alleged that Chen was a former officer in the People's Liberation Army. A whistleblower told Herridge that sensitive information on US military members hosted by the school was accessible to the Chinese government. Chen was investigated by the US federal government for concealing her involvement with communist government institutions from immigration authorities but no charges were filed. Chen subsequently sued Herridge and the US government in a lawsuit that is ongoing.

== Academics ==
UMT offers a variety of degrees in disciplines such as management, business administration, health administration, computer science, information technology, homeland security, and criminal justice.

=== Authorization and accreditation ===
UMT is authorized to operate by the State Council of Higher Education for Virginia (SCHEV). It is accredited by the Distance Education Accrediting Commission (DEAC). UMT's project management degree programs are also accredited by the Global Accreditation Center of the Project Management Institute.

=== Financial aid ===
Since its inception in 1998, UMT has not increased its tuition fees, which have been $370 per credit hour of instruction for more than twenty years. UMT offers financial aid and scholarships, including a Military Scholarship to all active duty US military personnel and veterans, a First Responder Scholarship, and Project Management Institute Education Foundation Scholarships. UMT participates in federal loan and grant programs.
