= David Henderson (American journalist) =

American journalist

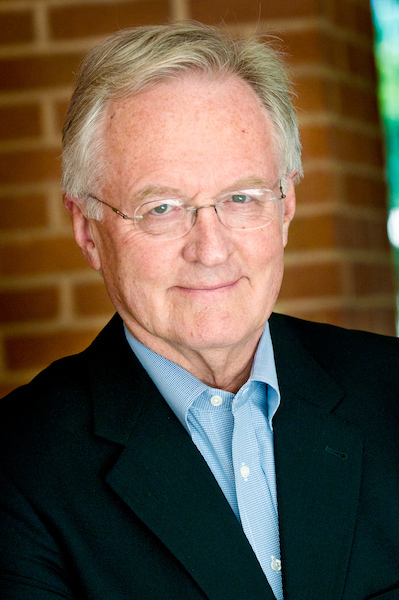
- David Henderson in 2011
- Education: George Mason University
- Occupation: Journalist
- Awards: Emmy Award
- Website: davidhenderson.com

David Henderson is an American television and radio journalist. He appeared on the CBS Evening News, CBS Morning News on the CBS Radio Network; and covered stories throughout the U.S. and Asia. He served as bureau chief, correspondent, and producer in Tokyo and Hong Kong and covered conflicts across Asia and the Middle East. On assignment from CBS News headquarters in New York, Henderson’s investigative news stories included an exposé of conditions in America’s cotton industry and workers who suffered from byssinosis or “brown lung disease,” (aka Byssinosis) caused by dust during cotton processing.
