= Susan Zirinsky =

American journalist and television news producer

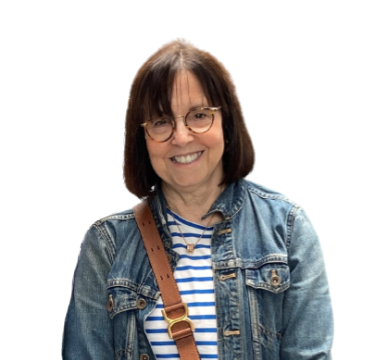
- Zirinsky in 2021
- Born: March 3, 1952 (age 74); New York City, U.S.
- Education: American University
- Occupations: Journalist, producer, executive
- Employer: CBS
- Title: President See It Now Studios (2021–present); President and Senior Executive Producer of CBS News (2019–2021); Senior Executive Producer, 48 Hours (1996–2019)
- Spouse: Joseph Peyronnin (m. 1984)
- Children: 1
- Awards: Two Peabody Awards; First Amendment Service; News & Documentary Emmy; Christopher Award; Edward R. Murrow

Susan Zirinsky (born March 3, 1952) is an American journalist and television news producer. She served as the President of CBS News from January 2019 until April 2021, when she was succeeded by Neeraj Khemlani and Wendy McMahon. She previously served as executive producer of 48 Hours from 1996 to 2019. In 2003, she won a Primetime Emmy Award as producer of the documentary 9/11, which aired on CBS in 2002.

In 2013, Zirinsky was given the Lifetime Achievement Award by the International Television & Film Awards.

As CBS News President and Senior Executive Producer, Zirinsky was responsible for CBS News broadcasts and the division's newsgathering across all platforms including television, CBS News Radio, CBSNews.com and CBSN. Zirinsky is the first female President and Senior Executive Producer of CBS News.

== Personal life ==
Zirinsky was born in New York City and raised in Neponsit, Queens, the daughter of Cynthia (née Finkelstein) and Richard Zirinsky (1915–2002). Her sister, Barbara Zirinsky Faden, died in 1999 at age 50 of cancer. Her mother founded Gracie Square Hospital in New York City and works as a mental health care professional. Her father was a New York City real-estate developer. Named after her parents for their philanthropy, the Richard and Cynthia Zirinsky Center for Bipolar Disorder is located at Mount Sinai Beth Israel. She married Joseph Peyronnin in 1984. Peyronnin is also a journalist and has won an Emmy Award. The couple covered the Tiananmen Square Massacre. In 1996 they adopted a baby girl from China.

Zirinsky graduated from the School of Communications at American University in Washington, D.C., and made a career in television journalism. In 2009, she delivered the 123rd Commencement Address, School of Communication at American University.

== Career at CBS ==
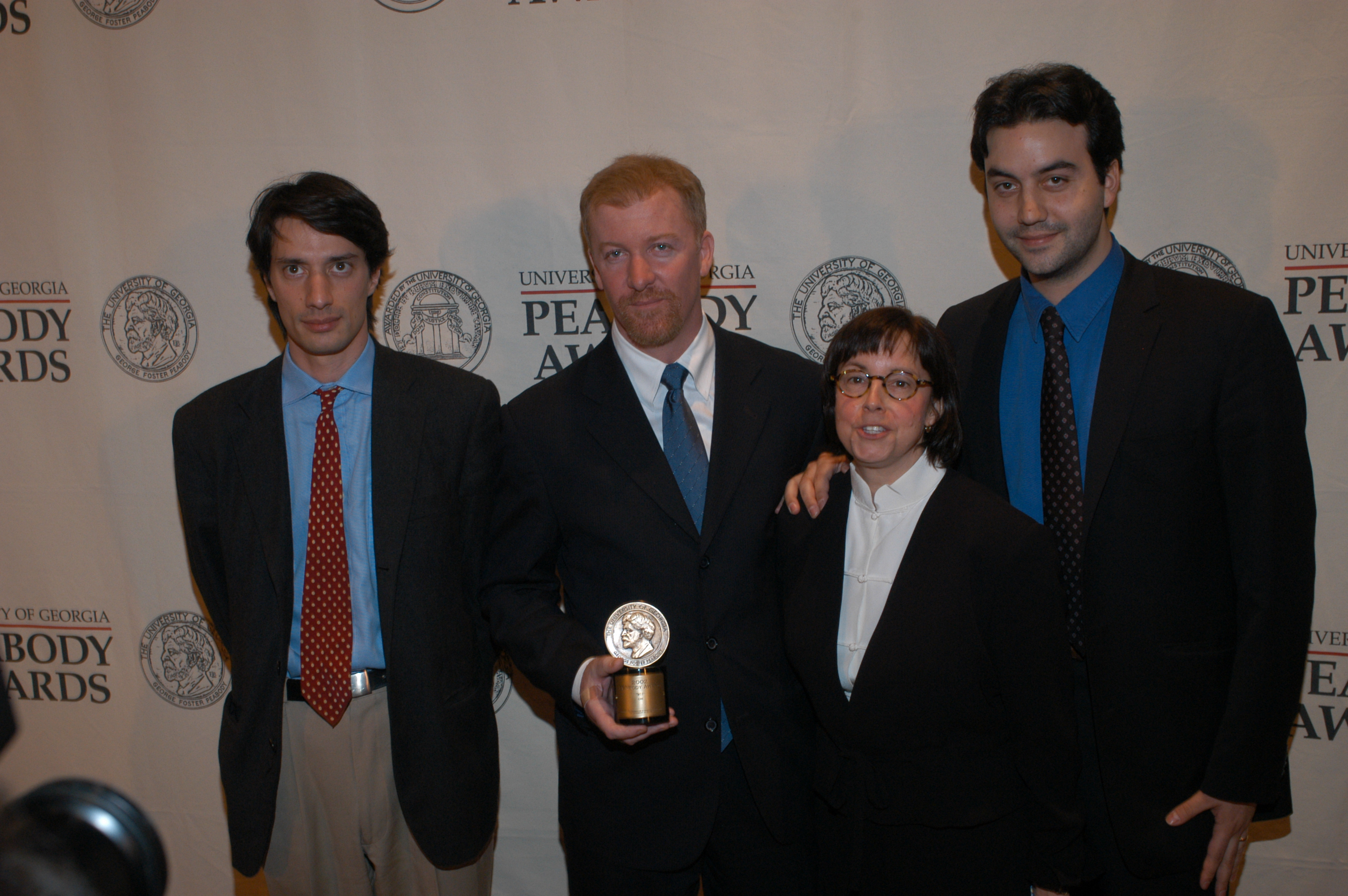
Gédéon Naudet, James Hanlon, Susan Zirinsky and Jules Naudet posing with the Peabody Award for their film 9/11, May 2003

Zirinsky, then a 20-year-old sophomore at American University, joined the CBS News Washington Bureau in 1972. She worked as a weekend production clerk. In her senior year, she helped write stories about the Watergate Scandal. She continued working in various roles for CBS after graduation.

Zirinsky was assigned to cover the White House for CBS, which she did for over a decade. During this time she worked with Marcy McGinnis and Lesley Stahl, who became her mentor. She has also specialized in covering political campaigns and war assignments. She went with Dan Rather to Kuwait during the Gulf War, where she produced the news, and Rather reported live from Kuwait City.

Zirinsky was the senior executive producer of '48 Hours'. She also produces breaking news specials for CBS News. Her frequent collaborators include Bob Schieffer. Her nickname in the newsroom is "Z".

On March 1, 2019, Zirinsky became the first female President and Senior Executive Producer of CBS News, replacing David Rhodes. Rhodes will step down as president of CBS News amid falling ratings and the fallout from revelations from an investigation into sexual misconduct allegations against CBS News figures, Rhodes and the CBS network said. She was first offered the position in 2011, however she turned the job down because it would have taken her away from the work she loves, which is producing.

Zirinsky is described as a media icon, legendary, and trail-blazing. She is the second woman to be appointed head of a broadcast news network. After Zirinsky was named president and senior executive producer of CBS News, employees said the mood was upbeat and hoped the appointment would boost morale after a scandal-plagued year. Zirinsky takes her assignment when CBS' longtime chief Les Moonves was forced out following a series of reports accusing him of sexual harassment. Charlie Rose was fired because of the same revelations and Jeff Fager, chief of 60 Minutes, was also forced out during Rose's departure.

The New York Times reported the employees at CBS greeted Zirinsky with a "roaring ovation." Gayle King, co-anchor, CBS This Morning, was quoted as saying, "I was doing the happy dance. ... She is a badass in every sense of the word."

The profession lacks female executives. In 167 years, The New York Times has had one female, The Washington Post and The Wall Street Journal are at zero. NBC News and Fox News have each had one female news executive and USA Today has had three female top editors, including the current Editor in Chief Nicole Carroll. On January 10, 2019, Showtime announced changes in the wake of Moonves being ousted at CBS. Jana Winograde became one of the new presidents of entertainment at the cable network.

Over the years, Zirinsky has worked with Dan Rather, Lesley Stahl and Ed Bradley. Zirinsky said she has never forgotten them and in her office there are photos of all three newscasters. In her role as president and Senior Executive Producer of CBS News, she is described as having to clean up after the bad boys, restore credibility at CBS, improve the ratings for the news programs that have seen their ratings slump, and chart the future for CBS News. With the announcement of Ryan Kadro, executive producer of CBS This Morning stepping down, high on her to-do list is finding a new executive producer for CBS This Morning. She was also charged with naming a full time permanent executive producer for 60 Minutes.

== After CBS ==
Susan Zirinsky is president of See It Now Studios, which she founded in 2021 after leaving the CBS News presidency. See It Now Studios is part of Paramount Global, which also owns CBS. The studio produced 51 hours of original nonfiction content in its first year primarily for the streaming service Paramount+."

== Broadcast News film ==
The 1987 film Broadcast News was based on Zirinsky's experience at the CBS News Washington Bureau in the early 1980s. She worked with director and screenwriter James L. Brooks and served as associate producer and technical advisor for the film. She also helped prepare actress Holly Hunter to portray her. Hunter job-shadowed Zirinsky and cut her hair into a bob cut to look similar to the producer. Zirinsky gave Hunter some of her clothes to wear in the film. Hunter was nominated for the Academy Award for Best Actress for her performance.

Zirinsky has attended screenings of the film for young journalists and lectured about her career and the making of the film.

== Select works ==
=== Associate Producer ===
- Broadcast News

=== Executive producer ===
- 9/11
- Elvis by the Presleys
- Britney & Kevin: Chaotic
- Beslan: Three Days in September
- Fashion's Night Out
- Vanity Fair's Hollywood
- That's The Way It Is: Cronkite at 90
- Mary Tyler Moore: Love Is All Around
- Princess Diana: Her Life—Her Death—The Truth
- In God's Name
- The Lord's Bootcamp
- That's The Way It Was: Remembering Cronkite
- Ted Kennedy: The Last Brother
- The Royal Wedding: Modern Majesty
- David Letterman: A Life on Television
- Spymasters: CIA in the Crosshairs
- Born in Synanon
- We Will Dance Again

=== Senior Executive Producer ===
- Whistleblower

== Awards and honors ==
- Two of Zirinsky's projects have won Peabody Awards for Excellence, 9/11 (2002), a documentary about the World Trade Center from the point of view of firefighters from a Lower Manhattan company, and 48 Hours: Heroes Under Fire.
- Zirinsky was given the First Amendment Service Award by the Radio Television and Digital News Foundation in 2003.
- Zirinsky won the News & Documentary Emmy Award for her work on three 48 Hours specials, Hostage, Grave Injustice, and Perilous Journey.
- Zirinsky won the Christopher Award for her work on 9/11 and In God's Name.
- Zirinsky's work on the 48 Hours: The Lost Children won an Edward R. Murrow Award in 2010.
- In 2013, Zirinsky was awarded the Lifetime Achievement Award by the International Television & Film Awards.
