= Marya McLaughlin =

American journalist (1929-1998)

- Born: December 29, 1929; Baltimore, Maryland, U.S.
- Died: September 14, 1998 (aged 68)
- Education: Catholic University of America; Marymount College, Tarrytown
- Occupation: Reporter
- Known for: CBS's first female television reporter

Marya McLaughlin (December 29, 1929 – September 14, 1998) was an American reporter who was CBS's first female television reporter.

== Biography ==
McLaughlin was born in 1929 in Baltimore, Maryland, and raised in Alexandria, Virginia. She graduated from St. Mary's Academy in Alexandria, then attended the Catholic University of America and Marymount College. Her first job was as a math teacher at Marymount. She joined her sister at CBS, working in a temporary position. She then worked on NBC's The Huntley–Brinkley Report and for the BBC before going back to CBS in 1963, originally to cover the election, and later as an associate producer, working on several films, including the documentary 1945. In 1965, she was sent to the New York Bureau, becoming CBS's first female reporter. Throughout the 1960s, she was one of the few women in television, along with Nancy Dickerson and Marlene Sanders, to have major on-air roles.

Several of McLaughlin's first stories were on the wives of the men working on the Gemini 4 space mission, and on the families of Lyndon B. Johnson and Richard Nixon. In 1971, she was promoted from general assignment reporter to news correspondent. The new position led her to cover politics, including the Watergate scandal. Several of the television shows that she appeared in as a news correspondent were CBS Evening News with Walter Cronkite, Face the Nation and CBS Morning News. Until her retirement in 1988, she worked with many radio shows, chief among them Washington Week.
