= CBS Studios =

American television production company

CBS Studios, Inc.
- Logo used since 2020
- Formerly: CBS Paramount Television (2006–2009); CBS Television Studios (2009–2020)
- Type: Subsidiary
- Industry: Television production
- Predecessors: Spelling Television; Paramount Television (Studios); CBS Productions (first and second revivals); CBS Films
- Founded: January 17, 2006; 20 years ago
- Headquarters: CBS Studio Center, Los Angeles, California, United States
- Key people: George Cheeks (Co-Chair and Chief Content Officer, Skydance TV); David Stapf (president)
- Products: Television programs
- Owner: Skydance
- Parent: CBS Corporation (2006–2019); Paramount Global (2019–2025); Paramount Skydance TV Media (2025–2026); Skydance TV Studios (2026–present)
- Divisions: CBS Studios International; See It Now Studios; Skydance Sports Entertainment
- Subsidiaries: Big Ticket Entertainment; CBS Eye Productions; Eye Productions; Raquel Productions

CBS Studios, Inc. is an American television production company which is a subsidiary of the Skydance's TV Studios unit of Skydance TV division. It was formed on January 17, 2006, by CBS Corporation as CBS Paramount Television, as a renaming of the original incarnation of the Paramount Television studio, as well as its merger with CBS Productions.

It is the television production arm of the CBS network (CBS Productions previously assumed such functions until 2004, when it was merged into Paramount Television).

== History ==
=== Predecessors ===
==== CBS's original production and distribution units ====
In 1952, the Columbia Broadcasting System (CBS) formed an in-house television production unit, CBS Productions, as well as facilities in the newly established Television City in the Fairfax District, Los Angeles in Westside. Also formed was CBS Television Film Sales (later known as CBS Films) as the distributor of off-network and first-run syndicated programming to local television stations in the United States and abroad.

In 1963, CBS Studio Center is established in the Studio City district of Los Angeles in the San Fernando Valley. In 1970, CBS Films became Viacom Enterprises and was spun off the following year. In 1978, CBS' production unit gained the secondary/alternate name CBS Entertainment Productions.

In 1994, Westinghouse Electric acquired CBS. Viacom merged with its creator CBS, in 2000.

==== Paramount Pictures' early television ventures ====
In 1939, experimental television stations were established in Los Angeles (W6XYZ) as Television Productions Inc. and Chicago (W9XBK) with Balaban and Katz. Commercial broadcasting began in 1943 over WBKB in Chicago (now WBBM-TV). Commercial broadcasting began in 1947 over KTLA in Los Angeles. In 1949, Paramount Pictures became the first major studio to establish program syndication with the Paramount Television Network (much of which originated from KTLA). Paramount branched out of broadcasting in 1964 with the sale of KTLA to Gene Autry.

==== Desilu Productions, later Paramount Network Television ====
Desilu Productions was formed in 1950 by Desi Arnaz and Lucille Ball. Desilu Studios was established in Hollywood and Culver City in 1957, after Arnaz and Ball purchased the RKO Pictures studio lot. Desilu Sales Inc. was formed in 1962 as the company's syndication arm. In 1967, Desilu Productions was acquired by Gulf and Western Industries. The company became the television division of Paramount Pictures Corporation in July, retaining the Desilu name until the end of that year. Desilu Sales, in turn, merged with Paramount's syndication division to become Paramount Television Sales.

From 1966 to 1967, Gulf+Western acquired Paramount Pictures. In 1968, Paramount Television, formerly Desilu, was established as the studio's television production unit. In 1977, Paramount Television Service was formed. In 1982, Paramount Television Group and Paramount Domestic Television and Video Programming was established. In September 1989, Gulf+Western was reincorporated as Paramount Communications Inc. On March 11, 1994, Viacom acquired Paramount Communications. In 1995, Viacom launched the United Paramount Network (UPN) with Chris-Craft Industries.

On August 10, 2004, Viacom merged the international television banners of CBS Broadcast International and Paramount International Television to form CBS Studios International. On September 7, 2004, Viacom merged CBS Productions and Paramount Network Television to form a new entity of Paramount Network Television, also known as CBS Paramount Television Entertainment Group, with CBS Productions becoming an in-name-only unit.

On December 31, 2005, as the CBS/Viacom split took effect, CBS inherited Paramount's television program library, with the second incarnation of Viacom keeping Paramount's films, the MTV Networks and the BET Networks.

=== Formation ===
CBS Paramount Television logo, used from 2006 to 2009.

CBS Television Studios logo, used from 2009 to 2020.

On January 17, 2006, CBS Corporation CEO Les Moonves announced that Paramount Television would be renamed CBS Paramount Television as of that day, and the network division becoming CBS Paramount Network Television, and the domestic distribution arm becoming CBS Paramount Domestic Television.

On September 26, 2006, CBS Corporation merged its television distribution arms—King World, CBS Paramount International Television and CBS Paramount Domestic Television—to form CBS Television Distribution. CBS Home Entertainment was then established as a subsidiary of the latter.

On May 17, 2009, the Paramount name was dropped after a 3½-year loan of its use from sister company Viacom, forming CBS Television Studios.

National Amusements retained majority control of both CBS and the second Viacom. For a short time, many of Paramount's theatrical films were distributed domestically by CBS Television Distribution (the new name for the distribution arm as of 2007). Paramount Home Entertainment continues to distribute home video sales of CBS shows through the CBS DVD brand.

From 2009 until 2011, all shows produced by the company aired on either CBS or The CW. In the past, Paramount Television produced shows for all networks, but especially had a good relationship with ABC (much as Universal Television had a good relationship with eventual sister network NBC). The Cleaner, which aired on A&E until September 2009, was the most recent show from the company to air on a network other than CBS or The CW (which is ironic when NBC/ABC's ownership of A&E is taken into account). This was until BET began airing new episodes of The Game in 2011. In 2012, USA Network began airing Common Law.

CBS Television Studios does not directly produce any shows appearing on Showtime, a premium cable television network co-owned with the studio. Instead, sister company Showtime Entertainment handles in-house productions for the network. However, CBS Television Distribution and its international arm handle syndication distribution for these shows if they ever appear in syndication.

On October 25, 2018, CBS Television Studios announced the opening of a new animation division, CBS Eye Animation Productions. A new Star Trek series entitled Star Trek: Lower Decks was announced simultaneously.

=== ViacomCBS re-merger; rebranding as CBS Studios ===
It was announced on August 13, 2019, that parent company CBS Corporation would reunite with Viacom to form a combined media company and be renamed ViacomCBS. The merger closed on December 4.

On October 8, 2020, it was announced that CBS Television Studios had been renamed CBS Studios as part of a unification of branding elements between CBS divisions, citing that use of the word "Television" in the name was antiquated due to its position of producing programming for multiple platforms.

On December 3, 2025, it was announced that BET Studios would become a label of CBS Studios as part of a series of reorganizations following the merger of Skydance Media and Paramount Global.

On April 10, 2026, Paramount Skydance announced that Nickelodeon Animation Studio would no longer operate as a separate entity and would become the kids and family animation label of CBS Studios, similar to the reorganization of BET Studios.

On November 17, 2026, as part of a restructuring of Skydance's television business, it was announced that Nickelodeon Animation Studios would come under the management of the newly formed Skydance Television Animation, within the Skydance Global Media Group.

On November 18, 2026, in conjunction with the announcement of plans to merge the Warner Bros. Television Group and Paramount Television Studios, it was revealed that BET Studios would move under Warner Bros. Television Studios, while Skydance Sports Entertainment would be placed under the umbrella of CBS Studios, alongside CBS Studios International and See It Now Studios.

== See also ==
- CBS Media Ventures, the broadcast syndication arm of CBS Studios
- Skydance Global Content Sales, the international distribution arm of Paramount Skydance formerly known as CBS Studios International
- Paramount Television Studios, the second television division of Paramount Pictures and corporate sibling of CBS Studios
- Terrytoons, an animation studio with television distribution rights to its library owned by CBS Media Ventures
