= Vladimir Duthiers =

American television journalist

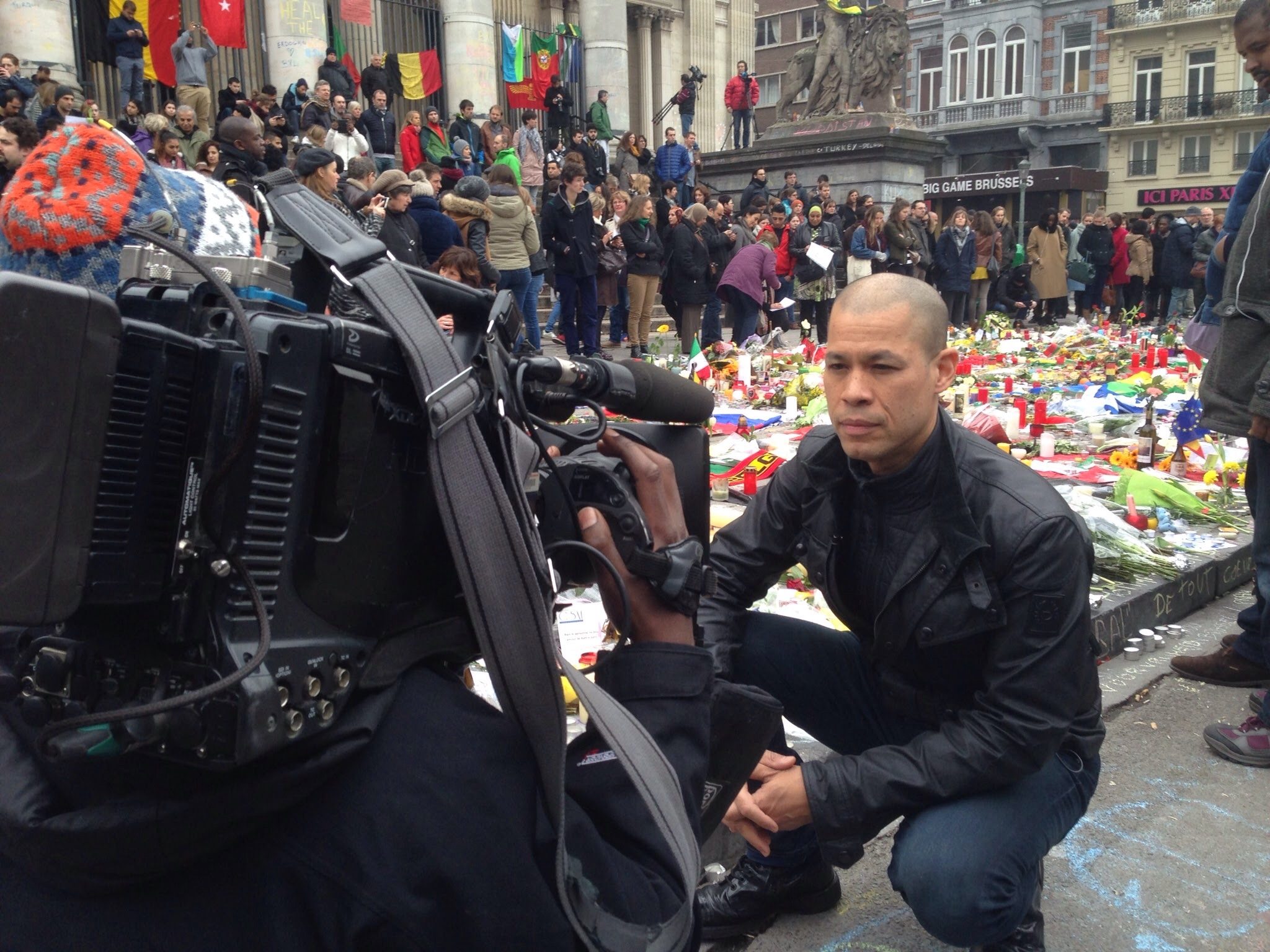
- Duthiers reporting from Brussels after the 2016 bombings
- Born: Vladimir Albert Duthiers; December 21, 1969 (age 56); New York City, New York
- Education: University of Rhode Island (BA, Political Science, 1991); Columbia University Graduate School of Journalism (MSc, 2011)
- Title: Correspondent, CBS News
- Spouse: Marian Wang
- Children: 1
- Website: CBS bio

Vladimir Albert Duthiers (/ˈduːtieɪ/; DOOT-ee-ay; born December 21, 1969) is an American television journalist who has been a correspondent for CBS News since 2014. He currently is the featured host and co-anchor of CBS Mornings and the co-anchor of CBS News 24/7 Mornings. He was previously, for five years, a member of the CNN team that won two Emmy Awards for its coverage of the 2010 Haiti earthquake, and he won a Peabody Award for his coverage from Nigeria of the kidnapping of the schoolgirls by Boko Haram.

== Early life ==
Duthiers was born and raised in New York, the son of Haitian immigrants of partial French descent. He is fluent in French and Haitian Creole. He also has partial Chinese ancestry, and speaks Mandarin Chinese fluently. He attended the University of Rhode Island, first with a journalism major before switching his focus to political science. He graduated in 1991 and began working on Wall Street in the financial services industry. He joined the asset management firm AllianceBernstein in 1993 where he was ultimately promoted to Managing Director responsible for business development in Asia, Europe, Latin America and the Middle East, before returning part-time to study broadcast journalism at Columbia University Graduate School of Journalism.

== Career ==
While at Columbia, Duthiers joined CNN in 2009, first as an intern, then as a production assistant, working on Christiane Amanpour's Amanpour and Anderson Cooper 360°. The day after the 2010 Haiti earthquake, he traveled to Haiti with the CNN team, working as an interpreter and production assistant. He was part of the team that won two Emmy Awards for its coverage of the earthquake. He was later posted to Nigeria as an international correspondent, where he won a Peabody Award for his work covering the kidnapping of the Nigerian schoolgirls by the terrorist group Boko Haram.

During his assignment in Nigeria, Duthiers reported on the terrorist activities of Boko Haram which, in addition to the kidnapping of the Chibok girls, have been responsible for killing thousands of Nigerians since 2009. While in the region, Duthiers covered the ongoing military intervention in Mali, the terrorist attack and the In Amenas hostage crisis in Algeria, the trial and sentencing of the former Liberian warlord Charles Taylor at the ICC in Sierra Leone, the crash of Dana Air Flight 992, and President Barack Obama's visit to Senegal. He also reported from Japan and South Korea on U.S. military operations in the Asia-Pacific theater, in the Middle East on the front lines of the Israeli-Palestinian crisis, from the streets of Bangkok during Thailand's political turmoil and the birth of the royal baby Prince George in July 2013.

In August 2014, he joined CBS News as a correspondent based in New York. He currently is the featured host of CBS Mornings and now co-anchor along with Gayle King and Nate Burleson as well as the co-anchor of CBS News 24/7 Mornings along with Adriana Diaz and Kelly O'Grady.

== Personal life ==
In May 2017, Duthiers delivered the commencement address for his undergraduate alma mater, the University of Rhode Island. During his speech, he told of how he was galvanized to leave his career in finance at age 37 to pursue his calling as a journalist. He was inspired, he said, by the words often attributed to Saint Augustine: “The key to immortality is first living a life worth remembering.” Duthiers also defended journalism as a profession that gives voice to the powerless and memorializes those who would otherwise be forgotten. He was awarded an honorary doctorate from URI.

On September 1, 2020, Duthiers married his long-time girlfriend Marian Wang, a senior news producer with Last Week Tonight with John Oliver. They had planned to get married in South Africa, but due to the COVID-19 pandemic, they got married on Fire Island, New York, on his mother's birthday. On September 7, 2022, Duthiers and wife Wang announced that they were expecting their first child, a baby girl in January 2023.

He has lived in Upper West Side, Manhattan and Cobble Hill, Brooklyn.

== See also ==
- New Yorkers in journalism
