= Lewis Shollenberger =

American news correspondent

Lewis Winnbert Shollenberger (October 12, 1916 – March 15, 1994) was a correspondent for United Press, CBS, and ABC in Washington, D.C., from 1940 to 1963. He covered the White House and the U.S. Senate as well as coordinated network coverage of presidential news briefings and debates. He went on to work for Radio Liberty, the Small Business Administration, and the Advertising Council.

== Early life ==
Shollenberger was born in Kansas City, Missouri to Joseph H. and Edith D. Shollenberger. He had at least one brother, named Joseph. He attended high school in Lock Haven, Pennsylvania and Washington, D.C. He graduated from Pennsylvania State University where he was a member of Sigma Pi fraternity. He also took special courses at Ravensbourne College in London and at Grunewald Gymnasium in Berlin, before graduating. His first journalism job was with the Lock Haven Express newspaper.

He married Florence E. Long in 1939. They had two children, Lewis Jr. and Carol.

== Early career ==
He moved to Arlington County, Virginia, in 1939, where he was able to get a job in Washington, D.C., with United Press. He left United Press in 1942 when he began working for CBS. For the first part of World War II, he covered wartime conferences between Franklin D. Roosevelt and Winston Churchill. In 1943 he joined the U.S. Navy, where he served in Europe and North Africa as a Lieutenant (junior grade).

== CBS ==
At the end of the war Shollenberger returned to CBS where he covered the White House and was a director and producer of special projects. He served in that capacity until 1961.

On March 1, 1952, he was in the U.S. House of Representatives at the time of a terrorist attack by the Puerto Rican Nationalist Party. He was quickly on the air to report the attack.

Shollenberger was the co-producer of the first transcontinental television program originating from San Francisco, California in 1951 and the first telecast of a Presidential Cabinet meeting in October, 1954. He had the distinction of cutting a president off air on live TV. In 1954, Dwight Eisenhower was making a paid political speech from Denver, Colorado and went over the time that had been agreed on. Shollenberger was not sure what to do so he ran a commercial before going back to programming. The next year, he was assigned to cover President Eisenhower's heart attack.

By 1960, Shollenberger was named to coordinated network coverage of the first presidential debate between Senator John F. Kennedy and Vice President Richard M. Nixon. He was the Chairman of the U.S. Senate Radio and Television Correspondents Gallery and had been assigned by CBS News to cover VIPs and delegations at both political conventions during the presidential election. He was also a member of the President's Committee on Employment of People with Disabilities.

In 1961, he produced President Kennedy's first live news conference broadcast. Later that year he left CBS to become a News Director for ABC. He stayed there until 1963.

== Radio Liberty ==
In 1963, Shollenberger left ABC to become the executive director of Radio Liberty in Munich. He was hired by Howland Sargeant to replace Richard Bertrandias. His time at Radio Liberty did not go well. He did not have the international reporting background or decisive leadership style that the position required. After an independent audit of the Munich office, Sargeant let him go in 1966.

== Later career ==
After leaving Radio Liberty, Shollenberger moderated one episode of the TV show Firing Line with William F. Buckley and Senator Barry Goldwater. He was then hired to be the director of the information office of the Small Business Administration, where he stayed until 1971. He then became vice president of the Advertising Council. He was with this group until his retirement in 1981.

== Memberships ==
Shollenberger was a president of the Radio and Television Correspondents' Association. He was a member of the Board of Governors of the National Press Club, Sigma Delta Chi, the Radio Television News Directors Association, and the National Presbyterian Church.

== Later life ==
Shollenberger was interviewed by the American Journalism Historians Association for its oral histories project. His son, Lewis Jr., died in 1986, and his wife in 1991. He moved to Hightstown, New Jersey during retirement. He died there in 1994.
