= Neeraj Khemlani =

Co-president of CBS News

Neeraj Khemlani served as president and co-head of CBS News and Stations from 2021 to 2023.

== Early life and education ==
Khemlani was born in Singapore with Sindhi ancestry and was raised in New York City. He attended Cornell University, where he was editor-in-chief of The Cornell Daily Sun and graduated in 1992. He obtained a master's degree in journalism from Columbia University.

== Career ==
Khemlani was an associate producer for ABC News anchorman Peter Jennings and produced pieces with Robert Krulwich for Nightline and Good Morning America. He joined CBS News in 1998 as an associate producer for the 60 Minutes II and left 8 years later as a producer for 60 Minutes. He was a senior executive at Yahoo! News from 2006 to 2009. He joined the Hearst Corporation as a vice president in 2009. On April 15, 2021, Khemlani was named co-head of CBS News and Stations.

== Personal life ==
He is married to Heather Cabot, a former anchor and correspondent for ABC News, and an author. He was a term member of the Council on Foreign Relations in New York City.

== Awards ==
- 1995 DuPont Award for participation in ABC News' coverage of the war in Bosnia
- 2002 Edward R. Murrow award for best investigative reporting
- 2003 Emmy nomination for Best Interview
- 2004 Emmy nomination for business reporting
- 2006 Emmy nomination for Outstanding Feature Story in a News Magazine

== See also ==
- Indians in the New York City metropolitan region
- New Yorkers in journalism
