= Bill Downs =

American broadcast journalist and war correspondent (1914–1978)

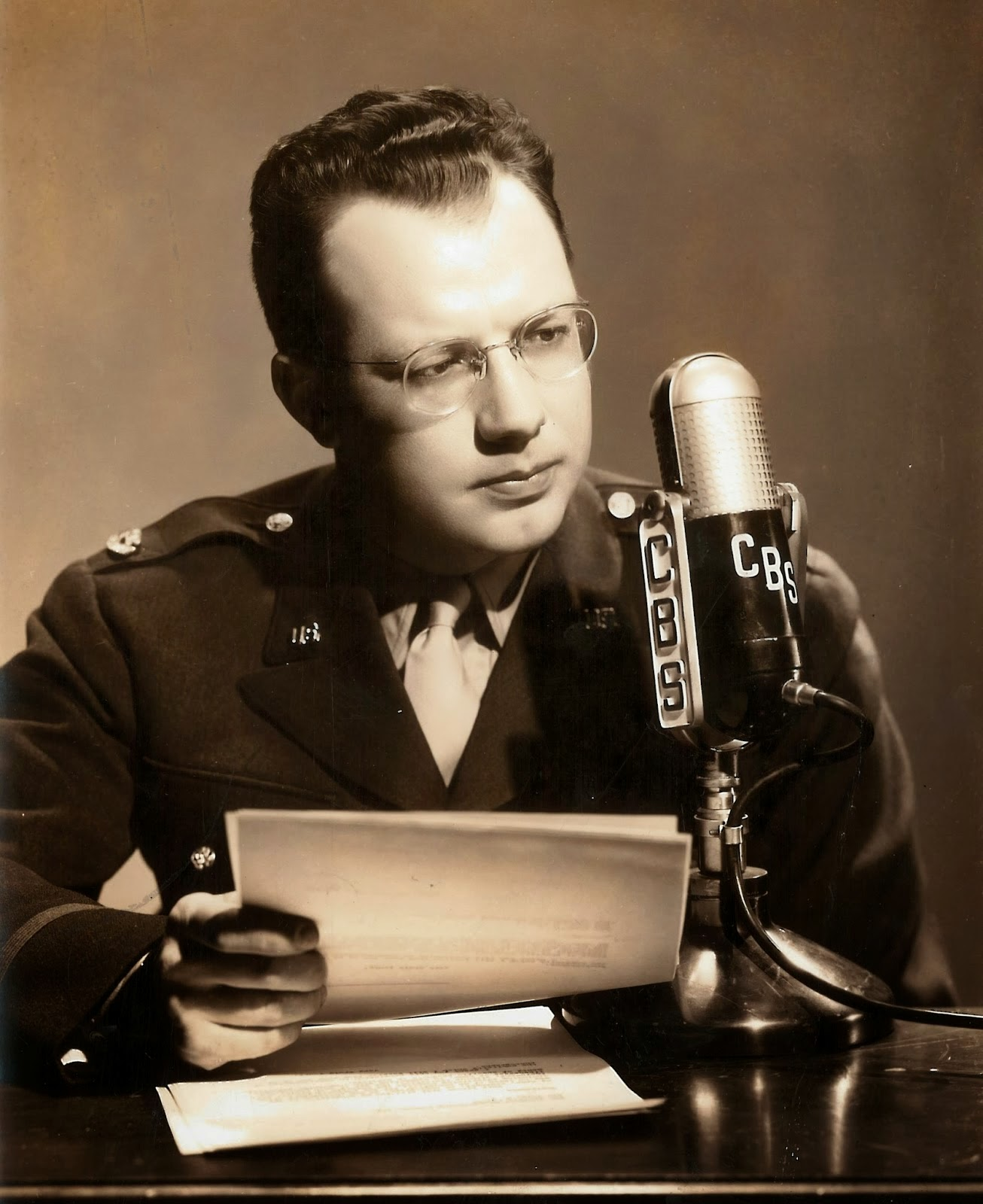
- Downs in 1942
- Born: William Randall Downs Jr. August 17, 1914; Kansas City, Kansas, U.S.
- Died: May 3, 1978 (aged 63); Bethesda, Maryland
- Education: University of Kansas
- Occupations: Journalist; War correspondent
- Years active: 1937–1978
- Spouse: Rosalind Gerson (m. 1946)

William Randall Downs, Jr. (August 17, 1914 – May 3, 1978) was an American broadcast journalist and war correspondent. He worked for CBS News from 1942 to 1962 and for ABC News beginning in 1963. He was one of the original members of the team of war correspondents known as the Murrow Boys.

Downs reported from both the Eastern and Western fronts during World War II, and was the first to deliver a live broadcast from Normandy to the United States after D-Day. After the surrender in Europe, he joined a press party that toured Asia in the months leading up to the end of the Pacific War. He entered Tokyo with Allied occupation forces and covered the Japanese surrender, and was among the first Americans to enter Hiroshima after the atomic bombing. He later covered the Bikini Atoll nuclear tests, the Berlin Blockade, and the Korean War.

== Early life ==
Downs was born in Kansas City, Kansas to William Randall Downs, Sr. and Katherine Lee (née Tyson) Downs. He served as the managing editor of the Daily Kansan at the University of Kansas and graduated in 1937 with a bachelor's degree in journalism. He began his career as a newspaper reporter for The Kansas City Star and the Kansas City Kansan. He soon joined the United Press and worked stints at the Denver and New York bureaus for the next three years. At the end of 1940 he was transferred to London, where he covered the war in Europe as a wire reporter over the next two years.

In September 1942, his former United Press colleague Charles Collingwood introduced him to Edward R. Murrow. At the time, Murrow was in search of a reporter to relieve Larry LeSueur as CBS' Moscow correspondent.

Prior to hiring Downs, Murrow had him undergo two pro forma voice tests, both of which went poorly due in part to Downs's gruff voice, an issue which would affect him throughout his career. However, Murrow was more interested in writing ability when building his team, later recalling that, when faced with complaints from CBS about how his reporters sounded on air, he responded, "I am not looking for announcers, I am looking for people who know what they're talking about." After Downs failed the voice tests, Murrow sent him to Piccadilly Circus and told him to describe whatever he saw. Murrow enjoyed his account and hired him on the spot, offering $70 weekly and an expense account during his time abroad.

Downs became a member of Murrow's team of war correspondents who came to be known as the Murrow Boys, and worked alongside Collingwood, LeSueur, William L. Shirer, Howard K. Smith, Eric Sevareid, Richard C. Hottelet, Cecil Brown, and several other CBS reporters stationed throughout Europe. Downs was soon sent to head CBS' Moscow bureau and remained there from December 25, 1942, to January 3, 1944.

== World War II ==
=== On the Eastern Front ===
Throughout 1943 Downs delivered intermittent shortwave radio reports on the CBS World News Roundup and concurrently served as the Russia correspondent for Newsweek. He stayed at the Hotel Metropol in Moscow with other Western foreign correspondents along with their secretaries and translators. They faced heavy censorship by the Ministry of Foreign Affairs, which required correspondents to submit articles and broadcast transcripts for approval. This led to frequent clashes between government officials and foreign correspondents, who were prohibited from filing any reports that might reflect negatively on Moscow. Access to military updates was often limited to official communiqués and articles in government-sanctioned newspapers. Up-to-date maps of the Soviet Union were difficult to obtain, and reporters had trouble gathering basic information from the front lines.

Downs and other foreign correspondents entered Stalingrad days after the Germans surrendered the battle. He described the scene in a graphic broadcast, saying: "There are sights and smells and sounds in and around Stalingrad that make you want to weep and make you want to shout and make you just plain sick at your stomach." Over the next several months, correspondents were gradually given more access to liberated areas, and Downs reported on developments such as the summer Russian counteroffensive on the Central Front. They were shown the devastation in Oryol and Rzhev soon after the occupying German troops retreated in March 1943.

Several weeks after the Soviet conquest of Kiev on November 6, 1943, Downs, Bill Lawrence of The New York Times, and several other American and Russian journalists were escorted by Soviet authorities to the site of the Babi Yar massacres. They came across bits of human remains and old possessions at the site. The SS had attempted to destroy all evidence in their retreat from Kiev. Downs interviewed survivors of the Syrets concentration camp who were forced to participate:

[Efim] Vilkis said that in the middle of August the SS mobilized a party of 100 Russian war prisoners, who were taken to the ravines. On Aug. 19 these men were ordered to disinter all the bodies in the ravine. The Germans meanwhile took a party to a nearby Jewish cemetery whence marble headstones were brought to Babii Yar [sic] to form the foundation of a huge funeral pyre ... approximately 1,500 bodies were burned in each operation of the furnace and each funeral pyre took two nights and one day to burn completely. The cremation went on for 40 days, and then the prisoners, who by this time included 341 men, were ordered to build another furnace. Since this was the last furnace and there were no more bodies, the prisoners decided it was for them. They made a break but only a dozen out of more than 200 survived the bullets of the German Tommy guns.

Many in the press party were skeptical of the Soviet claims at Babi Yar, with Lawrence doubting the sheer scale of it. He later admitted to having "furious arguments" with Downs over how to report the story and wrote that his reluctance to wholly accept the claims resulted from witnessing some colleagues submit unsubstantiated stories. Because of this, their two accounts were markedly different in tone and reflected their own individual perceptions. (Note: Peterson compares the two reports written by Downs and Lawrence for Newsweek and The New York Times, respectively: "The articles differ in tone. Lawrence's is guarded. 'Given the paucity of evidence after the destruction of the corpses,' he stated, 'On the basis of what we saw, it is impossible for this correspondent to judge the truth or falsity of the story told to us.' Downs, however, wrote, 'From what I saw, I am convinced that one of the most horrible tragedies in this era of Nazi era atrocities occurred there.'") (Note: According to Deborah Lipstadt, Lawrence's visit to Majdanek concentration camp in August 1944 brought him to regret his previous skepticism. In describing the overwhelming evidence of mass murder, Lawrence wrote in The New York Times: "After inspection of Maidanek, I am now prepared to believe any story of German atrocities, no matter how savage, cruel and depraved.") As late as 1944, some Western journalists remained skeptical of the actual scale of the mass murders.

Downs's descriptions of atrocities at Babi Yar and Rzhev were especially graphic. After returning home from Russia he came across more skepticism and disbelief. He "discovered that not everyone shared his strong feelings for the Russian people and the horrors they had experienced. Some looked at him curiously. Others expressed pity. Still others said he was a liar." In 1944 he received an anonymous postcard calling him a "Russian agent" and threatening his life.

Downs returned to the United States in January 1944 with the score of Dmitri Shostakovich's Eighth Symphony after CBS acquired the exclusive American broadcast rights for $10,000. Prior to leaving Moscow he provided the English narration for the documentary film Ukraine in Flames directed by Alexander Dovzhenko.

=== On the Western Front ===
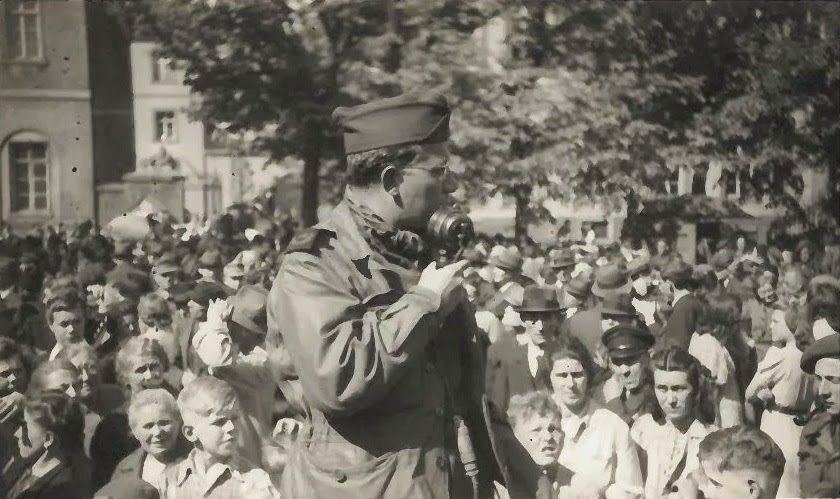
Bill Downs broadcasting from Lüneburg, Germany on V-E Day, May 8, 1945

Downs found it difficult readjusting to life after Moscow because of what he had witnessed. However, he returned to Europe in 1944, and during that time came to be considered Murrow's "Ernie Pyle." Downs earned a reputation among colleagues for ignoring the Murrow Boys' newfound celebrity in favor of accompanying soldiers on the front lines. CBS came to rely on him heavily as a result. At one point he was the only CBS foreign correspondent covering the campaigns of the First Canadian Army, the British Second, the American Ninth, and the American First.

In June 1944 he accompanied the British 50th Infantry Division in their assault on Gold Beach during the Normandy landings. Fellow Murrow Boys Larry LeSueur and Charles Collingwood also accompanied the invading forces in separate landing craft en route to Utah Beach.

In the days following the initial landings, war correspondents had trouble setting up mobile transmitters and were unable to broadcast live for over a week. In the meantime, Collingwood recorded a broadcast on June 6 that aired two days later, while LeSueur's account did not air until June 18. On June 14 Downs managed to find a working transmitter and unwittingly delivered the first live broadcast from the Normandy beachhead to the United States. It was pooled across all networks at 6:30 p.m. Eastern War Time.

He was soon embedded with the 21st Army Group, and remained so until the end of the war in Europe. In the following weeks he covered the Battle for Caen, being one of the first correspondents into the city after its liberation. In mid-August he joined Allied forces on their advance to liberate Paris, a time during which he described the Battle of the Falaise Pocket. He was with the Canadian forces who liberated Dieppe on September 1.

In September 1944, Downs covered Operation Market Garden alongside his former United Press colleague Walter Cronkite, following the 101st Airborne Division's fight to maintain control of key bridges. On September 24, Downs reported on the assault on the Waal river crossing during the Battle of Nijmegen, describing it as "a single, isolated battle that ranks in magnificence and courage with Guam, Tarawa, Omaha Beach. A story that should be told to the blowing of bugles and the beating of drums for the men whose bravery made the capture of this crossing over the Waal possible."

During the Battle of Arnhem Downs and Cronkite were stranded at the front line near Eindhoven during a sudden air raid, and were soon separated from one another in a forest during a German air raid. After much searching Cronkite concluded that Downs was likely dead, and he made his way back to Allied territory in Brussels. He discovered Downs at the Hotel Metropole and angrily asked why he had not looked for him. Downs replied that he had searched for a long time before ultimately realizing that yelling "Cronkite! Cronkite!" sounded like the German word for sickness, and that he figured he would be taken to a Berlin hospital if he kept it up, to which Cronkite laughed.

After months of following the Allied advance, he experienced a temporary bout of battle fatigue after the major defeat at Arnhem. He felt disillusioned by what he saw as indifference among the people at home who seemed to carry on as if nothing happened. To recover, he returned to London and stayed at Murrow's apartment before heading back to the front. He later joined Murrow and several other of the Boys in a visit to the death camps at Auschwitz. The experience provoked increasing anti-German sentiment among the men, including Murrow, who was strongly rebuked by Richard C. Hottelet for remarking that "there were twenty million Germans too many in the world." By 1945 the Murrow Boys had grown notably more disillusioned after witnessing years of combat, with Bill Downs saying later, "By the time the war ended, all our idealism was gone...Our crusade had been won, but our white horses had been shot out from under us."

In March 1945, Downs and correspondents from the other major networks drew lots in Paris to determine who would parachute into Berlin during the first phase of the battle and deliver the first broadcast in the event that the Western Allies reached the city first. Despite never having jumped from a plane, Downs received the assignment, and the broadcast was to be pooled among all networks. The plans were ultimately canceled upon the Soviet capture of the city.

In late March, Downs, Hottelet, and Murrow covered the crossing of the Rhine from the air. Downs was the first correspondent to broadcast from Hamburg after its surrender on May 3, 1945. One day later he delivered an eyewitness account of the German unconditional surrender to Field Marshal Bernard Montgomery at Lüneburg Heath. Downs described the Spitfires and Typhoons overhead flying north in pursuit of Germans reportedly attempting to escape to German-occupied Norway, Sweden, and Denmark. As Montgomery approached the German delegates with the surrender papers in hand, he said to reporters out of the corner of his mouth, "This is the moment." Downs received the National Headliner's Club Award for the report.

== Postwar assignments ==
=== East Asia ===
In June 1945, Downs joined a group of airborne correspondents organized by Tex McCrary to cover the Twentieth Air Force. The group included journalists Bill Lawrence, George Silk, Homer Bigart, and others. They toured Europe in the weeks after V-E Day in a custom B-17 fitted with high-powered shortwave radio equipment. They started with Paris and moved on to examine first-hand the destruction from the Allied bombing campaigns on Hamburg and Dresden. The group then made stops in Cairo, Baghdad, and Sri Lanka before reaching East Asia in August to cover the final days of the Pacific Theatre. Downs reported from Manchuria during the Soviet invasion. He arrived in Manila in August 1945 and landed with the initial occupying units of Japan, later being present for the signing of the Japanese surrender. Over the following several months the group toured Asia, making stops in China, French Indochina, Thailand, Burma, the Malay States, and Java. The group entered Hiroshima on September 4, nearly a month after the atomic bombing.

In late September 1945 the correspondents covered the postwar turmoil in Saigon, soon after the August Revolution and the arrival of the British South East Asian Command. The press party stayed at the Hotel Continental on the Rue Catinat. Downs and fellow correspondent James McGlincy were invited for lunch with Colonel A. Peter Dewey at a villa being used as the headquarters for the OSS operation in the region. While they waited, a skirmish broke out between Việt Minh fighters and the few men stationed at the headquarters. Shooting back as he ran, Major Herbert Bluechel emerged covered in Colonel Dewey's blood. In the confusion, Downs and McGlincy were handed carbines and joined the rest in the firefight. Downs shot down at least one man and is said to later have remarked how "the sight of the little brown figure falling will haunt him for years." After two and a half hours the attackers withdrew, and Downs and McGlincy volunteered to head for a nearby airport in search of reinforcements. They met three Gorkhas at the airfield who promised to go to the headquarters. Upon returning, Downs and McGlincy joined the search for Colonel Dewey's body. The revolt was ultimately put down by British and French forces who employed the aid of leftover Japanese soldiers in Saigon.

=== Operation Crossroads and the Berlin Blockade ===
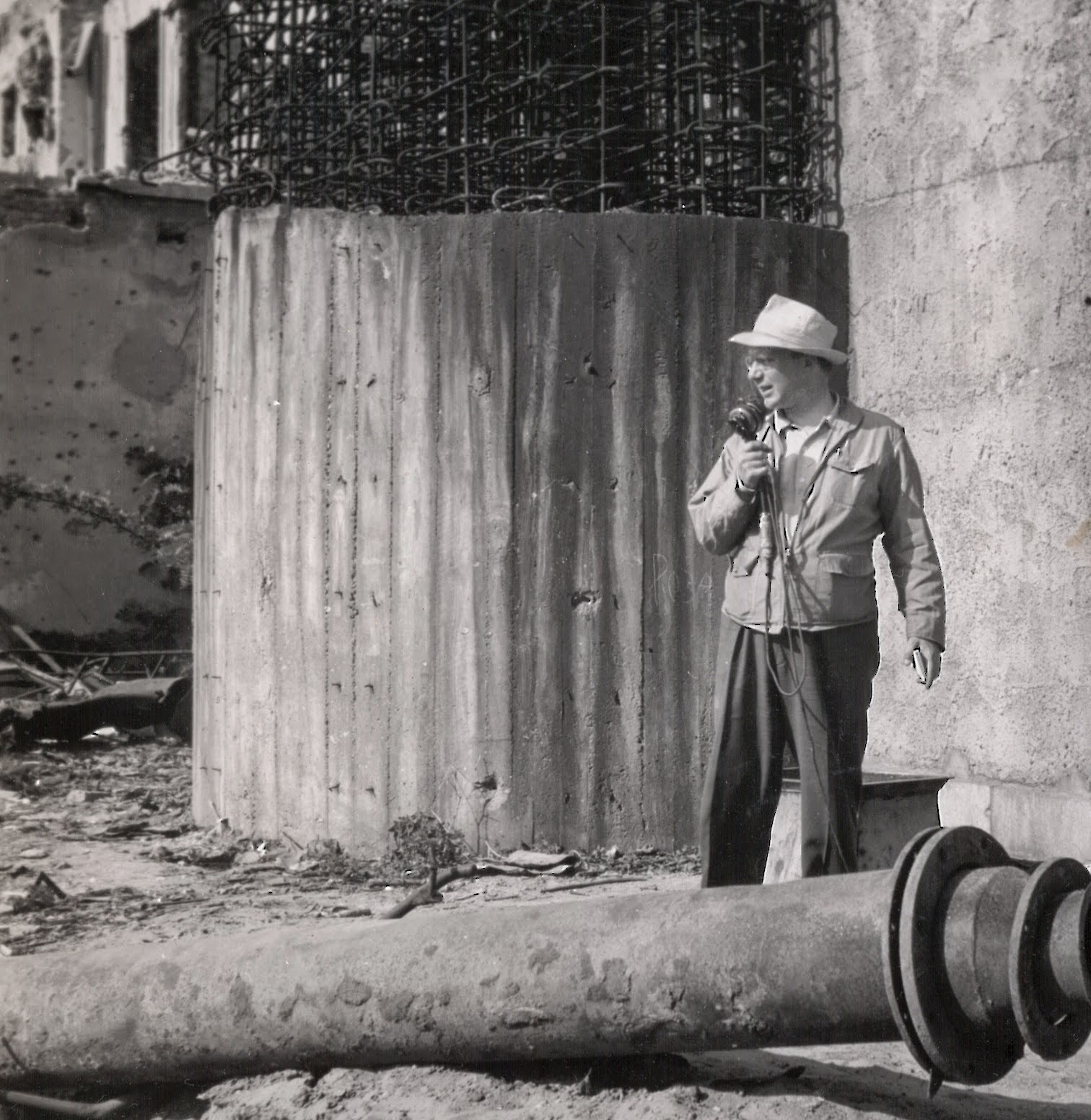
Downs in West Berlin in 1947 filming the documentary "We Went Back"

Downs received the plum assignment of flying in the observation plane during the nuclear tests at Bikini Atoll in 1946. Part of his report was carried across all networks despite protests from several wire service agencies who insisted that a neutral Naval officer should make the flight.

In 1947, he made his first return to Europe since the end of the war. He led a documentary team that retraced several major battlefronts he had covered in Western Europe. The group was accompanied by photojournalist Chim as part of a CBS series entitled "We Went Back." Upon returning to the United States later that year, he went to Detroit to cover the ongoing labor turmoil, including the attempted assassination of the United Auto Workers President Walter Reuther.

The following year CBS sent Downs to Berlin cover the blockade and subsequent airlift, as they wanted a reporter with war experience. He remained there until 1950. He delivered a Christmas broadcast from the cockpit of a Candy Bomber aircraft piloted by Gail Halvorsen as part of Operation Little Vittles. In 1950, he received the Overseas Press Club award for his work in Berlin.

=== The Korean War ===
Downs covered the Korean War in 1950. When Edward R. Murrow and Bill Lawrence arrived in Tokyo, they saw a disheveled Downs running toward them saying "Go back, go back, you silly bastards. This ain't our kind of war. This one is for the birds." Murrow would later call it the best advice he ever ignored.

Downs and Murrow worked from General Douglas MacArthur's Tokyo headquarters with the rest of the press corps. Military censorship of press broadcasts and cables caused fury among reporters stationed there; Downs's cables were among the scrutinized. Murrow considered resigning, and while he did not go public with the issue, others did. In a cable to New York, Downs described the difficulty for correspondents to evaluate the early stages of the war during the North Korean offensive, saying: "If war correspondents in Korea have exaggerated American losses, it was [because] GHQ found neither the time nor the opportunity to reply to requests to expand the picture."

While the reporting mostly involved radio, there were also televised broadcasts that tested the medium's effectiveness in war coverage. Downs contributed to Murrow's See It Now episode "Christmas in Korea." In one televised report, he stood in a decimated Korean village next to the remains of a peasant's home as the camera showed an old man holding the hand of a child as they walked down the road. Downs concluded in saying: "This is the side of war we don't see very much of, but probably it's the most important part of all."

In 1951 he narrated an anti-crime series for CBS entitled "The Nation's Nightmare." Its 1952 vinyl release featured original artwork by Andy Warhol early in his career. The record sleeve is sought after due to its rarity, though the recording itself has been called "bizarre."

=== Rome and the Middle East ===
In 1953, Downs was assigned to the Rome bureau, where he spent the next three years covering the Mediterranean and Vatican City. Over time his focus shifted to the Middle East and the Arab–Israeli conflict. In 1954 he recorded an interview with then-Egyptian Prime Minister Gamal Abdel Nasser, and went on to interview Israeli Presidents David Ben-Gurion and Moshe Sharett about the tensions with Egypt and the Arab world.

While still in Rome, Downs and other CBS foreign correspondents participated in a 1955 news broadcast hosted by Bing Crosby on Christmas Eve. The recording was later released on vinyl as A Christmas Sing with Bing Around the World. He returned to the United States the following week for the 1955 edition of Edward R. Murrow's Years of Crisis radio series. He joined other Murrow Boys to discuss the most pressing international political developments of the past year.

In 1956, he was abruptly called back from Rome to make room for Winston Burdett, a move that ultimately marked the end of Downs's career as a foreign correspondent. He reported primarily from Washington for the rest of his tenure at CBS.

== Later career at CBS ==
=== The McCarthy era and See It Now ===
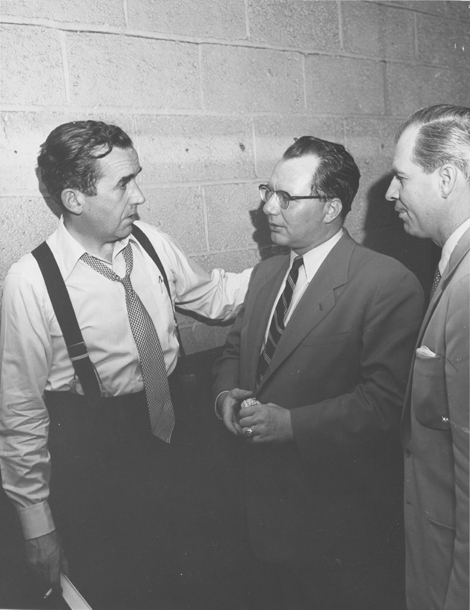
Downs (center) with Edward R. Murrow and Ron Cochran in 1956

By the early 1950s, Senator Joseph McCarthy's anticommunist campaigns created a sense of fear in Washington. Downs's wife, Roz, described the atmosphere: "Nobody at the State Department would talk to [Downs] anymore, nobody at the Defense Department would talk to him anymore, nobody in government would talk to anybody—they weren't even talking to their own friends anymore...Everybody was crazy—and frightened."

In 1950, CBS correspondents Howard K. Smith and Alexander Kendrick were named in the Red Channels, a list of 151 figures in entertainment in journalism accused of being "Red Fascists and their sympathizers" in the broadcasting field. It was also revealed that Winston Burdett had worked as a spy from 1937 to 1942 for the Communist Party, which he later renounced. Although Murrow protected his crew from being fired, CBS required its staff to sign a loyalty oath denouncing communism. Downs angrily approached him, refusing to sign. Murrow responded somberly: "You have no choice" and that "If you don't want to sign the oath, there is no way I can protect you." Downs soon went on air to attack the "cloak and dagger" atmosphere on Capitol Hill. He further alluded to McCarthy in 1953 on Murrow's radio show This I Believe, stating: "[T]he man who makes a career of 'people-hunting' or 'people-hating' is a man who desperately fears being chased or not loved."

As the controversy continued, Downs spent several years lobbying Murrow to use his television platform to challenge Senator McCarthy. Murrow shared his concerns, fearing that McCarthy's influence amounted to a "Nazi-like mass movement". However, he was conflicted about potentially abusing his own power as a newsman. After years of deliberation, Murrow and Fred Friendly aired an episode of See It Now on March 9, 1954, entitled "A Report on Senator Joseph R. McCarthy". It was a critical report featuring excerpts of McCarthy's own speeches. Downs ran nightly screenings of the broadcast at his home in Rome to packed houses, mostly consisting of Americans, including members of the State Department and military attachés.

On November 2, 1952, Downs made a somber appearance with Edward R. Murrow on See It Now after the Ivy Mike operation, the first successful testing of a thermonuclear weapon. It marked the closest the Doomsday Clock came to reaching midnight. He stated: "This seems to me to be more a day for a searching of the human soul perhaps than for any kind of scientific celebration."

=== The Murrow-Cronkite rivalry ===
During World War II Downs established close friendships with both Edward R. Murrow and Walter Cronkite. This placed him in the middle of a heated rivalry between the two men. The antagonism began in 1944 when Murrow sought out Cronkite to replace Downs as the Moscow correspondent. Cronkite initially accepted, but when the United Press offered to raise his salary, he opted to stay with them. The move soured his relationship with Murrow.

Cronkite did eventually join CBS in 1950. However, as Murrow's career seemed on the decline and Cronkite's on the rise, the two found it increasingly difficult to work together. Cronkite was not a Murrow Boy, and he felt like an outsider soon after joining CBS. Joseph Persico compared Cronkite to Downs in their demeanor as reporters; the difference being that Murrow viewed Downs as a "satellite" rather than a potential rival, as Cronkite seemed to be.

This placed Downs in the middle of many of their confrontations. He and his wife threw dinner parties at their house in Bethesda, Maryland, incidentally setting the stage for heated arguments between Cronkite and Murrow:

And so Cronkite and Murrow were both guests at the party they gave in their home in Washington early in Cronkite's television career. It was a heavy-drinking, broadcasting crowd. Downs began noisily berating Cronkite, telling him, "You're coming on too hard, trying to be a success, trying to push other people out of the way." Then, according to Downs's wife, Rosalind, Cronkite said a sympathetic word about sponsors. Sponsors, after all, paid the rent, Cronkite pointed out. It was the sort of statement designed to catch the attention of and to provoke Murrow, the news freedom purist against an apologist for commercialism in broadcasting. However, the purist was handsomely sponsored and the apologist, at this point, barely had his foot in television's door. As Roz Downs remembered that night, "They kept snapping at each other all evening. They were practically chin to chin. It was dreadful. After the party, my husband said, 'That was a small disaster. I didn't know they disliked each other that much.'"

At another dinner party, an argument between Murrow and Cronkite devolved into a "duel" in which they drunkenly took a pair of antique dueling pistols and pretended to shoot at each other. The tensions continued until Murrow's resignation from CBS in 1961.

=== Election coverage ===
Outside of his tenure in the CBS Rome bureau, Downs spent much of his later career at CBS in Washington covering presidential elections with other members of the Murrow Boys. He accompanied both candidates on the campaign trail during the 1952 presidential election, and reported from the Republican National Convention in Chicago. At one point, he was among a crowd of reporters on the floor as vice presidential candidate Richard Nixon gave a press conference, with Murrow and Cronkite in the anchor booth for CBS. Producer Don Hewitt told him to remove his headset and place it on Nixon so that Murrow and Cronkite could speak to him directly. He did so, handed Nixon his microphone, and told him "Walter Cronkite and Ed Murrow want to talk to you." Nixon went on to answer their questions, audible only to him. This practice of placing headsets on personalities to talk to Cronkite became a CBS trademark and joke.

The last election he covered for CBS was in 1960, serving as the network's correspondent for former Illinois Governor Adlai Stevenson's primary campaign. Downs later drew notoriety among the news staff for an incident covering the inauguration of John F. Kennedy. Referring to the two inaugural balls taking place on the eve of Kennedy's swearing-in, Downs said on air: "Both the President's balls are in full swing tonight."

=== Resignation ===
Following his replacement at the Rome bureau, the one assignment he said that he truly enjoyed after World War II, Downs felt his role at CBS had diminished. After holding out for years, he had finally come to accept that television would replace radio as the dominant broadcast news medium. Other staff members at CBS also took years to give up on radio, the most significant being CBS chief executive William S. Paley, one of the medium's strongest defenders. However, by 1953 Paley had fully embraced television as it became increasingly profitable.

Downs's career prospects gradually dwindled after years of relative prominence as a Murrow Boy. New management in New York believed his gruff voice was a poor fit for radio and that his looks were not suited for television. Despite this, he made sporadic televised appearances on See It Now and served as the occasional co-host of the Longines Chronoscope along with Edward P. Morgan, where they interviewed Eleanor Roosevelt in 1953. In 1957 he was made the anchor of a daily five-minute radio news summary, which he believed was a demotion, and felt overworked and underappreciated by the organization.

Downs soon lost the radio show and grew increasingly frustrated and bitter with management. His new boss Howard K. Smith said that he "was so apoplectic all the time, I found it hard to get along with him...It got to the point where I gave up on him. I didn't see him anymore." New York no longer wanted him to appear on radio and television. He was allowed to report on the State Department, but only if Smith read the reports on air for him, which Downs considered the "ultimate insult." It marked an overarching paradigm shift at the network. The Murrow Boys had been the first reporters to achieve fame in broadcast journalism. However, according to David Schoenbrun, by the 1960s the era of the Murrow Boys "freewheeling, making all the decisions, had definitely come to a close," and that challenging management "had become a cardinal sin that would not be tolerated." These issues preceded the departures of Murrow, Smith, and ultimately Downs himself. He later wrote in a letter to Eric Sevareid: "At least I can shout to the world this—I'm my own midget. The mistakes will be my mistakes—the failures will have my fiat—the successes, if any or none, will not be subject to people who worry about thick lenses, long noses, or advertising agency or affiliate bias."

He ultimately resigned as State Department correspondent for CBS in March 1962 during a shakeup that also saw the replacement of Douglas Edwards with Walter Cronkite as the anchor of CBS Evening News. Downs publicly stated that the departure was amicable, but hinted at his dissatisfaction with recent developments at the organization. One of his final major assignments for CBS was aboard the USS Randolph to cover the John Glenn orbital spaceflight mission on February 20, 1962.

== ABC News ==
Before quitting CBS, Downs considered taking time off to write a novel. He asked Murrow for his thoughts on how Downs's wife, Roz, would do if he decided to quit and become a writer. "'She'll bear up,' Murrow replied, 'until the second paycheck doesn't come in.'" Downs spent the next twenty months writing what he hoped would be the "Great American Novel." He struggled to find a publisher, and ultimately returned to reporting.

He joined ABC News on November 22, 1963, as a radio news anchor in the aftermath of the Kennedy assassination, and covered the swearing-in of President Lyndon Johnson. From then on, he worked as a "second-tier" reporter in ABC's Washington bureau.

He spent his later years working various roles, and was ABC's correspondent at the Defense Department from 1963 to 1970. He worked as a commentator covering the Nixon administration, during which time Downs drew accusations of bias from Vice President Spiro Agnew for his analysis of Nixon's "silent majority" speech, which Downs said followed the "Pentagon line" of asserting that American defeat abroad would promote recklessness among other world powers. As the Pentagon correspondent, Downs said on air that General Counsel of the Army Robert Jordan's blunt statement on the My Lai massacre may have been the first time a "high defense official" publicly expressed concern that American soldiers in Vietnam "might have committed genocide."

In 1970, he switched to covering ecological issues, and in his later years he was given smaller assignments on ABC Evening News, where he worked alongside his former CBS colleagues Howard K. Smith and Harry Reasoner as well as Barbara Walters.

== Personal life ==
Upon returning to the United States after World War II, Downs married writer Rosalind "Roz" Gerson on December 18, 1946. Together they had three children. She had been hired at CBS as a desk assistant at the same time as Shirley Lubowitz, who later married Downs's colleague Joe Wershba. Downs died of laryngeal cancer in Bethesda, Maryland on May 3, 1978. That night Walter Cronkite and Harry Reasoner gave brief obituaries on CBS Evening News and ABC Evening News, respectively.

The dinosaur species Yinlong downsi was named after his son, paleontologist William Randall "Will" Downs III in 2006.

He was not related to the journalist Hugh Downs.
