= Murrow Boys =

CBS radio broadcast journalists

The Murrow Boys
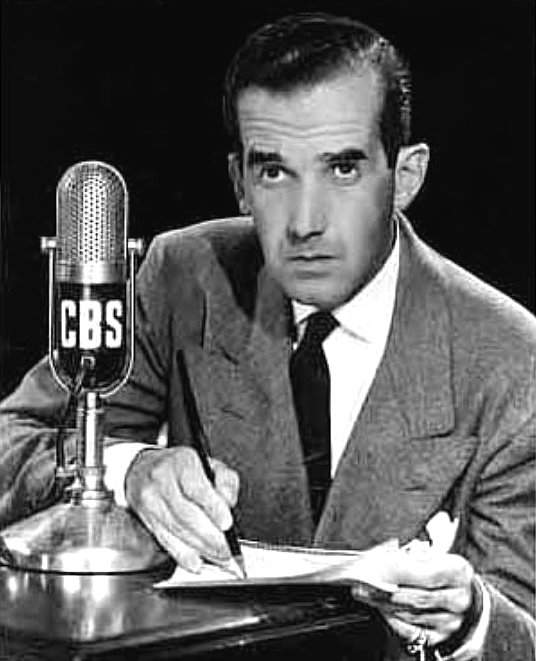
- Edward R. Murrow, the leader of the Murrow Boys, in 1947
- Other names: Murrow's Boys
- Occupation: Broadcast Journalists
- Years active: World War II era
- Employer: CBS
- Known for: War correspondence, pioneering radio and early television journalism
- Notable work: Contributions to CBS World News Roundup and other significant wartime broadcasts
- Awards: Various individual awards (Note: as a group, associated with Edward R. Murrow's prestigious career)

The Murrow Boys, or Murrow's Boys, were the CBS radio broadcast journalists most closely associated with Edward R. Murrow during his time at the network, most notably in the years before and during World War II.

Murrow recruited a number of newsmen and women to CBS during his years as a correspondent, European news chief, and executive. The "Boys" were his closest professional and personal associates. They also shared Murrow's preference for incisive, thought-provoking coverage of public affairs, abroad and at home. They achieved nationwide fame, and inadvertently became early examples of "celebrity journalism" in the days of radio and early television news.

== The original "Boys" ==
The individuals most often cited as Murrow Boys are those who worked for and with him covering the war for the CBS Radio Network. Many of his World War II recruits came from the United Press news agency, and several lacked radio experience. Their story is the subject of the 1996 book The Murrow Boys, by Stanley Cloud and Lynne Olson.

The nickname's origins are unclear. Cloud and Olson interviewed Janet Murrow and set out to determine who exactly fell under the definition of a "Murrow Boy". They primarily included those hired by or associated with Murrow during World War II, with some exceptions.

The initial team of war correspondents was assigned to fronts across Europe, and frequently appeared on the CBS World News Roundup, which Murrow and Shirer pioneered in 1938. The original Boys, and some of their notable CBS beats during the war, included:

- William L. Shirer, who covered the rise of Nazi Germany for CBS from 1937 until the end of 1940 and later wrote a successful 1941 memoir about the years, Berlin Diary. His 1,245 page history, The Rise and Fall of the Third Reich, is still in print, based largely upon captured documents, the diaries of propaganda minister Joseph Goebbels and General Franz Halder. Additional major sources include testimony and evidence from the Nuremberg trials.
- Eric Sevareid, who covered the fall of France and the London Blitz, later covering the war's progress in Great Britain, Italy, Germany, and Asia.
- Tom Grandin, a scholar who covered the fall of France before abruptly leaving CBS in 1940.
- Larry LeSueur, who covered the Blitz, the Eastern Front, and key World War II fighting in France.
- Charles Collingwood, who covered the Blitz, the North African campaign, and the liberation of France.
- Howard K. Smith, who covered Germany before Pearl Harbor and later reported from Switzerland and France.
- Winston Burdett, who covered Eastern Europe, North Africa, and Italy.
- Bill Downs, who covered the Eastern Front, France, and Germany, and later covered the Japanese surrender.
- Mary Marvin Breckinridge Patterson, the only woman among the first generation of Boys, who covered Great Britain, Scandinavia, and the Low Countries.
- Cecil Brown, who covered Rome, Eastern Europe, Singapore, and North Africa.
- Richard C. Hottelet, who covered Great Britain, France, and Germany.

Several Murrow Boys were assigned to accompany Allied forces on D-Day. Hottelet rode along in a bomber over Utah Beach at H-Hour, the initial phase of the invasion. Collingwood and Gene Ryder covered Utah Beach, as did Larry LeSueur from a separate landing craft, while Downs covered Gold Beach. All three had difficulty finding working mobile transmitters, and no correspondents of any network were able to report live from the Normandy front until over a week after the initial landings.

Of the original Boys, Hottelet had the longest career at CBS, joining the network in 1944 remaining there until 1985. He was the last surviving member of the original group.

The group maintained close ties with Murrow but not necessarily each other. They had significant autonomy in filing reports, and while they had been influential in developing the field of radio news broadcasting, they were reluctant to make the transition to television. The Murrow Boys earned far more working in radio than they could in television, and they resented the process of lights, cameras, makeup, and other aspects of TV broadcasting. By the 1950s their dominating presence in the field had begun to decline.

Despite this, many in the core group stayed with CBS throughout the 1950s. During the McCarthy era, Howard K. Smith, William L. Shirer, and Alexander Kendrick were among those named in the Red Channels.

=== Other Murrow associates in Europe ===
Several other CBS journalists worked for and with Murrow during the crisis years in Europe, though they are not mentioned as being in the circle of Boys. They include Bill Shadel, Charles Shaw, Douglas Edwards, John Charles Daly, Paul Manning, George Moorad, and Betty Wason. Also included is Edwin Hartrich, who worked under Bill Shirer in Berlin and broadcast daily on CBS through most of 1940; and Ned Calmer, who joined the CBS team in 1940 after working for the European editions of the Chicago Tribune and the New York Herald.

== Second generation "Boys" ==
After World War II, Murrow returned to New York and briefly served as CBS's vice president for public affairs. He maintained close friendships with the correspondents he hired during the war, and spent much of his free time with them. Younger colleagues who Murrow had not played a role in hiring began to feel like outsiders and viewed his relationship with the Murrow Boys preferential treatment. They formed the "Murrow Isn't God Club", which soon disbanded after Murrow asked if he could join.

Murrow recruited several promising journalists in the mold of the original Boys, some of whom became close enough to Murrow that they are seen as a second generation. They include:

- David Schoenbrun, who covered France.
- Daniel Schorr, who covered the Soviet Union and Germany.
- Alexander Kendrick, who covered Vienna, Great Britain, and Russia duiring the war. Later, he became Murrow's first biographer.
- Robert Pierpoint, who covered the Korean War before becoming a CBS News White House correspondent.
- George Polk, who covered the Middle East and Turkey and was killed while covering Greece in 1948.
- Marvin Kalb, who covered Moscow and Washington for CBS.

Schorr stayed with CBS News until his 1976 dismissal following his refusal to identify a source. He later joined CNN, and was a senior news analyst for National Public Radio, often delivering commentaries in the Murrow mold, until his death on July 23, 2010.

Kalb, the last journalist recruited by Murrow to CBS, was joined by his brother Bernard at the network in the 1960s and 70s. The Kalbs later moved on to NBC. Marvin Kalb is now a Fox News contributor and is now a Washington-based senior fellow for Harvard University.

Many journalists, including some at CBS, include these "postwar" associates in the group of Boys, though authors Cloud and Olson limited their own list to the World War II crew.

=== Other colleagues ===
Though they are not considered Murrow's Boys, several other notable journalists worked closely with Murrow during his years at CBS, including:

- Robert Trout, legendary correspondent who preceded Murrow at CBS and coached Murrow in radio broadcasting.
- Fred W. Friendly, co-producer with Murrow of radio's Hear It Now and TV's See It Now.
- Palmer Williams, Murrow and Friendly's operations director on See It Now.
- Joseph Wershba, a reporter who worked with Murrow on Hear It Now and See It Now.
- John F. Peterson, USN Combat Camera Group worked with Murrow at CBS and See It Now during the Korean War
- Don Hewitt, the director of See It Now in its early years, who borrowed from the format to create 60 Minutes.
- Edward P. Morgan, who produced Murrow's CBS Radio show This I Believe in the 1950s. The program presented people's personal philosophies on morality and faith.
- Raymond Gram Swing, a radio commentator who worked closely with Murrow to foster understanding between the British and Americans during the war years. He later took over production of This I Believe from Morgan.
- Marguerite Higgins, who worked alongside Murrow, Pierpoint, and Downs during the Korean War.
- Walter Cronkite, whom Murrow approached in 1943 to join the team and relieve Bill Downs as the CBS Moscow correspondent. Cronkite ultimately turned the offer down when his employer, United Press, countered with a large pay increase. He went on to join CBS in 1950.

Friendly went on to become CBS News president and later taught at Columbia University, where he introduced the Murrow standards to generations of young journalists. Hewitt worked closely with Williams and Wershba during the early years of 60 Minutes.
