= Ned Calmer =

American journalist and writer (1907–1986)

- Born: Edgar Calmer; July 16, 1907; Chicago, Illinois
- Died: March 9, 1986 (aged 78); New York City
- Occupation: Journalist

Ned Calmer (July 16, 1907 – March 9, 1986) was a Chicago-born American journalist and writer. He was a long-time CBS News analyst and close associate of Edward R. Murrow.

== Early years ==
Calmer was born Edgar Calmer in Chicago, Illinois. He attended the University of Virginia.

== Work At CBS ==
=== Radio ===
Calmer was hired by Edward R. Murrow to work for CBS in 1940. He worked abroad and in the United States as a member of the war time news team known as Murrow's Boys. Other notable members include Charles Collingwood, William L. Shirer, Richard C. Hottelet and Larry LeSueur.

During his tenure at CBS Calmer also hosted the CBS World News Roundup. The radio show began on March 13, 1938, in response to growing tensions in Europe. It was originally hosted by veteran newsman Robert Trout and included short wave reports from London, Paris, Vienna, Rome and Berlin.

In addition to Trout and Calmer several other notable Murrow's Boys and journalists hosted and rose to prominence through CBS World News Roundup. They include Eric Sevareid, Charles Collingwood, Howard K. Smith, Bill Lynch and Winston Burdett.

=== Television ===
Calmer had a limited-run prime-time interview program, In the First Person in 1950, and he was the newsman on Good Morning in 1956–1957. He was also seen at times on CBS Views the Press, See It Now, and You Are There.

== Other work ==
From 1927 Calmer worked for seven years at various European publications. Those included the Paris Tribune and the Paris Herald which were the European editions of the Chicago Tribune and the New York Herald.

== Books ==
Calmer was an accomplished writer and novelist in addition to his journalistic career. His first novel, Beyond the Street, was published in 1934 by Little, Brown and Company. During his time in Paris, Calmer became a friend of Ernest Hemingway, who offered him advice on writing and also helped finance a trip back to the United States for Calmer and his wife and daughter. Calmer authored more than a dozen other books during his lifetime, including The Strange Land (1950), about combat in Europe, The Anchorman (1970), on the influence of television, and The Winds of Montauk (1980), a family story.
