= Irving G. Williams =

American historian (1915-2008)

Irving Gregory Williams (March 17, 1915 – July 17, 2008) was an American historian, author, and educator who specialized in the history of the vice presidency of the United States.

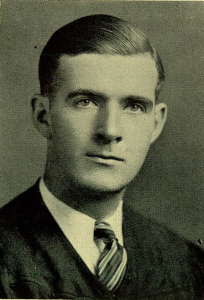
Irving G. Williams, 1936

Williams was born in Brooklyn, New York to Charles Thomas Williams and Margaret Gardner Williams. He attended St. John's University and received both a B.A. (1936) and M.A. (1938). His master's thesis topic was "A study in diplomatic origins - the Anglo-French entente of 1904," and the thesis was signed by Dr. Arpad F. Kovacs (History), the Rev. Frederick J. Russell (Philosophy), and Professor Thaddeus F. O'Reilly (Social Science). He received his Ph.D. from New York University in 1953 with a two-volume dissertation on "The Vice-Presidency of the United States in the Twentieth Century: History, Practices, and Problems." In it, he thanked Ralph B. Flanders of the History Department and Edward C. Smith of the Government Department.

== Teaching career ==
Williams began his career as a history teacher at St. John's Preparatory School in Brooklyn (1936-1938), and after completing his master's degree he was hired as an instructor (1938-1941) at St. John's University in their Teachers College. His teaching career was interrupted by service in the U.S. Navy from June 4, 1941 to November 19, 1945. (After his discharge, he continued to serve in the Naval Reserve until 1950.) Williams resumed his teaching career at St. John's as instructor (1946-1947), assistant professor (1947-1951), associate professor (1951-1954), and professor (1954-1977), and was twice chair of the history department: 1948 to 1958, and 1963 to 1966.

Although he had no formal training as a special collections librarian, Williams became director of the newly established Office of Historical Collections within the St. John's University Library in 1969, and by the time that the office closed in 1971 and the materials were transferred to the newly established University Archives, “he compiled an impressive array of individual documents and manuscript collections through purchase and donation including those written by U.S. presidents, vice presidents, congressmen, ambassadors, educators, authors, religious leaders and other historical figures. Records of organizations like the American Friends of Irish Neutrality and the American League for an Undivided Ireland were also acquired at that time.

== Scholarship ==
Williams was the author of several books, including The American Vice-Presidency: New Look (1954), The Rise of the Vice Presidency (1956), Government: Its Structure and Interpretation (1966, 1970), and (with Don Sharkey) You and your government (1967). He also contributed articles to scholarly journals, such as World Affairs, Thought Patterns, and Current History, as well as chapters to Concept of Freedom (1955) and Power and the Presidency (1976). The latter grew out of a 54-program CBS television series on "The American Presidency: The Men and the Office," in which he participated. He also contributed thirteen articles to the World Book Encyclopedia.

== Major influence ==
Williams credited Professor Thaddeus F. O'Reilly as the "first man to make history live for me... He was a great and important teacher."

== Awards ==
The book Concept of Freedom which Williams and several other St. John's faculty members collaborated on was awarded a Washington Medal and a $1,000 check from the Freedoms Foundation in Valley Forge in 1955. The Rise of the Vice Presidency was named as one of "250 Outstanding Books of the Year" by the New York Times Book Review in 1956. In 1962, Williams received the "Outstanding Teacher Award" from St. John's University, which also came with $1,000 in cash. His consulting work for Edward R. Murrow's "See It Now" television program documentary on the vice presidency resulted in him receiving a Sylvania Television Award in 1955. He received the President's Medal from St. John’s in 1972.

== Personal and death ==
He married Helene Muriel Kalbacker on October 9, 1942. They had two children. Williams died at age 93 in Lynbrook, New York.

== Publications ==
- Irving G. Williams. The American Vice-Presidency: New Look. New York: Doubleday & Company, Inc., 1954.
- Irving G. Williams. "Freedom and Government." In Carl W. Grindel (ed.), Concept of Freedom. Chicago: Henry Regnery Company, 1955, 145-171.
- Irving G. Williams. The Rise of the Vice Presidency. Introduction by Edward R. Murrow. Washington, D.C.: Public Affairs Press, 1956.
- Irving G. Williams. "The Vice Presidency: Path to the White House?" Redman 7, no. 1 (Nov. 1956): 3-7, 20-23.
- Irving G. Williams. "The American Vice-Presidency and Foreign Affairs." World Affairs 120, no. 2 (Summer 1957): 38-41, JSTOR,
- Irving G. Williams. "Senators, Rules, and Vice-Presidents." Thought Patterns 5 (1957): 21-35.
- Irving G. Williams. "Teacher of Teachers: The School of Education is Fifty Years Young and Faces the Needs of the Nation on the Threshold of Her Greatest Era of Expansion." Redman (Spring 1959): 57-59.
- Irving Williams. "How Not To Be a Success in Teaching - Without Really Trying." St. John's University Alumni News 3, no. 6 (April 1962): 2.
- Irving G. Williams. "Memoir of a Visit with Kerensky." St. John's University Humanities Newsletter 1, no. 3 (Spring 1965): 6.
- Don Sharkey and Irving G. Williams. You and Your Government. New York: William H. Sadlier, 1967.
- Irving G. Williams. "Filling the Slate." Humanitas of St. John's University 3, no. 4 (Spring 1968): 8-10.
- Irving G. Williams. Government: Its Structure and Interpretation. New York: W. H. Sadlier, 1966; 1970.
- Irving G. Williams. "The American Vice Presidency." Current History 66, no. 394 (June 1974): 254-258, 273-274, JSTOR,
- Irving G. Williams. "Waiting in the Wings: The Vice-Presidency." In Philip C. Dolce and George H. Skau (eds.), Power and the presidency. New York: Charles Scribner's Sons, 1976, 175-185.
