= Tom Grandin =

American journalist

- Born: Tom Grandin; July 19, 1907; Cleveland, Ohio, U.S.
- Died: October 19, 1977 (aged 70)
- Occupations: Journalist; War correspondent

Thomas Grandin (July 19, 1907 – October 19, 1977) was an American broadcast journalist during World War II. He was an original member of a team of reporters and war correspondents known as the Murrow Boys.

== Early career ==
Grandin was born in Cleveland, Ohio. He graduated from Yale University in 1930 and studied international law at the University of Berlin and the École des sciences politiques in Paris. In Paris, Grandin worked at the International Chamber of Commerce.

== Journalist ==
In 1939, Grandin became the second reporter hired by Edward R. Murrow and one of the original Murrow Boys. Murrow hired Grandin, who had no journalism experience, mostly for Grandin's language skills and his expertise in international issues. Grandin began covering Paris for Murrow and CBS but abruptly left Europe in 1940.

Paris fell to the German onslaught in 1940, and Grandin decided that he had to return to the United States. His reasons were personal. Initially, Grandin intended to send only his wife back to the US, but because she was Romanian and lacked an American passport, she would not have been allowed into the country without him. Murrow understood Grandin's reasoning, but others at CBS, including William Shirer, saw Grandin as a deserter.

In 1944, Grandin took a job with ABC News in covering the war. In June of that year he accompanied the first American troops to land at Omaha Beach in Normandy on D-Day. Grandin retired from broadcasting after the war and went to work as a sales executive.
