= Edward R. Murrow Park =

Park in Washington, D.C., U.S.

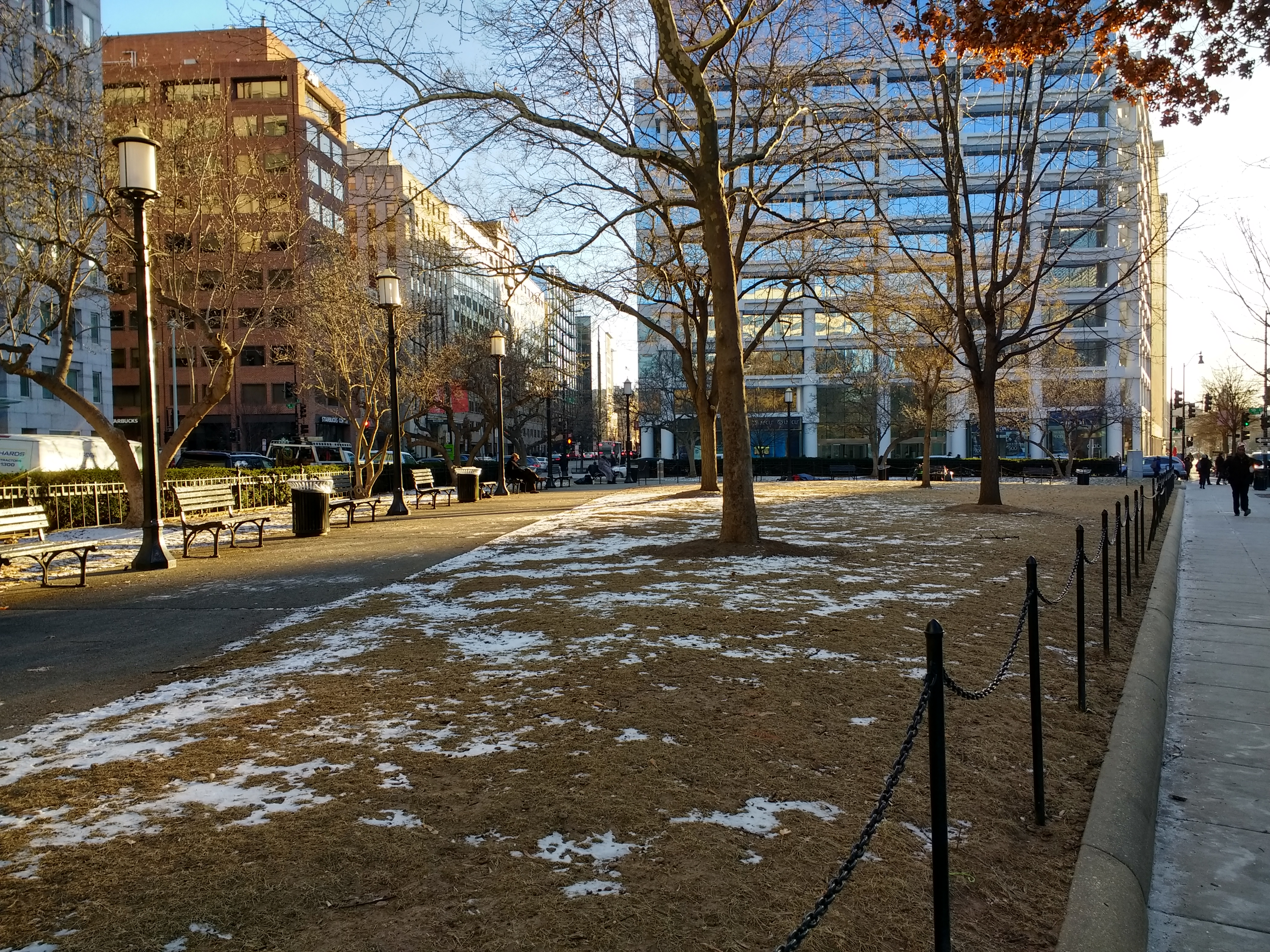
- The park in January 2018

- Location within Central Washington, D.C. Location within the United States
- Location: Washington, D.C.
- Coordinates: 38°54′00″N 77°02′32″W

Edward R. Murrow Park is a park located in Washington, D.C. at the corner of H Street NW and 18th Street NW. This National Park site is associated with World War II and named after the journalist Edward R. Murrow.

== Events ==
In April 2009, a group of activists gathered at the park to protest the International Monetary Fund and World Bank. In 2011, the park served as a protest site during the Occupy D.C. movement
