= Larry LeSueur =

American journalist

- Born: Laurence Edward LeSueur; June 10, 1909; New York City, U.S.
- Died: February 5, 2003 (aged 93); Washington, D.C., U.S.
- Occupations: Journalist; War correspondent

Laurence Edward LeSueur (June 10, 1909 – February 5, 2003) was an American journalist and a war correspondent during World War II. He worked closely with Edward R. Murrow and was one of the original Murrow Boys.

== Early life ==
LeSueur was born on June 10, 1909, in New York City. Both his father and his paternal grandfather were journalists; his grandfather ran a newspaper while an Indian Agent in Tama, Iowa, and his father was a foreign correspondent for the New York Tribune.

== Career ==
LeSueur began studies at New York University (NYU) in 1927. LeSueur studied English at NYU and, in 1932, received his bachelor's degree. LeSueur's first jobs out of college were at Macy's and Women's Wear Daily. Shortly afterward, he began working as a reporter for United Press, a wire syndicate.

In 1939, LeSueur traveled to England, where he approached Edward R. Murrow about a job. He was subsequently hired by CBS and Murrow. LeSueur covered the war across Europe, filing radio reports from Russia and London. He covered the war on London After Dark, along with Murrow and Eric Sevareid, reporting the ongoing London Blitz. He reported extensively from the Soviet Union after he was assigned to Moscow in 1941.

LeSueur covered D-Day, the Liberation of Paris, as well as the Liberation of Dachau and Mauthausen concentration camp. He delivered the first broadcast to American listeners from a liberated Paris via underground radio broadcast that had not been cleared by military censors. He was cited for that by the War Department for "outstanding and conspicuous service" and awarded the French Legion of Honor and the French Liberation Medal.

On D-Day, LeSueur landed with American troops on Utah Beach. He went ashore with the American 4th Infantry Division (United States), but his cables from June 6 were lost by Navy couriers en route to London. It took a week until his broadcasts from the first day of Normandy could be heard by US listeners.

Twelve days later, on the June 18 edition of CBS World News Today, LeSueur gave his account of landing at Normandy and witnessing the Allied bombings across the beaches, the surrenders of Nazi soldiers, and his eventual arrival to the skirmish in Sainte-Marie-du-Mont just hours after the landings.

He was awarded the Medal of Freedom for his reporting on World War II. LeSueur also penned a book in 1943, Twelve Months That Changed the World, about important Eastern Front battles he covered in 1941 and 1942 for CBS.

After the war ended, LeSueur became CBS's White House correspondent and covered the Paris Peace Conference. Soon afterward, he began covering the United Nations. In 1948, LeSueur and CBS Radio were awarded a Peabody Award for radio shows UN in Action, Between Dark and Daylight and others. A year later, as moderator of the CBS Television show United Nations in Action, he won another Peabody Award. He also co-hosted the CBS television show Longines Chronoscope (1951–1955). LeSueur's last appearance on CBS Radio came in 1999, when he appeared with former Murrow's Boys colleagues Richard C. Hottelet, Howard K. Smith, Marvin Breckinridge Patterson, and other former radio colleagues Robert Trout and Ed Bliss for a 20th-century roundup show.

LeSueur left CBS and joined Voice of America (VOA) in 1963. LeSueur was considered the "forgotten" Murrow's Boy. At the time, VOA was an agency of the United States Information Agency, then headed by Murrow. As a reporter at VOA, he was the White House correspondent until he retired in 1984.

== Personal life ==
LeSueur was married three times. The first two marriages, to Joan Phelps and Priscilla Bruce, ended in divorce, but his final marriage, to Dorothy Hawkins, lasted for 46 years until his death. He also had two daughters, one with Hawkins and another with Bruce.

== Death ==
He died at 93 on February 5, 2003, at his home in Washington, D.C., after a long battle with Parkinson's disease. His wife, Dorothy, told CBS News that on his death, he was listening to former Secretary of State Colin Powell address the UN on the evidence surrounding Saddam Hussein's alleged weapons of mass destruction stockpiles in the run-up to the Iraq War.

== Awards and honors ==
- French Legion of Honor
- French Liberation Medal
- Medal of Freedom
- Peabody Award: 1948 – Institutional Award for Outstanding Programming in the Promotion of International Understanding.
- Peabody Award: 1949 – Television News Award as moderator of United Nations in Action.

== Selected publications ==
- Twelve Months That Changed the World (1943)
