= Robert Pierpoint (journalist) =

American journalist

Robert Pierpoint (May 16, 1925 – October 22, 2011) was an American broadcast journalist who worked for CBS News.

Born in Redondo Beach, California, Pierpoint served in the United States Navy during World War II. In 1948, he graduated from the University of Redlands. Before becoming one of CBS's White House correspondents, Pierpoint covered the Korean War and appeared on the first edition of See It Now in 1951. Recreating the role, his voice appears in "Goodbye, Farewell and Amen", the final episode of M*A*S*H.

On November 22, 1963, he was riding in a press bus in the motorcade for President John F. Kennedy when the president was assassinated. He also covered the State Department for CBS, and appeared frequently on Charles Kuralt's Sunday Morning broadcasts until his retirement.

As a close associate of Edward R. Murrow on radio and television, he was seen as having been a member of the second generation of Murrow's Boys.

Pierpoint also served as a White House correspondent during six presidential administrations, from Eisenhower to Carter. His memoirs from this period are detailed in his book, At the White House (1981). His biography, Robert Pierpoint: A Life at CBS News, authored by Tony Silvia, was published in 2014. It is based upon Pierpoint's reporter notebooks in the archives of the Wisconsin Historical Society, as well as his personal papers, letters, and recordings, housed at his alma mater, the University of Redlands (CA).

== Family ==
Pierpoint and his wife, Patricia Adams Pierpoint, had four children, including actor Eric Pierpoint. He is buried in the Redlands, California, Hillside Memorial Park Cemetery.

== Sources ==
- Office of Medical History: Army Air Ambulances
