= Edward R. Murrow =

American broadcast journalist (1908–1965)

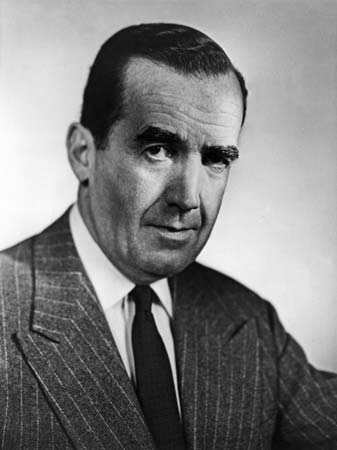
- Murrow in 1962
- Born: Egbert Roscoe Murrow; April 25, 1908; Guilford County, North Carolina, U.S.
- Died: April 27, 1965 (aged 57); Pawling, New York, U.S.
- Resting place: Glen Arden Farm, New York; 41°34′15.7″N 73°36′33.6″W
- Education: Washington State University
- Occupations: Journalist; radio broadcaster
- Years active: 1935–1964
- Known for: On-the-spot radio reports from London and other locations in Europe during World War II.; Series of television news reports that led to the censure of U.S. Senator Joseph McCarthy.
- Spouse: Janet Huntington Brewster (m. 1934)
- Children: 1

Edward Roscoe Murrow (born Egbert Roscoe Murrow; April 25, 1908 – April 27, 1965) was an American broadcast journalist and war correspondent.

He first gained prominence during World War II with a series of live radio broadcasts from Europe for the news division of CBS. During the war he recruited and worked closely with a team of war correspondents who came to be known as the Murrow Boys.

A pioneer of radio and television news broadcasting, Murrow produced a series of reports on his television program See It Now which helped lead to the censure of Senator Joseph McCarthy. Fellow journalists Eric Sevareid, Ed Bliss, Bill Downs, and Alexander Kendrick considered, as does Dan Rather, Murrow one of journalism's greatest figures. Murrow's life has been dramatized in several films, including Good Night, and Good Luck, which takes its name from the signature sign-off phrase Murrow used to end many of his wartime broadcasts.

== Early life ==
Murrow was born Egbert Roscoe Murrow at Polecat Creek, near Greensboro, in Guilford County, North Carolina, to Roscoe Conklin Murrow and Ethel F. (née Lamb) Murrow. His parents were Quakers. He was the youngest of four brothers and was a "mixture of Scottish, Irish, English and German" descent. The firstborn, Roscoe Jr., lived only a few hours. His other two brothers, Lacey Van Buren and Dewey Joshua, were four and two years old respectively when Murrow was born. His home was a log cabin without electricity or plumbing, on a farm bringing in only a few hundred dollars a year from corn and hay.

When Murrow was six years old, his family moved across the country to Skagit County in western Washington, to homestead near Blanchard, 30 miles (50 km) south of the Canada–United States border. He attended high school in nearby Edison, and was president of the student body in his senior year and excelled on the debate team. He sang bass in the glee club, and was also a member of the basketball team which won the Skagit County championship.

After graduation from high school in 1926, Murrow enrolled at Washington State College (now Washington State University) across the state in Pullman, and eventually majored in speech. A member of Kappa Sigma fraternity, he was also active in college politics. By his teen years, Murrow went by the nickname "Ed" and during his second year of college, he changed his name from Egbert to Edward. In 1929, while attending the annual convention of the National Student Federation of America, Murrow gave a speech urging college students to become more interested in national and world affairs; this led to his election as president of the federation. After earning his bachelor's degree in 1930, he moved back east to New York.

Murrow was assistant director of the Institute of International Education from 1932 to 1935 and served as assistant secretary of the Emergency Committee in Aid of Displaced Foreign Scholars, which helped prominent German scholars who had been dismissed from academic positions. He married Janet Huntington Brewster at her Middletown, Connecticut house on October 27, 1934. Their son, Charles Casey Murrow, was born in the west of London on November 6, 1945.

== Career at CBS ==
Murrow joined CBS as director of talks and education in 1935 and remained with the network for his entire career. CBS did not have news staff when Murrow joined, save for announcer Bob Trout. Murrow's job was to line up newsmakers who would appear on the network to talk about the issues of the day. But the onetime Washington State speech major was intrigued by Trout's on-air delivery, and Trout gave Murrow tips on how to communicate effectively on radio.

Murrow went to London in 1937 to serve as the director of CBS's European operations. The position did not involve on-air reporting; his job was persuading European figures to broadcast over the CBS network, which was in direct competition with NBC's two radio networks. During this time, he made frequent trips around Europe. In 1937, Murrow hired journalist William L. Shirer, and assigned him to a similar post on the continent. This marked the beginning of the "Murrow Boys" team of war reporters.

=== Radio ===
Murrow gained his first glimpse of fame during the March 1938 Anschluss, in which Adolf Hitler engineered the annexation of Austria by Nazi Germany. While Murrow was in Poland arranging a broadcast of children's choruses, he got word from Shirer of the annexation—and the fact that Shirer could not get the story out through Austrian state radio facilities. Murrow immediately sent Shirer to London. Shirer wrote in his diary:

I was at the Aspern airport at 7a.m. The Gestapo had taken over. At first they said no planes would be allowed to take off. Then they cleared the London plane. But I could not get on. I offered fantastic sums to several passengers for their places. Most of them were Jews and I could not blame them for turning me down. Next was the plane to Berlin. I got on that.

Shirer flew from Vienna to Berlin, then Amsterdam, and finally to London, where he delivered an uncensored eyewitness account of the Anschluss. Murrow then chartered the only transportation available, a 23-passenger plane, to fly from Warsaw to Vienna so he could take over from Shirer.

At the request of CBS management in New York, Murrow and Shirer put together a European News Roundup of reaction to the Anschluss, which brought correspondents from various European cities together for a single broadcast. On March 13, 1938, the special was broadcast, hosted by Bob Trout in New York, including Shirer in London (with Labour MP Ellen Wilkinson), reporter Edgar Ansel Mowrer of the Chicago Daily News in Paris, reporter Pierre J. Huss of the International News Service in Berlin, and Senator Lewis B. Schwellenbach in Washington, D.C. Reporter Frank Gervasi, in Rome, was unable to find a transmitter to broadcast reaction from the Italian capital but phoned his script to Shirer in London, who read it on the air. Murrow reported live from Vienna, in the first on-the-scene news report of his career: "This is Edward Murrow speaking from Vienna.... It's now nearly 2:30 in the morning, and Herr Hitler has not yet arrived."

The broadcast was considered revolutionary at the time. Featuring multipoint, live reports transmitted by shortwave in the days before modern technology (and without each of the parties necessarily being able to hear one another), it came off almost flawlessly. The special became the basis for World News Roundup.

On March 19, Shirer returned from London, and Murrow met his plane at Vienna's Aspern airport. Returning to Shirer's apartment, they encountered SS troops looting the Vienna mansion of the Rothschild family. "We found a quiet bar off the Kärntnerstrasse for a talk," Shirer wrote.

Ed was a little nervous.
"Let's go to another place," he suggested.
"Why?"
"I was here last night about this time," he said. "A Jewish-looking fellow was standing at that bar. After a while he took an old-fashioned razor from his pocket and slashed his throat."

In September 1938, Murrow and Shirer were regular participants in CBS's coverage of the crisis over the Sudetenland in Czechoslovakia, which Hitler coveted for Germany and eventually won in the Munich Agreement. Their incisive reporting heightened the American appetite for radio news, with listeners regularly waiting for Murrow's shortwave broadcasts, introduced by analyst H. V. Kaltenborn in New York saying, "Calling Ed Murrow ... come in Ed Murrow."

During the following year, leading up to the outbreak of World War II, Murrow continued to be based in London. William Shirer's reporting from Berlin brought him national acclaim and a commentator's position with CBS News upon his return to the United States in December 1940. Shirer would describe his Berlin experiences in his best-selling 1941 book Berlin Diary. When the war broke out in September 1939, Murrow stayed in London, and later provided live radio broadcasts during the height of the Blitz in London After Dark. These live, shortwave broadcasts relayed on CBS electrified radio audiences as news programming never had: previous war coverage had mostly been provided by newspaper reports, along with newsreels seen in movie theaters; earlier radio news programs had simply featured an announcer in a studio reading wire service reports.

== World War II ==
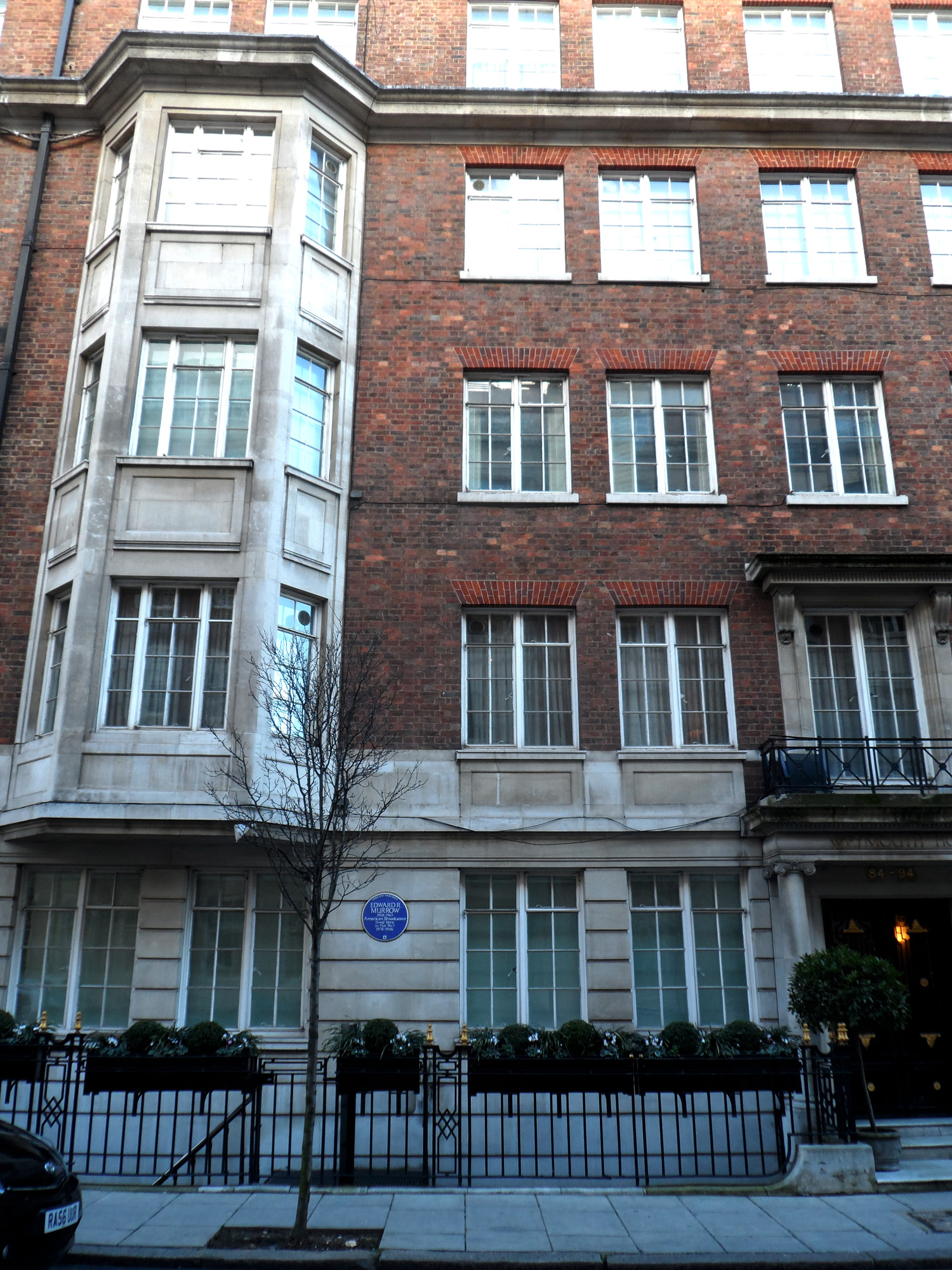
Murrow lived in a flat on Hallam Street, near Great Portland Street, in London during the War

Murrow's reports, especially during the Blitz, began with what became his signature opening, "This is London," delivered with vocal emphasis on the word this, followed by the hint of a pause before the rest of the phrase. His former speech teacher, Ida Lou Anderson, suggested the opening as a more concise alternative to the one he had inherited from his predecessor at CBS Europe, César Saerchinger: "Hello, America. This is London calling." Murrow's phrase became synonymous with the newscaster and his network.

Murrow achieved celebrity status as a result of his war reports. They led to his second famous catchphrase, at the end of 1940, with every night's German bombing raid, Londoners who might not necessarily see each other the next morning often closed their conversations with "good night, and good luck." The future British monarch, Princess Elizabeth, said as much to the Western world in a live radio address at the end of the year, when she said "good night, and good luck to you all". So, at the end of one 1940 broadcast, Murrow ended his segment with "Good night, and good luck." Speech teacher Anderson insisted he stick with it, and another Murrow catchphrase was born.

When Murrow returned to the US in 1941, CBS hosted a dinner in his honor on December 2 at the Waldorf-Astoria Hotel. 1,100 guests attended the dinner, which the network broadcast. Franklin D. Roosevelt sent a welcome-back telegram, which was read at the dinner, and Librarian of Congress Archibald MacLeish gave an encomium that commented on the power and intimacy of Murrow's wartime dispatches. "You burned the city of London in our houses and we felt the flames that burned it," MacLeish said. "You laid the dead of London at our doors and we knew that the dead were our dead, were mankind's dead. You have destroyed the superstition that what is done beyond 3,000 miles of water is not really done at all."

The Japanese attack on Pearl Harbor occurred less than a week after this speech, and the US entered the war as a combatant on the Allied side. Murrow flew on 25 Allied combat missions in Europe during the war, providing additional reports from the planes as they droned on over Europe (recorded for delayed broadcast). Murrow's skill at improvising vivid descriptions of what was going on around or below him, derived in part from his college training in speech, aided the effectiveness of his radio broadcasts.

As hostilities expanded, Murrow expanded CBS News in London into what Harrison Salisbury described as "the finest news staff anybody had ever put together in Europe". The result was a group of reporters acclaimed for their intellect and descriptive power, including Eric Sevareid, Charles Collingwood, Howard K. Smith, Mary Marvin Breckinridge, Cecil Brown, Richard C. Hottelet, Bill Downs, Winston Burdett, Charles Shaw, Ned Calmer, and Larry LeSueur. Many of them, Shirer included, were later dubbed "Murrow's Boys"—despite Breckinridge being a woman. In 1944, Murrow sought Walter Cronkite to take over for Bill Downs at the CBS Moscow bureau. Cronkite initially accepted, but after receiving a better offer from his then-current employer, United Press, he turned down the offer.

Murrow so closely cooperated with the British that in 1943 Winston Churchill offered to make him joint Director-General of the BBC in charge of programming. Although he declined the job, during the war Murrow did fall in love with Churchill's daughter-in-law, Pamela, whose other American lovers included Averell Harriman, whom she married many years later. Pamela wanted Murrow to marry her, and he considered it; however, after his wife gave birth to their only child, Casey, he ended the affair.

After the war, Murrow recruited journalists such as Alexander Kendrick, David Schoenbrun, Daniel Schorr and Robert Pierpoint into the circle of the Boys as a virtual "second generation", though the track record of the original wartime crew set it apart.

On April 12, 1945, Murrow and Bill Shadel were the first reporters at the Buchenwald concentration camp in Germany. He met emaciated survivors including Petr Zenkl, children with identification tattoos, and "bodies stacked up like cordwood" in the crematorium. In his report three days later, Murrow said:

I pray you to believe what I have said about Buchenwald. I have reported what I saw and heard, but only part of it. For most of it I have no words.... If I've offended you by this rather mild account of Buchenwald, I'm not in the least sorry.

— Extract from Murrow's Buchenwald report. April 15, 1945.

== Postwar broadcasting career ==
=== Radio ===
Harry S. Truman and Edward R. Murrow, This I Believe series, 1951–1955

In December 1945 Murrow reluctantly accepted William S. Paley's offer to become a vice president of the network and head of CBS News, and made his last news report from London in March 1946. His presence and personality shaped the newsroom. After the war, he maintained close friendships with his previous hires, including members of the Murrow Boys. Younger colleagues at CBS resented this, viewing it as preferential treatment, and formed the "Murrow Isn't God Club." The club disbanded when Murrow asked if he could join.

During Murrow's tenure as vice president, his relationship with Shirer ended in 1947 in one of the great confrontations of American broadcast journalism, when Shirer was fired by CBS. He said he resigned in the heat of an interview at the time, but was actually terminated. The dispute began when J. B. Williams, maker of shaving soap, withdrew its sponsorship of Shirer's Sunday news show. CBS, of which Murrow was then vice president for public affairs, decided to "move in a new direction," hired a new host, and let Shirer go. There are different versions of these events; Shirer's was not made public until 1990.

Shirer contended that the root of his troubles was the network and sponsor not standing by him because of his comments critical of the Truman Doctrine, as well as other comments that were considered outside of the mainstream. Shirer and his supporters felt he was being muzzled because of his views. Meanwhile, Murrow, and even some of Murrow's Boys, felt that Shirer was coasting on his high reputation and not working hard enough to bolster his analyses with his own research. Murrow and Shirer never regained their close friendship.

The episode hastened Murrow's desire to give up his network vice presidency and return to newscasting, and it foreshadowed his own problems to come with his friend Paley, boss of CBS.

Murrow and Paley had become close when the network chief himself joined the war effort, setting up Allied radio outlets in Italy and North Africa. After the war, he would often go to Paley directly to settle any problems he had. "Ed Murrow was Bill Paley's one genuine friend in CBS," noted Murrow biographer Joseph Persico.

Murrow returned to the air in September 1947, taking over the nightly 7:45 p.m. ET newscast sponsored by Campbell's Soup and anchored by his old friend and announcing coach Bob Trout. For the next several years Murrow focused on radio, and in addition to news reports he produced special presentations for CBS News Radio. In 1950, he narrated a half-hour radio documentary called The Case of the Flying Saucer. It offered a balanced look at UFOs, a subject of widespread interest at the time. Murrow interviewed both Kenneth Arnold and astronomer Donald Menzel.

From 1951 to 1955, Murrow was the host of This I Believe, which offered ordinary people the opportunity to speak for five minutes on radio. He continued to present daily radio news reports on the CBS Radio Network until 1959. He also recorded a series of narrated "historical albums" for Columbia Records called I Can Hear It Now, which inaugurated his partnership with producer Fred W. Friendly. I Can Hear It Now quickly reached No. 3 on the US albums chart. In 1950 the records evolved into a weekly CBS Radio show, Hear It Now, hosted by Murrow and co-produced by Murrow and Friendly.

=== Television and films ===
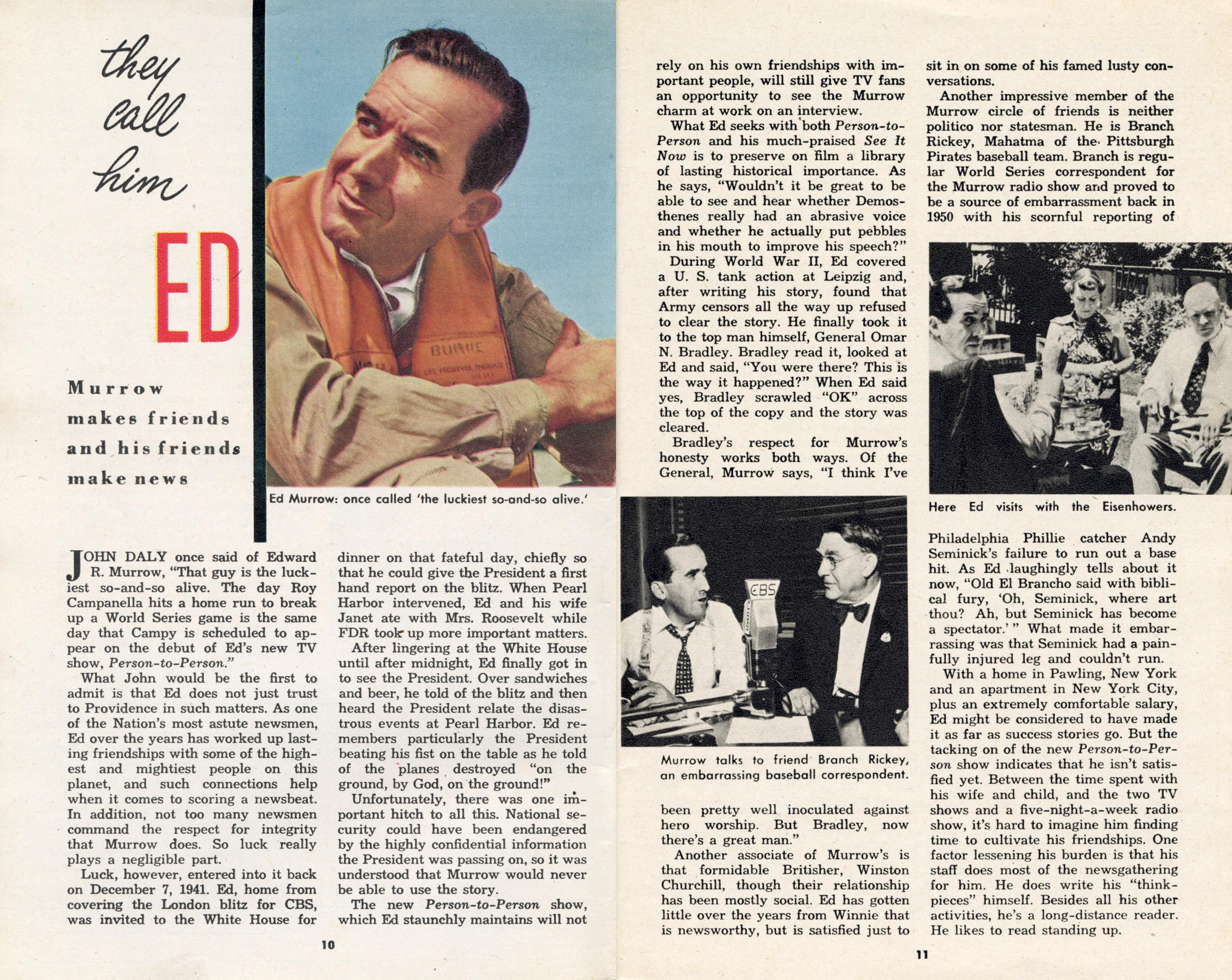
Murrow in TV Guide, November 6, 1953

As the 1950s began, Murrow began his television career by appearing in editorial "tailpieces" on the CBS Evening News and in the coverage of special events. This came despite his own misgivings about the new medium and its emphasis on image rather than ideas.

On November 18, 1951, Hear It Now moved to television and was re-christened See It Now. In the first episode, Murrow explained: "This is an old team, trying to learn a new trade."

In 1952, Murrow narrated the political documentary Alliance for Peace, an information vehicle for the newly formed SHAPE detailing the effects of the Marshall Plan upon a war-torn Europe. It was written by William Templeton and produced by Samuel Goldwyn Jr.

In 1953, Murrow launched a second weekly TV show, a series of celebrity interviews entitled Person to Person.

==== Criticism of McCarthyism ====
See It Now focused on a number of controversial issues in the 1950s, but it is best remembered as the show that criticized McCarthyism and the Red Scare, contributing, if not leading, to the political downfall of Senator Joseph McCarthy. McCarthy had previously commended Murrow for his fairness in reporting.

On June 15, 1953, Murrow hosted The Ford 50th Anniversary Show, broadcast simultaneously on NBC and CBS and seen by 60 million viewers. The broadcast closed with Murrow's commentary covering a variety of topics, including the danger of nuclear war against the backdrop of a mushroom cloud. Murrow also offered indirect criticism of McCarthyism, saying: "Nations have lost their freedom while preparing to defend it, and if we in this country confuse dissent with disloyalty, we deny the right to be wrong." Forty years after the broadcast, television critic Tom Shales recalled the broadcast as both "a landmark in television" and "a milestone in the cultural life of the '50s".

On March 9, 1954, Murrow, Friendly, and their news team produced a half-hour See It Now special titled "A Report on Senator Joseph McCarthy". Murrow had considered making such a broadcast since See It Now debuted, and was encouraged to do so by multiple colleagues, including Bill Downs. However, Friendly wanted to wait for the right time to do so. Murrow used excerpts from McCarthy's own speeches and proclamations to criticize the senator and point out episodes where he had contradicted himself. Murrow and Friendly paid for their own newspaper advertisement for the program; they were not allowed to use CBS's money for the publicity campaign or even use the CBS logo.

The broadcast contributed to a nationwide backlash against McCarthy and is seen as a turning point in the history of television. It provoked tens of thousands of letters, telegrams, and phone calls to CBS headquarters, running 15 to 1 in favor. In a retrospective produced for Biography, Friendly noted how truck drivers pulled up to Murrow on the street in subsequent days and shouted "Good show, Ed."

Murrow offered McCarthy the chance to respond to the criticism with a full half-hour on See It Now. McCarthy accepted the invitation and appeared on April 6, 1954. In his response, McCarthy rejected Murrow's criticism and accused him of being a communist sympathizer [McCarthy also accused Murrow of being a member of the Industrial Workers of the World which Murrow denied.]. McCarthy also made an appeal to the public by attacking his detractors, stating:

Ordinarily, I would not take time out from the important work at hand to answer Murrow. However, in this case I feel justified in doing so because Murrow is a symbol, a leader, and the cleverest of the jackal pack which is always found at the throat of anyone who dares to expose individual Communists and traitors.

Ultimately, McCarthy's rebuttal served only to further decrease his already fading popularity. In the program following McCarthy's appearance, Murrow commented that the senator had "made no reference to any statements of fact that we made".

==== Later television career ====
Edward R. Murrow at work with CBS, 1957

Murrow's hard-hitting approach to the news cost him influence in the world of television. See It Now occasionally scored high ratings (usually when it was tackling a particularly controversial subject), but in general, it did not score well on prime-time television.

When a quiz show phenomenon began and took TV by storm in the mid-1950s, Murrow realized the days of See It Now as a weekly show were numbered. (Biographer Joseph Persico notes that Murrow, watching an early episode of The $64,000 Question air just before his own See It Now, is said to have turned to Friendly and asked how long they expected to keep their time slot).

See It Now was knocked out of its weekly slot in 1955 after sponsor Alcoa withdrew its advertising, but the show remained as a series of occasional TV special news reports that defined television documentary news coverage. Despite the show's prestige, CBS had difficulty finding a regular sponsor, since it aired intermittently in its new time slot (Sunday afternoons at 5 p.m. ET by the end of 1956) and could not develop a regular audience.

In 1956, Murrow took time to appear as the on-screen narrator of a special prologue for Michael Todd's epic production, Around the World in 80 Days. Although the prologue was generally omitted on telecasts of the film, it was included in home video releases.

Beginning in 1958, Murrow hosted a talk show entitled Small World that brought together political figures for one-to-one debates. In January 1959, he appeared on WGBH's The Press and the People with Louis Lyons, discussing the responsibilities of television journalism.

Murrow appeared as himself in a cameo in the British film production of Sink the Bismarck! in 1960, recreating some of the wartime broadcasts he did from London for CBS.

On September 16, 1962, he introduced educational television to New York City via the maiden broadcast of WNDT, which became WNET.

==== Fall from favor ====
Murrow's reporting brought him into repeated conflicts with CBS, especially its chairman William Paley, which Friendly summarized in his book Due to Circumstances Beyond our Control. See It Now ended entirely in the summer of 1958 after a clash in Paley's office. Murrow had complained to Paley he could not continue doing the show if the network repeatedly provided (without consulting Murrow) equal time to subjects who felt wronged by the program.

According to Friendly, Murrow asked Paley if he was going to destroy See It Now, into which the CBS chief executive had invested so much. Paley replied that he did not want a constant stomach ache every time Murrow covered a controversial subject.

See It Now's final broadcast, "Watch on the Ruhr" (covering postwar Germany), aired July 7, 1958. Three months later, on October 15, 1958, in a speech before the Radio and Television News Directors Association in Chicago, Murrow blasted TV's emphasis on entertainment and commercialism at the expense of public interest in his "wires and lights" speech:

During the daily peak viewing periods, television in the main insulates us from the realities of the world in which we live. If this state of affairs continues, we may alter an advertising slogan to read: Look now, pay later.

The harsh tone of the Chicago speech seriously damaged Murrow's friendship with Paley, who felt Murrow was biting the hand that fed him. Before his death, Friendly said that the RTNDA (now Radio Television Digital News Association) address did more than the McCarthy show to break the relationship between the CBS boss and his most respected journalist.

Another contributing element to Murrow's career decline was the rise of a new crop of television journalists. Walter Cronkite's arrival at CBS in 1950 marked the beginning of a major rivalry which continued until Murrow resigned from the network in 1961. Murrow held a grudge dating back to 1944, when Cronkite turned down his offer to head the CBS Moscow bureau. With the Murrow Boys dominating the newsroom, Cronkite felt like an outsider soon after joining the network. Over time, as Murrow's career seemed on the decline and Cronkite's on the rise, the two found it increasingly difficult to work together. Cronkite's demeanor was similar to reporters Murrow had hired; the difference being that Murrow viewed the Murrow Boys as satellites rather than potential rivals, as Cronkite seemed to be.

Throughout the 1950s the two got into heated arguments stoked in part by their professional rivalry. At a dinner party hosted by Bill Downs at his home in Bethesda, Cronkite and Murrow argued over the role of sponsors, which Cronkite accepted as necessary and said "paid the rent." Murrow, who had long despised sponsors despite also relying on them, responded angrily. In another instance, an argument devolved into a "duel" in which the two drunkenly took a pair of antique dueling pistols and pretended to shoot at each other. Despite this, Cronkite went on to have a long career as an anchor at CBS.

After the end of See It Now, Murrow was invited by New York's Democratic Party to run for the Senate. Paley was enthusiastic and encouraged him to do it. Harry Truman advised Murrow that his choice was between being the junior senator from New York or being Edward R. Murrow, beloved broadcast journalist, and hero to millions. He took Truman's statement as a suggestion to decline the nomination, which he did.

After contributing to the first episode of the documentary series CBS Reports, Murrow, increasingly under physical stress due to his conflicts and frustration with CBS, took a sabbatical from summer 1959 to mid-1960, though he continued to work on CBS Reports and Small World during this period. Friendly, executive producer of CBS Reports, wanted the network to allow Murrow to again be his co-producer after the sabbatical, but he was eventually turned down.

Murrow's last major TV milestone was reporting and narrating the CBS Reports installment Harvest of Shame, a report on the plight of migrant farmworkers in the United States. Directed by Friendly and produced by David Lowe, it ran in November 1960, just after Thanksgiving.

=== Summary of television work ===
- 1951–1958 – See It Now (host)
- 1953–1959 – Person to Person (host)
- 1958–1960 – Small World (moderator and producer)

=== United States Information Agency (USIA) Director ===
External audio
- National Press Club Luncheon Speakers, Edward R. Murrow, May 24, 1961, 1:04:00, Murrow speaks starting at 7:25 about USIA, Library of Congress

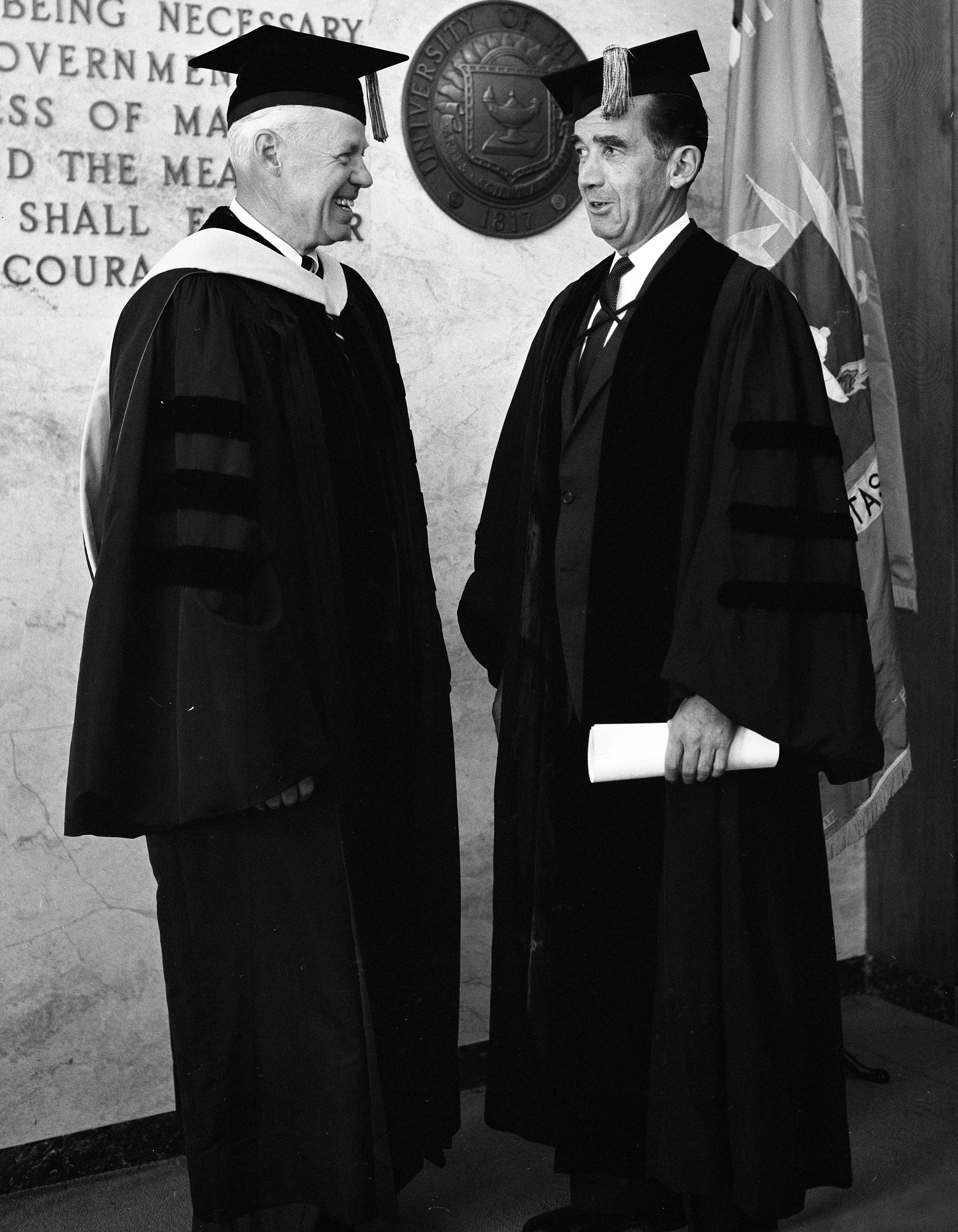
Murrow (right) with Harlan Hatcher in June 1961

Murrow resigned from CBS to accept a position as head of the United States Information Agency, parent of the Voice of America, in January 1961. President John F. Kennedy offered Murrow the position, which he viewed as "a timely gift." CBS president Frank Stanton had reportedly been offered the job but declined, suggesting that Murrow be offered the job.

His appointment as head of the United States Information Agency was seen as a vote of confidence in the agency, which provided the official views of the government to the public in other nations. The USIA had been under fire during the McCarthy era, and Murrow reappointed at least one of McCarthy's targets, Reed Harris. Murrow insisted on a high level of presidential access, telling Kennedy, "If you want me in on the landings, I'd better be there for the takeoffs." However, the early effects of cancer kept him from taking an active role in the Bay of Pigs Invasion planning. He did advise the president during the Cuban Missile Crisis but was ill at the time the president was assassinated.

Murrow was drawn into Vietnam because the USIA was assigned to convince reporters in Saigon that the government of Ngo Dinh Diem embodied the hopes and dreams of the Vietnamese people. Murrow knew the Diem government did no such thing. Asked to stay on by President Lyndon B. Johnson, Murrow did so but resigned in early 1964, citing illness. Before his departure, his last recommendation was of Barry Zorthian to be chief spokesman for the U.S. government in Saigon, Vietnam.

Murrow's celebrity gave the agency a higher profile, which may have helped it earn more funds from Congress. His transfer to a governmental position—Murrow was a member of the National Security Council—led to an embarrassing incident shortly after taking the job; he asked the BBC not to show his documentary "Harvest of Shame," in order not to damage the European view of the USA. However, the BBC refused, having bought the program in good faith. British newspapers delighted in the irony of the situation, with one Daily Sketch writer saying: "if Murrow builds up America as skilfully as he tore it to pieces last night, the propaganda war is as good as won."

== Death ==
Long a chain smoker, Murrow was almost never seen without his trademark Camel cigarette. It was reported that he smoked between 60 and 65 cigarettes a day, equivalent to roughly three packs. He developed lung cancer and lived for two years after an operation to remove his left lung.

Murrow died at his home in Pawling, New York, on April 27, 1965, two days after his 57th birthday. His colleague and friend Eric Sevareid said of him, "He was a shooting star; and we will live in his afterglow a very long time." CBS carried a memorial program, which included a rare on-camera appearance by William S. Paley, founder of CBS.

== Honors ==
- Murrow was repeatedly honored with the Peabody Award, jointly and individually.
- In 1947 Murrow received the Alfred I. duPont Award.
- In 1964, Murrow was awarded the Presidential Medal of Freedom.
- 1964: Paul White Award, Radio Television Digital News Association
- He was made an honorary Knight Commander of the Order of the British Empire by Queen Elizabeth II on March 5, 1965, and received similar honors from the governments of Belgium, France, and Sweden.
- He received "Special" George Polk Awards in 1951 and 1952.
- In 1967, he was awarded the Grammy Award for Best Spoken Word Album for his Edward R. Murrow – A Reporter Remembers, Vol. I The War Years.
- The Edward R. Murrow Award, given annually by the Radio Television Digital News Association is named in his honor; it is presented for "outstanding achievement in electronic journalism"
- The Edward R. Murrow College of Communication at Washington State University is named in his honor.
- The Edward R. Murrow Park in Washington, D.C. is named in his memory.
- Edward R. Murrow High School in Brooklyn, New York is named after him.
- Murrow Boulevard, a large thoroughfare in the heart of Greensboro, North Carolina, is named after Murrow.
- The last remaining Voice of America broadcast transmitting site in the United States, the Edward R. Murrow Transmitting Station, is named after him.
- A statue of native Edward R. Murrow stands on the grounds of the Greensboro Historical Museum.
- In 1984, Murrow was posthumously inducted into the Television Hall of Fame.
- In 1996, Murrow was ranked No. 22 on TV Guide's "50 Greatest TV Stars of All Time" list.
- The Edward R. Murrow Park in Pawling, New York was named for him.
- An English Heritage blue plaque marks the building in Hallam Street in London where Murrow lived.

== Legacy ==
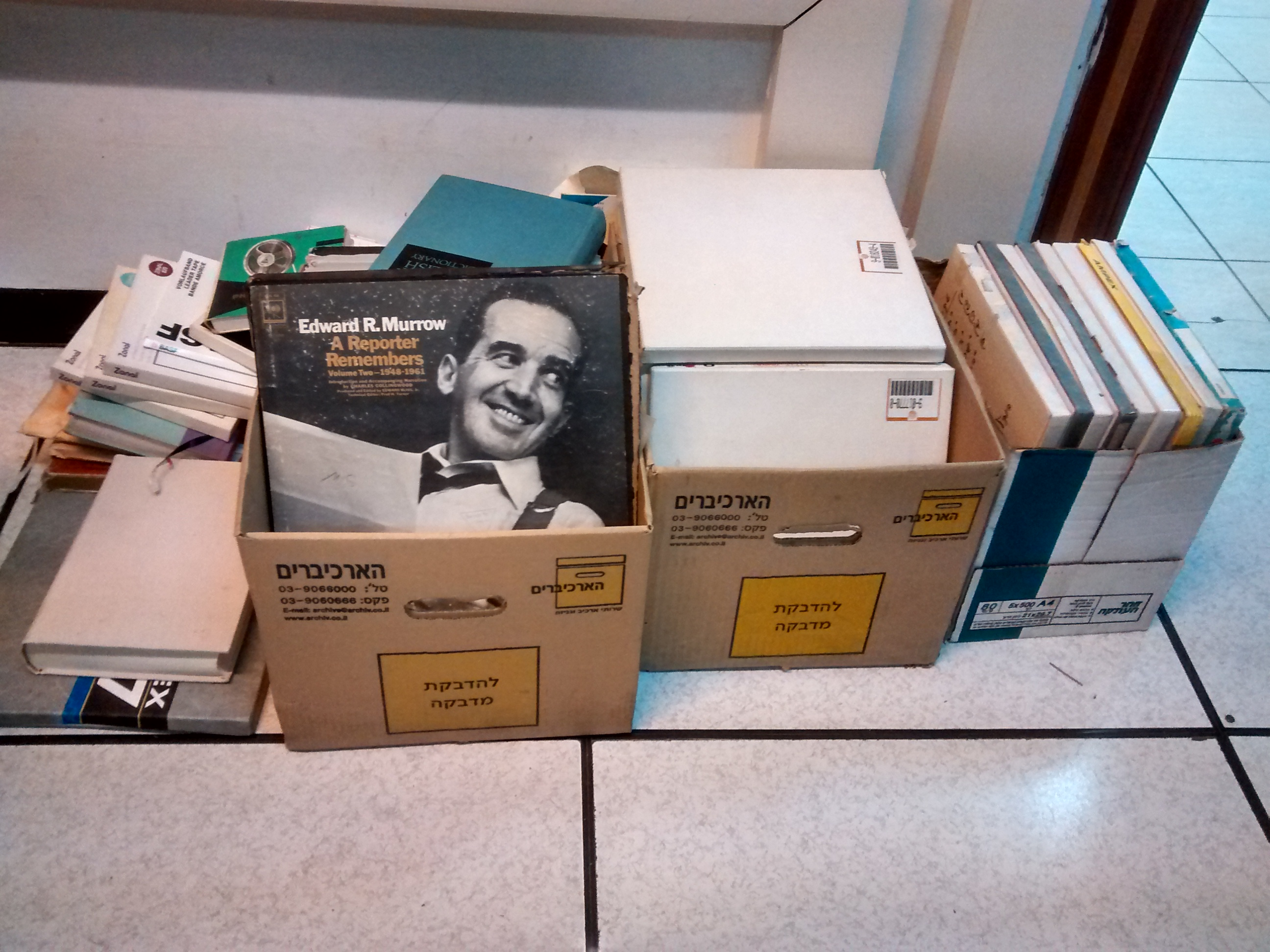
Murrow's record at the radio studios of Kol Yisrael in Jerusalem, 2016

After Murrow's death, the Edward R. Murrow Center of Public Diplomacy was established at Tufts University's Fletcher School of Law and Diplomacy. Murrow's library and selected artifacts are housed in the Murrow Memorial Reading Room that also serves as a special seminar classroom and meeting room for Fletcher activities. Murrow's papers are available for research at the Digital Collections and Archives at Tufts, which has a website for the collection and makes many of the digitized papers available through the Tufts Digital Library.

The center awards Murrow fellowships to mid-career professionals who engage in research at Fletcher, ranging from the impact of the New World Information Order debate in the international media during the 1970s and 1980s to current telecommunications policies and regulations. Many distinguished journalists, diplomats, and policymakers have spent time at the center, among them David Halberstam, who worked on his Pulitzer Prize-winning 1972 book, The Best and the Brightest, as a writer-in-residence.

Veteran journalist Crocker Snow Jr. was named director of the Murrow Center in 2005.

In 1971 the RTNDA (Now Radio Television Digital News Association) established the Edward R. Murrow Awards, honoring outstanding achievement in the field of electronic journalism. There are four other awards also known as the "Edward R. Murrow Award", including the one at Washington State University.

In 1973, Murrow's alma mater, Washington State University, dedicated its expanded communication facilities the Edward R. Murrow Communications Center and established the annual Edward R. Murrow Symposium. In 1990, the WSU Department of Communications became the Edward R. Murrow School of Communication, followed on July 1, 2008, with the school becoming the Edward R. Murrow College of Communication. Veteran international journalist Lawrence Pintak is the college's founding dean.

Several movies were filmed, either completely or partly about Murrow. In 1986, HBO broadcast the made-for-cable biographical movie, Murrow, with Daniel J. Travanti in the title role, and Robert Vaughn in a supporting role. In the 1999 film The Insider, Lowell Bergman, a television producer for the CBS news magazine 60 Minutes, played by Al Pacino, is confronted by Mike Wallace, played by Christopher Plummer, after an exposé of the tobacco industry is edited down to suit CBS management and then, itself, gets exposed in the press for the self-censorship. Wallace passes Bergman an editorial printed in The New York Times, which accuses CBS of betraying the legacy of Edward R. Murrow. Good Night, and Good Luck is a 2005 Oscar-nominated film directed, co-starring and co-written by George Clooney about the conflict between Murrow and Joseph McCarthy on See It Now. Murrow is portrayed by actor David Strathairn, who received an Oscar nomination. In the film, Murrow's conflict with CBS boss William Paley occurs immediately after his skirmish with McCarthy.

In 2003, Fleetwood Mac released their album Say You Will, featuring the track "Murrow Turning Over in His Grave". On the track, Lindsey Buckingham reflects on current news media and claims "Ed Murrow" would be shocked at the bias and sensationalism displayed by reporters in the new century if he was alive.

In 2023, a historical novel The War Begins in Paris featured several scenes with fictionalized versions of Murrow and Shirer among a group of American journalists who gathered in Paris following the Munich Accord.

From March 12 to June 8, 2025, a stage adaptation of the film Good Night, and Good Luck co-written and starring George Clooney and directed by David Cromer was performed on Broadway.

When the CBS News Radio network closed on May 22, 2026, archival audio of Murrow's sign-off was aired during the network's last-ever news bulletin, followed by a final sign-off by anchor Christopher Cruise.

== Works ==
=== Filmography ===
- Around the World in 80 Days (1956) as Prologue Narrator
- The Lost Class of '59 (1959) as himself
- Montgomery Speaks His Mind (1959) as himself
- Sink the Bismarck! (1960) as himself (final film role)
- Murrow (1986) made-for-cable biographical movie, starring Daniel J. Travanti in the title role and directed by Jack Gold, originally broadcast by HBO
- Good Night, and Good Luck, 2005 historical drama portraying the conflict between Murrow and U.S. Senator Joseph McCarthy, especially relating to the anti-Communist Senator's actions with the Senate Permanent Subcommittee on Investigations, starring David Strathairn, and directed by George Clooney

=== Books ===
- Rise of the Vice Presidency by Irving G. Williams, introduced by Edward R. Murrow (Washington: Public Affairs Press, 1956)

== External links and references ==
- Appearances on C-SPAN
- "The Life and Work of Edward R. Murrow: an archives exhibit". Digital Collections and Archives, Tufts University. Archived from the original on September 22, 2018.
- Edward R. and Janet Brewster Murrow papers, Mount Holyoke College Archives and Special Collections, MS 0576, archived from the original on February 24, 2021

=== Biographies and articles ===
- Edward R. Murrow bibliography via UC Berkeley library
- New York Times obituary, April 28, 1965
- Museum of Broadcast Communications, biography
- Edward R. Murrow and the Time of His Time by Joseph Wershba, CBS News writer, editor and correspondent, beginning in 1944; producer of 60 Minutes (1968–1988)
- State Library of North Carolina, biography
- Block, Maxine; Trow, E. Mary (1970). "Murrow, Edward R.". Current Biography: Who's News and Why, 1942. H.W. Wilson. ISBN 0824204794.
- Cloud, Stanley; Olson, Lynne (1996). The Murrow Boys: Pioneers on the Front Lines of Broadcast Journalism. Houghton Mifflin. ISBN 0395680840.
- Edwards, Bob (2010) [2004]. Edward R. Murrow and the Birth of Broadcast Journalism. Turning Points in History. Vol. 12. John Wiley & Sons. ISBN 978-1-118-03999-1.
- Kendrick, Alexander (1969). Prime Time: The Life of Edward R. Murrow. J. M. Dent & Sons. ISBN 046003958X.
- Lichello, Robert (1971). Edward R. Murrow: Broadcaster of Courage. Charlottesville, N.Y.: Samhar Press. ISBN 978-0-87157-504-3.
- Murrow, Edward R.; Bliss, Edward (1967). In search of light; the broadcasts of Edward R. Murrow, 1938–1961. New York: Alfred A. Knopf. OCLC 743433.
- "Murrow, Edward R.". American National Biography: Mosler–Parish. Vol. 16. Oxford University Press. 1999. ISBN 0195206355.
- Olson, Lynne (2010). Citizens of London: The Americans Who Stood with Britain in Its Darkest, Finest Hour. Random House. ISBN 978-1-58836-982-6.
- Sperber, A. M. (1998) [1986]. Murrow, His Life and Times. Fordham University Press. ISBN 978-0-8232-1882-0.

=== Programs ===
- Edward R. Murrow at the National Radio Hall of Fame
- Original This I Believe transcript, 1951.
- Murrow radio broadcasts on Earthstation 1, Selected World War II broadcasts from London and Germany
