= Cecil Brown (journalist) =

War correspondent

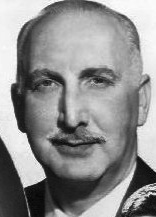
- Cecil Brown in 1961
- Born: Cecil Borida Brown; September 14, 1907; New Brighton, Pennsylvania, U.S.
- Died: October 25, 1987 (aged 80); Los Angeles, California, U.S.
- Occupations: Journalist; War correspondent

Cecil Brown (September 14, 1907 – October 25, 1987) was an American journalist and war correspondent who worked closely with Edward R. Murrow during World War II. He was the author of the book Suez to Singapore, which describes the sinking of HMS Repulse in December 1941. He also has a star on the Hollywood Walk of Fame for his contribution to radio.

== Background and early career ==
Brown was born Cecil Broida Brown on September 14, 1907, in New Brighton, Pennsylvania. After graduating from Ohio State University in 1929, Brown left the United States for the Mediterranean and Black Seas where he worked as a seaman. He eventually returned to the United States where he worked as a journalist at several small newspapers. By 1937 he was back in Europe working as a freelancer.

== Career at CBS ==
CBS hired Brown in 1940 as their correspondent in Rome, where he openly criticized the regime of Benito Mussolini. In 1941 the Italian government cited Brown's "continued hostile attitude" and expelled him from the country. After his expulsion from Italy, CBS sent Brown to Singapore. In December 1941, while Brown was in Singapore, he was invited to join the Royal Navy battlecruiser HMS Repulse and her consort, the brand-new battleship HMS Prince of Wales as they sailed to counter-attack Japanese invasion forces threatening Malaya, attempting to intercept and destroy convoys. On December 10, 1941, at 03:13 GMT (11:13 SGT), the capital ships of Force Z were subjected to a sustained aerial attack by land-based Japanese bomber aircraft. Repulse was sunk at 04:33 GMT (12:33 SGT), followed by the crippled Prince of Wales at 05:13 GMT (13:18 SGT), less than sixty hours after the commencement of the Attack on Pearl Harbor. Of 1309 sailors on board Repulse, Brown was one of only 513 survivors.

His experiences in his long journey and dealings with Italian, British, and other censorship authorities led him to write Suez to Singapore which was published in 1942. His criticism of the British in Singapore caused him to have his "war corresponent" credentials revoked and made him a persona non grata. He narrowly escaped from Singapore before its fall to the Japanese. He was part of a larger group of reporters known as Murrow's Boys.

In September 1943, Brown resigned from CBS after being rebuked by CBS news director Paul White for expressing an editorial opinion during an August 25 news broadcast. Brown had stated that "a good deal of the enthusiasm for this war is evaporating into thin air." Announcing his resignation Brown said that he could not subscribe to what he characterized as CBS' policy of "non-opinionated" news.

== Career after CBS ==
After leaving CBS Brown covered the rest of the war at home, in the United States, for the Mutual Network. When World War II ended, Brown continued to work in broadcast journalism as a correspondent for Mutual, NBC and ABC. He retired from broadcasting in 1967 and went to work as a professor of communication arts at Cal Poly Pomona where he worked until he died in 1987.

== Book ==
Brown's book, Suez to Singapore, was published by Macmillan in 1942. The 533-page volume related some of the information about World War II that he was unable to report on radio. A newspaper review said that the book revealed the incompetence of military officials in Singapore, then it added, "However, Brown's bitterness about the whole thing spoils his book and makes it pretty dull reading."

== Death ==
Brown died of a ruptured aorta on October 25, 1987, in the University of California Medical Center at Los Angeles, aged 80.

== Honors ==
- Overseas Press Club: Best Reporter Award
- 1941: Peabody Award for Outstanding Reporting of the News
- 1965: Alfred I. duPont Award
