= William H. Sadlier, Inc. =

American publishing company

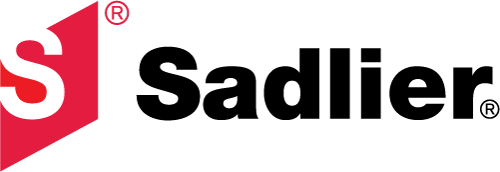
- Type: Private
- Industry: Publishing
- Founded: 1832; 194 years ago
- Founders: Denis Sadlier; James Sadlier
- Headquarters: New York City, U.S.
- Key people: Theresa Thompson (President and CEO); Thomas Allen (Chief Operating and Financial Officer)
- Products: Books
- Owner: Sadlier Dinger family
- Website: www.sadlier.com

William H. Sadlier, Inc. is an American educational publishing company that publishes educational content, software, and services for pre-K-12. It is based in New York City, U.S.

William H. Sadlier is one of the oldest family-owned publishing companies in the United States.

== History ==
William H. Sadlier was founded as D&J Sadlier in 1832 by two Irish-born brothers, Denis and James Sadlier, who emigrated from Cashel, County Tipperary to the United States and began publishing materials under the aforementioned name.

In the 1840s, D&J Sadlier established a Canadian branch of the company in Montreal.

In 1857, it acquired a weekly newspaper which was founded as American Celt by Thomas d'Arcy McGee. The newspaper was renamed as the New York Tablet after the acquisition.

In 1872, after working with his uncles at D&J Sadlier since 1860, William H. Sadlier founded his separate eponymous branch of the publishing firm. Later, D&J Sadlier was merged into William H. Sadlier Company. William's wife, Annie, also joined the newly founded business and kept running it as a family business after William's death Writing as Mrs. J. Sadlier, Mary Anne Sadlier, wife of James Sadlier, translated seventeen religious books from their original French and wrote twenty-three inspirational novels.

In 1907, Annie's son, Frank X. Sadlier, joined the company on a leadership position. He introduced new programs in history and geography, as well as acquired rights to D&J Sadlier imprint.

In 1927, F. Sadlier Dinger, son of William H. and Annie Sadlier, joined the company, working alongside his uncle, Frank.

In 1928, the company was incorporated as William H. Sadlier, Inc.

In the 1930s, Dinger proposed that traditional questions and answers of the Baltimore Catechism be accompanied by exercises, explanatory material, and tests. Written by Ellamay Horan, Sadlier's Baltimore Catechism with study lessons was soon a success. During this time, Sadlier began to publish new history texts with full-color art, a series of poetry books for elementary grades, and a series of spelling books developed for the New York City public schools.

In 1932, Anne Cassidy Sadlier, a president of the company, died and was succeeded by his son, Francis X. Sadlier, as the president.

In 1939, William H. Sadlier started a spelling series for New York City public schools and a poetry series for elementary grades. In the same year, Frank Sadlier died and succeeded by F. Sadlier Dinger.

In 1943, the company published its Progress in Arithmetic series.

In 1945, after the culmination of World War II, Neva H. Sadlier, widow of Frank, became chairperson of the board, Frank M. Power became president, and F. Sadlier Dinger became CEO of the company.

In the late 1950s, Sadlier pioneered the kerygmatic approach to catechetics, drawing upon the fourfold revelation of Jesus through scripture, liturgy, doctrine, and Christian witness. This resulting series, called On Our Way, was developed by Maria de la Cruz with the advice of Johannes Hofinger.

In the 1970s, the company acquired the Oxford Book Company and started to expand its offerings in the academic subjects such as social studies, language arts, and mathematics.

In 1973, Sadlier published its first bilingual Spanish-English textbook, Jesus Nos Dice.

In 2008, Frank and William Sadlier Dinger were inducted into the AEP Hall of Fame by the Association of Educational Publishers for their lifetime achievements in educational publishing.

In 2017, Raymond D. Fagan became the president and chief executive officer (CEO) of the company who served until September 2022. Theresa Thompson was appointed president and CEO, effective September 6, 2022.

== Imprints ==
Sadlier comprises two imprints:

- Sadlier School, which publishes academic basal and supplemental programs for K–12.
- Sadlier Religion, which publishes catechetical programs for K–adult.

== Corporate affairs ==
=== Presidents ===
- William H. Sadlier
- Annie M. Cassidy Sadlier (1877–1932)
- Francis X. Sadlier (1932–1939)
- F. Sadlier Dinger (1939–1945)
- Frank M. Power (1945–1974)
- Ralph J. Fletcher (1974–1984)
- Elinor R. Ford (1984–1991)
- William Sadlier Dinger (1991–2017)
- Raymond D. Fagan (2017–2022)
- Theresa Thompson (2022-Present)

=== Management ===
Direct descendants of the Sadlier Dinger family are continuing the tradition. Melissa Gibbons is Director of Customer Service, and William Sadlier Dinger Jr. serves as VP International Sales.

== Titles and series ==
=== School ===
==== Mathematics ====
- Progress in Mathematics
- Progress Mathematics
- New York Progress Mathematics
- Sadlier Math

==== Vocabulary ====
- Vocabulary Workshop, Tools for Comprehension
- Vocabulary Workshop, Tools for Excellence
- Vocabulary Workshop Achieve
- Vocabulary for Success

==== English language arts ====
- Progress English Language Arts

==== Grammar & Writing ====
- Grammar Workshop, Tools for Writing
- Grammar for Writing

==== Reading ====
- From Phonics to Reading by Wiley Blevins
- Close Reading of Complex Texts

=== Religion ===
- We Believe/Creemos
- Christ in Us/Cristo en Nosotros

== Awards ==
- F. Sadlier Dinger Award
- William Sadlier Dinger Award
- Sister Rose Anita McDonnell, IHM Award
- Catholic Identity Award
