= Charles Shaw (journalist) =

American journalist

Charles Shaw (June 25, 1911 – December 14, 1987), was an American journalist who worked with Edward R. Murrow during World War II and then went on to be News Director and broadcast journalist at WCAU-TV, the CBS affiliate in Philadelphia.

Shaw was born in Charleroi, Pennsylvania, near Pittsburgh.

While at WCAU in the early 1950s, he was one of the first broadcast journalists to speak out against Senator Joseph McCarthy, even before Murrow did so.

In the late 1950s, Shaw was drawn to the story of the burgeoning Cuban revolution, and he travelled to Cuba to secretly meet with Fidel Castro and his brother Raúl Castro in the mountains of southern Cuba. When Castro came to power, Shaw was invited to Cuba by the new government, and he was also given a commendation by Castro when the new Cuban leader visited Washington in the early 1960s, before relations between the two governments turned sour.

After leaving CBS in the early 1960s, Shaw became editor of the Bucks County Gazette, in New Hope, Pennsylvania.
