= Hear It Now =

US radio program

Hear It Now, an American radio program on CBS, began on December 15, 1950, ending in June 1951. It was hosted by Edward R. Murrow and produced by Murrow and Fred W. Friendly. It ran for one hour on Fridays at 9 pm Eastern Time.

== The show's beginnings ==
The Columbia Records album I Can Hear It Now 1933–1945 (1948) was described in the book Biographical Dictionary of Radio as "a spectacular critical and commercial success". The boxed-set album consisted of five 78 rpm recordings, totaling about 45 minutes of sound, and it was the first documentary recording to become widely popular. A collaboration between Murrow and Friendly, it interwove historical events with speeches and Murrow's narration and marked the beginning of one of the most famous pairings in journalism history.

The huge success of the record (and two follow-up albums released in 1949 and 1950) prompted the pair to parlay it into a weekly radio show for CBS, called Hear It Now. Originally, the series was to have been titled Report to the Nation, and was identified as such when it was announced as the following week's replacement for Broadway Is My Beat at the end of its December 8, 1950, episode. (Note: Ralph Engelman's book Friendlyvision: Fred Friendly and the Rise and Fall of Television Journalism, says, "On November 9, 1950, ... the new broadcast team produced for CBS radio A Report to the Nation—The 1950 Election. A CBS press release said that the program would be 'the first in a series of projected documentary productions which Murrow will do on CBS radio and TV.'") Before its premiere, though, CBS retitled it Hear It Now to capitalize on the popularity of Murrow's albums.

The hour-long program was carried on 173 stations.

== Format ==
The show had a "magazine" format. It sought to include a variety of sounds from current events such as an atom smasher at work or artillery fire from Korea. It was the artillery fire that produced one of the show's more poignant moments as it backdropped the words of American soldiers fighting the Korean War. The entire premise of the show was to include the "actual sound of history in the making", according to Murrow. Some of the show's audio was what Time magazine called "fairly routine" in 1950. Such soundbites as Communist China's General Wu and Russia's Andrei Vishinsky along with U.S. Ambassador to the United Nations Warren Austin were included among those routinely used. But Time also lauded the "vivid reality" created by the aforementioned artillery clips, comments from wounded U.S. marines or Carl Sandburg's recital of his The People, Yes.

The legwork involved in producing the program often exceeded the amount of programming culled from the reporting. For an hour and a half of interviews in Koto the duo was able to use 21 seconds of the material on the air. The program also shied away from the traditional use of string music common to many radio shows of the time period. Instead the show relied on composers such as David Diamond and Lehman Engel to produce its music.

Murrow anchored the show with news and editorial commentary but Hear It Now also featured regular oral columns and features.

- Red Barber: covered sports
- comic Abe Burrows: covered drama
- Don Hollenbeck: covered the media
- Bill Leonard: covered movies

The show wrapped up each week's broadcast with a four to ten minute "closeup". An example of the subject matter of the closeup was General of the Army Douglas MacArthur.

== Impact of television ==
The rising importance of television compelled a reluctant Murrow in 1951 to introduce a TV version of the radio show, called See It Now. With the inception of See It Now, Hear It Now ended its on-air run.

== Recognition ==
Hear It Now received an honorable mention in the 1950 Peabody Awards. The citation called the program "a brilliant application of tape-recording to the purpose of the news summary, by which the listener is privileged to hear the news from the very individuals who made it".
