= Alexander Kendrick =

American journalist

Alexander Kendrick (July 6, 1910 in Philadelphia – May 17, 1991) was a broadcast journalist. He worked for CBS during World War II and was part of a second generation of reporters known as Murrow's Boys.

Before partnering with Edward R. Murrow, Kendrick had worked at newspapers in Chicago and Philadelphia.

Kendrick covered World War II in Europe once he had joined Murrow and CBS. During the war he traveled on Murmansk Run and covered the Eastern Front. After the war ended, Kendrick became the London Bureau Chief for CBS.

He is often remembered for helping to bring Dan Rather into journalism.

Kendrick was also credited by Walter Cronkite as being Ed Sullivan's source of discovering the Beatles.

== Books ==
- Prime Time: The Life of Edward R. Murrow (1969)
- The Wound Within; America in the Vietnam Years, 1945-1974 (1974)
