= Janet Huntington Brewster =

American radio broadcaster (1910–1998)

Janet H. Brewster
- Born: September 18, 1910; Middletown, Connecticut, US
- Died: December 18, 1998 (aged 88); Needham, Massachusetts, US
- Education: Mount Holyoke College
- Occupations: Relief worker, philanthropist, radio broadcaster and writer
- Known for: Broadcasting for CBS on the British home front; Serving as a trustee of Mount Holyoke College from 1949 to 1959
- Spouse: Edward R. Murrow (m. 1935; died 1965)
- Children: 1
- Relatives: Kingman Brewster Jr. (cousin)

Janet Huntington Brewster (September 18, 1910 – December 18, 1998) was an American philanthropist, writer, radio broadcaster and relief worker during World War II in London. She was the wife of broadcaster Edward R. Murrow.

== Life ==
Coat of arms of William Brewster

Born in Middletown, Connecticut, on September 18, 1910, Janet Huntington Brewster was daughter of Charles Huntington Brewster, a prosperous automobile dealer, and Jennie Johnson, the daughter of Swedish immigrants. Her grandfather, Charles Kingman Brewster, was the county commissioner of Hampshire County, Massachusetts. She was a direct descendant of spiritual elder William Brewster, (c. 1567–1644), the Pilgrim leader of the Plymouth Colony and a passenger on the Mayflower, through his son Jonathan Brewster. She was also a descendant of Mayflower passenger John Howland Her first cousin was Kingman Brewster Jr.

== Education ==
She graduated from Middletown High School in Middletown, Connecticut, in 1929. While attending high school, she was an outstanding student, head of the debating society and editor of the school magazine. She received her B.A. in economics and sociology in 1933 from Mount Holyoke College in South Hadley, Massachusetts. As a student leader at Mount Holyoke, she met Edward R. Murrow, a graduate of Washington State College, now Washington State University, in Pullman, Washington, and president of the National Student Federation of America.

After graduating from college, she considered working at the Henry Street Settlement House in New York, where many years later she would serve on the board. She also considered acting as a career. She was a talented actress who played several roles for a summer stock company in New London, New Hampshire, including the lead role in Sidney Howard's, The Late Christopher Bean. She ultimately moved back with her parents and taught freshman English and commercial law at the high school in Middletown, Connecticut.

== Marriage and family ==
She married Edward Murrow on March 12, 1935, at her parents' home in Middletown, Connecticut. They honeymooned in Mexico and settled in New York City so he could begin his career at CBS.

Janet and Edward were the parents of one child, a son, Charles Casey Murrow, born 1945, in west London. He was a 1964 graduate of Milton Academy in Milton, Massachusetts, and a 1968 graduate of Yale University and is currently an educator in Vermont as well as a co-director of Synergy Learning. He married Liza Ketchum in 1968 and they are the parents of two sons.

== War years ==
During the Battle of Britain, under the name Janet Murrow, she broadcast for CBS on the British home front. She arranged for the evacuation of children, not to the English countryside, but to homes generously offered in the United States. She served on the British-American Liaison Board, which helped to ease friction between American GIs and British civilians.

She traveled throughout England lecturing for the American Embassy and for the Ministry of Information on American life to schools, civil defense units, and other groups. She also gave a course on American history on BBC schools programmes. In 1946, she was awarded the King's Medal for Freedom in recognition of her services to international understanding.

== Post-war career ==
She was noted for her work in several organizations, including serving as a trustee of Mount Holyoke College from 1949 to 1959. She had always hankered after an academic career and returned to Mount Holyoke College in 1970. She worked for nine years in its Art Museum, eventually becoming the Executive Director of the Art Advisory Committee. She traveled widely, raising over US$2m on behalf of the college. She also served on the boards of National Public Radio and the Henry Street Settlement in Greenwich Village.

In 1953, Janet and Edward reported together on the coronation of Queen Elizabeth II, and on June 21, 1957, she substituted for her husband, who was in Burma, on Person to Person. Viewers and press reviews lauded her performance, and the program was soon considered one of the best in this popular series.

In the decades following her husband's death, she was tirelessly active in furthering his legacy. She donated some of Murrow's papers to the Edward R. Murrow Center of Public Diplomacy at the Fletcher School of Law and Diplomacy at Tufts University, and her own papers plus the remaining papers of her husband to Mount Holyoke College.

=== Death ===
She died on December 18, 1998, in Needham, Massachusetts. After cremation, her ashes were scattered.
