= David Schoenbrun =

American journalist

- Born: David Franz Schoenbrun; March 15, 1915; New York City, U.S.
- Died: May 23, 1988 (aged 73); New York City, U.S.
- Education: City College of New York
- Occupation: Journalist
- Spouse: Dorothy Schoenbrun
- Children: 1

David Franz Schoenbrun (March 15, 1915 – May 23, 1988) was an American broadcast journalist.

== Biography ==
Schoenbrun was born in New York City in 1915. He began his career teaching French and Spanish after graduating from City College in 1934.

Schoenbrun enlisted in the Army in 1943 and became a World War II correspondent covering North Africa through to the liberation of France, for which he was decorated with the Croix de Guerre and the Legion of Honour. Schoenbrun was recruited to Camp Ritchie for his knowledge of French and is considered to be one of the Ritchie Boys.

After the war, from 1947 to 1964, Schoenbrun worked for CBS, serving primarily as the network's bureau chief in Paris, where he met and interviewed the President Charles de Gaulle a number of times. He was one of the reporters known as Murrow's Boys.

In 1959, at the age of 44, Schoenbrun received the Alfred I. duPont Award.

From the 1960s through the 1980s, Schoenbrun served as a news analyst for WNEW Radio in New York (now WBBR) and other Metromedia broadcast properties, and later for crosstown WPIX Television and its Independent Network News operation. In the mid-1970s, he served as a foreign affairs analyst for a short-lived public television channel in Los Angeles.

Schoenbrun is the author of On and Off the Air, a personal account of the history of CBS News through the 1970s. Schoenbrun also wrote several books concerning World-War-II-era France and other works drawn from his experiences as a newsman.

Schoenbrun died of a heart attack in New York City, at the age of 73.

== Bibliography ==
- Schoenbrun, David (1957). As France Goes. Harper. ASIN B0006D8POY.
- Schoenbrun, David (1963). Casebook of a Southern Senator. Esquire. ASIN B0007FRPN8.
- Schoenbrun, David (1968). Vietnam: How We Got In, How To Get Out. Holiday House. ISBN 978-0689102424.
- Schoenbrun, David (1968). The Three Lives of Charles de Gaulle. Atheneum Books. ASIN B0000CN0TD.
- Schoenbrun, David (1973). The New Israelis. Atheneum Books. ASIN B000P1QLIE.
- Schoenbrun, David (1976). Triumph in Paris: The exploits of Benjamin Franklin. Harper & Row. ISBN 978-0060138547.
- Schoenbrun, David (1980). Soldiers of the Night. E. P. Dutton. ISBN 978-0525206637.
- Schoenbrun, David (1986). America Inside Out. Mcgraw-Hill. ISBN 978-0070554771.
- Schoenbrun, David (1989). On and off the Air: An Informal History of CBS News. Dutton Adult. ISBN 978-0525247654.
- Schoenbrun, David (1990). Maquis: The Story of the French Resistance. Robert Hale Ltd. ISBN 978-0709042341.

== See also ==
- Appeal of June 18
