= Richard C. Hottelet =

American broadcast journalist (1917-2014)

- Born: Richard Curt Hottelet; September 22, 1917; Brooklyn, New York, U.S.
- Died: December 17, 2014 (aged 97); Wilton, Connecticut, U.S.
- Occupations: Journalist; War correspondent
- Spouse: Ann Delafield Hottelet (1942–2013)

Richard Curt Hottelet (September 22, 1917 – December 17, 2014) was an American broadcast journalist for the latter half of the twentieth century.

Hottelet was the last surviving member of the Murrow Boys, a World War II-era team of war correspondents recruited by Edward R. Murrow at CBS.

== Early life ==
Hottelet was born in Brooklyn on Sept. 22, 1917. He was the son of German immigrants; the home language was German. He graduated from Brooklyn College in 1937, and then enrolled at the University of Berlin.

== Hottelet at United Press ==
At the start of World War II, Hottelet worked for United Press. As a correspondent for UP, he was arrested by Germans under suspicion of being a spy. He was released in 1941 during a U.S.-German prisoner exchange.

== Hottelet in prison ==
On Saturday, March 15, 1941, at 7 a.m., Richard C. Hottelet was confronted in his Berlin apartment by members of the German secret police. He was taken to the old police presidium at the Alexanderplatz in Berlin. Once there, he was informed that he would be held as a "guest" until some certain papers arrived from another department. As a guest Hottelet was finger printed, photographed and placed in a cell in the police prison in the same building.

That first evening, after a dinner of sauerkraut, Hottelet received some preliminary questioning and was denied being told the reason he was being held. The police took his eyeglasses, to prevent suicide, and denied him reading material as well. Hottelet described the first three days of his four-month ordeal as "the hardest and longest I ever spent." Hottelet didn't receive a formal questioning session until the following Tuesday.

On Tuesday, March 18, the secret police finally revealed to Hottelet why he was being held, "suspicion of espionage," they told him. The police, he wrote, were very friendly, "we are your friends and we want to help you," they told him.

Hottelet flatly denied any knowledge or dealings in espionage. The police were not pleased, they threatened him, threatened to use "the brutal methods of the American police," with the help of klieg lights.

During the weeks at Alexanderplatz, Hottelet endured assorted mental anguish, threats and fear. After one session of questioning beneath the klieg lights a police officer leaned toward Hottelet and asked him if he had heard of a man named Tourou. Hottelet hadn't. "He was one of the brutal specialists in third degree in the New York police, and we can use exactly the same methods he used on Johanna Hofmann," the interrogator responded.

The first week in prison brought a visit from a member of the American consulate in Berlin. He was given clothing, but the toothbrush, soap and toothpaste sent with the clothing were withheld for reasons unknown to Hottelet.

At Alexanderplatz, Hottelet found himself amongst people of many nations and faiths, represented among the population were: Russians, Czechs, Poles, Japanese, Italians and Catholic priests. The first few weeks as a prisoner didn't yield much exercise for Hottelet or his prison-mates. Exercise consisted of one half-hour weekly session of walking around in a circle in a 15×40 yard courtyard. As the weather improved, those sessions increased to twice weekly.

The last few weeks at Alexanderplatz were significantly less grueling. Sessions with the secret police became less frequent and Hottelet maintains he was never mistreated. On May 31, he was transferred to the investigation prison, Moabit, in another part of Berlin. The building housed about 2,000 prisoners in its four-story frame.

Moabit was a much stricter place than Alexanderplatz, no secret contacts with other prisoners, no smoking, but better food. After four weeks at Moabit, Hottelet was finally allowed to receive a daily newspaper and two books per week from the prison library. The guards at Moabit always brought him the English selections, which were not always pleasing to Hottelet. He once received "The Fuel Problem of Canada," and an 1867 book of verse for young women. Some reading material did please him. Robert Louis Stevenson, Sir Walter Scott and poetry by Robert Burns. The most interesting reading, he found, was Oscar Wilde's "De Profundis," which was written as Wilde served a two-year English prison sentence.

The prisoners at Moabit were given work to complete in their cells. The work consisted of "pasting tissue paper over the windows of doll houses and twirling little throwaways for the Reich lottery." At the end of his nine weeks in Moabit, Hottelet collected his full salary of 4.50 marks or about $1.80. The prisoners exercised a half-hour daily, save for Sundays. Moabit exercises consisted of walking around and calisthenics.

The days became depressing and marked by rigid routine. Military discipline was enforced and prisoners made to take regular army marching orders, though most of the prisoners had military training. Twice a day the prisoners would receive half-gallon jugs of water, with which to wash themselves, their dishes and flush their toilets. Hottelet and the other prisoners received "German haircuts" at the discretion of the barber. The hairstyles were less than desirable.

On July 8, 1941, after almost four months, Hottelet had a pleasant surprise. A guard came to his cell door, opened it and told him to pack his things. Hottelet asked if he was being released or transferred, and when the guard told him released he was flabbergasted.

He collected his belongings and was moved to a transport cell for about an hour. The Germans turned over his money, including his 4.50 marks, and valuables and turned him over to the custody of a representative of the American Embassy.

From July 8 to 17 Hottelet left Berlin and lived "incognito" with an American Embassy representative. After his release on July 8 he had no further contact with any secret police or German officials. On July 23, Hottelet crossed the Franco-Spanish border.

== Hottelet at CBS ==
Hottelet was hired by Edward R. Murrow in January 1944. On D-Day he aired the first eyewitness account of the seaborne invasion of Normandy; Hottelet rode along in a bomber that attacked Utah Beach six minutes before H-Hour. He also covered the Battle of the Bulge for CBS. Later, he parachuted to safety when the plane he was in was shot down by enemy fire.

While working in Belgium, shortly after D-Day, Hottelet received a memo from then General Eisenhower that allowed reporters "to talk freely with officers and enlisted personnel and to see the machinery of war in operation in order to visualize and transmit to the public the conditions under which men from their countries are waging war against the enemy."

Under these conditions with what he called "fussy" censorship rules, but not crippling, Hottelet set out from the U.S. First Army press camp in Spa, Belgium for the Fourth Division headquarters in Hürtgen Forest. He was surprised by commanders when he arrived telling him of a German paratrooper landing the night before and a big battle going on to the south. As it turned out, it was the beginning of the Battle of the Bulge, which Hottelet reported later.

In 1946, he was assigned to Moscow to report on the beginnings of the Cold War. That same year the Soviet government applied a ban on all foreign radio broadcasts, despite an appeal sent to Joseph Stalin by Murrow, who at that time was a vice president at CBS.

Later in his career, Hottelet was CBS News resident correspondent at the United Nations in New York, reporting on speeches given by world leaders in the General Assembly and current world events which were on the agenda of the Security Council.

Hottelet stayed with CBS for 41 years.

== Life after CBS ==
After leaving CBS, Hottelet continued to write op-ed pieces and lecture. In 2001, he began writing commentary for The Christian Science Monitor, which he continued to do through 2005. Hottelet guest lectured classes in the early 2000s at George Washington University and participated in the opening of the University's Media and Public Affairs Building in 2002. In March 2005, he accepted a two-year appointment as a GW Welling Presidential Fellow at GWU.

He also appeared as a panelist on GW's Kalb Report forum series at The National Press Club. Accepting an award there for his career in journalism on August 10, 2011, Hottelet received a standing ovation for his short acceptance speech:

Thank you very much. I just want to tell you, I tried.

A collection of papers pertaining to Hottelet's work from 1948 to 1990 is cared for by GW's Special Collections Research Center, located in the Estelle and Melvin Gelman Library.

He died at his home in Wilton, Connecticut, on December 17, 2014. He was 97 years old.
