= Robert Trout =

American broadcast news reporter (1909–2000)

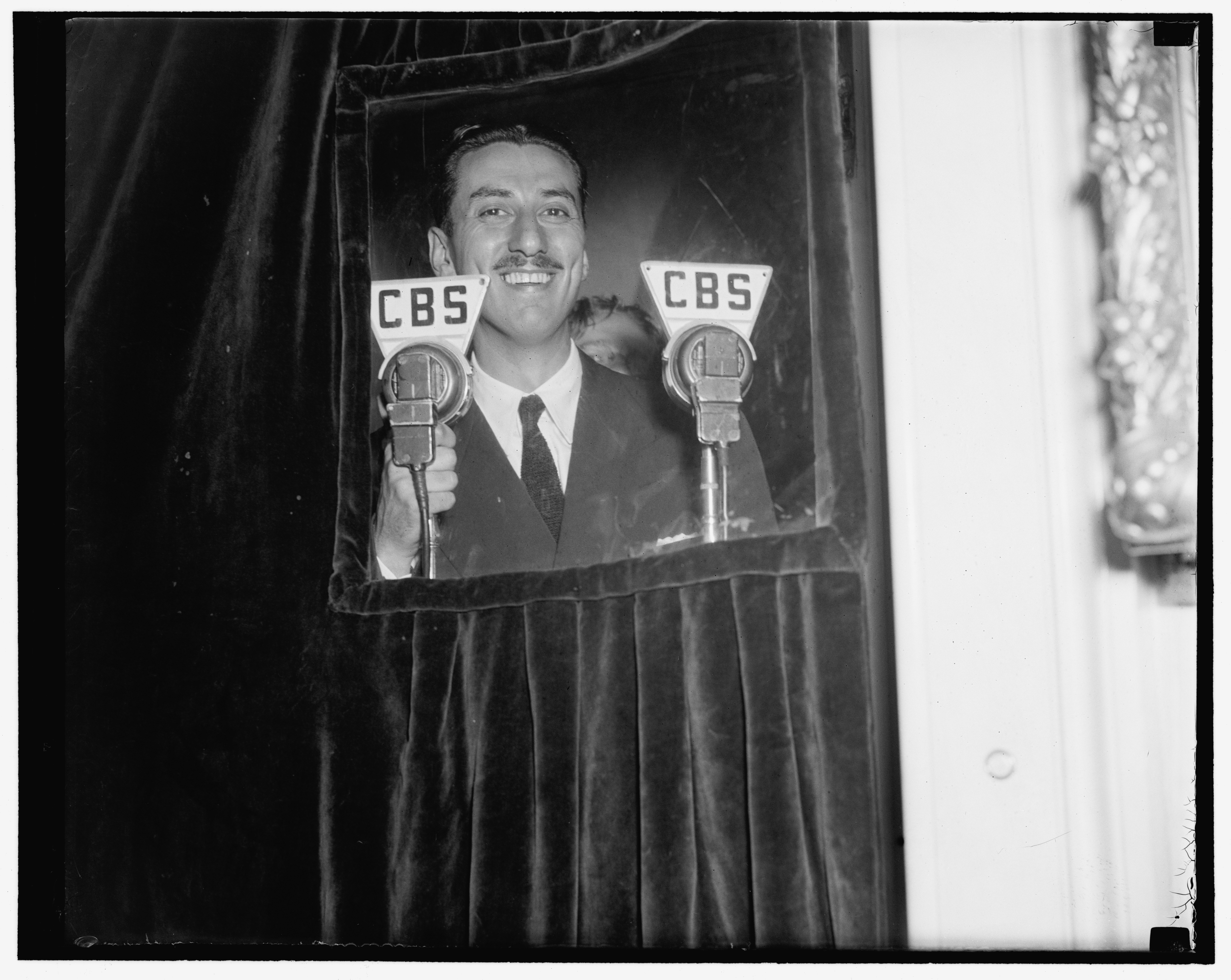
- Born: Robert Albert Blondheim; October 15, 1909; Washington, D.C., US
- Died: November 14, 2000 (aged 91); New York City, US
- Occupation: Broadcast journalist

Robert Trout (born Robert Albert Blondheim; October 15, 1909 – November 14, 2000) was an American broadcast news reporter who worked on radio before and during World War II for CBS News. He was regarded by some as the "Iron Man of Radio" for his ability to ad lib while on the air, as well as for his stamina, composure, and elocution.

== Early broadcast career ==
Trout was born in Washington, D.C. where he graduated from Central High School. He added the Trout name early in his radio career. He entered broadcasting in 1931 as an announcer at WJSV, an independent station in Alexandria, Virginia. In the summer of 1932 WJSV was acquired by CBS, bringing Trout into the CBS fold. (WJSV is now WFED in Washington, D.C.) He was the man who first used the on-air label "fireside chat" in reference to radio broadcasts of President Franklin D. Roosevelt during the Great Depression and World War II. (Trout credited the genesis of the phrase to Harry Butcher, a CBS vice president in Washington).

Trout was behind the microphone for many of broadcasting's firsts. He was the first to report on live congressional hearings from Capitol Hill, first to transmit from a flying airplane and, by some definitions, the first to broadcast a daily news program, creating the news anchorman role.

It was Bob Trout in the mid-1930s who passed on to a then-new CBS executive, Edward R. Murrow, the value of addressing the radio audience intimately, as if the announcer was talking to one person. Trout played a key role in Murrow's development as a broadcaster, and the two would remain colleagues until Murrow departed the network in 1961, and friends until Murrow's death in 1965.

On Sunday night, March 13, 1938, after Adolf Hitler's Germany had annexed Austria in the Anschluss, Trout hosted a shortwave "roundup" of reaction from multiple cities in Europe—the first such multi-point live broadcast on network radio. The broadcast included reports from correspondent William L. Shirer in London (on the annexation, which he had witnessed firsthand in Vienna) and Murrow, who filled in for Shirer in Vienna so that Shirer could report without Austrian censorship.

The special gave Trout the distinction of being one of broadcasting's first true "anchormen" (in the sense of handing off the air to someone else as if it were a baton). It became the inspiration for the CBS World News Roundup, a forerunner of television's CBS Evening News, which began later in 1938 and to this day continues to air each weekday morning and evening on the CBS Radio Network.

Trout emceed not only news and special events but also occasional entertainment programs during his first tenure at CBS, from 1932 to 1948, including a stint in London while Murrow was back in the United States. He was the announcer on CBS' The American School of the Air and on Professor Quiz, radio's first true quiz program.

Trout anchored the network's live early morning coverage of the June 6, 1944, Normandy invasion on D-Day by the allied forces and was behind the microphone when the bulletins announcing the end of World War II in Europe, and later Japan, came over the air.

== Postwar career ==
Beginning April 1, 1946, Trout anchored a daily 15-minute CBS radio newscast, The News 'til Now, sponsored by Campbell's Soup. His year-and-a-half tenure on the program ended in September 1947, when Murrow—who had been CBS's vice president for public affairs—returned to on-air work and took over the broadcast. Trout left CBS for NBC, where from 1948 to 1951 he was the first emcee of the game show, Who Said That?, in which celebrities try to determine the speaker of quotations taken from recent news reports.

Trout returned to CBS in 1952. He doubled as a network correspondent and as main anchor of local evening news at CBS' New York City television flagship, WCBS-TV until June 17, 1965.

When the July 1964 CBS Television coverage of the Republican National Convention in San Francisco (anchored by Walter Cronkite) was trounced in the ratings by NBC's Chet Huntley and David Brinkley, CBS replaced Cronkite with Bob Trout and Roger Mudd for the Democratic party's August gathering in Atlantic City. The duo failed to overtake Huntley and Brinkley, and Cronkite was back at the TV anchor desk when the conventions rolled around again four years later in Miami and Chicago. Trout remained on radio but also did in-depth news features for the TV network, including field reports for the CBS News broadcast 60 Minutes.

One overlooked aspect of Trout's career was his annual appearance on bandleader Guy Lombardo's New Year's Eve specials on CBS-TV. From 1955 through 1961, Trout would report from Times Square during the broadcast, and count down the final seconds to midnight (Eastern Standard Time) for the start of the new year.

On the day President John F. Kennedy was assassinated, November 22, 1963, Trout took to the streets of Manhattan and spoke on camera with New Yorkers and tourists seeking comments and reactions to the tragic events. As a member of the news team covering the live events of that day, Trout reflected on the sudden death of President Franklin Roosevelt eighteen years earlier in 1945, which he also reported in a CBS broadcast.

Trout remained at CBS through the early 1970s. He later worked for ABC, serving mostly as a correspondent based in Madrid, where he lived for most of the last two decades of his life. He was on the ABC News team that covered the election of Pope John Paul II in 1978.

In 1979, Trout received a Peabody Award for his distinguished broadcasting career.

Near the end of his life, he broadcast commentaries and essays for the program All Things Considered on National Public Radio. Some of them were reminiscences of 20th century events he covered, accompanied by recordings. Trout also continued to attend political conventions, earning him the distinction of having interviewed every U.S. President from Franklin D. Roosevelt to Bill Clinton. In 2000, he joined his old colleague Roger Mudd for a History Channel look at the quadrennial gatherings.

== Trout announces end of WWII ==
While reminiscing on NPR on July 9, 1999, Trout admitted that an oft-played recording of his announcing the end of World War II — "my greatest hit, as it were" — broadcast at 7 p.m. in New York City on August 14, 1945, was actually a recreation. In 1948, he was asked to re-record the opening portion of his historic broadcast announcing Japan's surrender so that a "cleaned-up" version of that announcement could be included in the first volume of Ed Murrow and Fred Friendly's "I Can Hear It Now" historical record album series. The disc recording of the original broadcast was deemed "too messy to use."

Trout played for his NPR listeners the original recording of what actually was heard on CBS Radio at that moment: his live introduction of a surrender announcement by British Prime Minister Clement Attlee—followed, not by Attlee, but by the Big Ben chimes. Then the network switched back to New York, where Trout was standing near the teletypes outside CBS Radio's Studio Nine, and listeners heard CBS news director Paul White (listening on a phone line to the White House) inform Trout that the Administration itself announced the surrender. This allowed Trout to announce the news a few seconds before Attlee made the announcement in his radio speech. Trout's broadcast is also believed to be the first broadcast news report confirming that the surrender was official, beating ABC Radio, the Mutual Broadcasting System, and NBC Radio by a few seconds.

Trout then intoned:

The Japanese have accepted our terms fully! That is the word we have just received (newsroom cheers) from the White House in Washington and (Trout chuckles) I didn't expect to hear a celebration here in our newsroom in New York, but you can hear one going on behind me. We switched to London, I don't know what happened, I'm not even sure whether you heard the first words of Prime Minister Attlee or not. I couldn't hear anything in our speaker here, with the confusion. Suddenly we got the word from our private telephone wire from the White House in Washington. The Japanese have accepted FULLY the surrender terms of the United Nations. THIS, ladies and gentlemen, is the end of the Second World War! It is not, of course, the official V-J day, but the United Nations, on land, on sea, on air, to the four corners of the earth and the seven seas, are united and are victorious!

== Personal life ==
For the last twenty years of his life, Trout and his wife lived in Madrid and New York City, where they kept a West Side apartment. He died at age 91 on November 14, 2000, in the Lenox Hill Hospital in Manhattan. His wife, the former Catherine "Kit" Crane, whom he married in 1938, had died in 1994. They had no children.

Kit was "a significant partner in his career, serving as his personal manager, providing him with research for his broadcasts, and critiquing his on-air performances"; together, they maintained a large, systematically organized collection of his papers, correspondence, press clippings, photographs, and recordings, which was bequeathed to the Dolph Briscoe Center for American History at the University of Texas at Austin.
