= List of war correspondents =

Notable war correspondents include:

== 19th century ==
- Archibald Forbes
- Benjamin C. Truman
- Bennet Burleigh (1840–1914), Sudan (Omdurman), Boer War, Russo-Japanese War, Italo-Turkish war
- Charles Frederick Williams, British journalist.
- Leo Tolstoy, Crimean War 1854-1855. A Russian of high class, he was an enlisted officer in the Caucasus, where he had gone arguably to escape his gambling, and the debts he had accrued. At the age of 26, he went to the site of the siege of Sevastopol, during the Crimean War, 1854. He wrote despatches there for the St Petersburg literary journal/newspaper The Contemporary. His essays based on his observances of boredom, rubbish dumping, meaningless suffering and disorder provided the basis for three publications, the Sevastopol Sketches. These were commended by the Czarina and translated into the French at her request. Tolstoy narrated the conditions, the bravery and the boredom encountered by the troops. He was frequently critical of higher officers. His skeptical essays were read by Mark Twain who travelled to Sevastopol long after the war and wrote The Innocents Abroad as a result. Tolstoy's sketches torpedoed him to fame and informed his later writings, including War and Peace.
- Ferdinando Petruccelli della Gattina, Expedition of the thousand, Second and Third Italian War of Independence, Paris Commune
- Frederic Villiers
- George Wingrove Cooke, Second Opium War, 1857–1858.
- Henry Crabb Robinson, Germany and Spain (1807–1809).
- Howard C. Hillegas, covered Boer Wars
- John F. Finerty was a war correspondent for the Chicago Times covering the Great Sioux War of 1876–1877.
- Kit Coleman (1864–1915), female war correspondent who covered the Spanish–American War for the Toronto Mail in 1898.
- Peter Finnerty, Walcheren Campaign (1809).
- Richard Harding Davis (1864–1916); covered the Spanish–American War, Second Boer War and the fighting on the Macedonian front during World War I.
- Robert Edmund Strahorn was a fighting war correspondent in The Great Sioux War of 1876–1877.
- Stephen Crane (1871–1900); covered the 1897 Greco-Turkish War, where he contracted tuberculosis.
- Thomas William Bowlby, North China Campaign (1860).
- William Hicks covered the Battle of Trafalgar for The Times (1805)
- William Howard Russell covered The Crimean War (1854–1855)
- Winston Churchill (1874–1965); covered the Siege of Malakand, the Mahdist War and the Second Boer War.

== 20th century ==
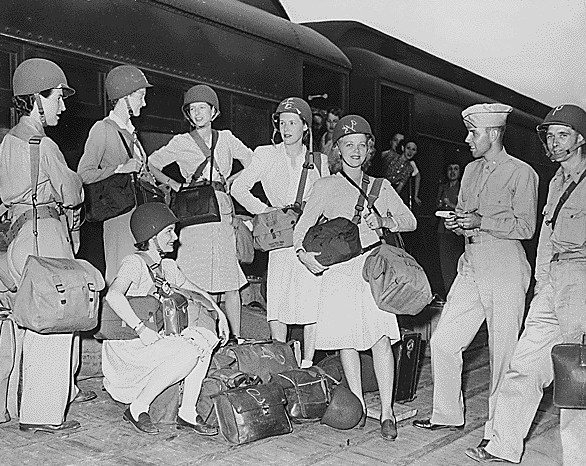
United States World War II correspondents

Some of them became authors of fiction drawing on their war experiences, including Davis, Crane and Hemingway.

- Peter Arnett (born 1934); covered the Vietnam War, 1991 Gulf War, the 2001 Invasion of Afghanistan and the 2003 Iraq War.
- Ellis Ashmead-Bartlett (1881–1931), who covered the Russo-Japanese War and World War I
- Martin Bell (born 1938), covered the Vietnam War, Biafra War, The Troubles in Northern Ireland, the Angolan Civil War and the Bosnian War
- Michael Birch (1944–1968); killed in Saigon during Tet while covering the Vietnam War
- Margaret Bourke-White (1904–1971); first American female war photojournalist, photographed Buchenwald concentration camp. Also covered the Korean War.
- Alexandra Boulat (1962–2007)
- Lothar-Günther Buchheim (1918–2007); Sonderführer in a propaganda unit of the Kriegsmarine, covering Kriegsmarine patrols during the World War II, most notably the famous U-96 seventh patrol in the Battle of the Atlantic which was eventually taken as basis for the Oscar nominated movie and mini-series Das Boot ("The Boat").
- Wilfred Burchett (1911–1983), covered the Pacific War, Korean War and Vietnam War
- Larry Burrows (1927–1971), British photojournalist famous for his work in the Vietnam War. Killed in a helicopter crash in Laos with three colleagues.
- Robert Capa (1913–1954); covered the Spanish Civil War, Second Sino-Japanese War, the European Theatre of World War II and the First Indochina War (where he was killed by a landmine).
- Peter Cave (born 1952); covered the Gulf War, Yugoslav Wars, the Coconut War in the New Hebrides, Iraq War, Tiananmen Square in Beijing, Lebanon, Egypt and Libya
- Dickey Chapelle (1918–1965); covered the Pacific War, the 1956 Hungarian Revolution and the Vietnam War (where she was killed by a landmine). She was the first female US war correspondent to be killed in action.
- Patrick Chauvel (born 1949), independent war photographer who has covered more than twenty conflicts, including the Six-Day War and the Vietnam War
- Gaston Chérau (1872–1937), French war correspondent and photographer for Le Matin during the Italo-Turkish war over Libya (1911-1912) and for L'Illustration at the beginning of World War I (1914-1915)
- Marie Colvin (1956–2012), killed while covering the siege of Homs, Syria
- Anderson Cooper (born 1967), war correspondent for CNN who covered Somalia, Bosnia, and Rwanda
- Burton Crane (1901–1963), covered occupied Japan after World War II and the Korean War for The New York Times
- Neil Davis (1934–1985), Australian combat cameraman who covered the Vietnam War, Cambodia and Laos and subsequently conflicts in Africa. He was killed in 1985 in Thailand while filming a coup attempt.
- Luc Delahaye (born 1962), French war photographer
- Bill Downs (1914–1978), one of the "Murrow Boys" who covered the Eastern Front, the Normandy landings, and later covered the Korean War
- David Douglas Duncan (1916–2018), American photojournalist, combat photographer in World War II. Also covered the Korean War and other conflicts.
- Simon Dring (1945–2021, British correspondent for Reuters, London Daily Telegraph and BBC-TV News who covered wars/revolutions in Laos, Vietnam, Cambodia, Biafra, Cyprus, Angola, Eritrea, India-Pakistan, Bangladesh, Iran, Bosnia, Middle East
- Gloria Emerson (1929–2004), covered the Vietnam War for The New York Times in 1970–72 and wrote the book Winners and Losers which won the National Book Award
- Horst Faas (1933–2012), Associated Press Saigon photographer, two Pulitzer Prizes, co-author of Lost Over Laos, Requiem, Henri Huet. Covered the Congo War, Algeria, Vietnam, Bangladesh.
- Georgie Anne Geyer (born 1935), covered the Guatemalan Civil War and the Algerian Civil War
- Bernard B. Fall (1926–1967), covered the First Indochina War and the Vietnam War (where he was killed by a landmine)
- Oriana Fallaci (1929–2006), Italian journalist, author and partisan. Covered the Vietnam War, Indo-Pakistani War, Middle East, and in South America.
- Sylvana Foa (born 1945), American correspondent in Vietnam and Cambodia
- Joseph L. Galloway (born 1941), UPI correspondent in Vietnam and co-author of We Were Soldiers Once...and Young
- Martha Gellhorn (1908–1998), covered the Spanish Civil War, World War II, Vietnam War, the Six-Day War, and the U.S. invasion of Panama
- Chas Gerretsen (born 1943), covered the war in Vietnam, Cambodia and Laos and received the Robert Capa Gold Medal Award for his coverage of the 1973 Chilean coup d'état
- Robert Goralski (1928–1988), NBC News correspondent. Covered the Vietnam War and provided witness testimony in the My Lai massacre trials.
- Al Gore (born 1948), covered the Vietnam War
- Henry Tilton Gorrell (1911–1958), United Press correspondent. Covered the Spanish Civil War and World War II. Author of Soldier of the Press, Covering the Front in Europe and North Africa, 1936–1943 in 2009.
- Cork Graham (born 1964), combat photographer, imprisoned in Vietnam for illegally entering the country while looking for Captain Kidd's buried treasure
- Philip Jones Griffiths (1936–2008), British photojournalist who covered the Vietnam War
- Louis Grondijs (1878–1961), covered the Russo-Japanese War, World War I, the Russian Civil War, the Japanese invasion of Manchuria and the Spanish Civil War.
- David Halberstam (1934–2007), American journalist, The New York Times. Covered the war in the Congo and the Vietnam War for which he won the Pulitzer Prize.
- Macdonald Hastings (1909–1982), English war correspondent for Picture Post
- Max Hastings (born 1945), British journalist who accompanied the British Task Force entering Port Stanley on the last day of the 1982 Falklands War
- Ron Haviv (born 1965), American photojournalist
- Chris Hedges (born 1956), freelance war correspondent in Central America for The Christian Science Monitor, NPR, and The Dallas Morning News
- Ernest Hemingway (1899–1961), covered the 1922 Catastrophe of Smyrna in Turkey, the Spanish Civil War and World War II
- Michael Herr (1940–2016), American writer for Esquire in the Vietnam War (1967–68)
- Marguerite Higgins (1920–1966), American reporter and war correspondent who covered World War II, the Korean War, and the Vietnam War, and paved the way for female war correspondents.
- Clare Hollingworth, covered World War II, the Algerian War, the Vietnam War and the Bangladesh Liberation War (1971)
- Johannes-Matthias Hönscheid, German correspondent who was awarded the Knight's Cross of the Iron Cross
- Peggy Hull (1889–1967), covered World War I and World War II
- Tim Judah (born 1962), covered El Salvador, the Romanian Revolution, Yugoslavia, Croatia, Bosnia, Kosovo, Afghanistan, Darfur, Iraq, Ukraine
- Clair Kenamore, St. Louis Post-Dispatch, correspondent who accompanied with General Pershing's expeditionary force into Mexico searching for Pancho Villa, later covered World War I
- Joseph Kessel (1898–1979), French journalist and novelist
- Gary Knight (born 1964), British photojournalist who covered conflicts in Yugoslavia and Iraq and the Afghanistan war
- Carmen Lasorella (born 1955), Italian journalist, covered the conflicts in the Horn of Africa in the early 1990s. She survived an ambuscade in Mogadishu, while her guards and her associate Marcello Palmisano died in the shooting.
- Catherine Leroy (1945–2006), French freelance photographer, covered the Vietnam War
- Jean Leune (1889–1944), and Hélène Vitivilia Leune (?–1940), French war correspondents who as a married couple covered the First Balkan War in Greece 1912–1913.
- Jacques Leslie, Cambodian–Vietnamese War correspondent for the Los Angeles Times (1972–1973, 1975). Leslie was the first American journalist to enter and return from Viet Cong (National Liberation Front) territory in South Vietnam, in January 1973.
- George Lewis (NBC News), covered the Vietnam War (1970–1973)
- Jack London (1876–1916), who covered the Russo-Japanese War in early 1904 for the San Francisco Examiner
- Jim G. Lucas, Scripps-Howard Newspapers, reported human interest stories from the front lines in World War II, Korea and Vietnam.
- Aernout van Lynden (born 1954), Dutch-British journalist who covered the Middle East, Northern Ireland and the Balkans
- Don McCullin (born 1935), British photojournalist who covered conflicts in Northern Ireland, Vietnam and Biafra
- Steve McCurry (born 1950), American photographer who covered the Cambodian Civil War, Afghanistan, Pakistan, Lebanon and the Gulf War. Member of Magnum Photos.
- Jim McGlincy (1917–1988), United Press correspondent who covered World War II in London and the postwar conflict in French Indochina
- Waldemar Milewicz (1956–2004), Polish war correspondent in various countries
- Christopher Morris (born 1964), British broadcast journalist who covered the Sri Lanka civil war
- James Nachtwey (born 1948), American photographer. Covered Northern Ireland, South Africa, Iraq, Sudan, Indonesia, India, Rwanda, Chechnya, Pakistan, Kosovo, Bosnia, Romania, Afghanistan, Israel.
- Frank Palmos (born 1940), Vietnam War (1965–1968), Indonesian Civil War (1965–66)
- Robert Pierpoint (1925–2011), American journalist who covered the Korean War
- John Pilger (1939–2023), Australian war correspondent in Vietnam, Cambodia, Bangladesh and Biafra
- Roy Pinney (1911–2010), covered World War II and was present at the Normandy landing on D-Day for the Normandy Invasion. He also covered the Yom Kippur War in the Gaza Strip and conflicts in Afghanistan, the Philippines, South Africa and Colombia.
- Anna Politkovskaya (1958–2006), Russian investigative journalist who covered the Second Chechen War
- George Polk (1913–1948), murdered while covering the Greek Civil War
- Dan Rather, who covered the Vietnam War for CBS News for several months in 1966–67
- John Reed (1887–1920); covered the Mexican Revolution, World War I, and the Russian Revolution, author of Ten Days that Shook the World
- John Rich (1917–2014), American journalist who covered World War II, the Korean War, and the Vietnam War for NBC News
- Inez Robb (1900–1979), who covered World War II
- Derek Round (1935–2012), who covered the Vietnam War
- Joe Sacco, comics artist who covered the Gulf War and Bosnian War
- Morley Safer (1931–2016), Canadian-American journalist who covered the Vietnam War for CBS News in 1965 and made the documentary film Morley Safer's Vietnam
- Sydney Schanberg (1934–2016), American journalist whose experiences in Cambodia during the Vietnam War are dramatized in The Killing Fields
- Kurt Schork (1947–2000), American reporter and war correspondent ambushed and killed, along with his cameraman, while working for Reuters in Sierra Leone
- Peter Scholl-Latour (1922–2014), German journalist who covered conflicts in Africa and Asia, Algeria, Vietnam, Angola, Israel, Iraq, Iran, Cambodia, etc.
- Robert Sherrod (1909–1994), worked for Time and Life magazines for World War II. Also covered the Korean and Vietnam Wars.
- Vaughan Smith (born 1963), British cameraman who covered Afghanistan, Iraq, Bosnia, Chechnya, Kosova, and the Gulf War
- Karsten Thielker (born 1966), German photojournalist. Covered the Rwanda Genocide, Kosovo. Won the 1995 Pulitzer Prize.
- Ed Vulliamy (born 1954)
- Trevor Watson (born 1953), Australian Broadcasting Corporation. Covered the Soviet occupation of Afghanistan, the Cambodia conflict, Fiji's military coups, China's Tiananmen Square uprising and the attempted overthrow of Thai dictator General Suchinda Kraprayoon.
- Kate Webb (1943–2007), covered the Vietnam and Cambodian wars for UPI; captured by the North Vietnamese in Cambodia in 1971 and held for three weeks; covered the East Timor war, the Gulf War, Indonesia, Afghanistan for AFP.
- Paul Wood, BBC defense correspondent in the Middle East covering the Arab World since 2003

== 21st century ==
- Martin Adler (1958–2006), Swedish video journalist, killed in Mogadishu, Somalia. Covered the Gulf War, Liberia, Rwanda, Sierra Leone.
- Christiane Amanpour, covered the Gulf War and the Bosnian War
- Jon Lee Anderson, covered the wars in Afghanistan, Iraq, Uganda, Israel, El Salvador, Ireland, Lebanon and Iran.
- Ellison Barber, covered Ukraine-Russia War and Gaza war and armed conflicts in Venezuela and Haiti.
- Andrew Beatty, embedded for AFP during the 2011 Libyan Civil War and fired upon during the 2012 Benghazi attack
- Ben Brown, covered the Gulf War
- Mile Cărpenişan (1975–2010), covered the Iraq War and Kosovo war
- Mstyslav Chernov (Associated Press), covered the War in Donbas, Syrian civil war, and US military operations in Iraq.
- Marie Colvin (1956–2012), American UPI after Sunday Times journalist. Covering the conflict in Syria, Marie was killed in Homs. Covered conflicts in Sierra Leone, Chechnya, Sri Lanka, Libya.
- Dan Eldon (1970–1993), British photojournalist. Killed in Mogadishu, Somalia, by an angry mob while covering the Battle of Mogadishu
- Richard Engel (born 1973), American who covered the Iraq War, the 2006 Lebanon War and the Syrian civil war (during which he was kidnapped but subsequently rescued)
- Dexter Filkins (born 1961), covered wars in Iraq, Afghanistan, and Syrian
- Robert Fisk (1946–2020), British journalist, covered Northern Ireland conflict, Algerian Civil War, Beirut, Bosnia, Afghanistan, Lebanese Civil War, Iranian Revolution, Iran–Iraq War, the 1991 Persian Gulf War, Kosovo War and the 2003 Iraq War.
- Janine di Giovanni, reported wars in Bosnia, Africa, the Middle East and, more recently, Syria.
- Patrick Graham (born 1965), covered conflicts in Iraq and elsewhere
- Aziz Ullah Haidari (1968–2001), covered the Afghanistan war
- Michael Hastings (1980–2013), covered the Iraq War and the Afghanistan War
- Tim Hetherington (1970–2011), British photographer and documentary filmmaker, covered Afghanistan, Liberia and was killed in Libya.
- Chris Hondros (1970–2011), American photographer, covered conflicts in Liberia, Angola, Sierra Leone, Kosovo and was killed in Misrata, Libya, in 2011.
- Wojciech Jagielski
- Gilles Jacquier (1968–2012), French cameraman for France 2 Television. He was the first reporter killed in the Syrian civil war.
- Sebastian Junger, American journalist and documentary filmmaker, covered conflicts in Bosnia and Afghanistan
- Ryszard Kapuściński
- Joseph Kessel
- Rick Leventhal (born 1960), covered the wars in Kosovo, Afghanistan, Iraq and Libya
- Terry Lloyd (1952–2003), British television journalist, covered the Middle East. He was killed by U.S. troops while covering the 2003 invasion of Iraq for ITN.
- Anthony Loyd (born 1966), covered Bosnia and Chechnya
- Karen Maron
- Kenji Nagai (1957–2007), Japanese photographer. Covered the Afghanistan War. Kenji was killed in Yangon, Burma.
- Agnes Ndirubusa, Burundian journalist and war correspondent
- Remy Ourdan
- Iain Overton, who has written two books on conflict.
- Robert Young Pelton, best known for his 1,000+ page guide to warzones and survival, The World's Most Dangerous Places.
- Arturo Pérez-Reverte, (born 1951 in Spain) worked for Pueblo newspaper and Spanish TVE. Covered the Bosnian War among others.
- Alberto Peláez (born 1964 in Madrid) as war journalist, writer and correspondent, worked as chief correspondent of the news of Televisa in Spain.
- Carlos Loret de Mola (born in 1976 in Yucatán, Mexico) has participated in numerous international news assignments, such as the Libyan Civil War, the Egyptian Revolution, War in Afghanistan, and the Israeli-Palestinian conflict.
- Paul Ronzheimer (born 1985), German war correspondent and journalist
- Nir Rosen, covered the Iraq War and the War in Afghanistan
- İrfan Sapmaz (born 1962), Turkish senior war correspondent. Covered the Soviet–Afghan War from 1987 for six years onwards, as well as the Gulf Wars and more-recent conflicts in the Middle East for CNN Türk.
- Giuliana Sgrena
- Anthony Shadid (1968-2012), covered the Iraq war, Arab spring. Pulitzer Prize for International Reporting 2004 and 2009.
- Heba Shibani
- John Simpson
- Kevin Sites
- Daniel Wakefield Smith
- Michael Ware (born 1969); ongoing coverage of the invasion and occupation of Iraq. Reporting from the perspectives of all combatant groups.
- Olivier Weber covered the Iraq War, the War in Afghanistan, in Israel, Iran, Eritrea, Algeria, Pakistan and a dozen other conflicts.
- Mika Yamamoto (1967–2012) Japanese photographer and TV journalist. Killed on August 20, 2012, in Aleppo, while covering the Syrian civil war
- Isobel Yeung Covered conflicts in Yemen, Syria, Philippines.
- Michael Yon (born 1964); former Green Beret, turned journalist and author. Embedded with American, British and Lithuanian combat units in Iraq War
- Hollie McKay (born 1985) covered conflicts in Iraq, Afghanistan, Syria, Yemen, Myanmar, and Ukraine.
