= Safety of journalists =

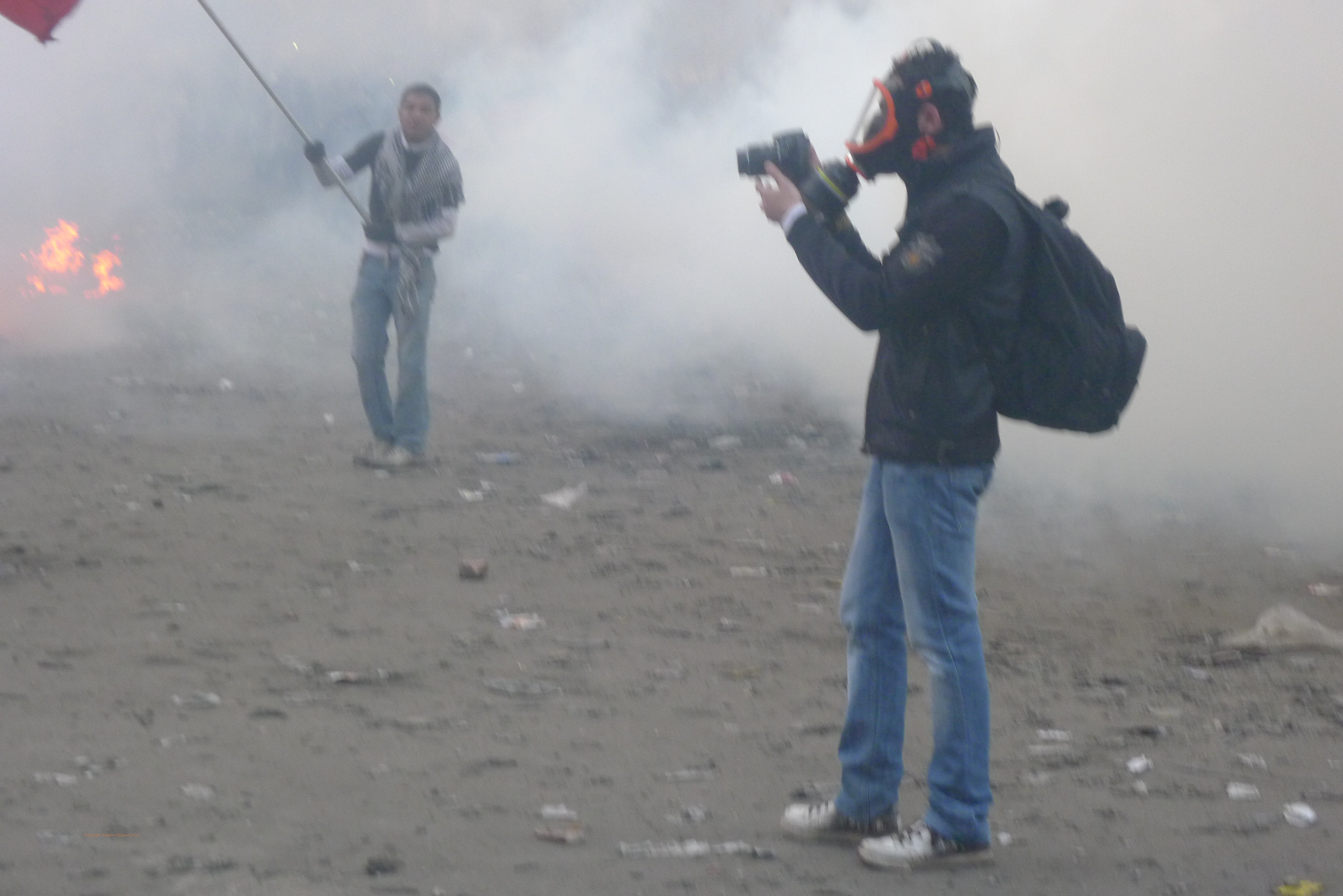
Journalist wearing a gas mask on Mansour Street of Cairo, Egypt in 2012

Safety of journalists is the ability of journalists and media professionals to receive, produce and share information without facing physical or moral threats.

Journalists can face violence and intimidation for exercising their fundamental right to freedom of expression. The range of threats they are confronted with include murder, kidnapping, hostage-taking, offline and online harassment, intimidation, enforced disappearances, arbitrary detention and torture. Women journalists also face specific dangers and are specially vulnerable to sexual assault, whether in the form of a targeted sexual violation, often in reprisal for their work; mob-related sexual violence aimed against journalists covering public events; or the sexual abuse of journalists in detention or captivity. Many of these crimes are not reported as a result of powerful cultural and professional stigmas."

Increasingly, journalists, and particularly women journalists, are facing abuse and harassment online, such as hate speech, cyber-bullying, cyber-stalking, doxing, trolling, public shaming, intimidation and threats.

== Violence against journalists ==
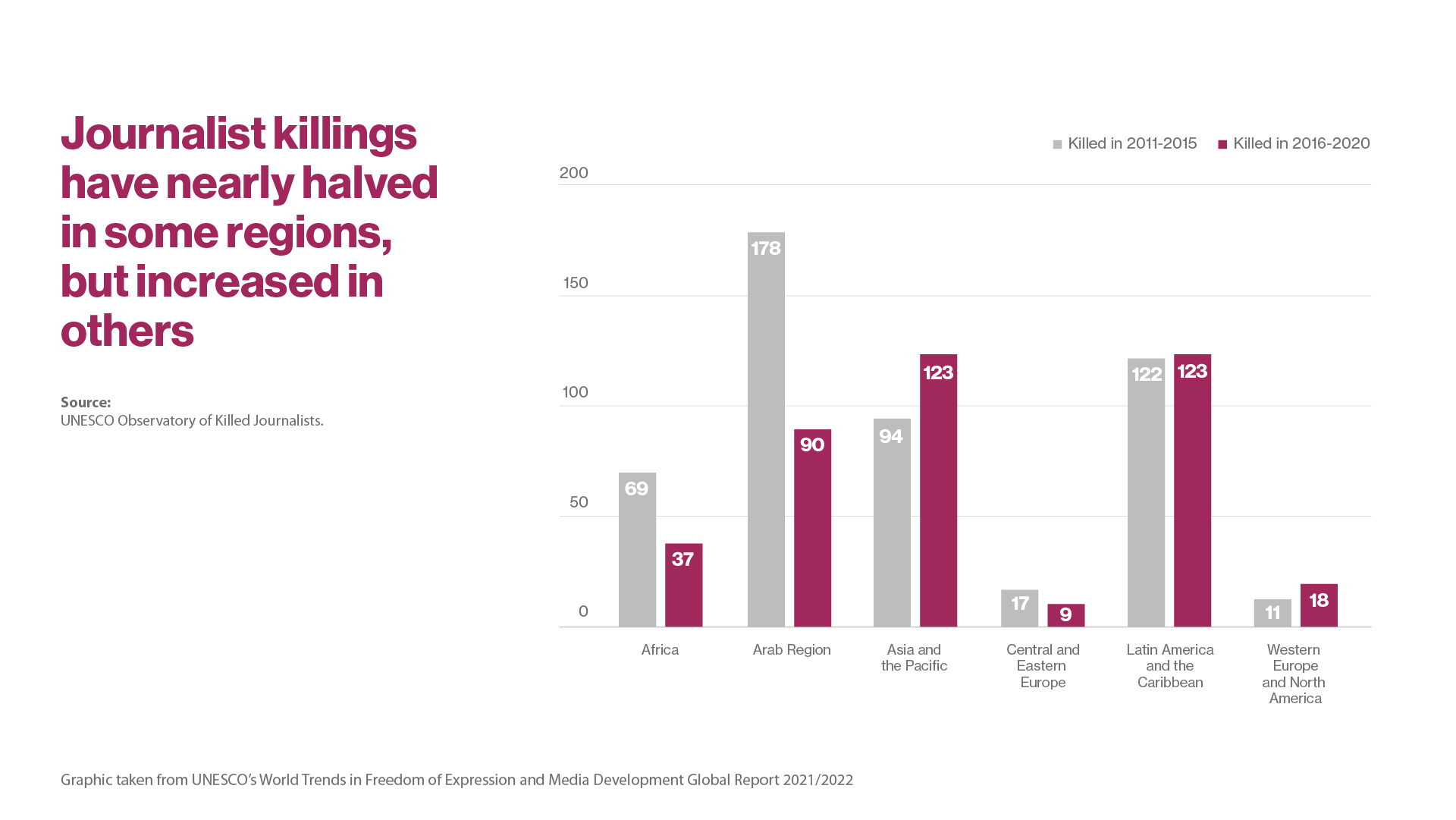
Journalism is a public good: World Trends in freedom of expression and media development; global report 2021/2022, UNESCO, https://unesdoc.unesco.org/ark:/48223/pf0000380618.locale=fr

From 2016 to 2020, UNESCO Director-General Audrey Azoulay condemned the deaths of 400 journalists. A downward trend is observed compared to the period from 2012 to 2016, when the Director-General of UNESCO condemned the death of 530 journalists, which is equivalent to an average of two deaths per week. In 2021, 55 killings of journalists were recorded, this is the lowest number recorded by the Director-General of UNESCO in 14 years. In 2020, most of the murders committed against journalists took place in a context other than that of an armed conflict, representing 61% of the murders of journalists of the year. The opposite trend was observed for the year 2016, where 50% of killings took place in countries experiencing armed conflict.

According to the Committee to Protect Journalists (CPJ), nearly 50 per cent of those whose death was confirmed to be related to their work as journalist were murdered, while 36 per cent were caught in the crossfire and 14% killed while on dangerous assignment. According to the NGO, political groups were the most likely source of violence (36%) in these killings, followed by military officials (22%) and unknown sources (20%).

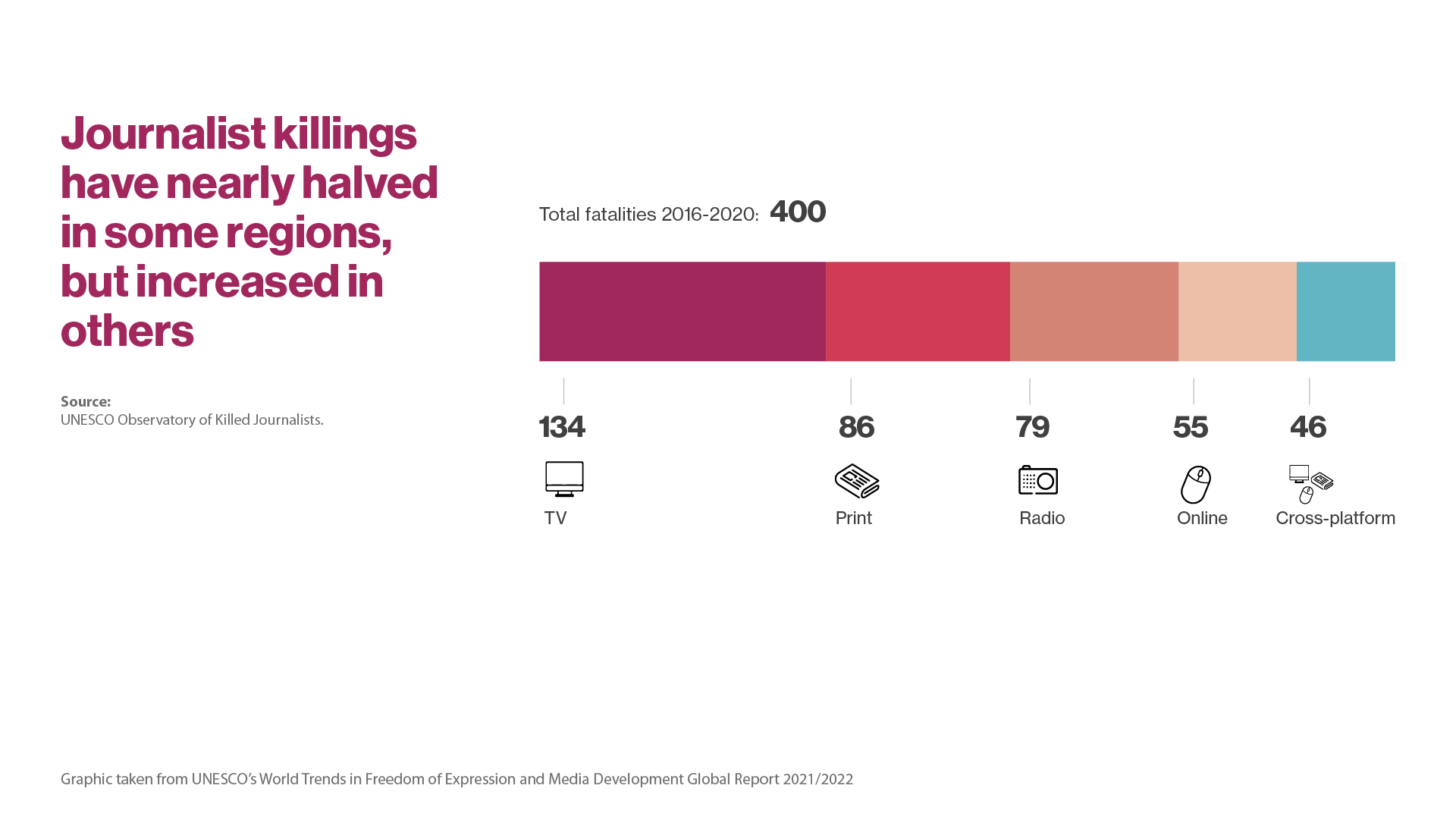
Type of media of journalists killed, 2016–2020 World Trends in Freedom of Expression and Media Development (2022)

The UNESCO's study World Trend Report in Freedom of Expression and media development: Global Report 2017/2018, has found that over the past five years, 113 freelance journalists were killed, representing 21% of the total of the journalist killed. It has been considered that freelance journalists are particularly vulnerable, often working alone on stories, in dangerous environments, and without the same level of assistance and protection as staff-journalists. The past few years, the trend has been confirmed, in fact the Report of the Organization's Director-General on the safety of journalists and the dangers of impunity of 2022 has found that for the period 2020–2021, around 1/5 of all journalist killings were freelance journalists. The study establishes that 11 freelance journalist killings were recorded in 2020, representing 18% of all killings and 11 in 2021 representing 20% of the killings.

From 2016 to 2020, television journalists have been by far the most attacked group among journalists, accounting for 134 journalist fatalities, or 34%, in the past five years. Indeed, the journalists covering conflict were considered particularly vulnerable and at high risk of being either killed in crossfire or directly targeted, they have been followed by journalists working mainly for print (86), radio (79), online (55) and those working cross platforms. Nonetheless, in the last report of the Director-General of the UNESCO about the safety of journalists and the danger of the impunity of 2022, a new trend has been observed: during the 2020–2021 biennium cross-platform journalists have become the most vulnerable to fatal attacks. By 2021, they constituted 41% of the total number of fatalities for that year.

=== Notable examples ===
In the late 1980s and 1990s, several journalists lost their lives in Mogadishu while covering the Somali Civil War. Almerigo Grilz, murdered in 1987, was considered the first Italian journalist to die on a battlefield since the end of the Second World War. In 1994 Ilaria Alpi and her cameraman Miran Hrovatin were killed while investigating an illegal dumping of toxic waste. A year later Carmen Lasorella and Marcello Palmisano were targeted with gunfire by Somali mercenaries. Palmisano died in the shooting, Lasorella managed to survive.

In 2018, Washington Post journalist and U.S. resident Jamal Khashoggi was ambushed, suffocated, and dismembered by agents of the Saudi government.

On May 11, 2022, Palestinian-American Al Jazeera journalist Shireen Abu Akleh was shot in the head and killed while covering a raid by the Israel Defense Forces on the Jenin refugee camp in the West Bank. Separate investigations by the Associated Press, Bellingcat, The New York Times, and the Washington Post all independently concluded that fire from an IDF unit was the most likely cause of Akleh's death. Eyewitnesses told CNN that Akleh was likely deliberately targeted by the IDF.

On October 16, 2026, Heidi Levine, an American photojournalist for the Washington Post, was attacked by Israeli settlers while covering the olive harvest in the village of Abu Falah in the occupied West Bank. According to reports, she suffered cuts in various parts of her body, a broken rib, and a deep laceration to one of her fingers in the attack. Matt Murray, executive editor of The Washington Post, also called for an investigation into the attack.

=== Terrorism and increasing risks ===
Terrorism represents a direct and growing threat for journalists, which has taken the form of kidnappings, executions threats or hacking. At the end of the 1970s, the general policy of welcoming journalists into areas of guerrillas control changed. Organizations such as the Khmer Rouge in Cambodia, the Red Brigades in Italy, the Shining Path in Peru and the Armed Islamic Group (GIA) in Algeria targeted journalists, considering them as the auxiliaries of the powers they were combating, and thus as enemies. Between 1993 and 1997, more than 100 journalists and media workers were killed in Algeria. During the Lebanese Civil War (1975–1990), kidnapping international journalists became a common tactic.

According to the Committee to Protect Journalists (CPJ), 40% of the journalists murdered in 2015 were killed by groups claiming adherence to radical Islam. International press correspondents, in particular, are considered potential hostages, or sacrificial lambs, whose execution is dramatized to serve terrorist propaganda. This happened to James Foley, Steven Sotloff (United States) and Kenji Goto (Japan), who were beheaded by Daesh.

Trauma and the emotional impact of witnessing terrorism is also an issue for journalists, as they may experience anxiety, insomnia, irritation and physical problems such as fatigue or headaches. It can also lead to post-traumatic stress disorder, which can cause incapacitating feelings of horror, fear and despair. According to the study Eyewitness Media Hub of 2015, 40% of the journalists who were interviewed admitted that viewing video testimonies had had negative effects on their personal life.

The protection of sources and surveillance is one of the major issues in the coverage of terrorism in order to protect witnesses and interviewees against reprisals.

=== Impunity for crimes against journalists ===
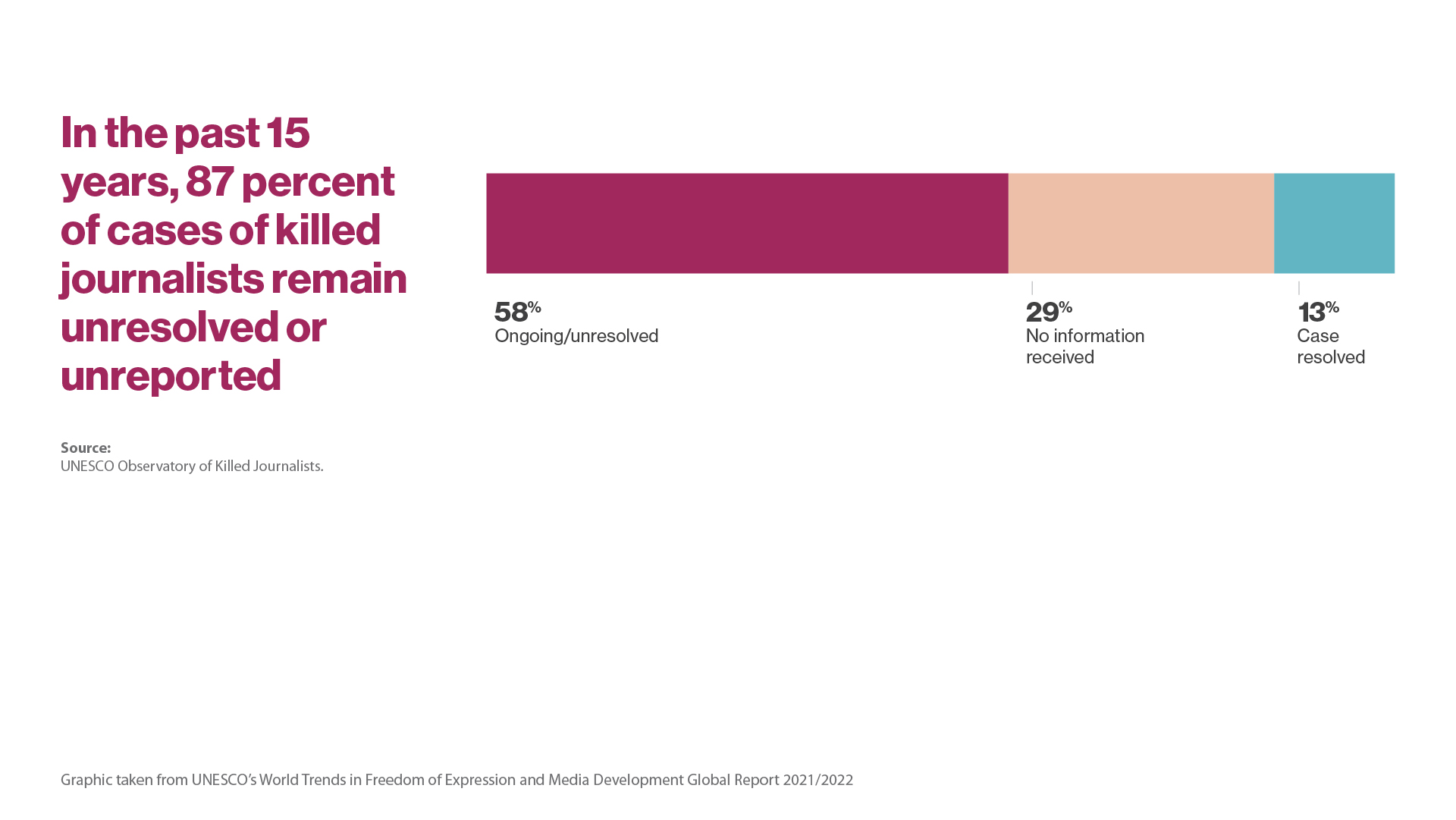
Status of judicial inquiry into killings of journalists, UNESCO's 2022 World Trends in Freedom of Expression and Media Development

There is a continuing trend of impunity for crimes against journalists, with 87% of cases of killings of journalists unresolved. The Special Rapporteur for Freedom of Expression of the Inter-American Commission on Human Rights Edison Lanza considers impunity as a key obstacle to ensuring journalists' safety. Frank La Rue, UNESCO's former Assistant Director-General for Communication and Information considers that its "root cause has to be attributed to lack of political will to pursue investigations, including for fear of reprisals from criminal networks in addition to inadequate legal frameworks, a weak judicial system, lack of resources allocated to law enforcement, negligence, and corruption".

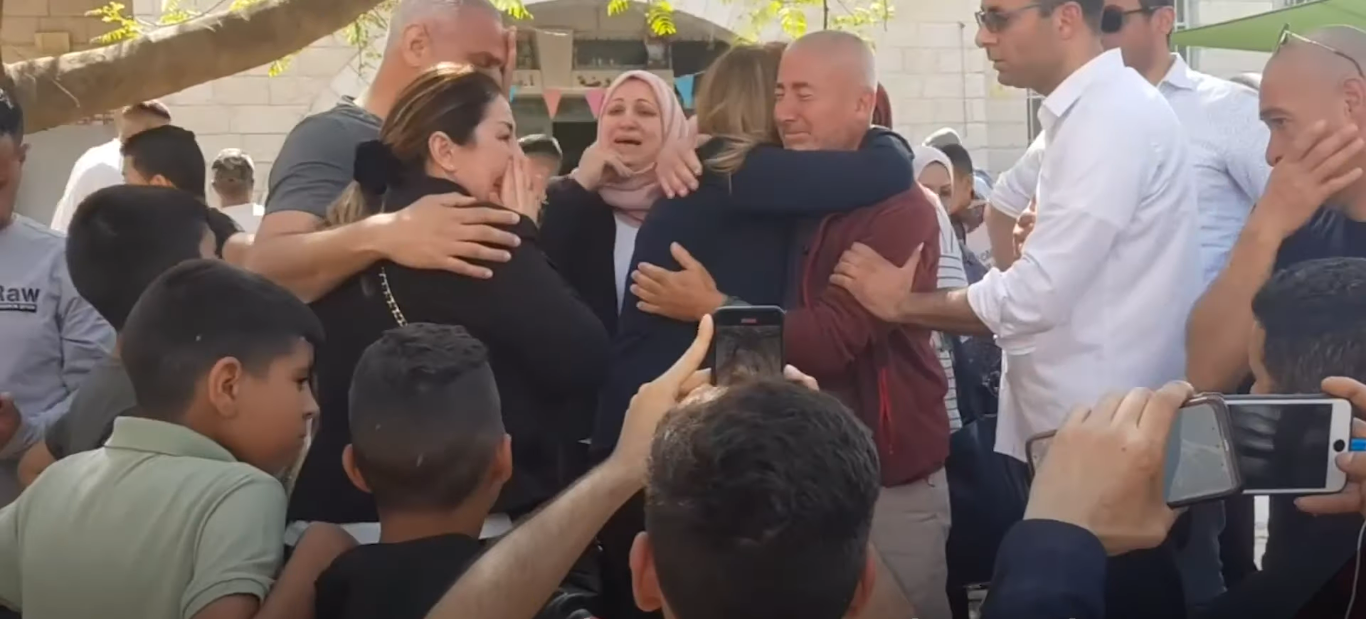
Funeral for Palestinian journalist Shireen Abu Aqleh after her death

UNESCO has set up a mechanism to monitor the status of judicial enquiries into the killings of journalists. Each year, the Director-General of the Organization sends a request to Member States in which killings of journalists have occurred asking them to inform it of the status of ongoing investigations on each killing condemned. UNESCO records the responses to these requests in a public report submitted every two years to the International Programme for the Development of Communication (IPDC) Council by the Director-General. In 2021 the Organization sent letters to 64 Member States requesting information on the status of unresolved cases that occurred between 2006 and 2020 and received some form of response from 40 of them. As of 31 December 2020, a total of 1,229 journalists had been killed since UNESCO began systematically monitoring journalist killings and impunity in 2006. Of those, 163 cases (13%) are now considered fully resolved, the same resolution rate as that recorded the previous year. Of the remaining cases, 706 are considered ongoing or unresolved, and for 360 cases, States concerned did not provided any information.

At its 68th session in 2013, the United Nations General Assembly adopted resolution A/RES/68/163 proclaiming 2 November as the International Day to End Impunity for Crimes Against Journalists. The day acts to promote understanding of the broader issues that accompany impunity and to strengthen international commitment to ensuring a safe and enabling environment for journalists.

The United Nations Plan of Action on the Safety of Journalists and the Issue of Impunity supports Member States in the implementation of proactive initiatives to address the prevailing culture of impunity, such as judicial capacity building and the strengthening of monitor and prosecution mechanisms.

In 2023, Committee to Protect Journalists published the report “Deadly Pattern,” documenting twenty-two years of Israeli forces killing journalists and evading responsibility, including claims, with unsubstantiated evidence, that the slain were not journalists.

On 16 April 2025 Israel targeted journalists, including an airstrike which killed Fatima Hassouna, prior to her film being shown at the Cannes Film Festival, the IDF claimed she was a militant. Ten members of her family died in the attack, including her pregnant sister.

== Non-lethal and physically violent attacks against journalists ==
=== Other attacks on the safe practice of journalism ===
According to data compiled by the Committee to Protect Journalists (CPJ), the imprisonment of journalists on charges relating to anti-state activities, criminal defamation, blasphemy, retaliation or on no charge at all, has continued to rise. In 2022, the CPJ reported that 363 journalists were imprisoned worldwide in a range of charges. According to the non-governmental organization this number represents a new global record "that overtakes last year's record by 20% and marks another grim milestone in a deteriorating media landscape".

RSF Secretary-General Christophe Deloire has stated that "a full-blown hostage industry has developed in certain conflict zones", with a 35 per cent increase in 2015 compared to the previous year of the number of media hostages held worldwide.

Reporters Without Borders (RSF)—which tracks the imprisonment of citizen journalists, along with professional journalists—reported that 533 journalists were detained in 2022, which represents an increase of 13,4% of the imprisonment rate compared to 2021. Never before has RSF recorded such a high number of imprisoned journalists. 2022 reportedly saw the proportion of women journalists imprisoned reach heights with an increase of 27.9% compared to 2021. During this year, four countries China (19), Iran (18), Myanmar (10) and Belarus (9) imprisoned more than 70% of the women journalists.

In March 2024 China Issued an apology after local journalists were shown being harassed and being obstructed from reporting by an incident about a gas leak. In 2023 China had 44 journalists imprisoned.

The Media Institute of Southern Africa has documented incidents of intimidation such as the torching of vehicles, physical assault and death threats. In parts of the Arab region, journalists and prominent writers have reportedly suffered death threats, been severely beaten and had travel restrictions imposed upon them. In the Asia Pacific region, the Southeast Asian Press Alliance has noted that in some insecure contexts, physical insecurity is reportedly so tenuous that some journalists have chosen to arm themselves.

Threats and actual cases of violence and imprisonment, as well as harassment, are reported to have forced a large number of local journalists into exile each year. Between 1 June 2012 and 31 May 2015, at least 272 journalists reportedly went into exile for work-related persecution worldwide.

=== Self-censorship ===
One survey conducted by PEN America of over 520 writers found that the majority reported concerns about government surveillance, which led to a reluctance to write, research or speak about certain topics. Almost a quarter of the writers had deliberately avoided certain topics in phone and email conversations, while 16 per cent had avoided writing or speaking about a certain topic and another 11 per cent had seriously considered it. A 2017 survey conducted by the Council of Europe of 940 journalists throughout 47 member states found that in the face of physical violence or coercion, 15 per cent of journalists abandon covering sensitive, critical stories, while 31 per cent tone down their coverage and 23 per cent opt to withhold information in Europe.

=== Increased risks at protests ===
Journalists are often responsible for covering protests. Some protests are peaceful while others become violent making coverage for journalist unsafe. In some instances the protests themselves are not violent. However, journalist remain targets. The U.S. Press Freedom Tracker documents 930 reported incidents of journalists involving arrests, assault or prevention since the murder of George Floyd in 2020. In the Black Lives Matter protests alone, 400 journalists were attacked and 129 were arrested. Some attacks appear targeted not by protestors, but by law enforcement. In 2020 law enforcement was responsible for 80% of attacks on journalists. With some accounts where journalists were injured by projectiles and pepper spray.

Over the past decade there has been an increased risk for journalists covering protests. According to UNESCO's observatory of killed journalists from 2020 to 2021, six journalists were killed while covering protests. In some cases journalists are targeted based on demographics including but not limited to: their identity, race, gender, and sexual orientation.

== Digital safety for journalists ==
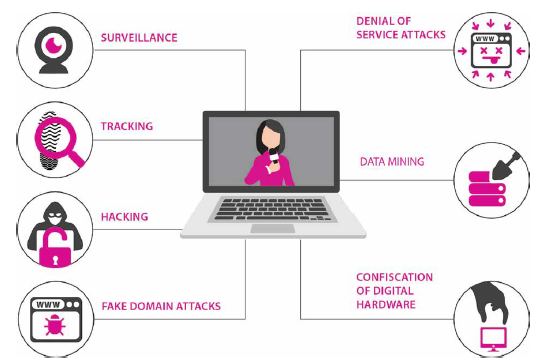
Types of threats to the digital safety of journalism

Surveillance, data storage capabilities and digital attack technologies are becoming more sophisticated, less expensive and more pervasive, making journalists increasingly vulnerable to digital attacks from both state and non-state actors.

With the widespread availability of surveillance software and hardware, in a number of states across multiple regions, broadly defined legislative acts have been seen by some as working to silence digital dissent, prosecute whistle blowers and expand arbitrary surveillance across multiple digital platforms.

=== Cyber-harassment ===
In late 2016, the International Press Institute launched the OnTheLine database, a project that aims to systematically monitor online harassment of journalists as a response to their reporting. As of July 2017, the project had collected 1,065 instances of online harassment in the two countries (Turkey and Austria) in which the project collected data. In Pakistan, the Digital Rights Foundation has launched the country's first cyber harassment helpline for journalists, which aims to provide legal advice, digital security support, psychological counselling and a referral system to victims. As of May 2017, the helpline handled a total of 563 cases since its launch six months earlier, with 63 per cent of calls received from women and 37% from men. Research undertaken by Pew Research Center indicated that 73% of adult internet users in the United States had seen someone be harassed in some way online and 40 per cent had personally experienced it, with young women being particularly vulnerable to sexual harassment and stalking.

== Gender equality and the safety of journalists ==
=== Threats on women journalists ===
Women journalists, whether they are working in an insecure context, or in a newsroom, face risks of physical assault, sexual harassment, sexual assault, rape, and even murder. Women journalists are vulnerable to attacks not only from those attempting to silence their coverage but also from sources, colleagues, and others. A 2014 global survey of nearly 1,000 journalists, initiated by the International News Safety Institute (INSI) in partnership with the International Women's Media Foundation (IWMF) and with the support of UNESCO, found that nearly two-thirds of women who took part in the survey had experienced intimidation, threats or abuse in the workplace.

In the period from 2012 through 2016, UNESCO's Director-General denounced the killing of 38 women journalists, representing 7 per cent of all journalists killed. The percentage of journalists killed who are women is significantly lower than their overall representation in the media workforce. This large gender gap is likely partly the result of the persistent under-representation of women reporting from war zones or insurgencies or on topics such as politics and crime.

The September 2017 report of the United Nations Secretary-General outlines a way forward for a gender-sensitive approach to strengthening the safety of women journalists. In 2016, the Council of Europe’s Committee of Ministers adopted recommendation CM/Rec(2016)4 on the protection of journalism and the safety of journalists and other media actors, in particular noting the gender-specific threats that many journalists face and calling for urgent, resolute and systematic responses. The same year, the IPDC council requests the UNESCO Director-General's report to include gender information.

Legal harassment is the biggest threat to female journalists, according to a report by the Coalition for Women in Journalism. So far this year, at least 72 cases of legal harassment have been reported to the CFWIJ. When the number of detentions is added, it becomes clear how the legal system can be misused to target and silence journalists, posing a serious threat to female journalists.

Another big issue is harassment, which can happen online and at work. The sexual nature of the harassment women experience is often rooted in misogyny, as evidenced by the numerous cases of rape threats and sexually explicit manipulated photos and videos that have been used to defame and disparage female journalists. The so-called "double onslaught" on female journalists is visible again: they are targeted both for their gender and their profession. For this reason, it is crucial to focus on the gendered components of the dangers to which female journalists are exposed. The harassment women journalists face, whether online or offline, threatens their right to freedom of expression and limits the diversity of opinion in the media.

=== Online harassment of women journalists ===
Research by Pew Research Center indicated that 73 per cent of adult internet users in the United States had seen someone be harassed in some way online and 40 per cent had personally experienced harassment, with young women being particularly vulnerable to sexual harassment and stalking.

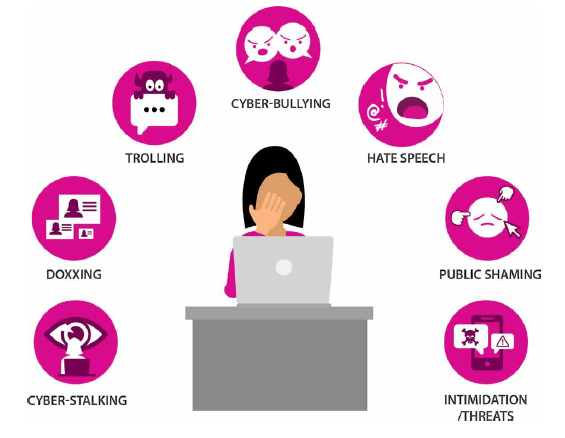
Online harassment of women journalists, World Trends Report 2018

An analysis of more than two million Tweets performed by the think tank Demos found that women journalists experienced approximately three times as many abusive comments as their male counterparts on Twitter.

The Guardian surveyed the 70 million comments recorded on its website between 1999 and 2016 (only 22,000 of which were recorded before 2006). Of these comments, approximately 1.4 million (approximately two per cent) were blocked for abusive or disruptive behavior. Of the 10 staff journalists who received the highest levels of abuse and ‘dismissive trolling’, eight were women.

The INSI and IWMF survey found that more than 25 per cent of ‘verbal, written and/or physical intimidation including threats to family and friends’ took place online.

Countering online abuse is a significant challenge, and few legislative and policy frameworks exist on the international or national level to protect journalists from digital harassment.

The International Federation of Journalists and the South Asia Media Solidarity Network launched the Byte Back campaign to raise awareness and combat online harassment of women journalists in the Asia-Pacific region.

The Organization for Security and Cooperation in Europe (OSCE) organized an expert meeting titled ‘New Challenges to Freedom of Expression: Countering Online Abuse of Female Journalists’ which produced a publication of the same title that includes the voices of journalists and academics on the realities of online abuse of women journalists and how it can be combated.

== Actions taken to enhance the safety of journalists ==
=== International organizations ===
The United Nations Sustainable Development Goals

==== International instruments ====
International legal instruments are among the key tools that can support the creation of an enabling environment for the safety of journalists. These include the Universal Declaration of Human Rights; the Geneva Conventions; the International Covenant on Civil and Political Rights; the United Nations Commission on Human Rights Resolution 2005/81; and the United Nations Security Council Resolution 1738 (2006).

==== United Nations ====
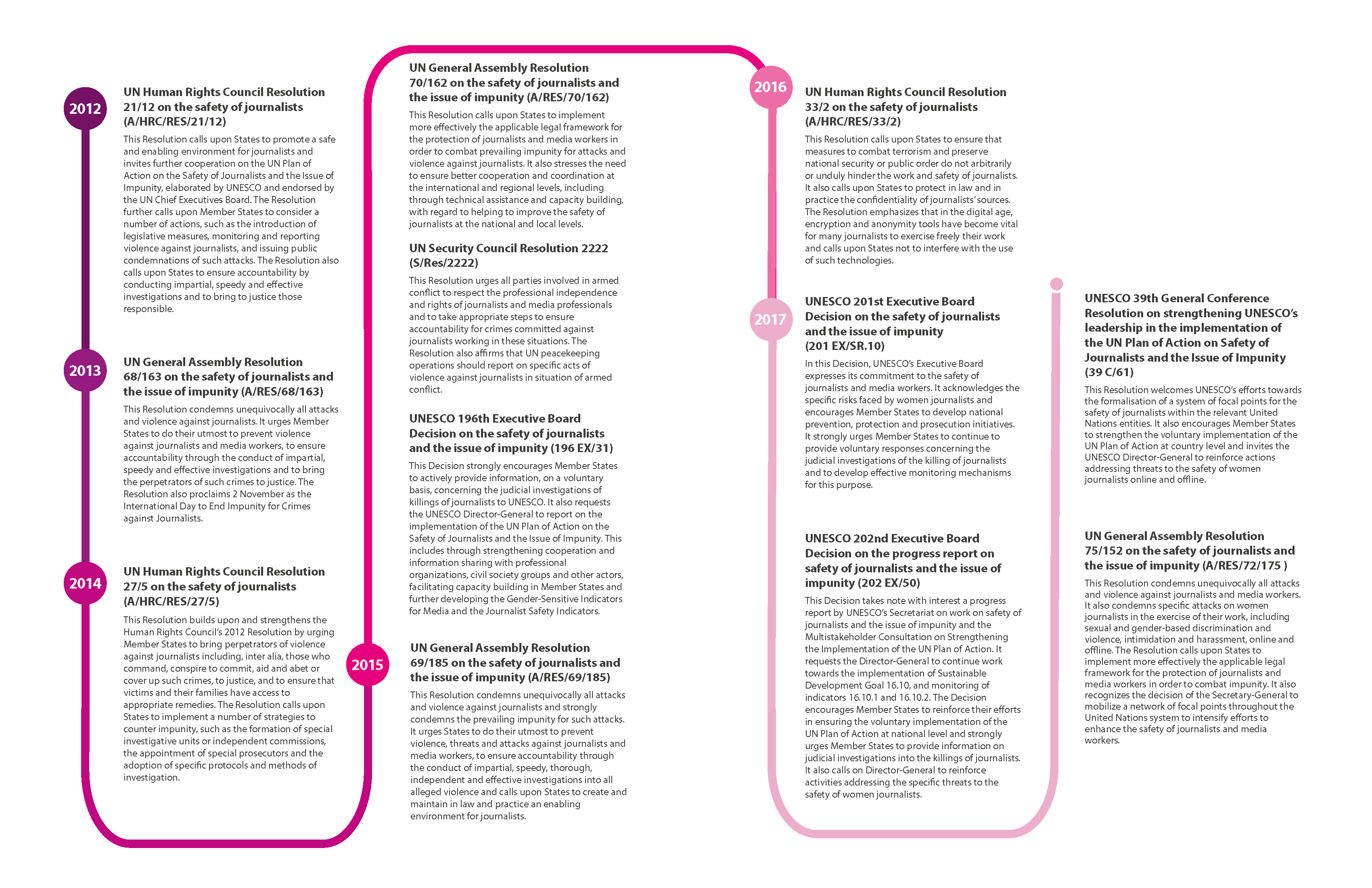
UN resolutions on the safety of journalists adopted since 2012, UNESCO's World Trends Report

The safety of journalists and their role in promoting inclusive and sustainable societies has been recognized by the United Nations in the 2030 Agenda for Sustainable Development. Goal 16 outlines the promotion of peaceful and inclusive societies for sustainable development, provide access to justice for all and build effective and inclusive institutions at all levels.

Since 2012, there have been a total of 12 UN resolutions on the safety of journalists adopted by several UN organs.

In December 2015, Resolution A/70/125 of the General Assembly recognized serious threats to freedom of expression in the context of reviewing progress since the 2005 World Summit on the Information Society (WSIS). The Resolution called for the protection of journalists and media workers.

The United Nations Secretary General also produces reports on the safety of journalists and the issue of impunity (in 2014 A/69/268, 2015 A/HRC/30/68 respectively, 2017 A/72/290).

SDG 16.10.1 relates to the number of verified cases of killings, kidnapping, enforced disappearance, arbitrary detention and torture of journalists, associated media personnel, trade unionists and human rights defenders. The indicator was decided upon by the United Nations Statistical Commission for tracking progress in the achievement of target 10.

==== The UN Plan of Action on the Safety of Journalists ====
The United Nations (UN) Plan of Action, coordinated by UNESCO, was elaborated to provide a comprehensive, coherent, and action-oriented UN-wide approach to the safety of journalists and the issue of impunity. Since its launch, it has become a guiding framework for activities in this area. Following its endorsement by the UN System Chief Executives Board for Coordination in 2012, the UN Plan of Action has been welcomed by the UN General Assembly, UNESCO and the Human Rights Council. Outside of the UN, it has been referred to by various regional bodies, and it has given impetus to and fostered a spirit of cooperation between the UN and various stakeholders in many countries.

==== UNESCO ====
UNESCO celebrates World Press Freedom Day every year on 3 May during which the Guillermo Cano Prize is attributed to honor the work of an individual or an organization defending or promoting freedom of expression.

===== UNESCO main activities on the Safety of Journalists =====
- Following a request from the Office of the UN Secretary General, UNESCO coordinated with the Office of the United Nations High Commissioner for Human Rights (OHCHR) to establish a focal points system for the safety of journalists in relevant United Nations entities.
- UNESCO's work on the safety of journalists focuses on six areas: public awareness; standards creation and policy development; monitoring and reporting; capacity building; academic research; and strengthening coalitions.
- The organization is intensifying its efforts to strengthen the capacity of member states to implement, on a voluntary basis, mechanisms to prevent attacks against journalists, to protect journalists, and to prosecute the perpetrators of these attacks.
- UNESCO also focuses on activities to raise awareness and train representatives of the judiciary, law enforcement agencies and parliaments on the importance of freedom of the press and the safety of journalists.
- UNESCO is also placing increased emphasis on tackling the specific threats faced by women journalists, both online and offline.

===== UNESCO's Journalists Safety Indicators =====
UNESCO's IPDC developed the Journalists Safety Indicators (JSI) to "pinpoint significant matters that show, or impact upon, the safety of journalists and the issue of impunity". These indicators map the key features that can help assess safety of journalists, and determine whether adequate follow-up is given to crimes committed against them. Analysis based on the Journalists Safety indicators have been conducted in Guatemala (2013), Kenya (2016), Nepal (2016), Pakistan (2013–2014).

==== The Organization for Security and Co-operation in Europe ====
The OSCE Representative on Freedom of the Media performs an early warning function and provides rapid response to serious noncompliance with regard to free media and free expression. The Representative maintains direct contacts with authorities, media and civil society representatives and other parties and shares his/ her observations and recommendations with the OSCE participating States twice a year.

=== Regional organizations ===
==== The Council of Europe ====
In May 2014, the Council of the European Union adopted the European Union Human Rights Guidelines on Freedom of Expression Online and Offline, which stated that the European Union would "take all appropriate steps to ensure the protection of journalists, both in terms of preventive measures and by urging effective investigations when violations occur". In April 2014, the Council of Europe's Committee of Ministers adopted a resolution on the protection of journalism and safety of journalists and other media actors, which called for concerted international efforts and led to the creation of an online platform for monitoring infringements of freedom of expression.

==== The Organization of American States ====
The Organization of American States (OAS) has played a proactive role in promoting the safety of journalists. In June 2017, the General Assembly of the OAS passed Resolution R86/17, which urged States ‘to implement comprehensive measures for prevention, protection, investigation and punishment of those responsible, as well as to put into action strategies to end impunity for crimes against journalists and share good practices'.

==== The Commonwealth ====
The Secretary-General of the Commonwealth has pledged support for the United Nations Plan of Action, working to promote journalist safety and institutional mechanisms that foster freedom of expression within member states across different regions.

=== Academia, civil society and media ===
The Centre for Freedom of the Media at the University of Sheffield launched the Journalists' Safety Research Network (JSRN). The JSRN contributes to advancing academic cooperation on the safety of journalists by increasing research capacity, collaboration and knowledge sharing within the academic community.

In 2014, Columbia University, United States, established Columbia Global Freedom of Expression, which brings together international experts and activists with the university's faculty and students, in order to "survey, document and strengthen free expression".

In 2015, the International Press Institute, Al Jazeera Media Network, Geneva Global Media and the Geneva Press Club presented the International Declaration and Best Practices on the Promotion of Journalists Safety. The declaration aims to reinforce and promote existing international obligations and mechanisms associated with the safety of journalists and contribute to the protection of their rights.

The same year, news media organizations joined forces with press freedom NGOs and journalists to launch the A Culture of Safety (ACOS) Alliance. The ACOS Alliance's Freelance Journalist Safety Principles, a set of practices for newsrooms and journalists on dangerous assignments, have been endorsed by 90 organizations around the world. In addition, a network of safety officers in media companies expanded following the meeting "Media Organizations Standing Up for the Safety of Journalists" held at UNESCO in February 2016.

Reporters without Borders (RSF) is an international non-governmental organization recognized as being of public utility in France. It aims to defend press freedom and the protection of journalism sources. It is mainly known for its annual ranking on the status of press freedom worldwide and monitoring of the crimes committed against journalists.

The Committee to Protect Journalists (CPJ) is a non-governmental organization that aims to "defend the right of journalists to report the news without fear of reprisal" and promote freedom of expression. The NGO monitors the imprisonment, disappearances and killings of journalists worldwide. The Organization informs on the status of freedom of the press and journalists safety in conflict countries and others, and helps journalists through services such as the emergencies response teams, the safety advisories and the security guide. CPJ's annual International Press Freedom Awards recognizes bravery for journalists from all around the world.

== See also ==
- Category:Lists of journalists killed
  - List of journalists killed in Russia
  - List of journalists killed in the Mexican Drug War
  - Killing of journalists in the Gaza war
- Maguindanao massacre
- Political repression
- Political violence
- Stochastic terrorism

== Sources ==
This article incorporates text from a free content work. Licensed under CC BY SA 3.0 IGO (license statement/permission). Text taken from World Trends in Freedom of Expression and Media Development, Global report 2017/2018, 200, UNESCO.
