= Ellison Barber =

American journalist

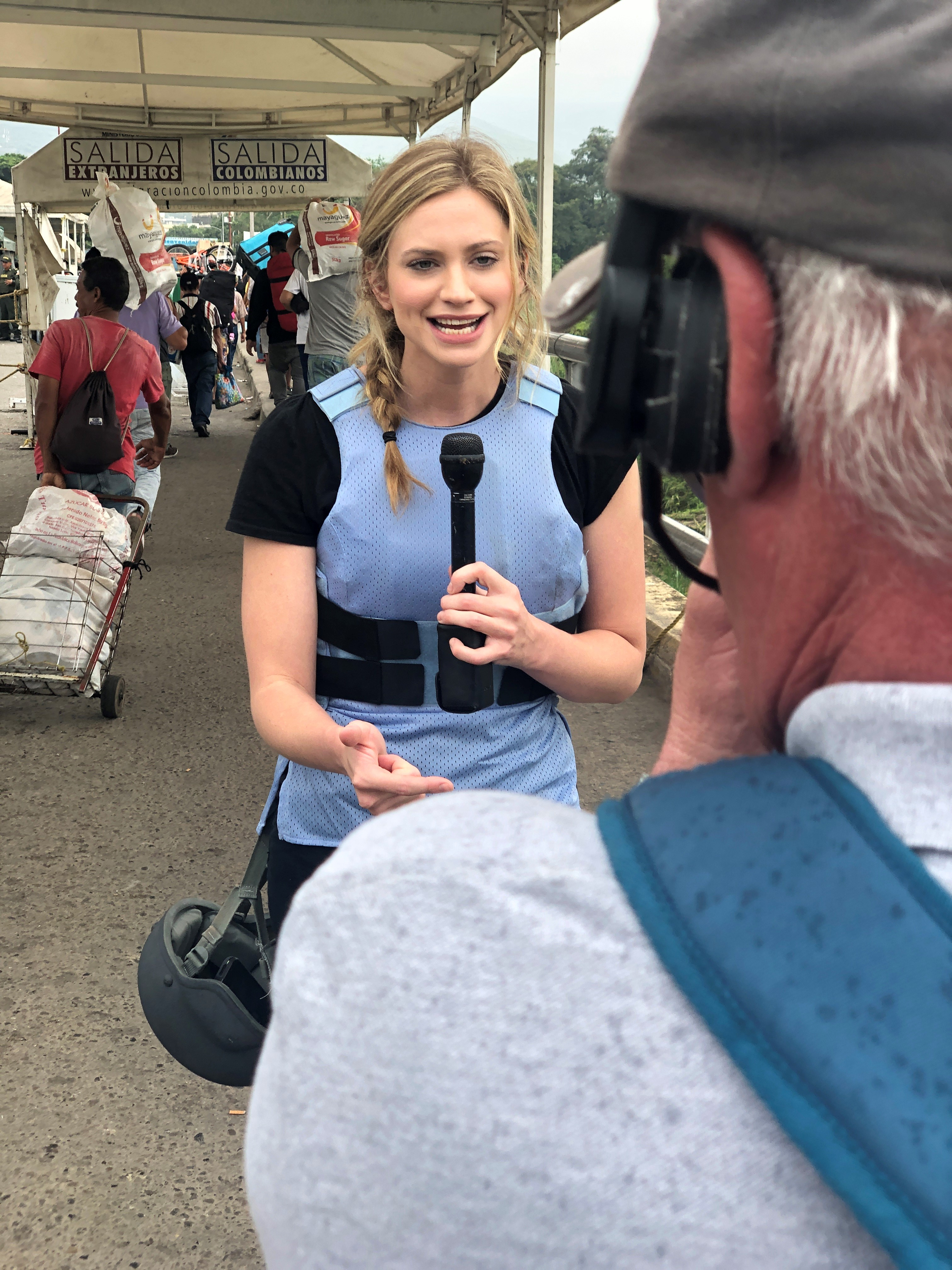
- Barber in 2019
- Born: Atlanta, Georgia, U.S.
- Education: Wofford College
- Occupation: Journalist
- Employer: NBC News
- Partner: Shannon Woodward

Ellison Litton Barber is an American journalist, correspondent for NBC News, and host of the Netflix true-crime series Allegedly with Ellison Barber.

She frequently reports from conflict zones and contributes reporting to all NBC News platforms, including NBC News, MSNBC and NBC News Now. Originally from Atlanta, Georgia, she graduated from Wofford College with a Bachelor of Arts in English in 2012.

Barber spent months on the ground reporting on the Russian invasion of Ukraine and was among the first group of international correspondents to report on the Gaza war in 2023.

== Career ==
Barber served as a general assignment reporter and the Prince George's County Deputy Bureau Chief for Washington's CBS affiliate, WUSA. At WUSA, Barber reported on an array of stories, including the 2015 Washington, D.C., mass killing of the Savopoulos family and their housekeeper Veralicia Figueroa, the March 2016 U.S. Capitol lockdown, and the protests following the shooting of Terrence Sterling. While at WUSA, Barber interviewed Washington Capitals' star Alexander Ovechkin during a blizzard. The unintentional encounter went viral.

=== Fox News (2017–2020) ===
In April 2017, she joined Fox News as a general assignment correspondent.

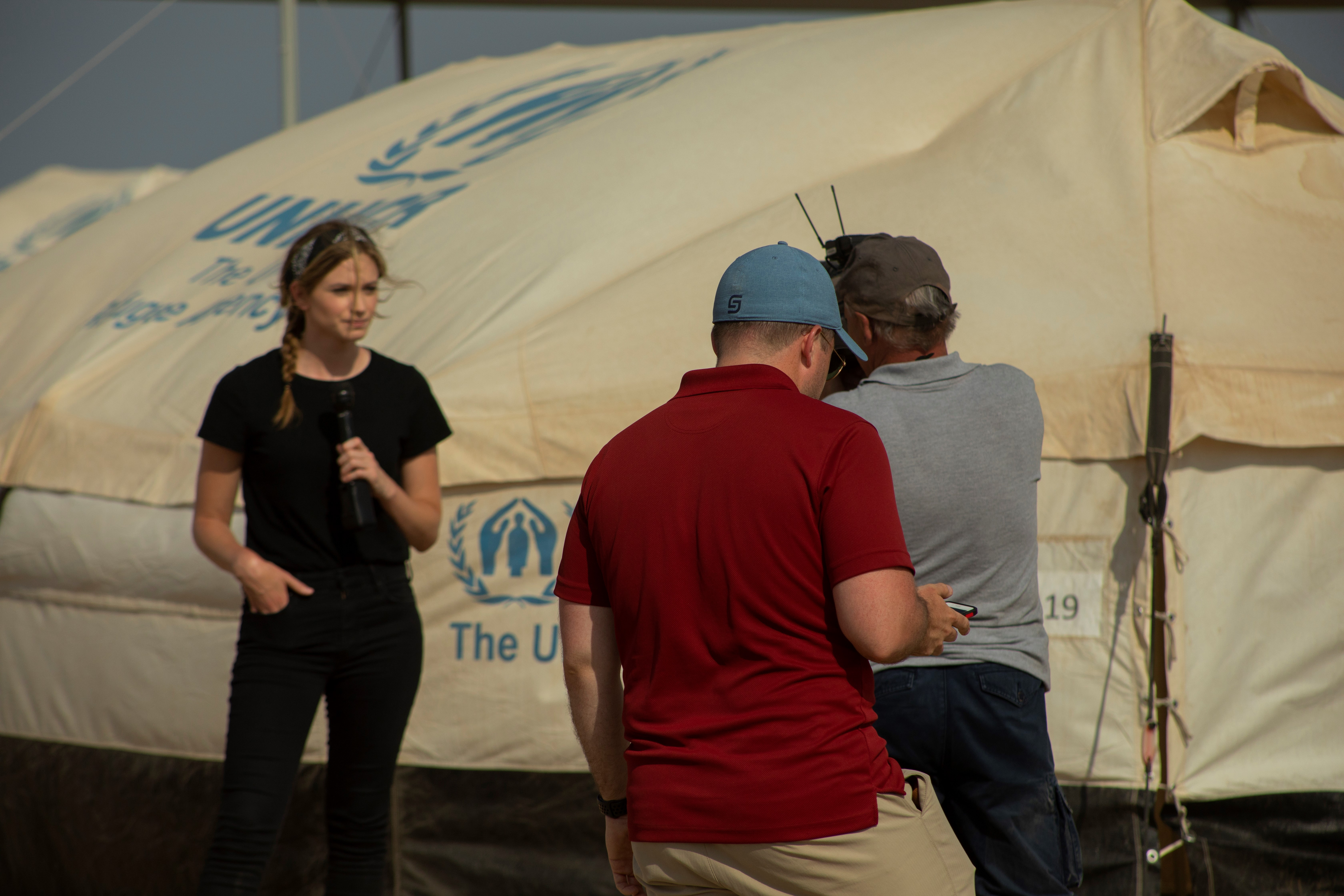
Ellison Barber and her crew at the UNHCR refugee assistance camp in Maicao, Colombia in May 2019.

In 2019, Barber reported on the political turmoil in Venezuela and the resulting refugee crisis in neighboring countries. She and her crew were reporting on the Venezuela-Colombia border when gunfire erupted near the Simón Bolívar International Bridge and a thirty-minute shootout ensued. Barber was also the first reporter for a U.S.-based English-language network to travel to Maicao, Colombia and cover the UNHCR assistance camp set up to help refugees fleeing the political crisis in Venezuela.

=== NBC News (2020–present) ===
Barber joined NBC News as a New York-based correspondent on April 15, 2020.

She extensively reported on the 2019-20 coronavirus pandemic in the United States. She reported inside COVID ICUs across the country, filing reports from Alaska to Mississippi.

Much of her career at NBC has been spent as a war correspondent covering conflicts around the globe. She reported from the frontlines of the Ukraine-Russia War and the Gaza war. While reporting along the Gaza border, she and her team came under rocket fire during multiple live reports.

Barber reported from Haiti following the 2024 Haitian jailbreak and the ouster of then-Acting President Ariel Henry.

== Accolades ==
Barber was reporting outside of the United States Capitol as a mob attacked and overtook the Capitol building. She remained live on NBC News throughout the evening. In 2022, she won a News & Documentary Emmy Award for her reporting on the siege of the U.S. Capitol.

In 2023, her war reporting earned her an Emmy nomination for Outstanding Emerging Journalist.

In 2026, Barber hosted the Netflix true-crime video/podcast series "Allegedly with Ellison Barber".

== Personal ==
Barber is queer/gay and publicly identifies as a member of the LGBTQ+ community. Since 2024, she has been in a relationship with actress Shannon Woodward.

== See also ==
- List of war correspondents
- New Yorkers in journalism
