= Suspension of Hunter Yelton =

Suspension of child for sexual harassment

- Date: Around December 9, 2013
- Venue: Lincoln School of Science and Technology
- Location: Cañon City, Colorado, United States

A 6-year-old student, Hunter Yelton, was suspended around December 9, 2013 on allegations of sexually harassing a 6-year-old girl at Lincoln School of Science and Technology in Cañon City, Colorado. The two families dispute whether the contact was consensual. The school – which said that Yelton's pattern of behavior met the school policy description of sexual harassment – received widespread media attention and public criticism for suspending Yelton and for labeling the behavior as sexual harassment.

== KRDO report ==
Local station KRDO reported on December 9, 2013 that Hunter Yelton, a 6-year-old boy at Lincoln elementary school, was suspended from school on grounds of alleged sexual harassment of a 6-year-old female classmate. Yelton and his mother, Jennifer Saunders, stated that Yelton had been suspended for giving the girl a "harmless peck" on the hand and that Yelton and the girl had a crush on each other; Saunders said the girl was "fine with it" and that Hunter and the girl consider themselves "boyfriend and girlfriend." Yelton had gotten into trouble previously for kissing the same girl on the cheek, and for rough-housing. Saunders expressed fury in an interview and stated that, while what Hunter did might have been wrong, the school had overreacted: "Remove sexual harassment, remove it from his record. I'm going to stand up and fight for him because that's not the case, that's not what happened at all."

== Reaction ==
The case went viral on social media; many commentators swiftly expressed outrage over the school's behavior. Some criticized the sexual harassment charge: "[6-year-olds] don't know anything about sex or sexual harassment. So how on earth can they be accused of such behavior?" Others criticized the school's zero-tolerance policy on sexual harassment. The Christian Science Monitor quoted experts stating: "This is just another example of going overboard on rules in schools that need to be more flexible" and "directing efforts at this particular six-year-old transgressor through a zero tolerance policy seems like an ineffective approach for handling this situation". However, the Monitor also quoted educational professor Paul Hewitt with a word of caution: "Before the general public jumps to conclusions about the unfairness, and even silliness, of this situation, it might be good to step back and recognize that we don't know what other behaviors this student has exhibited and because he is a minor we don't have a right to know".

School psychologist David Welsh said school boards are being forced to develop strict policies and follow them to the letter because of a large number of complaints being reported by students and teachers who face consequences if they keep silent.

James Taranto in the Wall Street Journal called Yelton "the littlest casualty in the war on men": "In Barack Obama's America, even a small boy can become a sexual suspect".

=== Defense of school ===
The school's superintendent, Robin Gooldy, stated that Yelton's pattern of behavior meets the school policy description of sexual harassment, which includes unwanted touching. Around December 11, the girl's mother, Jade Masters-Ownbey, came forward to praise the school district for doing a "great job" in protecting her daughter "from sexual harassment". Ownbey stated the kisses were "Not once, but over and over... not with her permission but sneaking up on her... not without warning and consequences prior to suspension", that Yelton had prevented her daughter from playing with other kids, and that "I had to put restrictions on her about which [sic] she was allowed to be around at school. I've had to coach her about what to do when you don't want someone touching you, but they won't stop." Ownbey judged "that boy deserved to be suspended for the continual harassment of my daughter": "He needs to learn not to do that. But there's forgiveness and it shouldn't be a huge story".

== Aftermath ==
Around December 12, the school agreed to label Yelton's behavior as "misconduct" rather than "sexual harassment". Gooldy stated "The category of behavior was changed from sexual harassment to misconduct. It has never been about labels for us, we just want the behavior to be corrected."

Yelton ended up being suspended for a total of four days for the misconduct. The girl Yelton kissed was moved to a different classroom shortly after Yelton was suspended. Around May 2014, Saunders placed her son in a new school in Florida; Saunders stated that the incident was one "motivating factor" for changing schools. Yelton's discipline record would reportedly be following him to the new school.

== Legacy ==
The suspension continues to be cited by pundits as an alleged example of overzealous punishment. The Economist attributed the suspension to an epidemic of students unfairly "getting into trouble for silly reasons": "A school in Canon City, Colorado suspended Hunter Yelton for violating its sexual-harassment policy. His crime? Kissing a girl on the hand." In 2015, Hollie McKay reported in Fox News that the Yelton incident was one of a list of "cases of educators imposing punishments that did not seem to fit the crime". David Harsanyi satirically compared Yelton and other "victims of jumpy teachers" to alleged clock-bomb hoaxer Ahmed Mohamed, asking why Mohamed had been invited to the White House where other high-profile "victims" had not. Social psychologist Carol Tavris wrote for eSkeptic: "Be careful! Remember the stupidity of 'zero tolerance' programs in schools, where a kid who brings a pocket knife for show-and-tell, or a 6-year-old boy who kisses a 6-year-old girl, got expelled?" [sic]

In 2015, Allison Pearson in The Telegraph attributed the incident to a trend of "seeking out sexist slights" where no slight is intended. U.S. Presidential candidate Mike Huckabee labeled it as "political correctness".

== See also ==
- Zero tolerance (schools)
