= Hillegas =

Hillegas is a surname. Notable people with the surname include:

- Howard C. Hillegas (1872–1918), American writer, journalist and newspaper editor
- Michael Hillegas (1729–1804), Treasurer of the United States
- Shawn Hillegas (born 1964), American baseball player

== See also ==
- Hillegass
