= Hillegass =

Hillegass is a surname. Notable people with the surname include:

- Aaron Hillegass (born 1969), American writer
- Clifton Hillegass (1918–2001), American publisher

== See also ==
- Hillegas
