= New York World =

Daily newspaper in New York City (1860–1931)

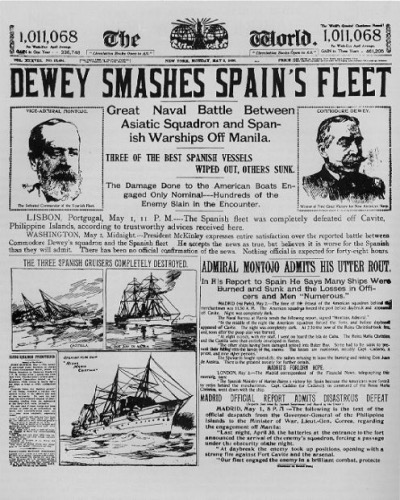
- New York World cover announcing conquest of Dewey of the Spanish Navy in the Battle of Manila Bay in May 1898
- Type: Daily newspaper
- Format: Broadsheet
- Owners: Manton Marble (1862–1876); Thomas A. Scott (1876–1879); Jay Gould (1879–1883); Joseph Pulitzer (1883–1911); Pulitzer family (1911–1931)
- Founded: 1860; 166 years ago
- Ceased publication: February 27, 1931; 95 years ago
- Political alignment: Independent Democratic/Progressive
- Headquarters: New York World Building
- Circulation: 313,000 (1931)
- OCLC number: 32646018

The New York World was a newspaper published in New York City from 1860 to 1931. The paper played a major role in the history of American newspapers as a leading national voice of the Democratic Party. From 1883 to 1911 under publisher Joseph Pulitzer, it was a pioneer in yellow journalism, capturing readers' attention with sensation, sports, sex and scandal and pushing its daily circulation to the one-million mark. It was sold in 1931 and merged into the New York World-Telegram.

== History ==
=== Early years ===
The World was founded in 1860 by Alexander Cummings, who had previously founded the Philadelphia Evening Bulletin, but it did not prosper in his two years as publisher. From 1862 to 1876, it was edited by Manton Marble, who was also its proprietor. During the 1864 United States presidential election, the World was shut down for three days after it published forged documents purportedly from Abraham Lincoln. Marble, disgusted by the defeat of Samuel Tilden in the 1876 presidential election, sold the paper after the election to a group headed by Thomas A. Scott, the president of the Pennsylvania Railroad, who used the paper "as a propaganda vehicle for his stock enterprises." But Scott was unable to meet the newspaper's growing losses, and in 1879 he sold it to financier Jay Gould as part of a deal that also included the Texas & Pacific Railroad. Gould, like Scott, used the paper for his own purposes, employing it to help him take over Western Union. But Gould, like Scott, could not turn the financial state of the newspaper around, and by the 1880s, it was losing $40,000 a year.

=== Joseph Pulitzer years ===
Joseph Pulitzer bought the World in 1883 and began an aggressive era of circulation building. Reporter Nellie Bly became one of America's first investigative journalists, often working undercover. As a publicity stunt for the paper, inspired by the Jules Verne novel Around the World in Eighty Days, she traveled around the world in 72 days in 1889–1890. In 1890, Pulitzer built the New York World Building, the tallest office building in the world at the time.

In 1885, Pulitzer used the World to raise money for the Statue of Liberty's pedestal, after the American committee ran out of funds. The paper promised to print the name of every donor, no matter how small the gift, and by August 11, 1885, it had collected over $100,000 from about 125,000 people, most giving $1 or less.

In 1889, Julius Chambers was appointed by Pulitzer as managing editor of the New York World; he served until 1891. In 1890, Pulitzer, Chambers, et al. were indicted for posthumous criminal libel against Alexander T. Stewart for accusing him of "a dark and secret crime", as the man who "invited guests to meet his mistresses at his table", and as "a pirate of the dry goods ocean." The charges were dismissed by the court. This sort of criminal action was common at the time and both Pulitzer and Chambers were indicted in a number of cases, in some of which they were acquitted, in others convicted.

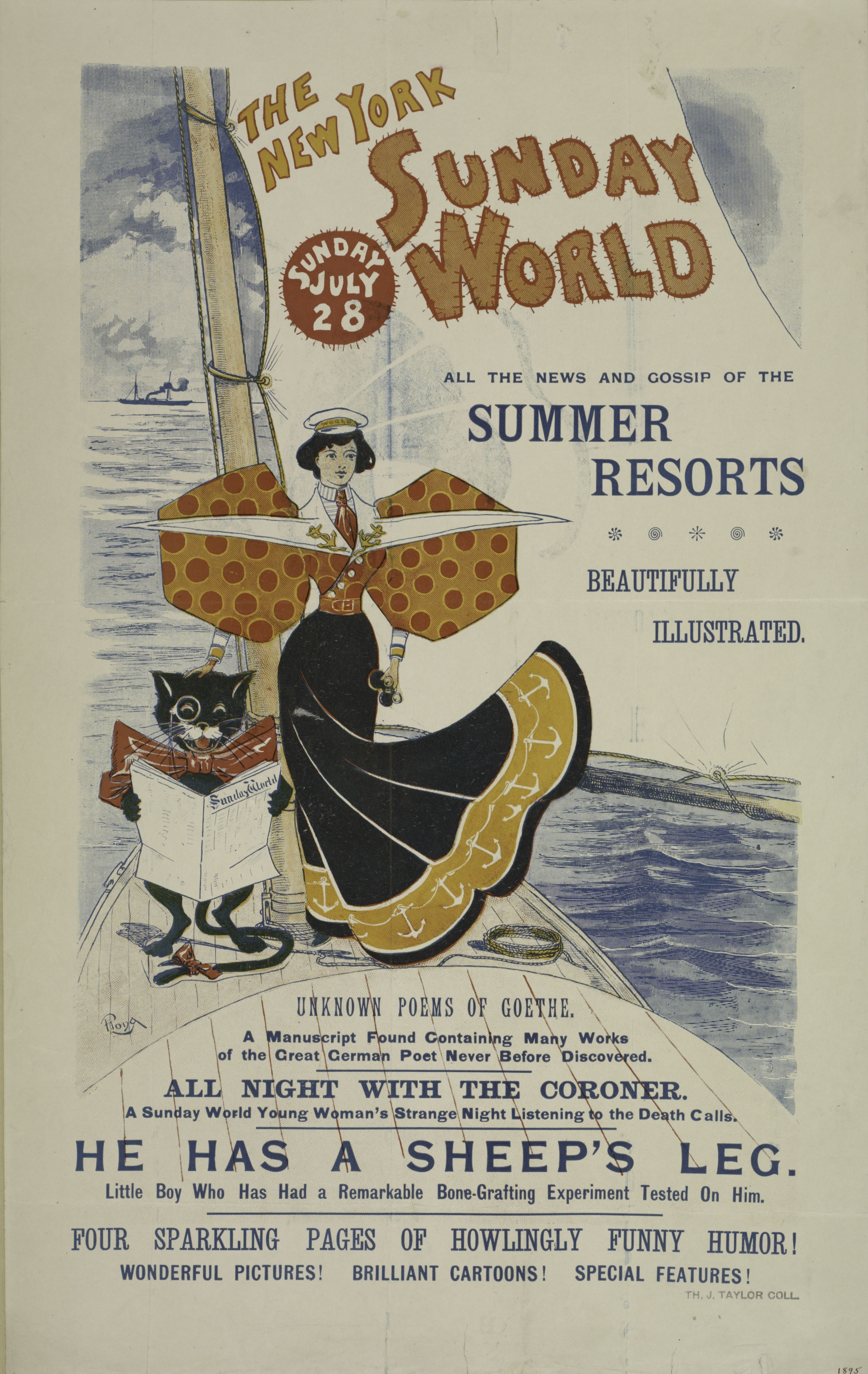
Advertising poster for the July 28, 1895, New York Sunday World

In 1896, the World began using a four-color printing press; it was the first newspaper to launch a color supplement, which featured The Yellow Kid cartoon Hogan's Alley. It joined a circulation battle with William Randolph Hearst's New York Journal. In 1899 Pulitzer and Hearst were the cause of the newsboys' strike of 1899, which led to Pulitzer's circulation dropping by 70%.

The World was attacked for being "sensational", and its circulation battles with Hearst's Journal gave rise to the term yellow journalism. The charges of sensationalism were most frequently leveled at the paper by more established publishers, who resented Pulitzer's courting of the immigrant classes. And while the World presented its fair share of crime stories, it also published damning exposés of tenement abuses. After a heat wave in 1883 killed a disproportionate number of poor children, the World published stories about it, featuring such headlines as "Lines of Little Hearses". Its coverage spurred action in the city for reform. Hearst reproduced Pulitzer's approach in the San Francisco Examiner and later in the Journal.

Charles Chapin was hired in 1898 as city editor of the Evening World. He was most known for embracing the sensational and showing little empathy in the face of tragedy, only taking a more solemn tone when reporting on the assassination of William McKinley in 1901. He controlled the newsroom with an iron fist, and was commonly despised by the journalists who worked for him. Chapin fired 108 newspaper men during his tenure. However, Stanley Walker still referred to him as "the greatest city editor that ever lived." His time at the World ended when, after falling into financial ruin, he murdered his wife in 1918. He was sentenced to Sing Sing Prison and died there in 1930.

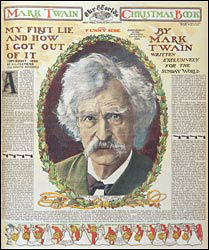
Special Christmas 1899 section featuring a story by Mark Twain

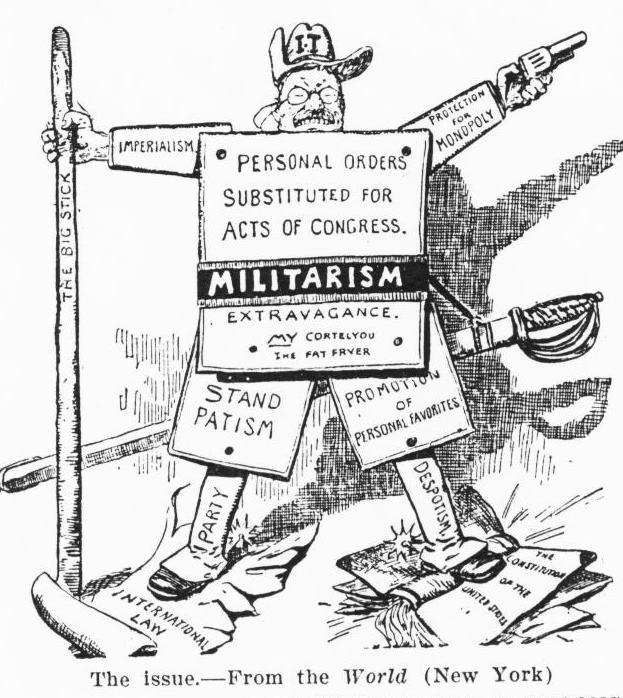
1904 political cartoon of President Theodore Roosevelt

Pulitzer hired Frank Irving Cobb on a trial basis as the editor of the World in 1904. Cobb, a fiercely independent Kansan, resisted Pulitzer's attempts to "run the office" from his home. The elder man felt invested in the paper and continually meddled with Cobb's work. They both supported Woodrow Wilson but disagreed in many other areas.

Joseph Pulitzer resigned by issuing a carefully worded resignation notice in 1907; Pulitzer's son Ralph took over administrative responsibility of The World. Pulitzer's resignation notice was printed in almost every New York paper — Cobb did not publish it in the World. Joseph Pulitzer raged at the insult, but Ralph gained respect for Cobb's editorials and independent spirit. Exchanges, commentaries, and messages between them increased. The good rapport between the two was based largely on Cobb's flexibility. In May 1908, Cobb and Pulitzer met to outline plans for a consistent editorial policy.

Pulitzer's demands for editorials on contemporary news led to overwork by Cobb. The publisher sent his managing editor on a six-week tour of Europe to restore his spirit. Shortly after Cobb's return, Pulitzer died. Cobb then finally published Pulitzer's resignation from 1907. Cobb maintained the editorial policies he had had with Pulitzer until he died of cancer in 1923.

=== Later years ===
When Pulitzer died in 1911, he passed control of the World to his sons Ralph, Joseph and Herbert. The World continued to grow under its executive editor Herbert Bayard Swope, who hired writers such as Frank Sullivan and Deems Taylor. Among the World's noted journalists were columnists Franklin Pierce Adams (F.P.A.), who wrote "The Conning Tower"; Heywood Broun, who penned "It Seems to Me" on the editorial page; and future hardboiled fiction writer James M. Cain. C. M. Payne created several comic strips for the newspaper.

The paper published the first crossword puzzle on December 21, 1913. The feature was billed as a "Word-Cross Puzzle."

The annual reference book called The World Almanac was founded by the newspaper, and the name World Almanac is directly descended from the newspaper.

The paper ran a twenty-one article series that was an exposé on the inner workings of the Ku Klux Klan, starting September 6, 1921.

In 1931, Pulitzer's heirs went to court to sell the World. A surrogate court judge decided in their favor; Scripps-Howard chain owner Roy W. Howard purchased the paper to eliminate its competition. He closed the World and laid off the staff of 3,000 after the final issue was printed on February 27, 1931, then merely replaced the word "Evening" on his afternoon paper, the Evening Telegram, renaming it the New York World-Telegram.

== Comic strips ==
The New York World was one of the first newspapers to publish comic strips, starting around 1890, and contributed greatly to the development of the American comic strip. Notable strips that originated with the World included Richard F. Outcault's Hogan's Alley (featuring The Yellow Kid), The Captain and the Kids, Everyday Movies, Fritzi Ritz, Joe Jinks, and Little Mary Mixup. Under the names World Feature Service and New York World Press Publishing the company also syndicated comic strips to other newspapers around the country beginning around 1905. With Scripps' acquisition of the World newspaper and its syndication assets in February 1931, the World's most popular strips were brought over to Scripps' United Feature Syndicate.

== Legacy ==
Janet E. Steele argues that Joseph Pulitzer put a stamp on his age when he brought his brand of journalism from St. Louis to New York in 1883. In his New York World, Pulitzer emphasized illustrations, advertising, and a culture of consumption for working men. He believed they saved money to enjoy life with their families when they could, at Coney Island, for example.

By contrast, the long-established editor Charles A. Dana, of The Sun, held to a traditional view of the working man as one engaged in a struggle to better his working conditions and to improve himself. Dana thought that readers in the 20th century followed fewer faddish illustrations and wished newspapers did not need advertising. Dana resisted buying a Linotype. In time the more sensational approach to news, advertising, and content triumphed.

== Revival ==
On May 16, 2011, the Columbia University Graduate School of Journalism announced that it was launching an online publication named The New York World, in honor of the original newspaper published by Joseph Pulitzer, who founded the graduate school. The university said the mission of the publication would be "to provide New York City citizens with accountability journalism about government operations that affect their lives." It was to be staffed mainly by those who have completed master's or doctoral degrees, and other affiliates of the school. The online publication focuses on data journalism and collaborated with a number of local and national news outlets. The World lists contributors and an editor, but has not published new content since 2016.

== Notable journalists of the World ==
- Eunice Eloisae Gibbs Allyn (1847–1916)
- John A. Arneaux (1855–)
- Harriet Hubbard Ayer (1849–1903)
- John L. Balderston (1889–1954)
- Djuna Barnes (1892–1982)
- Nellie Bly (Elizabeth Jane Cochrane) (1864–1922)
- Heywood Broun (1888–1939)
- Mazie E. Clemens (1890s–1952)
- Irvin S. Cobb (1876–1944)
- Eliza Archard Conner (1838–1912)
- Varina Davis (1826 – 1906), columnist after her move to New York; widow of the Confederate president, Jefferson Davis
- Howard C. Hillegas (1872–1918)
- Joseph Jackson (1894 – 1932), assistant drama editor at The World and Hollywood screenwriter
- Mary Elizabeth Lease (1850–1933)
- Walter Lippman (1889–1974)
- St. Clair McKelway (1905–1980)
- John McNaught (1849–1938)
- William Brown Meloney (1877–1925)
- Charles Edward Russell (1886–1894)
- Helen Rowland (1875–1950)
- Frank Sullivan (1892–1976)
- Deems Taylor (1885–1966)
- Albert Payson Terhune (1872–1942)
- Paul West (1871–1918), editor, journalist, playwright, lyricist, and author
- Marie Robinson Wright (1853–1914), American journalist, traveler, historian, author

== See also ==
- History of American newspapers
