= Carmen Lasorella =

Italian journalist

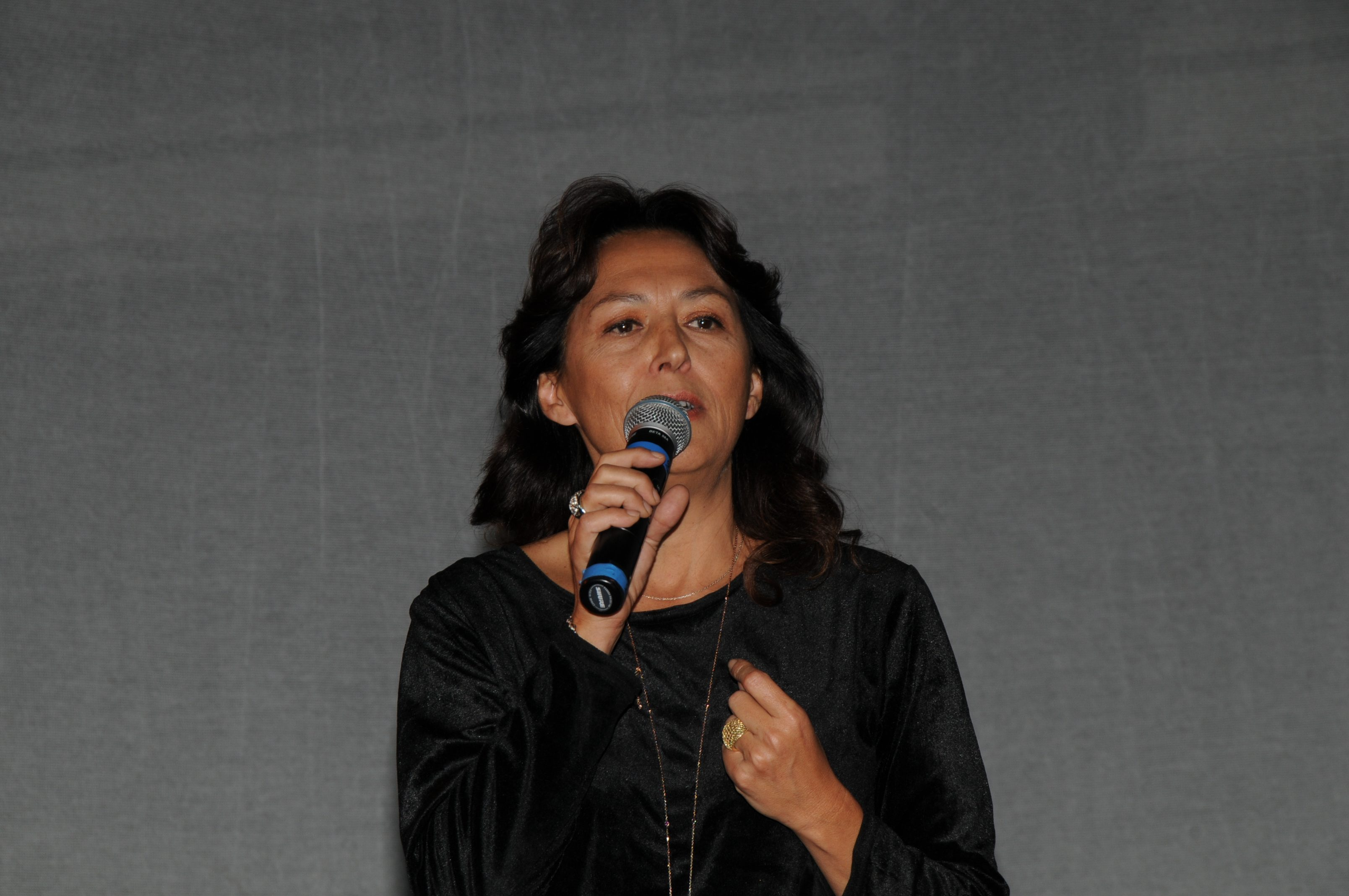
- Lasorella in 2008
- Born: Carmela Lasorella; 28 February 1955 (age 71); Matera, Basilicata, Italy
- Education: Sapienza University of Rome
- Occupations: Journalist, news anchor and television presenter
- Spouse: Giuseppe Falegnami (m. 2012; sep. 2013)

Carmen Lasorella (born 28 February 1955) is an Italian journalist, former news anchor and television presenter.

== Life ==
Lasorella was born in Matera and grew up in Potenza, Basilicata. While still in high school, she began writing for La Gazzetta del Mezzogiorno at the age of 14. After earning a law degree from Sapienza University of Rome, she worked for the Il globo daily newspaper and the Radiocor and ANSA news agencies. In 1979, she made her debut as a newscaster for TG3. In 1984, she moved to TG2, where she served as an anchor for 11 years, becoming one of its most iconic figures. In 1987, she became the first Italian television war correspondent, embedding with the Italian Navy during the Iran–Iraq War. In the early 1990s, she covered conflicts in the Horn of Africa, including the fall of the Derg regime and the Djiboutian Civil War. She also conducted the final interview with Somali leader Siad Barre.

In 1995, she survived an ambush in Mogadishu in which her security guards and her colleague, Marcello Palmisano, lost their lives. The motive behind the massacre remains unknown, although some speculated the victims were inadvertently caught up in the "banana war" between the Italian-Somali joint venture Somal Fruit and Sombana, a local company owned by the Dole Corporation. Both companies allegedly employed mercenaries to control the area. Lasorella and her crew were apparently mistaken for Somal Fruit executives by gunmen on the payroll of the rival faction. Both companies denied any involvement in the incident. Additionally, she documented events in the Middle and Far East, interviewing prominent figures such as Yasser Arafat, Shimon Peres, Han Dongfang, and Aung San Suu Kyi. She hosted several talk shows from the mid-1990s to the early 2000s and was appointed General Director of San Marino RTV, serving from 2008 to 2012. In 2019, she ran in the Basilicata regional elections on a civic list but withdrew her candidacy a month before the vote.

== Personal life ==
Carmen Lasorella is divorced and has no children. She considers herself Roman Catholic.

== Television ==
- TG3 (Rete 3, 1979-1982)
- TG2 (Rai 2, 1984-1995)
- Politistrojka (Rai 2, 1990)
- Tg2 Dossier Notte (Rai 1, 1994)
- Cliché (Rai 1, 1996)
- Primadonna (Rai 1, 1998)
- Visite a domicilio (Rai 2, 2003)

== Works ==
- Verde e zafferano: a voce alta per la Birmania (in Italian), Bompiani, 2008, ISBN 978-88-452-6051-3
- Vera e gli schiavi del terzo millennio (in Italian), Marietti, 2023, ISBN 978-88-211-1388-8
