= War correspondent =

Journalist specializing in coverage of armed conflicts

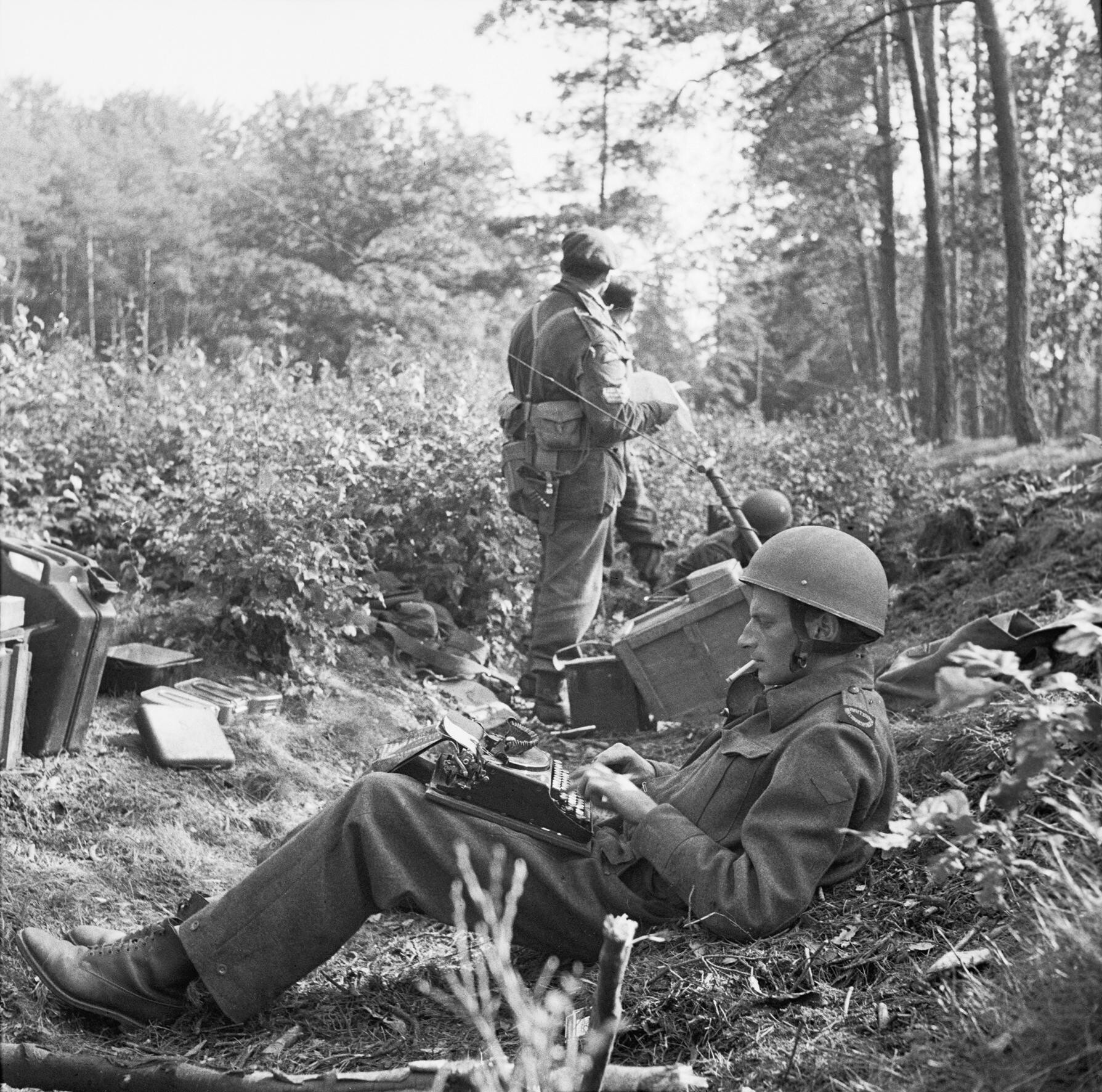
Alan Wood, war correspondent for the Daily Express, types a dispatch during the Battle of Arnhem in September 1944.

A war correspondent is a journalist who covers stories first-hand from a war zone.

War correspondence stands as one of journalism's most important and impactful forms. War correspondents operate in the most conflict-ridden parts of the world. Once there, they attempt to get close enough to the action to provide written accounts, photos, or film footage. It is often considered the most dangerous form of journalism.

Modern war correspondence emerged from the news reporting of military conflicts during the French Revolution and Napoleonic Wars. Its presence grew in the middle of the 19th century, with American journalists covering the Mexican-American War (1846–1848) and the European newspapermen writing reports from the Crimean War (1853–1856).

== History ==
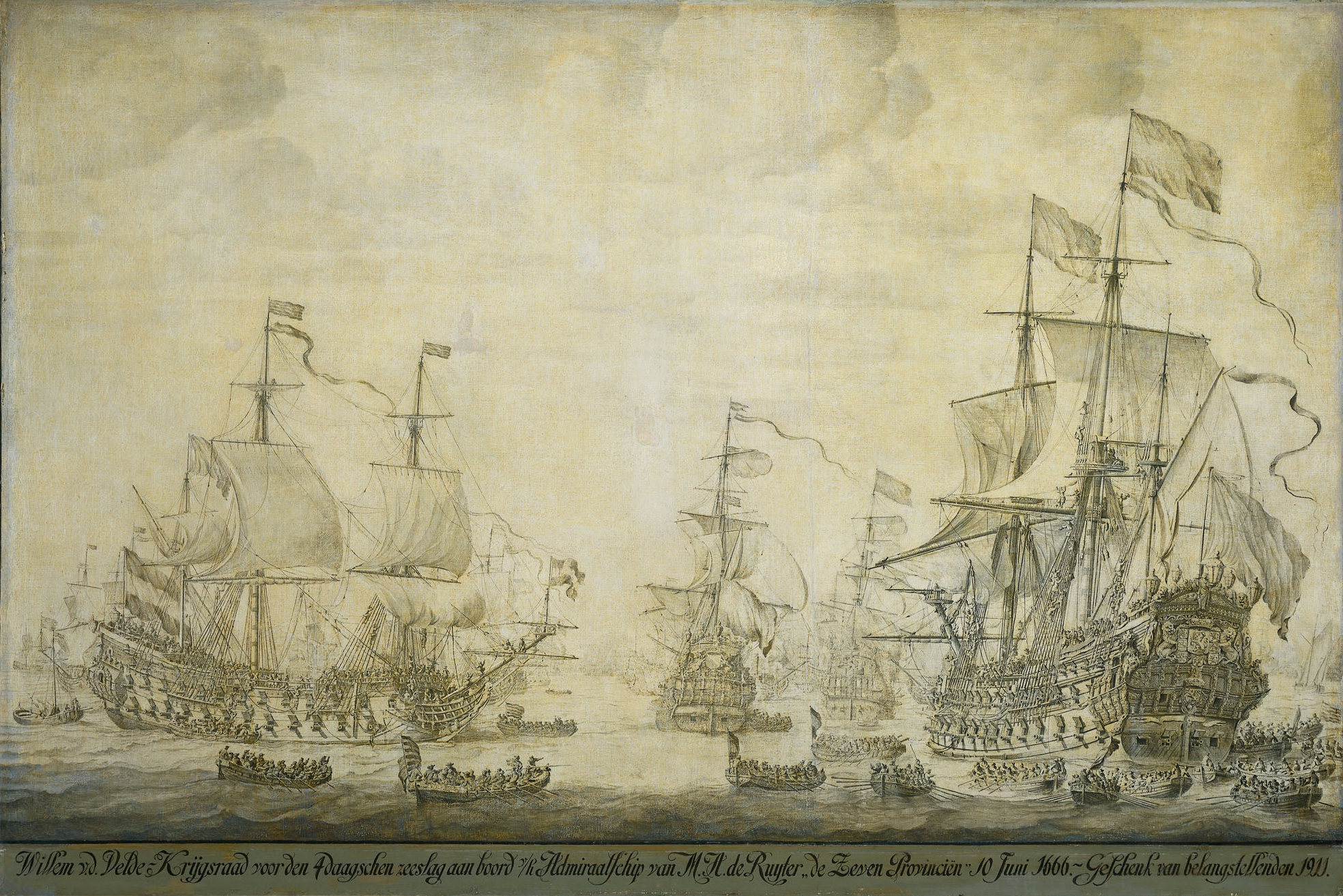
Battle council on the De Zeven Provinciën by Willem van de Velde the Elder. The prelude to the Four Days Battle in 1666.

People have written about wars for thousands of years. Herodotus's account of the Persian Wars is similar to journalism, though he did not himself participate in the events. Thucydides, who some years later wrote a history of the Peloponnesian War was a commander and an observer to the events he described. Memoirs of soldiers became an important source of military history when that specialty developed. War correspondents, as specialized journalists, began working after the printing of news for publication became commonplace.

In the 18th century the Baroness Frederika Charlotte Riedesel's Letters and Journals Relating to the War of the American Revolution and the Capture of the German Troops at Saratoga is regarded as the first account of war by a woman. Her description of the events that took place in the Marshall House are particularly poignant because she was in the midst of battle.

The first modern war correspondent is said to be Dutch painter Willem van de Velde, who in 1653 took to sea in a small boat to observe a naval battle between the Dutch and the English, of which he made many sketches on the spot, which he later developed into one big drawing that he added to a report he wrote to the States General. A further modernization came with the development of newspapers and magazines. One of the earliest war correspondents was Henry Crabb Robinson, who covered Napoleon's campaigns in Spain and Germany for The Times of London. Another early correspondent was William Hicks whose letters describing the Battle of Trafalgar (1805) were also published in The Times. Winston Churchill in 1899, working as a correspondent, became notorious as an escaped prisoner of war.

Early film newsreels and television news rarely had war correspondents. Rather, they would simply collect footage provided by other sources, often the government, and the news anchor would then add narration. This footage was often staged as cameras were large and bulky until the introduction of small, portable motion picture cameras during World War II. The situation changed dramatically with the Vietnam War when networks from around the world sent cameramen with portable cameras and correspondents. This proved damaging to the United States as the full brutality of war became a daily feature on the nightly news.

News coverage gives combatants an opportunity to forward information and arguments to the media. By this means, conflict parties attempt to use the media to gain support from their constituencies and dissuade their opponents. The continued progress of technology has allowed live coverage of events via satellite up-links and the rise of twenty-four hour news channels has led to a heightened demand for material to fill the hours.

Only some conflicts receive extensive worldwide coverage, however. Among recent wars, the Kosovo War, the Persian Gulf War and the Russo-Ukrainian war received a great deal of coverage. In contrast, the largest war in the last half of the 20th century, the Iran–Iraq War, received far less substantial coverage. This is typical for wars among less-developed countries, as audiences are less interested and the reports do little to increase sales and ratings. The lack of infrastructure makes reporting more difficult and expensive, and the conflicts are also far more dangerous for war correspondents.

War correspondents are protected by the Geneva Conventions of 1949 and their additional protocols. In general, journalists are considered civilians so they have all rights related to the civilians in a conflict.

=== Crimean War ===
William Howard Russell, who covered the Crimean War, also for The Times, was perhaps the first modern war correspondent. The stories from this era, which were almost as lengthy and analytical as early books on war, took numerous weeks from being written to being published.

=== Third Italian War of Independence ===
Another renowned journalist, Ferdinando Petruccelli della Gattina, Italian correspondent of European newspapers such as La Presse, Journal des débats, Indépendance Belge and The Daily News, was known for his extremely gory style in his articles but involving at the same time. Jules Claretie, critic of Le Figaro, was amazed about his correspondence of the Battle of Custoza, during the Third Italian War of Independence. Claretie wrote, "Nothing could be more fantastic and cruelly true than this tableau of agony. Reportage has never given a superior artwork."

=== Russo-Japanese War ===
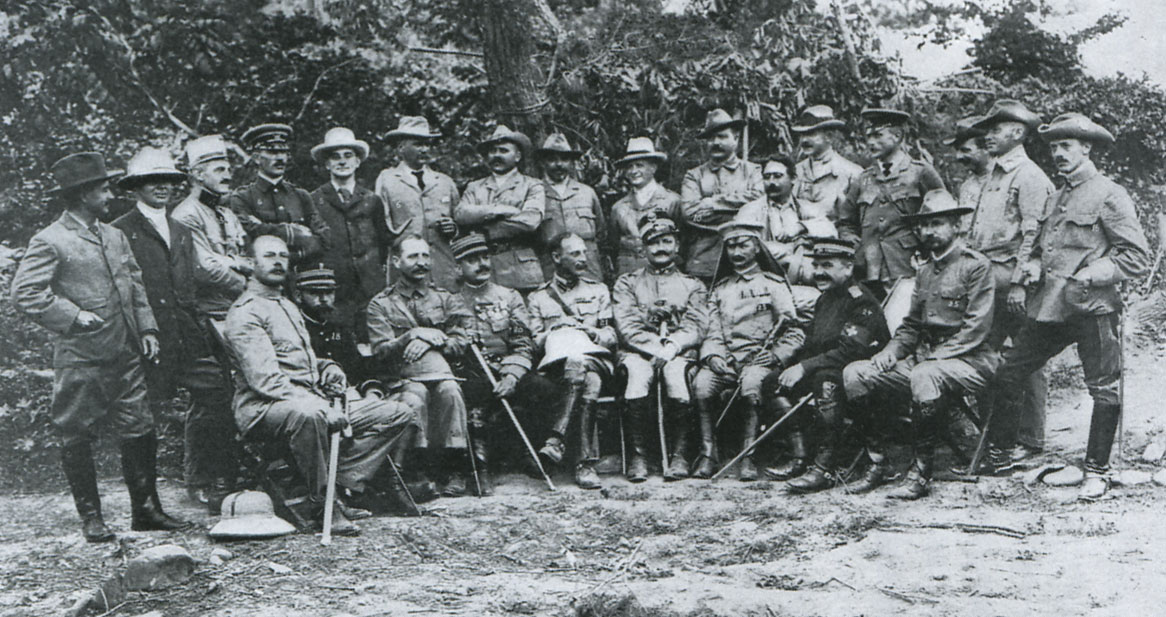
Western military attachés and war correspondents with the Japanese forces after the Battle of Shaho in 1904

When the telegraph was developed, reports could be sent on a daily basis and events could be reported as they occurred. That is when short, mainly descriptive stories as used today became common. Press coverage of the Russo-Japanese War was affected by restrictions on the movement of reporters and strict censorship. In all military conflicts which followed this 1904–1905 war, close attention to more managed reporting was considered essential.

=== First and Second Balkan Wars ===
The First Balkan War (1912–1913) between the Balkan League (Serbia, Greece, Montenegro and Bulgaria) and the Ottoman Empire, and the Second Balkan War (1913) between Bulgaria and its former allies Serbia and Greece, was actively covered by a large number of foreign newspapers, news agencies, and movie companies. An estimated 200–300 war correspondents, war photographers, war artists, and war cinematographers were active during these two nearly sequential conflicts.

=== First World War ===
The First World War was characterized by rigid censorship. British Lord Kitchener hated reporters, and they were banned from the Front at the start of the war. But reporters such as Basil Clarke and Philip Gibbs lived as fugitives near the Front, sending back their reports. The Government eventually allowed some accredited reporters in April 1915, and this continued until the end of the war. This allowed the Government to control what they saw.

French authorities were equally opposed to war journalism, but less competent (criticisms of the French high command were leaked to the press during the Battle of Verdun in 1916). By far the most rigid and authoritarian regime was imposed by the United States, though General John J. Pershing allowed embedded reporters (Floyd Gibbons had been severely wounded at the Battle of Belleau Wood in 1918).

=== Second World War ===
American broadcast journalist Edward R. Murrow gained great public acclaim in the United States for his vivid and compelling live radio reports from London during the Blitz, prior to U.S. entry into World War II in December 1941.

==== United Kingdom ====
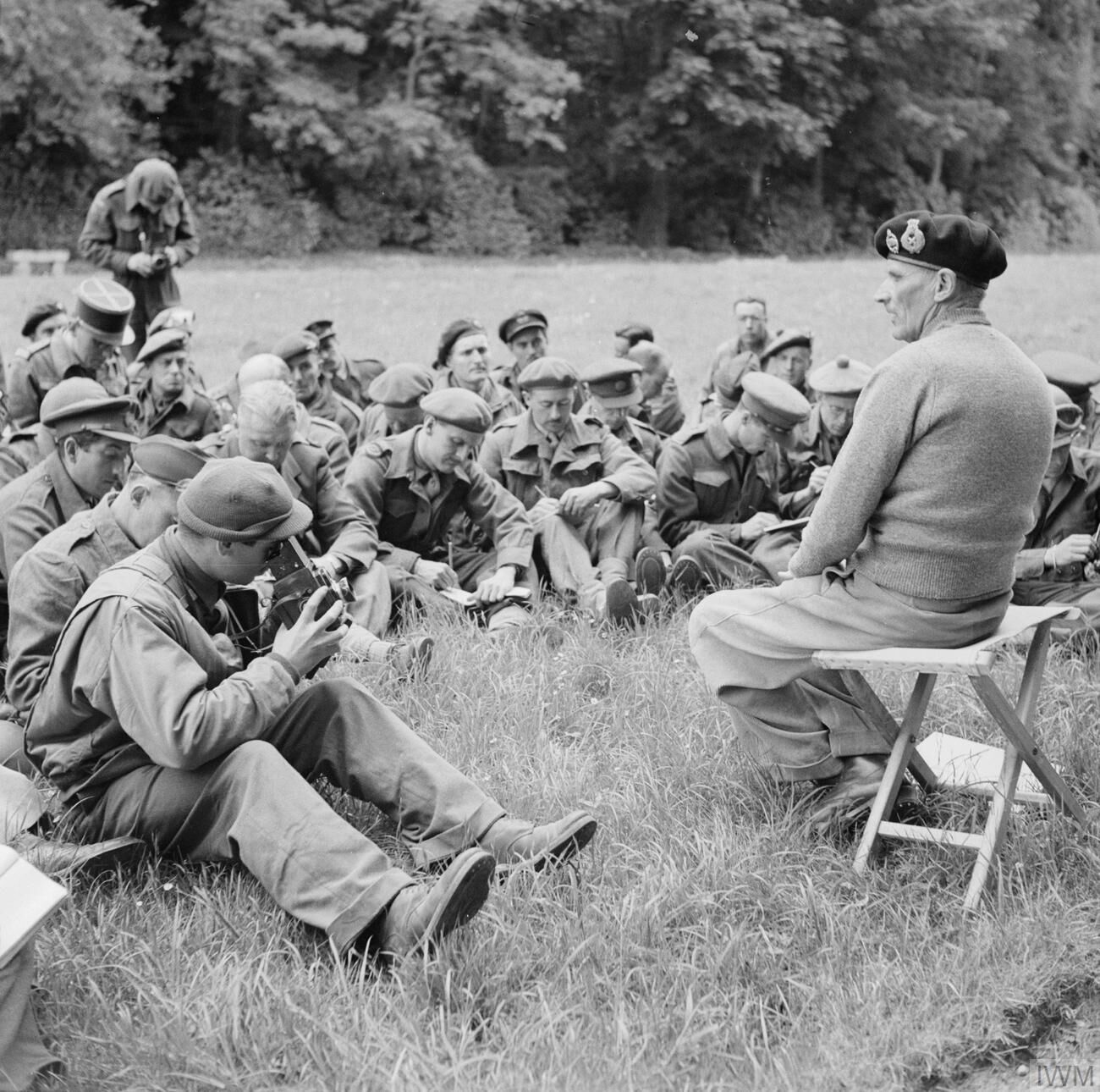
General Sir Bernard Montgomery addressing Allied war correspondents at a press conference at his headquarters in Normandy during June 1944

At the beginning of the war the matters of war reporting came under the authority of a Public Relations Section created as part of the British Expeditionary Force (BEF). At the beginning of World War II, the War Office urged all the major newspapers to nominate men to accompany the BEF. While the official process of vetting journalists took place, the War Office authorised to provide a limited 'eye-witness' coverage. Journalist Alex Clifford became one the first 'eye-witness' who joined the BEF units in France in September 1939. The first official group of British, Commonwealth and American correspondents arrived in France on October 10, 1939 (among them were O. D. Gallagher, Bernard Gray).

All of the war reporting was subject to censorship, directed by the chief press censor George Pirie Thomson. At the start of the war the Royal Navy implemented a policy that curtailed war correspondents' presence on its ships. This positioned them as the most conservative branch of the British military in terms of media engagement.

=== Vietnam War ===
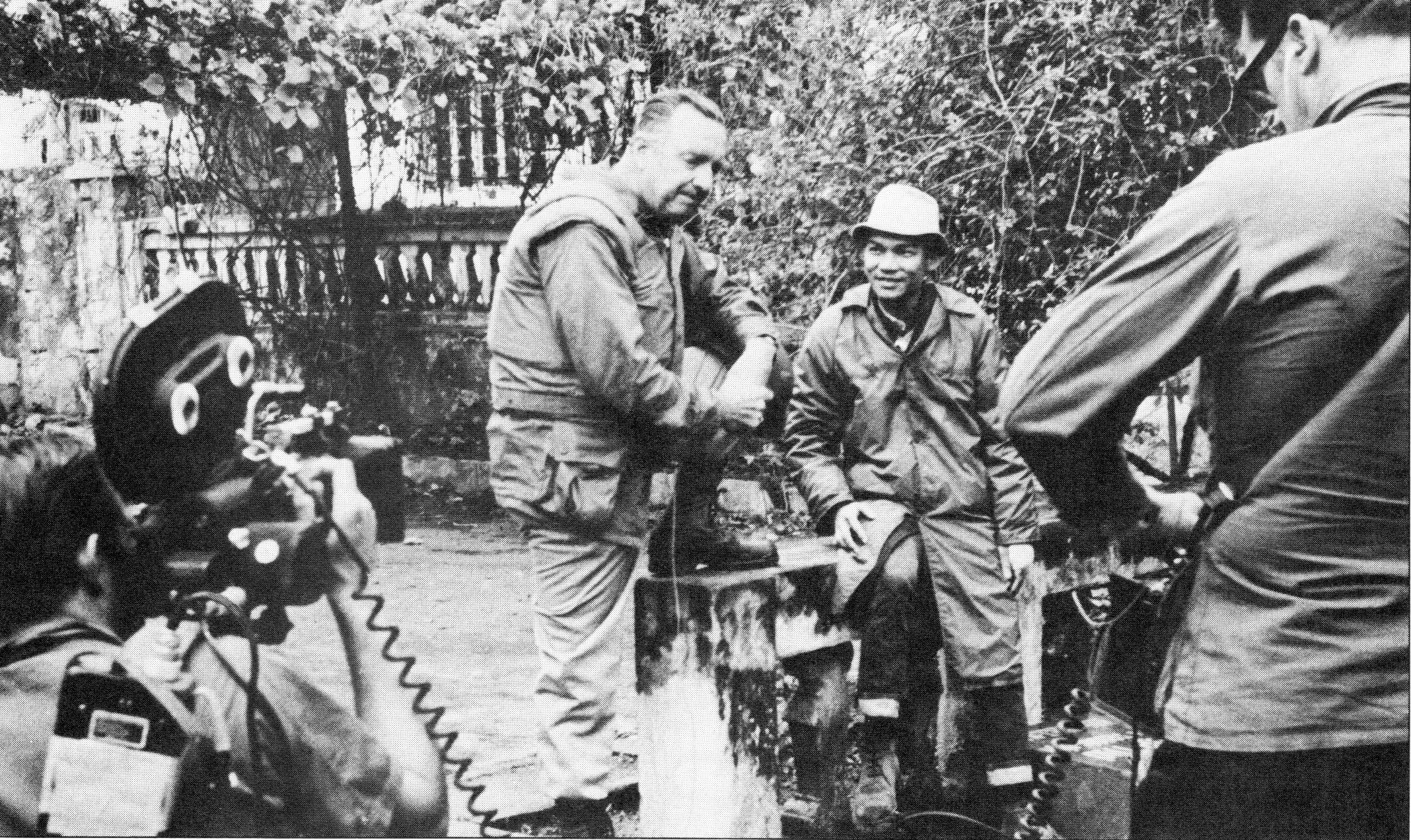
Walter Cronkite conducting an interview in Hue during February 1968

The US conflict in Vietnam saw the tools and access available to war correspondents expanded significantly. Innovations such as cheap and reliable hand-held color video cameras, and the proliferation of television sets in Western homes give Vietnam-era correspondents the ability to portray conditions on the ground more vividly and accurately than ever before. Additionally, the US Military allowed unprecedented access for journalists, with almost no restrictions on the press, unlike in previous conflicts. These factors produced military coverage the likes of which had never been seen or anticipated, with explicit coverage of the human suffering produced by the war available right in the living rooms of everyday people.

Vietnam-era war correspondence was markedly different from that of WWI and WWII, with more focus on investigative journalism and discussion of the ethics surrounding the war and America's role in it. Reporters from dozens of media outlets were dispatched to Vietnam, with the number of correspondents surpassing 400 at the peak of the war. Vietnam was a dangerous war for these journalists, and 68 would be killed before the conflict came to a close.

Many within the US Government and elsewhere would blame the media for the American failure in Vietnam, claiming that media focus on atrocities, the horrors of combat and the impact on soldiers damaged morale and eliminated support for the war at home. Unlike in older conflicts, where Allied journalism was almost universally supportive of the war effort, journalists in the Vietnam theater were often harshly critical of the US military, and painted a very bleak picture of the war. In an era where the media was already playing a significant role in domestic events such as the Civil Rights Movement, war correspondence in Vietnam would have a major impact on the American political scene. Some have argued that the conduct of war correspondents in Vietnam is to blame for the tightening of restrictions on journalists by the US in wars that followed, including the Persian Gulf war and the conflicts in Iraq and Afghanistan.

During the Vietnam War, UPI correspondent Joseph Galloway was present at the battle of the Ia Drang. The U.S. Army awarded him the Bronze Star for his actions during the battle, a rare event for a journalist. Along with Gen. Hal Moore, who commanded U.S. forces in the battle, Galloway subsequently wrote about his experiences in the book, We Were Soldiers Once ... and Young: Ia Drang - The Battle That Changed the War in Vietnam.

=== Gulf War ===
The role of war correspondents in the Gulf War would prove to be quite different from their role in Vietnam. The Pentagon blamed the media for the loss of the Vietnam war, and prominent military leaders did not believe the United States could sustain a prolonged and heavily televised war. As a result, numerous restrictions were placed on the activities of correspondents covering the war in the Gulf. Journalists allowed to accompany the troops were organized into "pools", where small groups were escorted into combat zones by US troops and allowed to share their findings later. Those who attempted to strike out on their own and operate outside the pool system claim to have found themselves obstructed directly or indirectly by the military, with passport visas revoked and photographs and notes taken by force from journalists while US forces observed.

Beyond military efforts to control the press, observers noted that press reaction to the Gulf War was markedly different from that of Vietnam. Critics claim that coverage of the war was "jingoistic" and overly favorable towards American forces, in harsh contrast to the criticism and muckraking that had characterized coverage of Vietnam. Journalists like CNN's Peter Arnett were lambasted for reporting anything that could be construed as contrary to the war effort, and commentators observed that coverage of the war in general was "saccharine" and heavily biased towards the American account.

These trends would continue into the Afghanistan and Iraq wars, where the pool model was replaced by a new system of embedded journalism.

== Books by war correspondents ==
- Tolstoy, Leo (1855). Sevastopol Sketches.
- Herr, Michael (1978). Dispatches. Knopf. OCLC 3732647. Previous ed. also available.
- Weber, Olivier (2002). Afghan Eternities. Le Chene/UNESCO (with Reza).
- Fisk, Robert (2002). The Great War for Civilisation. Fourth Estate. ISBN 1-4000-7517-3.
- Hedges, Chris (2002). War Is a Force That Gives Us Meaning. PublicAffairs. ISBN 1-58648-049-9.
- Filkins, Dexter (2008). The Forever War. Alfred A. Knopf. ISBN 9780307266392. OCLC 213407458.
- Junger, Sebastian (2010). War. Grand Central. ISBN 978-0446556224.

== See also ==
- Embedded journalism
- Milblog
- Military journalism in the United States
- Peace journalism
- Press pool

Lists

- List of war correspondents
- List of foreign correspondents in the Spanish Civil War
- List of war correspondents in World War II
- Journalists of the Balkan Wars

Works

- Breathing, a memorial sculpture
- Headline Hunters, a 1945 newsreel short about Canadian WWII war correspondents
