= Hollie McKay =

American-Australian journalist

- Born: Queensland, Australia
- Education: Pace University (BA)
- Occupation: Journalist

Hollie McKay is an Australian born journalist who formerly worked for Fox News. She is a national bureau correspondent covering national and international news from Iraq, Afghanistan, Iran, Russia, Turkey, Syria, Pakistan, Yemen, Myanmar and Ukraine.

== Early life and education ==
Hollie McKay was born in Mackay, Queensland. She attended The McDonald College in Sydney for secondary school.

In 2000, she published a novel entitled Sworn to Secrecy. McKay studied Communications at the University of Technology Sydney before moving to New York City in 2006 to complete her final semester at Pace University.

== Career ==
After moving to New York, McKay began working as an intern at Fox News. She later moved to Los Angeles. She reported on entertainment news with an online column and a series of television segments. From 2007 to 2013, McKay wrote an entertainment column called "Pop Tarts" for the Fox News website, and appeared on Fox News television broadcasts in a series of segments called "Hollie on Hollywood".

McKay has reported on Clint Eastwood, Anthony Bourdain, and the Ferguson unrest of 2014.

Since 2014, McKay has served as an investigative reporter and foreign correspondent for the Fox national bureau. She has reported extensively from the battlefields in Iraq, including embedded service with U.S. and Australian forces. During her investigative reporting in Iraq from 2014-2020, McKay uncovered mass sex-slavery perpetrated by ISIS, particularly against Yazidis. McKay documented dozens of witness and first hand survivor accounts to be used in later tribunals and court cases in Iraq.

In 2017, McKay returned to New York City, where she became a member of Fox Digital Studio's "original news" staff. Also in 2017, McKay reported extensively from Kabul, Afghanistan, the Panjshir Valley, and other areas of the country. In her reporting, she interviewed a wide range of Afghan government officials, members of the Afghan National Security Forces, and others, including Afghanistan's Chief Executive Abdullah Abdullah, former President Hamid Karzai, former Vice President Ahmad Zia Massoud, and Vice President Abdul Rashid Dostum (Dostum was interviewed by McKay while he was in temporary exile in Turkey). In Afghanistan, McKay investigated and reported on numerous subjects including the status of women and Women's rights in Afghanistan, Taliban attacks on Afghan forces, and how terrorists enter Afghanistan.

McKay maintains a permanent press pass to the United Nations. She met with Pakistani Ambassador Khalid Mahmood on March 19, 2018 discussion counter-terrorism in Afghanistan and Pakistan. She has reported on issues related to the Kashmir conflict.

McKay was a human rights and cultural consultant advisor to Infinity Ward for the creation of the video game Call of Duty: Modern Warfare. In that role, McKay crafted story ideas and features for their behind-the-scenes global promotional materials. McKay was featured in the 2019 documentary about the game's authentic recreation of actual battle conditions.

McKay serves on the Honorary and Advisory Board of the humanitarian NGO Emergency USA which supports healthcare to victims of war, poverty and landmines in Afghanistan, Eritrea, Iraq, Italy, Sierra Leone, Sudan and Uganda.

== Books ==
In 2021, McKay published Only Cry for the Living, a historical work that chronicles the human stories she encountered in while covering the war with ISIS between 2014 and 2019. The publisher's synopsis on Amazon.com:

Only once in a lifetime does a war so brutal erupt. A war that becomes an official genocide, causes millions to run from their homes, compels the slaughtering of thousands in the most horrific of ways, and inspires terrorist attacks to transpire across the world. That is the chilling legacy of the ISIS onslaught, and Only Cry for the Living takes a profoundly personal, unprecedented dive into one of the most brutal terrorist organizations in the world. Journalist Hollie S. McKay offers a raw, on-the-ground journey chronicling the rise of ISIS in Iraq exposing the group's vast impact and how and why it sought to wage terror on civilians in a desperate attempt to create an antiquated caliphate. The book, constructed chronologically through memos, captures the historical impact of ISIS across Iraq and Syria, as seen through the eyes of sex slave survivors, internally displaced people, persecuted minorities, humanitarian workers, religious leaders, military commanders, and even the terrorists themselves. It is not only a book that casts a haunting light on some of the darkest corners of the globe, but it is also a narrative brimming with silver-linings that illuminate the resiliency of the human spirit. It is a tragedy underscored by the heroic efforts of ordinary human beings to pick up the pieces, to fight back, and to believe that their voices matter. To truly understand the nature of terrorism and extremism to stop another ISIS from spilling needless blood we must listen to the lessons of those who lived it, fought it, joined it and rejected it.

In 2023, McKay released Afghanistan: The End of the US Footprint and the Rise of the Taliban Rule. The publisher synopsis reads,

Coffee-table style collection of premium photographs and writing*

Overnight, Afghanistan dramatically transformed. One chapter – a twenty-year epoch heralded by the attacks of September 11, the U.S. invasion and propping up an ailing government – shuttered on August 15, 2021. Another entirely new – albeit old – chapter flipped open under the stringent ruling of the Taliban.

Officially termed the Islamic Emirate of Afghanistan, it’s a government that triggers immense fear among the population, having reigned with an iron fist pre-9/11 and waged a brutal insurgency from the mountaintops that claimed the lives of hundreds of thousands of Afghans and foreigners.

Veteran war reporters – writer Hollie McKay and photographer Jake Simkin – walk you through the fall of the U.S. and the rise of the Taliban, drawing you into the minds of the new regime and into the hearts of the Afghanistan people.

“Afghanistan: The End of the U.S. Footprint and the Rise of the Taliban Rule” is a chilling bloody, yet beautiful visual expedition through one of the most magical yet wounded parcels of the planet. It is a place where poppies grow wild and men in the mountains cradle guns like children. It’s a place where kites fly high, and everyone has a war story, even though most never chose to go to war.

Welcome to Afghanistan after the cataclysmic fall. The band-aid over the bullet wound has been ripped off, and “Afghanistan” will guide you into the maze of dust, debris and delicacy the way no journalistic endeavor has done before.
