= Howard C. Hillegas =

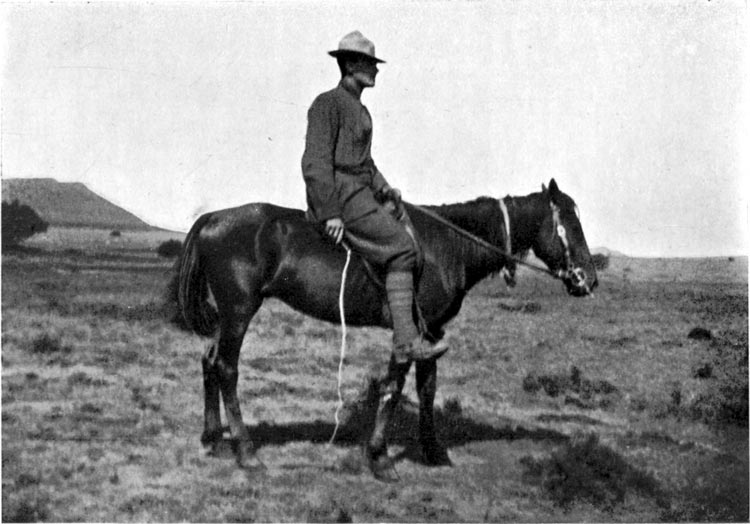
- Howard Hillegas, Second Boer War.
- Born: December 30, 1872; Pennsburg, Pennsylvania
- Died: January 29, 1918 (aged 45); New Brighton, Staten Island
- Education: Franklin & Marshall College
- Occupations: author, war correspondent, newspaper journalist, editor.

Howard Clement Hillegas (December 30, 1872 – January 29, 1918) was an American author, newspaper correspondent, and newspaper editor. Hillegas traveled to South Africa as a correspondent for the New York World to cover the Second Boer War.

== Family and education ==
Howard Clement Hillegas was born in Pennsburg, Pennsylvania on December 30, 1872. Hillegas was the son of John Gery Hillegas and Catharine (Zeigler) Hillegas. He was a descendant of Michael Hillegas who was the first Treasurer of the United States.

Hillegas graduated from Perkiomen Seminary in 1890, and Franklin & Marshall College in Lancaster, Pennsylvania in 1894. After briefly working for newspapers in Pennsylvania, in 1895 he moved to New York City to pursue a career in journalism.

Hillegas was married and had two sons and a daughter. Hillegas's daughter was born in Saratoga Springs, N.Y in February 1902.

Hillegas's youngest son, Fred Hillegas, worked as a newsperson on the radio, television, and for newspapers. Although Fred followed in his father's line of work, he did not directly know his father since he died approximately a year after Fred was born.

== Career ==
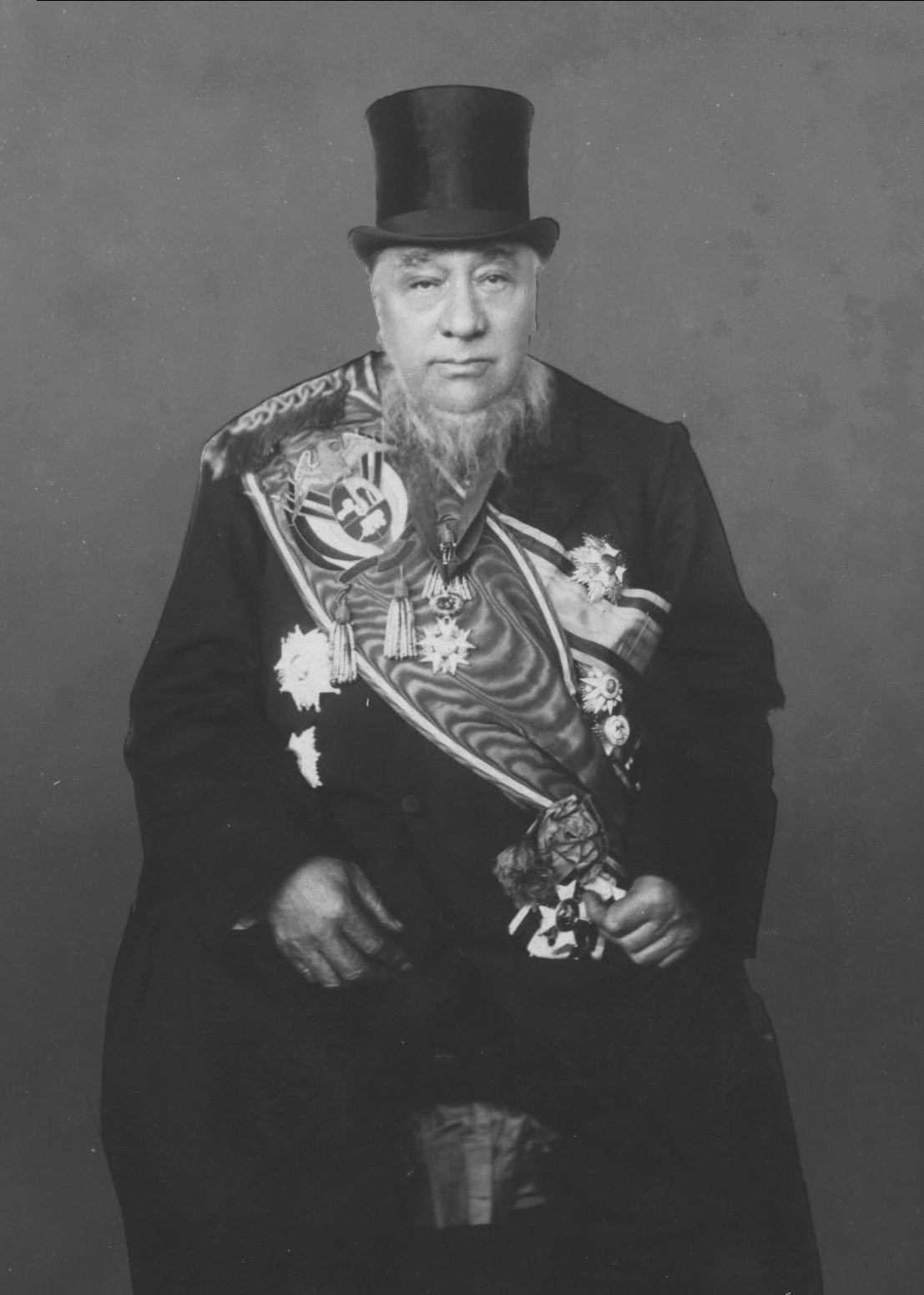
President Paul Kruger of the South African Republic at his inauguration in 1898

In 1895 Hillegas began employment as a writer for the New York World and was sent to South Africa to cover the hostilities between the Brits and the Boers. Hillegas was the first journalist to report that the fighting between Britain and the Boers had started in the Second Boer War.

After his return to the United States he authored several books about South African Wars, including Oom Paul's People and With the Boer Forces. Hillegas recounts his interview with South African Republic President Paul Kruger in the book Oom Paul's People. While in the county, Hillegas developed a friendly relationship with South African Republic statesmen. PostmasterGeneral Van Alpen, Commissioner of Mines P. Kroebler, Commissioner of War J. J. Smidt, Justice of the Peace Dillingham, and former Commandant-General Stephanne Schoeman attended the meeting between Hillegas and the President. According to Murat Halstead in Briton and Boer in South Africa, Hillegas "holds the Boers to be a nation, and his pages are full of highly colored partiality for their cause". An article written by Hillegas about President Kruger appeared in the December 1900 issue of Outing magazine.

In May 1901, The New York Times reported that Hillegas's book The Boers in War, published as With The Boer Forces in Britain, was suppressed by the British authorities.

In 1901, after returning from traveling abroad, Hillegas worked for the Saratoga Sun in Saratoga Springs, New York as an editor and publisher. Additionally, Hillegas worked on the staff of The World, The Evening World, and The New York Herald. During his time at the New York Herald, he held positions as the city editor and an editorial writer.

Hillegas resigned from the New York Herald in September 1917 and began employment at The Hotel Reporter as associate editor.

== Second Boer War ==
=== War correspondent ===
In 1895 Hillegas traveled as a special correspondent for the New York World newspaper to South Africa to cover the conflict between Britain and the Boers. During the several years that Hillegas spent in the area, he reported on the long campaign from the Boer point of view. Hillegas's account included details about the composition and organization of the Boer forces.

== Death ==
Hillegas died at his home in New Brighton, Staten Island from pneumonia on January 29, 1918. He was survived by his wife, two sons, and a daughter.
