= Marcello Palmisano =

Italian journalist (1940–1995)

Marcello Palmisano (San Michele Salentino, 17 January 1940 - Mogadishu, February 9, 1995) was an Italian journalist and reporter.

After high school, Palmisano emigrated to Switzerland, where he found work as a laborer. From Switzerland he moved to Cologne, Germany, where he graduated as a cameraman.

He then pursued this new work for the Swiss public broadcaster. Back in Italy in 1972, he started working for RAI, the Italian public broadcaster, realising several different services in war scenarios such as Cambodia, Vietnam, Afghanistan, Libya and Somalia.

He died in Mogadishu February 9, 1995, killed by Somali gunmen during an ambush while he was filming the retreat of the US army. Apparently mistaken for somebody else, as he was reporting with a colleague, Carmen Lasorella who survived, on the withdrawal of US troops. He was caught up in the country’s "banana war" for control of the banana industry, which led to clashes between rival warlords.
