= February 1962 =

Month of 1962

<<	February 1962					>>
Su	Mo	Tu	We	Th	Fr	Sa
				1	2	3
4	5	6	7	8	9	10
11	12	13	14	15	16	17
18	19	20	21	22	23	24
25	26	27	28

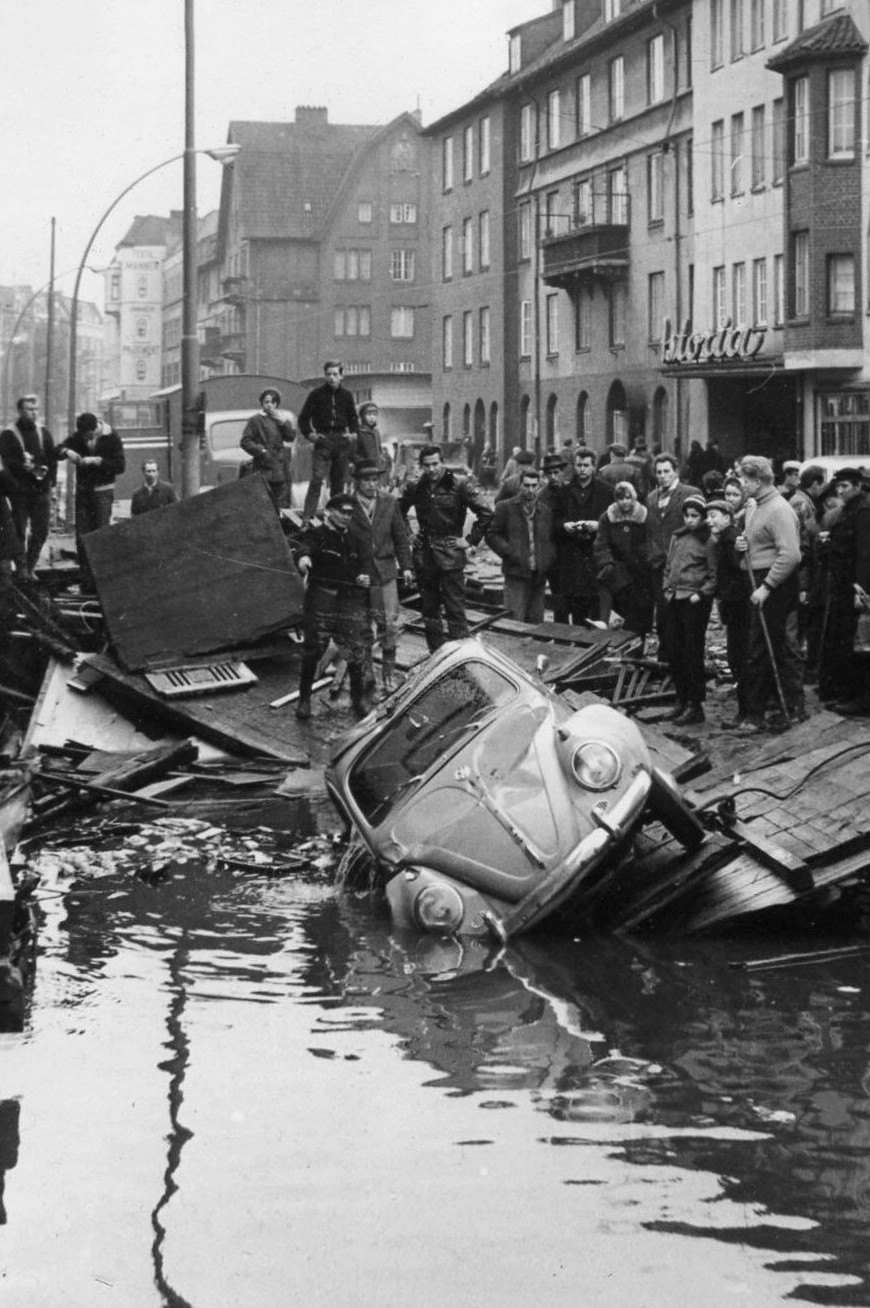
February 17, 1962: 345 West Germans die in North Sea floods

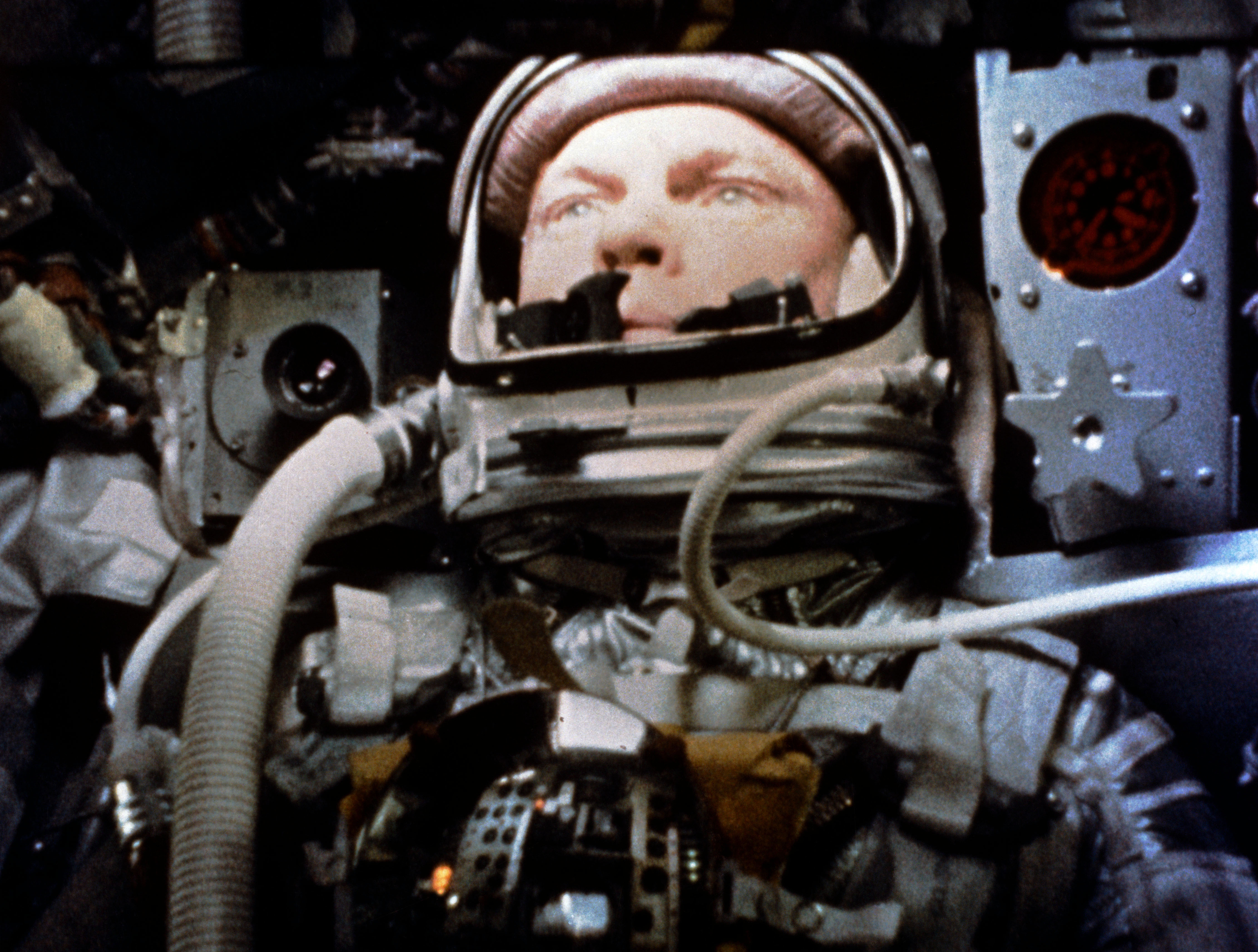
February 20, 1962: John Glenn becomes first American in orbit

The following events occurred in February 1962:

== February 1, 1962 (Thursday) ==
- U.S. President John F. Kennedy delivered "the first presidential message entirely devoted to public welfare", proposing that federal aid to the poor be extended to include job training programs and day care for children of working parents.
- NASA Headquarters announced that John Glenn's Mercury 6 mission would be launched no earlier than February 13, and that repair of the Atlas launch vehicle fuel tank leak would be completed well before that time.
- The Soviet Union and Ghana ratified a $42,000,000,000 trade pact, with Soviet engineers to assist in the construction of new industries and railroad lines in the West African nation.
- Born: Takashi Murakami, Japanese contemporary artist; in Tokyo
- Died: Westropp Bennett, 95, Irish politician

== February 2, 1962 (Friday) ==
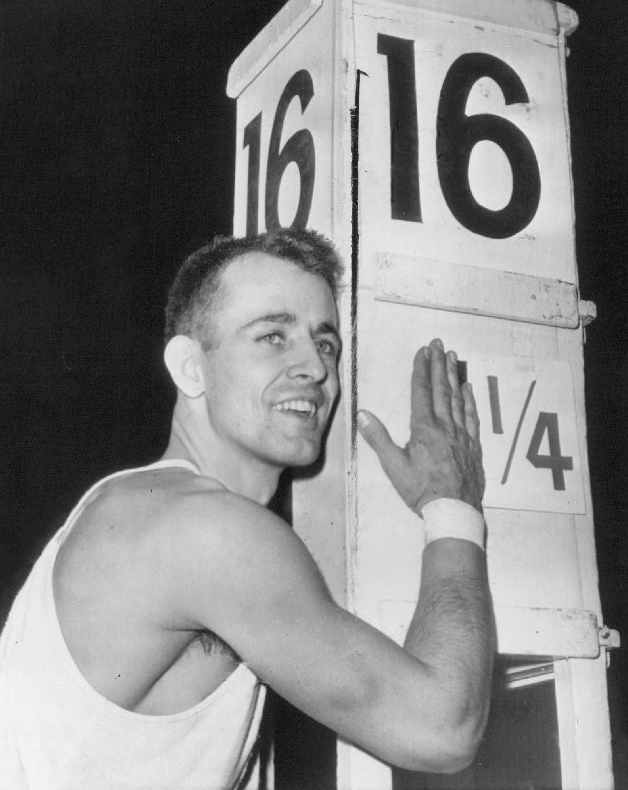
February 2, 1962: John Uelses hits new world record

- John Uelses became the first person to surpass 16 feet (4.88m) in the pole vault, clearing the mark by 0.25 inches (6.4 mm) at the Millrose Games in New York City. Uelses was assisted by use of a pole made of fiberglass. Prior to 1930, existing techniques limited the maximum height of vaulting to 14 feet (4.3 m). After Cornelius Warmerdam cleared 15 feet (4.6 m) in 1942, the 16-foot (4.9 m) barrier had been pursued for more than twenty years.
- Three U.S. Air Force officers were killed when their Fairchild C-123 Provider became the first USAF plane to be lost in Vietnam, as the U.S. carried out Operation Ranch Hand. The cause of the crash was not determined, although the concern, that it was shot down by Communist insurgents, led to orders that the defoliant spraying aircraft receive a fighter escort.
- The Soviet Union conducted its very first underground nuclear test. Previously, the Soviets had conducted all of their atomic and hydrogen bomb explosions in the atmosphere, including more than fifty since ending a moratorium on testing.
- Pope John XXIII announced the date for "Vatican II", the first worldwide conclave of the Roman Catholic Church in almost 100 years, to begin in Rome on October 11.
- The last underground shift was worked at the colliery in Radcliffe, Northumberland, England.
- Died: Alexander Lion, 91, co-founder of the German scout movement

== February 3, 1962 (Saturday) ==
- At 7:05 a.m. Indian Standard Time (0135 UTC), a "doomsday period" (as predicted by Hindu astrologers) began. It was reported that the astrologers had predicted that on Saturday, Sunday and Monday, the earth would be "bathed in the blood of thousands of kings" because of the alignment of six planets, the Earth, the Sun and the Moon. In Britain, Aetherius Society director Keith Robertson spent the next day awaiting disaster, along with many of the society's members. He had forecast that "very soon the world will do a 'big flip' when the poles will change places with the equator... 75 percent of the world's population will be killed", but the alignment and eclipse ended without any notable disaster.
- The United States embargo against Cuba was announced by President Kennedy, prohibiting "the importation into the United States of all goods of Cuban origin and all goods imported from or through Cuba". Presidential Proclamation 3447 was made pursuant to the Foreign Assistance Act of 1961, "effective 12:01 a.m., Eastern Standard Time, February 7, 1962".
- American wrestlers Luther Lindsay & Ricky Waldo defeated Toyonobori & Rikidōzan in Tokyo to win the All Asia Tag Team Championship.
- Born: Michelle Maenza, last victim of the Alphabet murders (d. 1973); in Rochester, New York

== February 4, 1962 (Sunday) ==
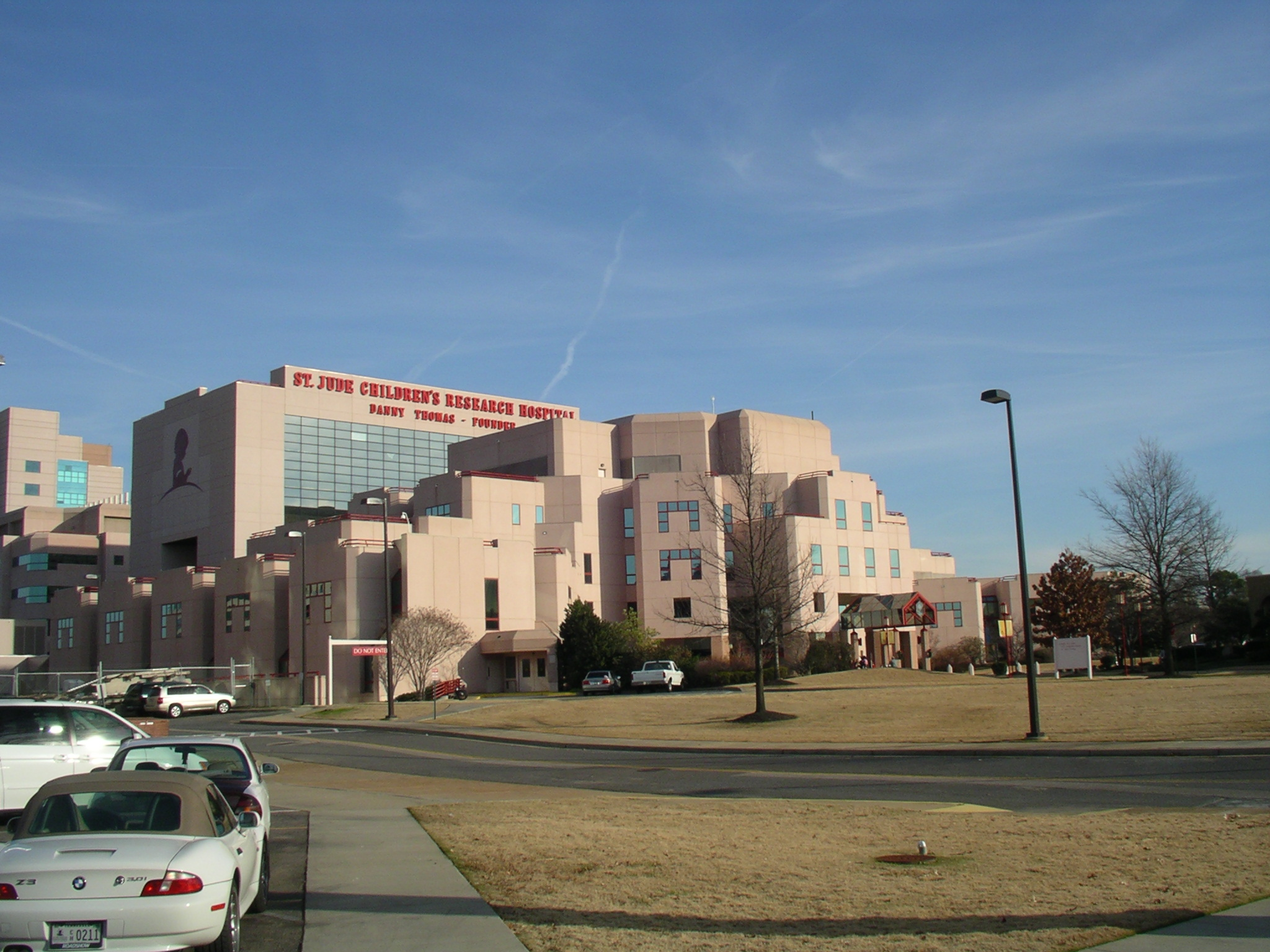
February 4, 1962: St. Jude Hospital established

- The St. Jude Children's Research Hospital opened in Memphis, Tennessee. American comedian Danny Thomas, the hospital's founder, told a crowd of 9,000 that "If I were to die this minute, I would know why I was born... Anyone may dream, but few have realized a dream as gargantuan as this one." Thomas said that he had made a vow in 1937, when he was unemployed and penniless, that he would build a shrine to Saint Jude Thaddaeus (patron saint of the lost and helpless) "if I made good". After becoming successful, he began raising funds in 1951. Fifty years later, the hospital was treating 7,800 children per year at no cost, and funding cancer research worldwide.
- The Sunday Times became the first paper in the United Kingdom to print a colour supplement. At the time that the Colour Section was introduced, such supplements "were already commonplace in North America".
- Gnostic Philosopher Samael Aun Weor declared February 4, 1962, to be the beginning of the "Age of Aquarius", heralded by the alignment of the first six planets, the Sun, the Moon, and the constellation Aquarius.
- Born: Clint Black, American country music singer; in Long Branch, New Jersey
- Died: Jacob Kramer, 69, UK-based Ukrainian painter

== February 5, 1962 (Monday) ==
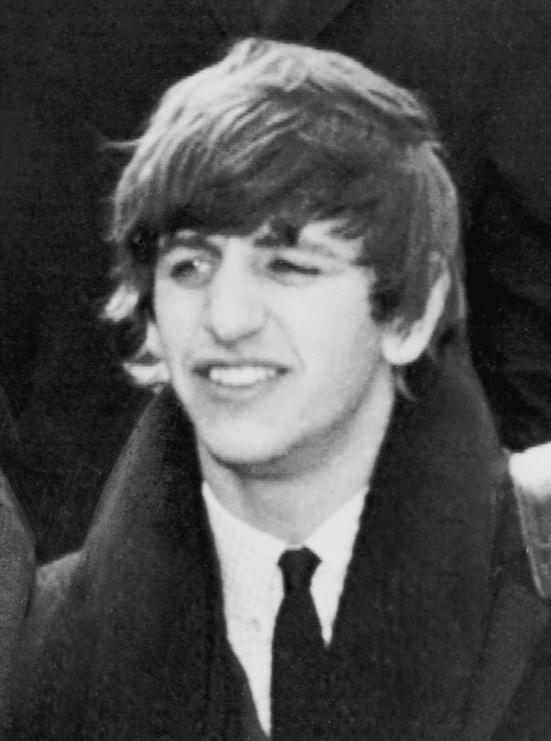
Starr

- Hours before the Beatles were scheduled to play at the Cavern Club, drummer Pete Best told his fellow musicians that he was ill and would be unable to appear. Determined not to cancel the show, the group called around for a replacement and Ringo Starr, whose group had the day off, appeared in Best's place.
- During a solar eclipse, an extremely rare grand conjunction of the classical planets occurred, for the first time since 1821. It included all 5 of the naked-eye planets plus the Sun and Moon), all of them within 16° of one another on the ecliptic. Saturn, Jupiter, Mars and Venus were on one side of the Sun, while Mercury and Earth were on the opposite side. When the Moon crossed between the Earth and the Sun, the eclipse was visible over India, where predictions of the world's end had been made.
- According to famous psychic Jeane Dixon, a child was born "somewhere in the Middle East", who would "revolutionize the world and eventually unite all warring creeds and sects into one all-embracing faiths", and who would bring peace on Earth by 1999. The prediction, which did not come true as scheduled, was published in A Gift of Prophecy, the 1965 biography of Dixon by Ruth Montgomery.
- French President Charles de Gaulle informed the nation that he was negotiating with the FLN for the independence of Algeria, conditional on a guarantee of the rights of "the minority of European origin in Algerian activities", and "an effective association" between Algeria and France.
- In the Five Nations rugby union championship, England defeated Ireland 16–0 at Twickenham. Willie John McBride made his international debut in the match.
- Born: Jennifer Jason Leigh, American actress and daughter of actor Vic Morrow and screenwriter Barbara Turner; as Jennifer Leigh Morrow in Hollywood
- Died: Jacques Ibert, 71, French composer

== February 6, 1962 (Tuesday) ==
- The Warner Brothers studio outbid MGM for the movie rights to produce the Broadway hit musical, My Fair Lady, for the unprecedented price of USD$5,500,000. The deal included an agreement to pay the play's owners 47.5% of any gross revenues over $20,000,000 and a 5% of the distributors' gross to the estate of George Bernard Shaw, upon whose play Pygmalion, the Lerner & Loewe musical had been based. The bid was more than twice the old record, $2,270,000 paid by 20th Century Fox in 1958 for the rights to South Pacific.
- Spain selected its entry for the Eurovision Song Contest 1962; the winner was Víctor Balaguer with the song "Llámame", selected by representatives of regional radio stations.
- The city of Memphis, Tennessee, ordered the desegregation of its lunch counters, formerly limited to white customers only.
- Negotiations between U.S. Steel and the United States Department of Commerce began.
- Born: Axl Rose, American rock musician and lead vocalist for Guns N' Roses; as William Bruce Rose Jr. in Lafayette, Indiana
- Died: Candido Portinari, 58, Brazilian painter, died of lead poisoning from the paints he used.

== February 7, 1962 (Wednesday) ==
- The United States Air Force announced that in the first 15 years of its Project Blue Book investigation of U.F.O. sightings, there was no evidence that any of the 7,369 unidentified flying object reports indicated a threat to national security, any technological advances "beyond the range of our present day scientific knowledge", and no sign of "extraterrestrial vehicles under intelligent controls".
- Sam Snead won the Royal Poinciana Plaza Invitational, a tournament sponsored by the Ladies Professional Golf Association, where he was the lone man competing against 14 women pros. Snead, who had lost the tournament the year before to Louise Suggs, finished five strokes ahead of Mary Kathryn "Mickey" Wright. Snead is the only man to ever win an official LPGA Tour event.
- The United States government ban against all U.S.-related Cuban imports (and nearly all exports) went into effect at one minute after midnight. The next day, the Supreme Soviet of the USSR approved a $133 million program of military aid to Cuba, after having delayed action on it for four months.
- A coal mine explosion in Saarland, West Germany, killed 299 people. The blast occurred at the coal mine, located near Völklingen, at around 9:00 a.m.
- Born: Garth Brooks, American country singer and songwriter; in Tulsa, Oklahoma

== February 8, 1962 (Thursday) ==
- Nine members of the Confédération Générale du Travail trade union were crushed to death after police chased a crowd down into the gates that closed off the subway station, in an event later called the "Charonne massacre".The incident began as a demonstration against the Organisation armée secrète (OAS), called for by the PCF (Communist Party), was repressed at the Charonne metro station.
- The United States and the United Kingdom announced an agreement between the two nations to allow the U.S. to test nuclear weapons at Christmas Island, a British possession in the Pacific Ocean.
- The British government announced that it would grant independence to Jamaica effective August 6, 1962.
- Born: Malorie Blackman, English author of Barbadian parentage; in Clapham, London

== February 9, 1962 (Friday) ==
- The Taiwan Stock Exchange began trading, with shares of 18 companies available for purchase and sale. Within 40 years, the number had increased to 584.
- Spain requested admission to the European Economic Community. Its membership would not be approved until 1986.

== February 10, 1962 (Saturday) ==
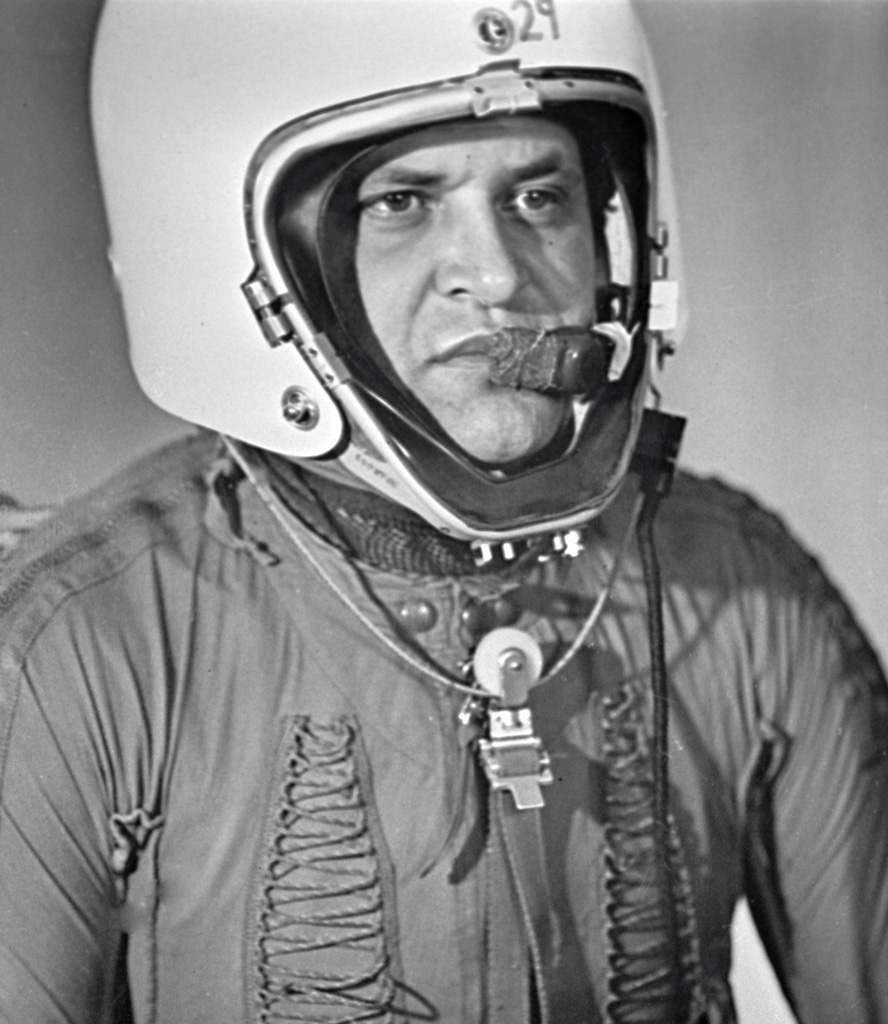
Powers

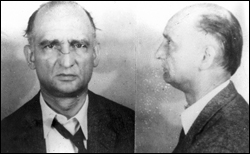
Abel

- At 8:52 a.m. local time, captured American spy pilot Francis Gary Powers was exchanged for captured Soviet spy Rudolf Abel in Berlin, at the Glienicke Bridge between Wannsee and Potsdam. Powers had been shot down over Russia on May 1, 1960 while flying a U-2 spyplane. Abel had been arrested in New York on June 21, 1957. Frederic L. Pryor, a 28-year-old American student who had been arrested in East Berlin on August 25, was released as part of the deal as well.
- Born: Cliff Burton, American bass guitarist for Metallica; in Castro Valley, California (died in bus crash, 1986)

== February 11, 1962 (Sunday) ==
- Negotiations, between the government of France and Algerian independence leaders, opened at Les Rousses, a remote village in the French Alps, leading to a preliminary agreement on a transitional government.
- Comedian June Carter became a permanent part of the tour of country music singer Johnny Cash, starting with a stop at Des Moines. The two would marry in 1968.
- The UK selected its entry for the 1962 Eurovision Song Contest from a shortlist of 12. The winner was "Ring-a-ding Girl" sung by Ronnie Carroll.
- Born:
  - Tammy Baldwin, the first openly LGBT person elected to the United States Congress and the first female U.S. Representative from Wisconsin; in Madison, Wisconsin
  - Sheryl Crow, American singer-songwriter known for "All I Wanna Do", "Everyday Is a Winding Road" and "Soak Up the Sun"; in Kennett, Missouri

== February 12, 1962 (Monday) ==
- The body of British aviator Bill Lancaster was discovered almost 29 years after he had disappeared over the Sahara in the Southern Cross Minor. Lancaster had last been seen on April 12, 1933, when he took off from Reggane in French Algeria.
- The largest air search effort ever made in New Zealand commenced with the disappearance of five people on a scenic flight from Christchurch to Milford Sound. No trace of the aircraft, a Dragonfly ZK-AFB, has ever been found.
- Communist China created its first military aerobatics team of nine Shenyang J-5 airplanes of the People's Liberation Army Air Force, now referred to as the "August 1 Team" in honor of the founding of the PLAAF.
- Six members of the Committee of 100 of the Campaign for Nuclear Disarmament were found guilty of a breach of the Official Secrets Act.
- Spike Milligan's and John Antrobus's play, The Bed-Sitting Room, premiered at the Marlowe Theatre in Canterbury.

== February 13, 1962 (Tuesday) ==
- A crowd of at least 150,000 people, and perhaps as many as 500,000 marched in Paris in the first massive protest against the continuing Algerian War, which had gone into its eighth year. The occasion was the funeral ceremony for five of the nine people who had been killed by police in the Charonne metro station the previous Thursday. With many of the participants walking off of their jobs to protest, business in Paris and much of France was brought to a halt.
- Born: May Sweet, Myanmar singer and actress; in Rangoon, Burma (now Yangon, Myanmar)
- Died: Hugh Dalton, 74, Welsh politician and former British Chancellor of the Exchequer

== February 14, 1962 (Wednesday) ==
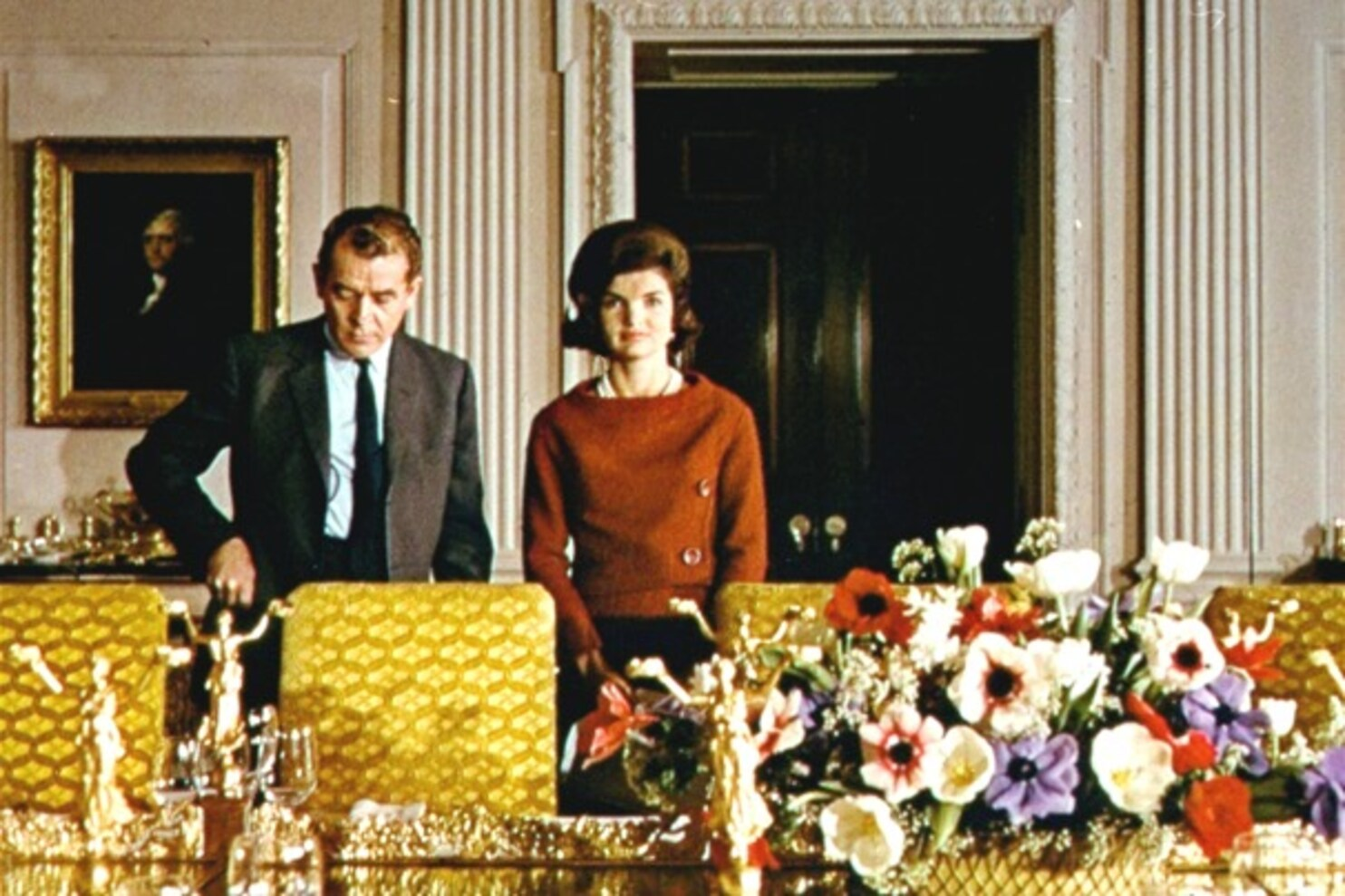
February 14, 1962: Jackie Kennedy gives White House tour on TV

- A Tour of the White House with Mrs. John F. Kennedy, produced by CBS News and hosted by American First Lady Jacqueline Kennedy and CBS reporter Charles Collingwood, was broadcast on television by CBS and on NBC at 10:00 p.m. Eastern time. Attracting 46,000,000 TV viewers, or three out of every four households in America, it was the highest rated television program up to that time. ABC television, which did not wish to share the $100,000 production cost for the commercial-free special, showed Naked City instead, and ran the program the following Sunday.
- Unfavorable weather conditions caused John Glenn's space launch to be postponed.

== February 15, 1962 (Thursday) ==
- The Soviet Union restored the death penalty, for rape and for "attacks on police and public order volunteers". Capital punishment had been officially abolished nationwide on May 26, 1947, but gradually reintroduced for various crimes beginning in 1950.
- Urho Kekkonen was re-elected president of Finland. Kekkonen received 199 of 300 electoral votes, after winning the popular vote on January 15. Communist Party candidate was second, with 62 votes, and Social Democratic candidate Rafael Paasio got 37.
- In Elisabethville (now Lubumbashi), the legislature for the Republic of Katanga voted to ratify President Moise Tshombe's declaration that the breakaway state should end its secession and return to the Republic of the Congo.
- The Space Systems Division of the U.S. Air Force issued a Technical Operating Plan to Aerospace Corporation for support of the Gemini Launch Vehicle Program. Under a contract signed on March 15, Aerospace was responsible for general systems engineering and technical direction of the development of the launch vehicle and its associated subsystems.
- Born:
  - Milo Đukanović, first President of Montenegro from 1998 to 2002, and Prime Minister of Montenegro on multiple occasions between 1991 and 2010; in Nikšić, SR Montenegro, Yugoslavia
  - June Marina Oswald, daughter of Lee Harvey Oswald and Marina Oswald; in Minsk
- Died: Menen Asfaw, 72, wife of Emperor Haile Selassie of Ethiopia

== February 16, 1962 (Friday) ==
- Voting in India's national parliamentary election commenced, with 210 million voters going to the polls. There were 14,744 candidates for the 494 seats in the Lok Sabha and the 2,930 seats in the legislatures of 13 Indian states. The final result was that 119,904,284 eligible voters participated, and the Indian National Congress, led by Prime Minister Jawaharlal Nehru, won 361 (or about 73%) of the seats. The Communist Party of India was a distant second with 29 seats (6%).
- U.S. President Kennedy issued nine Executive Orders, numbered 10095 to 11105, delegating "emergency preparedness functions" for various federal agencies and departments, to be implemented in the event of a national emergency that required a declaration of martial law.
- Walter C. Williams, Project Mercury Operations Director, announced that because of weather conditions February 20 would be the earliest date that the Mercury-Atlas 6 mission could be launched.
- Rioters in British Guiana (now Guyana) set fire to much of the capital city of Georgetown, as Guianans of African descent attacked those of Indian descent. British troops were sent in to restore order.

== February 17, 1962 (Saturday) ==
- After being rejected by both her lover, Richard Burton, and her husband, Eddie Fisher, actress Elizabeth Taylor attempted suicide by taking an overdose of Seconal sleeping pills. She was saved after being rushed to the Salvator Mundi Hospital in Rome, where she and Burton were filming Cleopatra. The 20th Century Fox studio invented a cover story that Taylor had become seriously ill from food poisoning.
- U.S. Secretary of Defense Robert S. McNamara outlined the doctrine of flexible response, the nuclear strategy of the Kennedy administration, in an address to the American Bar Foundation in Chicago. The plan called for building a large enough nuclear arsenal that the United States would have the ability to launch a second strike of nuclear missiles against the Soviets even after an initial exchange of destruction.
- Floods killed 345 people in West Germany and left 500,000 people homeless, as hurricane-force winds and heavy rains swept across West Germany's North Sea coast and sent the waters flooding over the seawall. Most of the casualties were in Hamburg where 281 died when the Elbe River overflowed."
- Richard Helms replaced Richard M. Bissell, Jr., as Director of the National Clandestine Service, a department of the U.S. Central Intelligence Agency. Helms would, in 1966, become the Director of Central Intelligence.
- Born:
  - Lou Diamond Phillips, American actor and director; as Lou Diamond Upchurch at the U.S. Naval Base Subic Bay in Zambales, Philippines
  - David McComb, Australian rock musician for The Triffids (d. 1999); in Perth
- Died:
  - Joseph Kearns, 55, an American actor who portrayed "Mr. Wilson" on the Dennis the Menace TV series, died after collapsing from a cerebral hemorrhage the previous Sunday. Ironically, the plot for that Sunday evening's episode, "Where There's a Will", dealt with Kearns's character convinced that he had only a short time to live.
  - Bruno Walter, 85, German orchestral conductor

== February 18, 1962 (Sunday) ==
- Two pilots of the French Air Force, described as "renegades", defied orders, broke away from a routine mission over French Algeria, flew their planes across the border into Morocco, and then attacked a rebel camp in the city of Oujda with rockets and machine gun fire. The two, believed to be members of the Organisation armée secrète, then flew their planes to Saïda, Algeria, landed, and deserted.
- At the 1962 NHRA Winternationals, Carol Cox became the first woman allowed to race at a National Hot Rod Association (NHRA) event in the United States. She won one of the featured drag race competitions, the Super Stock, automatic transmission (S/SA) event.

== February 19, 1962 (Monday) ==
- Rock musician Chuck Berry reported to the Federal Penitentiary in Terre Haute, Indiana, after his conviction for violating the Mann Act (in 1959) was affirmed. After serving 20 months of his three-year sentence, he would be released on October 18, 1963, and revive his career.
- AiResearch Manufacturing Company, a division of the Garrett Corporation, received a $15 million subcontract to manufacture the environmental control system (ECS) for the Gemini spacecraft. The Gemini ECS consisted of suit, cabin, and coolant circuits, and an oxygen supply, all designed to be manually controlled whenever possible during all phases of flight. Primary functions of the ECS were controlling suit and cabin atmosphere, controlling suit and equipment temperatures, and providing drinking water for the crew and storage or disposal of waste water.
- Howard W. Tindall, Jr. of NASA's Flight Operations Division requested consolidation of all Project Gemini computer programming and operation at Manned Spacecraft Center in Houston, with no further Gemini work to be done at the Goddard Space Flight Center (which handled the Mercury program) in Greenbelt, Maryland. Tindall also recommended a single-source contract with International Business Machines Corporation to equip the facility.
- The initial coordination meeting between Gemini Project Office and McDonnell Aircraft was held at Manned Spacecraft Center (MSC) in Houston. After five introduction sessions, regular three-day-a-week business meetings would begin on March 5.
- CIA Director John A. McCone established the Directorate of Science & Technology as the Directorate of Research, part of McCone's reorganization of the Central Intelligence Agency.
- The town of Houghton, Iowa, United States, was incorporated.
- A penumbral lunar eclipse took place.
- Born:
  - Hana Mandlíková, Czech-born Australian tennis player, winner of Australian Open (1980 and 1987), French Open (1981) and U.S. Open singles (1985) and doubles (1989); in Prague, Czechoslovakia
  - Germán Vargas Lleras, 10th Vice President of Colombia from 2014 to 2017; in Bogotá
- Died: Edouard Dethier, 76, Belgian violinist and teacher

== February 20, 1962 (Tuesday) ==
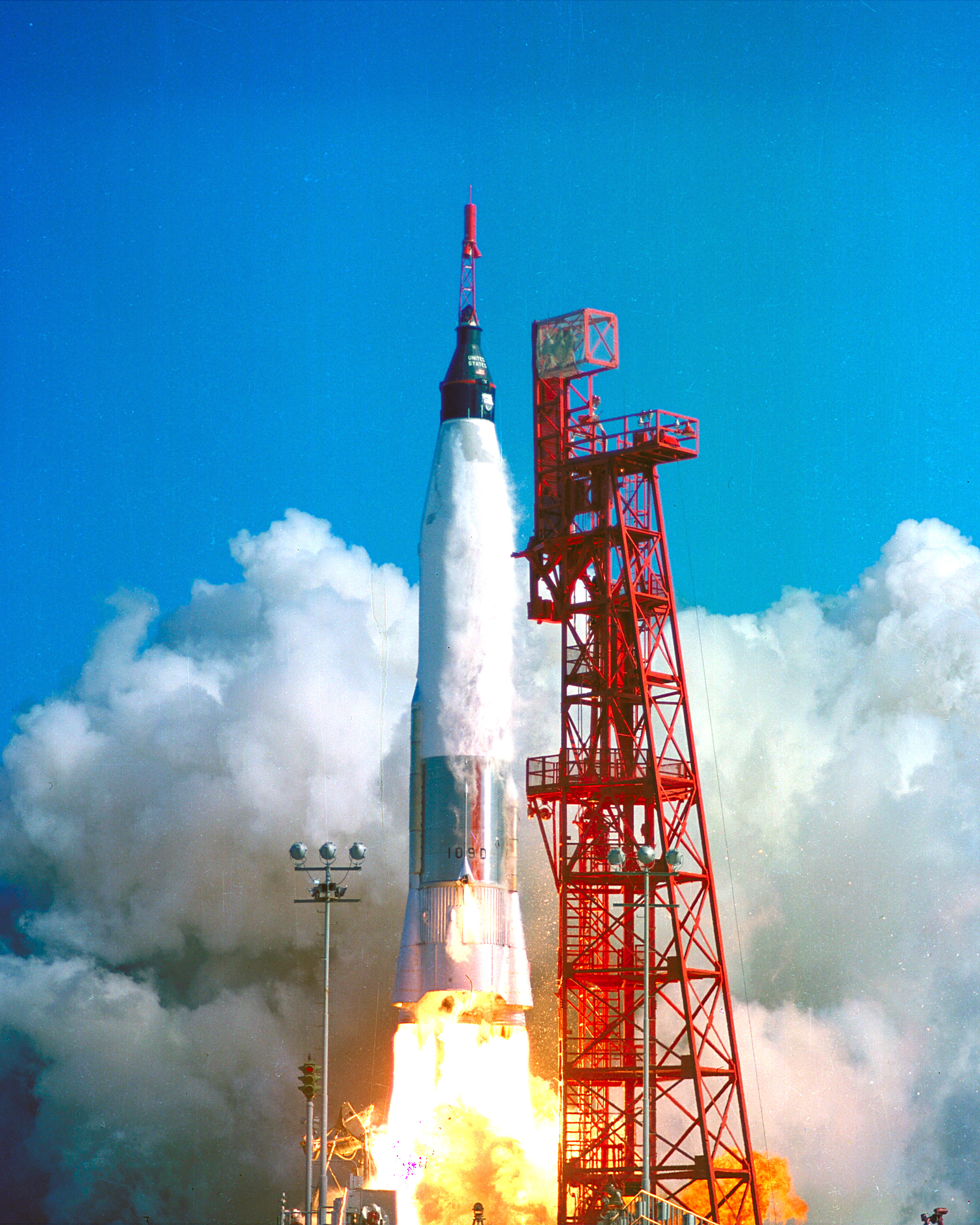
February 20, 1962: Launch of Friendship 7

- John Glenn became the first U.S. astronaut to be launched into orbit, as Mercury 6 lifted off from Cape Canaveral at 9:47 a.m. local time (1447 UTC) and attained orbit at 9:59 (1459 UTC). An estimated 60 million persons viewed the launch on live television. After three circuits of the Earth, Glenn's spacecraft left orbit at 2:20 p.m. (1920 UTC), landed in the Atlantic Ocean at 2:43 (1943 UTC) about 800 miles (1,300 km) southeast of Bermuda, and was recovered by the destroyer USS Noa (DD-841) at 3:04 (2004 UTC), after being in the water for 21 minutes. Glenn would return to outer space more than 35 years later, on October 29, 1998, at the age of 77, becoming the oldest human to orbit the Earth.
- During the flight two major problems were encountered. A yaw attitude control jet apparently clogged, forcing Glenn to abandon the automatic control system and to use the manual "fly-by-wire" controls, and a faulty switch in the heat shield circuit indicated, incorrectly, that the clamp holding the shield had been prematurely released. During reentry, however, the retropack was not jettisoned but retained as a safety measure to hold the heat shield in place in the event it had loosened.
- The basic objectives of Project Mercury had been to place a human being into Earth orbit, to observe his reactions to space environment, and to safely return him to Earth to a point where he could be readily found. While there had been concern before the flight about the psychological effects of prolonged weightlessness, Glenn was neither harmed nor debilitated, and reported that zero gravity conditions were handy in performing his tasks. He said he felt exhilarated during his four and a half hours of weightlessness. One of the interesting sidelights of the Glenn flight was his report of "fire flies" when he entered the sunrise portion of an orbit. For several months, the phenomenon remained a mystery, until the May 24 Mercury 7 mission when Scott Carpenter accidentally tapped the spacecraft wall with his hand, releasing many of the so-called "fire flies." The source was determined to be frost from the reaction control jets.
- Five days after making both rape and attacks on police subject to capital punishment, the Soviet Union restored the death penalty for persons convicted of accepting bribes. Females were exempt from the death penalty under any circumstances, as were men who had reached the age of 60 by the time of their sentencing.

== February 21, 1962 (Wednesday) ==
- Margot Fonteyn and Rudolf Nureyev first danced together, in a Royal Ballet performance of Giselle at Covent Garden in London, creating one of the greatest partnerships in the history of dance. Nureyev had defected from the USSR almost eight months earlier on June 16, 1961. He and Fonteyn received 23 curtain calls from the audience.
- On the day after John Glenn's historic flight, Soviet Premier Khrushchev sent a telegram to U.S. President Kennedy, proposing that the two nations co-operate on their space program. The first joint venture would take place in 1975.
- A metal fragment, identified by numbers stamped on it as a part of the Atlas that boosted Mercury-Atlas 6 (MA-6) into orbit, landed on a farm in South Africa after about 8 hours in orbit.
- Former Soviet Foreign Minister Dmitri Shepilov was expelled from the Soviet Communist Party, in retaliation for his role in a 1957 attempt to oust Nikita Khrushchev from power.
- The first Samos-F satellite, also referred to as a "ferret satellite" because of its purpose of monitoring Soviet missiles and seeking out information, was launched from Cape Canaveral.

== February 22, 1962 (Thursday) ==
- Pope John XXIII signed Veterum sapientia ("Ancient Wisdom") as an apostolic constitution, the highest possible papal decree. The declaration, published the next day, directed that Roman Catholic seminary students should not only be instructed on the use of the Latin language, but that lectures should be given in Latin, "a bond of unity between the Christian peoples of Europe". The Pope also prohibited priests from arguing against the use of Latin, and created an institute to create new words in Contemporary Latin to keep it apace of modern developments. In 1963, the second Vatican council would approve an order retaining Latin for specific rituals, but native languages for most other purposes.
- In Colombia, 40 train passengers were killed and 67 injured in a collision with a freight trainnear Cali.
- Martin-Baltimore submitted its initial proposal for the redesign of the Gemini rocket.
- Pope John XXIII made Sant'Atanasio in Rome a titular church as a seat for Cardinals.
- Born: Steve Irwin, Australian naturalist and broadcaster; in Essendon, Victoria (killed by stingray, 2006)

== February 23, 1962 (Friday) ==
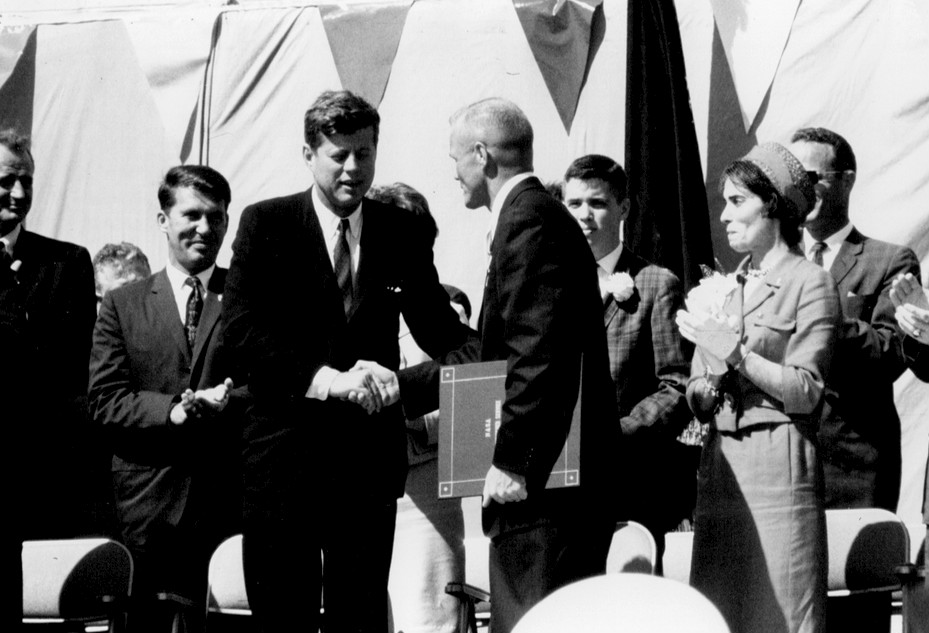
February 23, 1962: John Glenn receives the NASA Distinguished Service Medal from President Kennedy

- Astronaut John Glenn arrived in Cape Canaveral to a hero's welcome and was reunited with his family for the first time since before going into space. U.S. President John F. Kennedy, for whom Cape Canaveral would be renamed temporarily during the 1960s and early 1970s, greeted Glenn and personally awarded the NASA Distinguished Service Medal to Glenn and Robert R. Gilruth. Kennedy praised Glenn for "professional skill, unflinching courage and extraordinary ability to perform a most difficult task under physical stress." It was then that Glenn revealed in an interview that the heat shield on his capsule began to break up upon re-entry, the loss of which would have been fatal. Glenn calmly said, "it could have been a bad day for everybody".
- Born: Lise Haavik, Norwegian singer; in Narvik
- Died: James Halliday McDunnough, 84, Canadian entomologist who identified almost 1,500 different species of butterflies in North America

== February 24, 1962 (Saturday) ==
- The United States government began its first telephone and television transmissions via satellite, bouncing signals off Echo 1, which had been launched on August 12, 1960.

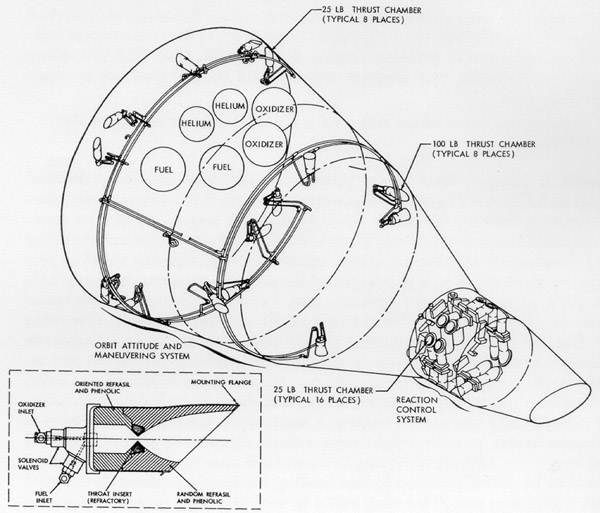
General arrangement of liquid rocket systems (OAMS and RCS) in the Gemini spacecraft

- North American Aviation's Rocketdyne Division was awarded a $32 million subcontract to build two separate liquid propulsion systems for the Gemini spacecraft, the orbit attitude and maneuvering system (OAMS) and the reentry control system (RCS).
- Born: Michelle Shocked (stage name for Karen Michelle Johnston), American singer-songwriter; in Dallas
- Died:
  - Henrik Sørensen, 80, Norwegian expressionist painter
  - Hu Shih, 70, Chinese philosopher

== February 25, 1962 (Sunday) ==
- The Judy Garland Show, a one-off special, appeared on the United States TV channel CBS and received a 49.5 rating, the highest rating CBS had for a variety show to that time. The success of the special led to a weekly series in 1963, which CBS cancelled after a year because of low ratings.
- Inspection of Atlas launch vehicle 107-D, designated for the May 24 Mercury 7 mission of Scott Carpenter, was conducted at the Convair Division of General Dynamics in San Diego.
- Born: Birgit Fischer, German kayaker; Olympic gold medalist in 1980 and 1988, and world champion in 1978–79, 1981–83, 1985 and 1987 for East Germany; Olympic gold medalist in 1992, 1996, 2000 and 2004 and world champion in 1993–95, 1997–98 for united Germany; in Brandenburg an der Havel

== February 26, 1962 (Monday) ==
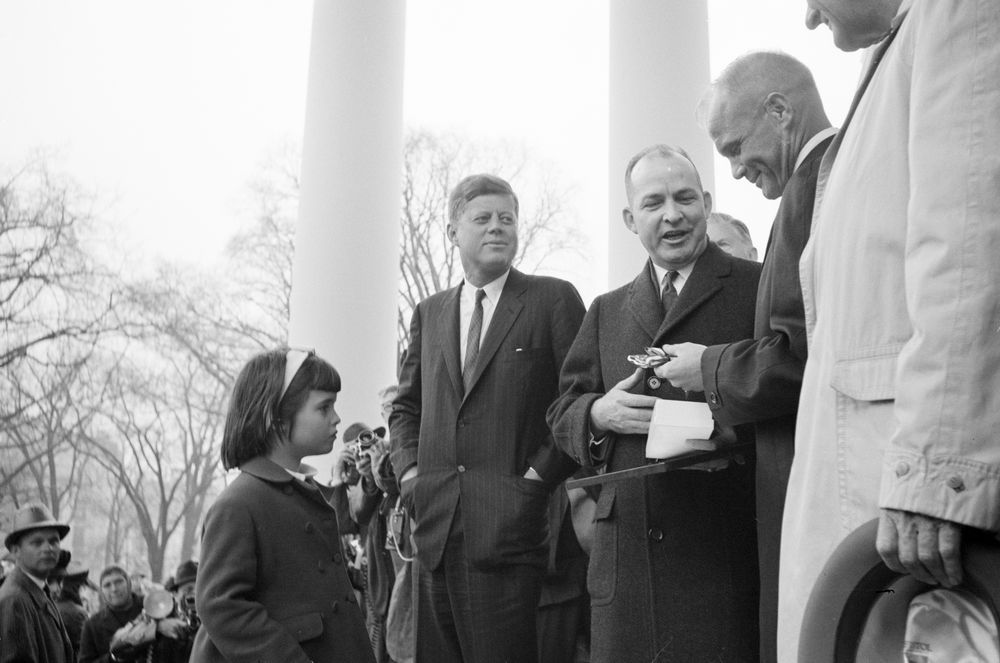
February 26, 1962: John Glenn receives key to the city in Washington, D.C., as six-year-old Maria Shriver looks on

- John Glenn Day in Washington, D.C., featured the reception of the astronaut at the White House, a parade, and his address to a joint session of the United States Congress.
- The Irish Republican Army officially called off its five-year Border Campaign in Northern Ireland. In press releases dropped off at newspapers there as well as in Ireland, the IRA publicity bureau wrote, "The Leadership of the Resistance Movement has ordered the termination of 'The Campaign of Resistance to British Occupation'... all arms and other materials have been dumped and all full-time active service volunteers have been withdrawn." With the exception of a series of 17 bank robberies to finance the organization, the IRA violence halted until 1969.
- Born: Etienne Ys, Prime Minister of the Netherlands Antilles from 2002 to 2003 and again from 2004 to 2006; in Curaçao
- Died: Chic Johnson, 70, American comedian who had been half of the popular vaudeville act of Olsen and Johnson and creator of the musical revue Hellzapoppin (musical).

== February 27, 1962 (Tuesday) ==
- Sublieutenant Nguyễn Văn Cử and Lt. Phạm Phú Quốc, two South Vietnamese members of the Republic of Vietnam Air Force, diverted from their combat mission south of Saigon and dropped bombs upon the presidential palace in an attempt to assassinate South Vietnamese President Ngô Đình Diệm. One of the 500-pound (230 kg) bombs landed in the room where the President and his advisers were but failed to detonate because it had been dropped from too low an altitude to arm itself. Quốc was arrested after being forced to land, while Cử fled to neighboring Cambodia. Both men would be reinstated to the Air Force after Diem's assassination in 1963.
- After getting word that U.S. Attorney General Robert F. Kennedy was preparing to fire him from his job as Director of the FBI, J. Edgar Hoover gave the Attorney General a memorandum of an FBI investigation of Judith Exner, noting that she had made phone calls to the private line of Robert's brother, U.S. President John F. Kennedy. Hoover remained FBI Director until his death in 1972.
- The United Kingdom's House of Commons voted 277–170 in favor of the Commonwealth Immigrants Act 1962, designed to limit the immigration into Great Britain by residents of India, Pakistan, and the West Indies.
- An explosion at the Tito Coal Mine in Banovici, in the Bosnia republic of Yugoslavia, trapped 177 miners underground. Rescuers were able to save 123 of the men, but 54 were trapped inside and died.

== February 28, 1962 (Wednesday) ==
- A group of 15 American Jupiter missiles, with nuclear warheads, became operational at the Izmir U.S. Air Force Base at Çiğli, within range to strike the Soviet Union 1,000 miles (1,600 km) away. The presence of American nuclear missiles in a nation bordering the USSR became an issue eight months later during the Cuban Missile Crisis, when Soviet nuclear missiles were brought to Cuba, within striking distance of the United States. The missiles would be withdrawn from both Turkey and Cuba following the crisis.
- Professor Claudio Sánchez-Albornoz y Menduiña of the University of Buenos Aires was given the honorary title of Prime Minister of the Spanish Republican government in Exile. He would hold the position for nine years.
- The Beatles appeared at the Cavern Club in Liverpool on a triple bill with Gerry and the Pacemakers and Johnny Sandon and the Searchers.
