= January 1962 =

Month of 1962

| << | January 1962 | | | | | >> |
| Su | Mo | Tu | We | Th | Fr | Sa |
| | 1 | 2 | 3 | 4 | 5 | 6 |
| 7 | 8 | 9 | 10 | 11 | 12 | 13 |
| 14 | 15 | 16 | 17 | 18 | 19 | 20 |
| 21 | 22 | 23 | 24 | 25 | 26 | 27 |
| 28 | 29 | 30 | 31 |

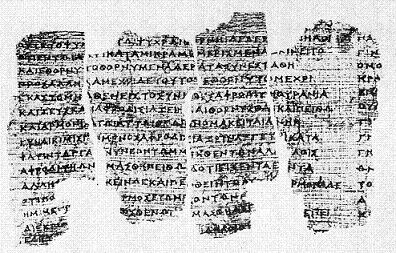
January 15, 1962: Derveni papyrus located after 23 centuries

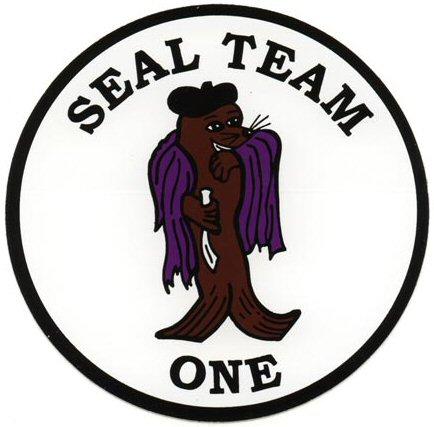
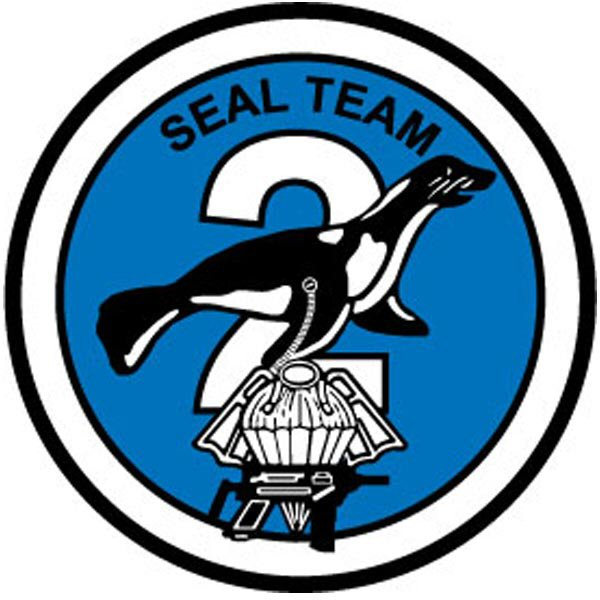
January 8, 1962: First U.S. Navy SEAL teams created

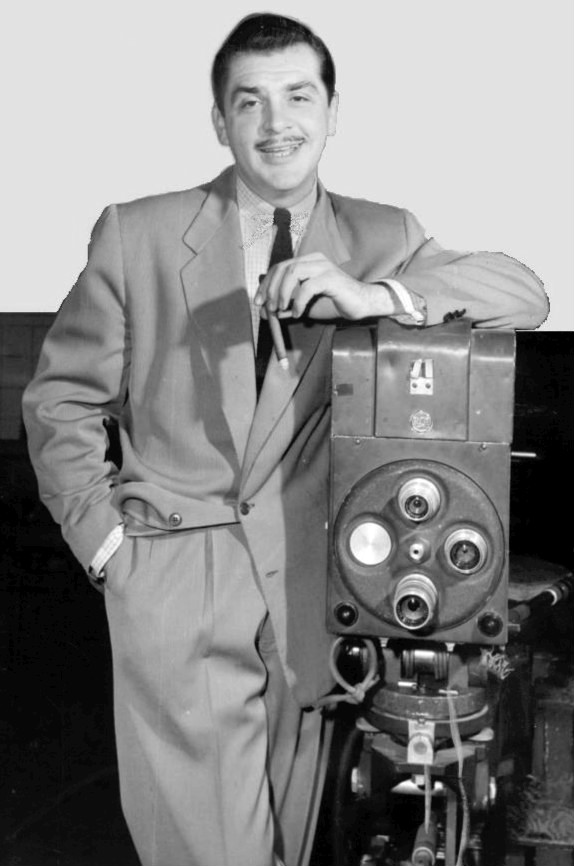
January 13, 1962: Comedian Ernie Kovacs killed in car crash

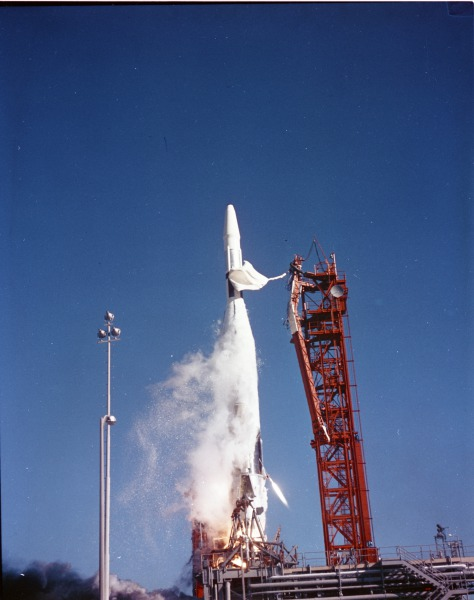
January 26, 1962: U.S. launches of Ranger 3 probe unsuccessfully toward Moon landing, probe misses by 22,000 miles.

The following events occurred in January 1962:

== January 1, 1962 (Monday) ==
The flag of Samoa

- Western Samoa (now the Kingdom of Samoa) became independent from New Zealand as a monarchy. The two fautua (advisers), Malietoa Tanumafili II and Tupua Tamasese Mea'ole, were named as the two heads of state.
- The Beatles auditioned unsuccessfully for Decca Records with John Lennon, Paul McCartney, George Harrison and, at that time, drummer Pete Best. The first song of 15 performed between 11:00 a.m. and noon was "Like Dreamers Do". The audition tape was officially released in 1982. Decca opted instead to sign the other group that auditioned that day -- Brian Poole and the Tremeloes. Both groups would have a hit recording of the song "Twist and Shout", with the Tremeloes hitting #1 in the UK and the Beatles #4 in the U.S.
- The Alabama Crimson Tide, ranked No1 in the AP and UPI polls and crowned as the national college football champion, defeated the No. 9 Arkansas Razorbacks in the Sugar Bowl, 10–3, in New Orleans.
- The People's Revolutionary Party was founded as a Marxist–Leninist political party in South Vietnam, with its leaders receiving instruction directly from the Lao Dong Party of North Vietnam.
- The Anglican Church of Australia became autocephalous, separate from the Church of England, and was headed by its own primate, the Archbishop of Brisbane, Sir Reginald Halse.
- The University of New Zealand was broken up into four universities (Otago, Canterbury, Auckland and Victoria University) and two agricultural colleges at Canterbury and Massey.
- The far-right National Fellowship Party was founded in the United Kingdom.
- Illinois became the first U.S. state to decriminalize homosexual activity.
- Died:
  - Hans von Salmuth, 73, German World War II general later convicted of war crimes at Nuremberg
  - Diego Martínez Barrio, 78, former President of the Second Spanish Republic (in 1936)

== January 2, 1962 (Tuesday) ==
- In his annual report to the NAACP, Executive Secretary Roy Wilkins praised U.S. President John F. Kennedy's "personal role" in advancing civil rights, but said that he was "sorely disappointed" by the President's failure to honor his promise to ban racial discrimination in federally assisted housing.
- Trevor Taylor won the 1962 Cape Grand Prix in South Africa, finishing 0.6 seconds ahead of Jim Clark.
- NBC launched its daytime panel game show, Your First Impression.
- Born: Iván Palazzese, Italian motorcycle racer; in Alba Adriatica (killed in accident, 1989)
- Died: Joseph Edward Woodall, 65, English recipient of the Victoria Cross

== January 3, 1962 (Wednesday) ==
- NASA's Mercury Mark II program was officially renamed "Project Gemini". The name for the second phase of the U.S. human spaceflight program, which would use a pair of astronauts in a spacecraft instead of one, had been suggested by Alex P. Nagy of NASA Headquarters based on the twin stars Castor and Pollux in the constellation Gemini, the Latin word for twins. Coincidentally, the astronomical symbol (II) for Gemini, the third constellation of the zodiac, corresponded neatly to the Mark II designation.
- A spokesman for Pope John XXIII revealed that Cuban leader Fidel Castro and several other officials had received a decree of excommunication from the Roman Catholic Church in 1961 under two sections of canon law, for impeding bishops in their work and for violence against clergymen. In September, Cuban bishop Eduardo Boza Masvidal and 135 priests had been forced to leave Cuba.
- The Manned Spacecraft Center (MSC) prepared its Statement of Work for the division of labor between NASA and the U.S. Air Force Space Systems Division (SSD), as approved in December 1961. The first purchase request was for $27,000,000 for 15 Titan launch vehicles.
- The Winemakers' Union of Graves de Vayres was founded.
- Born:
  - Jon Gibson, American contemporary Christian musician with nine No. 1 songs on the CCM charts; in San Francisco
  - Darren Daulton, American baseball player and 1992 National League RBI leader; in Arkansas City, Kansas (d. 2017)
  - Gavin Hastings, Scottish rugby union fullback with 61 caps for the Scottish national team; in Edinburgh

== January 4, 1962 (Thursday) ==
- Broadway producer David Merrick submitted a full-page advertisement to seven New York City newspapers, with the tagline "7 OUT OF 7 ARE ECSTATICALLY UNANIMOUS ABOUT SUBWAYS ARE FOR SLEEPING", his musical comedy that had opened on December 27 to poor reviews. The ad contained favorable quotes, citing the names of seven well-known theater critics. Merrick had found seven other men with the same names. Next to a photo of the other Howard Taubman was the line "One of the few great musical comedies of the last thirty years..." The New York Herald-Tribune ran the ad in its first edition before an editor spotted the hoax and alerted the other newspapers.
- The Transit Authority of New York City introduced a subway train that operated without a crew on board. The "zombie" train kept a motorman on board to deal with any problems.
- Born:
  - André Rouvoet, Dutch politician, Deputy Prime Minister of the Netherlands from 2007 to 2010; in Hilversum
  - Peter Steele, American metal musician, as Petrus Thomas Ratajczyk in Brooklyn, New York City (d. 2010)
- Died: Hans Lammers, 82, Nazi leader and Chief of the Reich Chancellery from 1933 to 1945

== January 5, 1962 (Friday) ==
- Prison inmate Clarence Gideon sent a letter, written in pencil, to the United States Supreme Court, asking them to reverse his conviction for burglary on the grounds that he had not been given the right to an attorney. The Supreme Court granted certiorari and, on March 18, 1963, issued the landmark decision of Gideon v. Wainwright, holding that the Sixth Amendment guarantee of the right to assistance of counsel required the appointment of a lawyer for any person unable to afford one.
- The Manned Spacecraft Center published its first analysis of the Gemini spacecraft schedule, adjusting launch dates for a first flight in late July or early August 1963, and with six-week launch intervals between the first three flights. Subsequent launches would occur at two-month intervals, with the last flight in late April or early May 1965. The first Agena mission targeting was scheduled for late February or early March 1964.
- The first recording on which The Beatles played, the 45 rpm record "My Bonnie", credited to "Tony Sheridan and the Beat Brothers" (recorded the previous June in Hamburg), was released by Polydor in the United Kingdom; "The Saints" was on the B-side.
- Three crew members were killed in the crash of USAF B-47E-105-BW Stratojet 52-615, piloted by Major Clarence Weldon Garrett, at March AFB, California. This would be the last fatal crash at that base until October 19, 1978.

== January 6, 1962 (Saturday) ==
- The Beany and Cecil show debuted its first episode on ABC, as part of the Matty's Funday Funnies series. Created by Bob Clampett, the cartoon was based on the television puppet show Time for Beany, which Clampett produced for Paramount Television Network from 1949 to 1955.
- The Los Angeles Mirror-News, which had been started in 1948 as an afternoon tabloid newspaper printed by the owners of the Los Angeles Times, published its final issue.
- Born:
  - Kim Weon-Kee, South Korean Olympic wrestler, gold medalist in 1984; in Hampyeong (died from heart attack, 2017)
  - Idrissa Djaló, Guinea-Bissau politician and one time presidential candidate
- Died: Marziyya Davudova, 60, Azerbaijani actress and People's Artist of the USSR

== January 7, 1962 (Sunday) ==
- Soviet theoretical physicist Lev Landau, who would win the Nobel Prize later in the year, was seriously injured in an auto accident, leaving him in a coma for two months. Landau survived, but was never able to return to work, and died on April 1, 1968.
- A bomb exploded at the Paris apartment building where controversial existentialist author Jean-Paul Sartre lived. Sartre was not home at the time, and his mother was not injured, but the fire destroyed most of his unpublished manuscripts.
- An assassination attempt against Indonesia's President Sukarno failed, but the hand grenades thrown at his automobile killed three bystanders and injured 28 others in Ujung Pandang (at that time, Makassar).
- The UK was blanketed with snow in an unusual winter storm. Overnight temperatures of −18 °C (0 °F) were recorded during the morning at Benson, Oxfordshire and Woodford, Greater Manchester in Britain.
- Born: Aleksandr Dugin, Russian ideologist and advocate of reclaiming the former Russian Empire, and author of Foundations of Geopolitics; in Moscow

== January 8, 1962 (Monday) ==
- In a closed session at the Presidium, Soviet leader Nikita Khrushchev delivered what was later referred to as the "meniscus speech", using the analogy of a wineglass filled to the point that it could overflow at any time. In the speech, which was not revealed until 40 years later, Khrushchev told the ministers that the USSR was weaker militarily than the United States, and that the only way to compete against American superiority was to maintain the threat that world tensions could spill over. "Because if we don't have a meniscus," Khrushchev said, "we let the enemy live peacefully."
- The first two teams of the United States Navy SEALs were commissioned as the United States Navy's Sea, Air and Land teams, with an order backdated to January 1, in order to carry out President Kennedy's recommendation for the development of "unconventional warfare capability". SEAL Team One, based in Coronado, California, served the Pacific Fleet and SEAL Team Two served the Atlantic Fleet out of Little Creek, Virginia. Each team consisted of 50 men and ten officers.
- In the Harmelen train disaster, two trains collided, killing 91 people in the worst rail crash in Netherlands history. An express train running from Leeuwarden to Rotterdam and a slower moving commuter train from Rotterdam struck each other at the same switching point after 9:18 a.m. in a heavy fog.
- Personnel of the Manned Spacecraft and Marshall Space Flight Centers tested special hand tools for use in zero-gravity conditions. Experiments were conducted in simulated space environment to try out non-torque hand tools drawn from a number of industrial sources.
- The Yugoslavian freighter Sabac was cut in two by the British steamer Dorington Court in a collision in the English Channel. Only eight of the 33 men on the Sabac survived.
- Born: Anatoliy Serdyukov, Russian Minister of Defense from 2007 to 2012; in Krasnodar Krai
- Died: Maximilian, Duke of Hohenberg, 59, eldest son of Archduke Franz Ferdinand and Countess Sophie

== January 9, 1962 (Tuesday) ==
- Rashidi Kawawa was appointed as the last Prime Minister of Tanganyika, by President Julius Nyerere, who had formerly had both posts. The position of Prime Minister would be abolished on December 9, after which Tanganyika and Zanzibar had merged to form Tanzania. Kawawa would become the first Prime Minister of Tanzania when that post was created in 1972.
- Cuba and the Soviet Union signed a trade pact.

== January 10, 1962 (Wednesday) ==
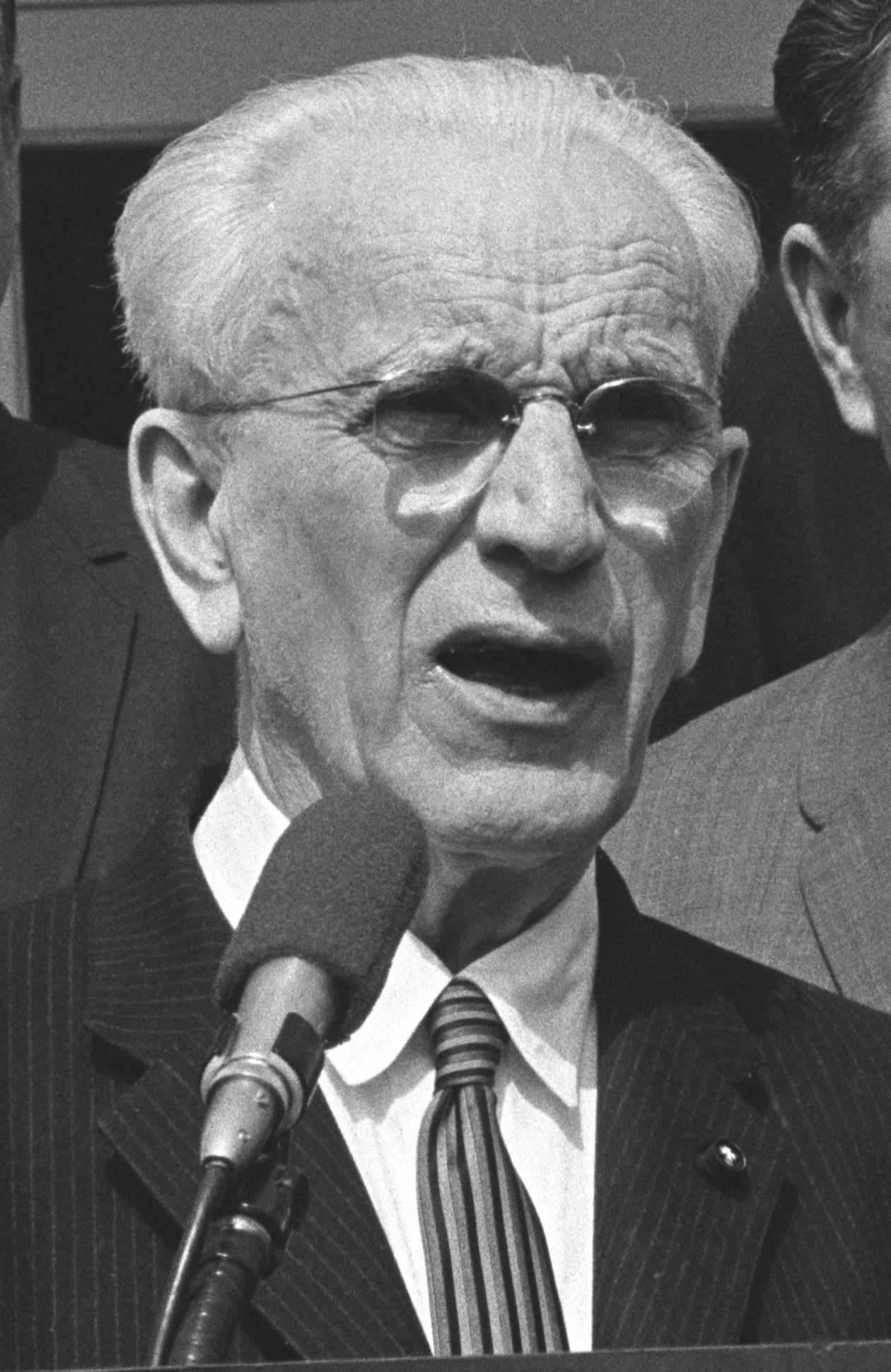
Speaker McCormack

- The U.S. House of Representatives elected Majority Leader John W. McCormack of Massachusetts as the 53rd Speaker of the House, to fill the vacancy created by the death of Sam Rayburn. The 253–159 vote was along party lines, with the Democrats voting for McCormack and the Republicans for Minority Leader Charles A. Halleck of Indiana.
- An avalanche on Mount Huascarán, the tallest peak in Peru, killed more than 4,000 people. At 6:13 p.m., melting ice triggered the slide of three million tons of ice, mud and rock down the side of Huascaran, quadrupled in size as it gathered mass, and, within eight minutes, buried the town of Ranrahirca (population 2,700) the village of Yanamachico, and three other villages totaling 800 residents. Ranrahirca, which had only 50 survivors, would be rebuilt, then destroyed again in an earthquake and an even larger avalanche on May 31, 1970.
- NASA announced that the Advanced Saturn launch vehicle, to be used for crewed flights around the Moon and for crewed lunar landings with rendezvous technique, would have five-engined first and second stages. The first stage (S-IB) would be powered by five F-1 engines (total of 7.5 million pounds thrust) and the second stage (S-II) would be powered with five J-2 engines (total of one million pounds thrust). A third stage (S-IVB) with a single J-2 engine would be used on escape missions.
- An explosion at a mine near Carterville, Illinois killed eleven coal miners.

== January 11, 1962 (Thursday) ==
- Soviet submarine B-37, nine days away from being dispatched to Cuba, was moored at Polyarny, conducting maintenance and pressurizing of outdated gas-steam torpedoes. At 8:20 a.m., a fire in the torpedo compartment detonated all twelve torpedoes, instantly destroying the submarine. Captain Anatoly Begeba, who had been outside, inspecting the top of the sub, survived. The 78 men inside the sub drowned as it sank to the bottom of the Barents Sea.
- Piloting the newest model of long-range bombers, the B-52H Stratofortress, crewmembers broke 11 non-stop distance and course-speed records, for its aircraft class and time, when they successfully completed a more-than-21-hour non-refueled flight—flying approximately 12,500 miles (20,100 km) across the globe.
- Nelson Mandela secretly left South Africa for the first time, as he was driven across the border to Botswana. From there, he went to Ethiopia to speak at a conference in Addis Ababa. He would tour the continent for the next six months. Upon his return to South Africa on August 5, he would be arrested.
- U.S. President Kennedy delivered his State of the Union Address to the United States Congress.
- Born: Kim Coles, American actress; in Brooklyn

== January 12, 1962 (Friday) ==
- Operation Chopper, the first American combat mission in Vietnam, began as the American pilots transported hundreds of South Vietnamese troops to fight against a Viet Cong force near Saigon. Three days later, President Kennedy told reporters at a press conference that American troops were not being used in combat.
- A spokesman for the Army of Indonesia, Colonel Soenarjo, said that soldiers had begun landing on West Irian, the semi-independent western side of New Guinea that remained under the administration of the Netherlands.
- Born: Richie Richardson, Antiguan cricketer and one time captain of the West Indies cricket team; in Five Islands Village

== January 13, 1962 (Saturday) ==
- First Lady Jackie Kennedy brought Charles Collingwood and a CBS News television crew into the White House for an unprecedented look at the American presidential residence. The tape of the visit was edited into the program A Tour of the White House with Mrs. John F. Kennedy and shown on CBS and NBC on February 14.
- With the United States having halted its Lockheed U-2 flights over the Soviet Union, the Republic of China (Taiwan) began regular U-2 surveillance flights over the People's Republic of China, with a group of American-trained pilots nicknamed the Black Cat Squadron.
- Albania allied itself with the People's Republic of China, as the two nations signed a trade pact.
- Born: Trace Adkins, American country music singer; in Springhill, Louisiana
- Died: Ernie Kovacs, 42, an American comedian, was killed in a car accident while driving on Santa Monica Boulevard. Kovacs and his wife, Edie Adams, were driving home separately from a baby shower in honor of Mrs. Milton Berle. At 2:00 in the morning, his station wagon skidded and crashed into a utility pole. Kovacs suffered a fatal head injury and died at the scene.

== January 14, 1962 (Sunday) ==
- The NFL Pro Bowl, described by some as one that "may have been the best in history", was won by the all-stars of the NFL Western Conference, 31–30, on the last play of the game, before a crowd of 57,409 in Los Angeles.
- A Netherlands warship sank an Indonesian torpedo boat after it approached the disputed territory of West Irian, a Netherlands colony claimed by Indonesia.
- Born: Jörgen Elofsson, Swedish songwriter; in Ängelholm

== January 15, 1962 (Monday) ==
- A 13-year-old boy testified before a Chicago juvenile court judge and confessed to setting the Our Lady of the Angels School fire that had killed 92 children and 3 nuns on December 1, 1958, in Chicago. The boy said that he had asked to be excused from class, then tossed lit matches into a cardboard waste barrel filled with paper. After an investigation, the court concluded that the evidence did not support the boy's confession, and no charges were ever filed.
- After the United Kingdom sought to join the European Economic Community, the Meteorological Office first began using Celsius temperature values in its public weather information, following the Fahrenheit values. In October, the Celsius values were listed first, and by January 1, 1973, when the government entered the EEC and completed its conversion to the metric system, Fahrenheit numbers were only used occasionally.
- Three days of training for recovery area swimmers began at the Pensacola Naval Air Station in Florida for John Glenn's Mercury 6 mission. Kenneth Kleinknecht was appointed Manager of Project Mercury, while James A. Chamberlin became Manager of Gemini Project Office.
- The Derveni papyrus, written in about 340 BC, was discovered in a cist that had been buried at the site of the Greek city of Derveni, near Thessaloniki. The oldest surviving manuscript in Europe, the papyrus roll contained a commentary on philosophy and religion.
- Portugal abandoned the U.N. General Assembly due to the debate over its East African colony in Angola.
- Died: Kenneth MacKenna, 62, American actor and film director

== January 16, 1962 (Tuesday) ==
- A Strategic Air Command B-47E Stratojet of the 380th Bomb Wing, Plattsburgh AFB, New York, on low-altitude bombing run training mission, was reported overdue at 0700 hrs. After a four-day search, wreckage was spotted in the Adirondack High Peaks. The bomber had clipped the top of Wright Peak (the 16th tallest mountain in the Adirondacks, at 4,580 feet (1,400 m)) after veering 30 miles (48 km) off course in inclement weather and high winds. The remains of Aircraft Commander 1st Lt. Rodney D. Bloomgren, of Jamestown, New York, copilot 1st Lt. Melvin Spencer, and navigator 1st Lt. Albert W. Kandetski were found after a search, but those of Airman First Class Kenneth R. Jensen KWF were never recovered. A memorial plaque was later erected on a rock near the summit by the 380th Bomb Wing.
- A military coup in the Dominican Republic, led by General Pedro Rodríguez Echavarría, forced President Joaquín Balaguer to resign and go into exile. Earlier in the day in Santo Domingo, soldiers fired into a crowd of people protesting against the new regime, killing 8 people and wounding many more. Balaguer had been the leader of a council of state with seven civilians and had pledged to hold elections on February 27, 1963. The junta consisted of two former state council members, two civilians from the old Trujillo government, and three military officers, but had no presiding leader. The other council members were placed under house arrest.
- Sutan Sjahrir, who had been the first Prime Minister of Indonesia (1945–47), was arrested on orders of the President he had served, Sukarno. He would remain incarcerated for three years until Sukarno sent him into exile for reasons of health and would die in 1966.
- The Jackson State Times, an afternoon daily newspaper in Jackson, Mississippi, published its last issue, leaving the city with the two dailies owned by Mississippi Publishers Corporation, the Jackson Daily News and The Clarion-Ledger.
- Mercury spacecraft No. 16 was delivered to Cape Canaveral for the Mercury 8 mission, which would orbit with Wally Schirra on October 3, 1962.
- Died: Ivan Meštrović, 78, Croatian sculptor

== January 17, 1962 (Wednesday) ==
- A furniture warehouse fire in the German city of Nuremberg killed twenty employees, including four who jumped from the fourth story of the building. Police arrested one of the survivors, a paper press operator who had worked in the basement and was believed to have accidentally caused the blaze by throwing a cigarette.
- Ten former game show contestants, all of whom had testified under oath that they had not been given answers in advance of their appearances, pleaded guilty to perjury. The most prominent was former Columbia University instructor Charles Van Doren, who had won $129,000 on the program Twenty One.
- United States government workers were given the right of collective bargaining by President Kennedy, in Executive Order 10988.
- Frank Sinatra completed the recording of his album All Alone, in Los Angeles.
- Born: Jim Carrey, Canadian-American actor and comedian; in Newmarket, Ontario
- Died: Gerrit Achterberg, 56, Dutch poet

== January 18, 1962 (Thursday) ==
- The drawing to determine the arrangement of the 16 teams of the 1962 World Cup took place at Santiago in Chile, host of the world soccer football championship. The four seeded teams, and the three others in each group, were Uruguay, Colombia, the Soviet Union and Yugoslavia in Group 1; Italy, Chile, Switzerland and West Germany in Group 2; Brazil, Czechoslovakia, Mexico and Spain in Group 3; and England, Argentina, Bulgaria and Hungary in Group 4. Competition would begin on May 30, with the finals on June 17.
- Two days after seizing power in the Dominican Republic, General Pedro Rodriguez Echavarria was overthrown in a countercoup by his own officers, who then freed members of the former council of state who had been under house arrest. The council's first act of business was to accept Balaguer's resignation, with Rafael Filiberto Bonnelly as his successor.
- Former Nazi German General Karl Wolff, who had been chief of staff to Heinrich Himmler and overseer of the SS Einsatzgruppen, was arrested by West German police at his lakeside vacation home in Kempfenhausen.
- In the lead-up to the opening of negotiations on Ireland's entry to the European Community, Irish Prime Minister Seán Lemass addressed the members of the other EC governments at their headquarters in Brussels.

== January 19, 1962 (Friday) ==
- KGB agents identified Colonel Oleg Penkovsky as the man who was secretly meeting British national Janet Chisholm in Moscow. The agents, who had been shadowing Mrs. Chisholm, had first seen the two together on December 30, and followed Penkovsky to his apartment. Surveillance determined that Colonel Penkovsky, a high clearance official with the Soviet military intelligence agency GRU, had been bringing home classified material relating to ballistic missiles, photographing it, and giving the film to the British intelligence agency MI-6. Penkovsky, whose information alerted the United States to the placement of nuclear missiles in Cuba, would be arrested on October 22, when the Cuban Missile Crisis began, and would be executed on May 16, 1963, for treason.
- Dr. John P. Meehan of the University of Southern California reported that Enos, the 37-pound (17 kg) chimpanzee who orbited the Earth in Mercury-Atlas 5 on November 29, 1961, developed temporary hypertension during flight due to frustration and confusion caused by equipment malfunction.
- Died:
  - John Beals Chandler, 74, former Lord Mayor of Brisbane
  - Snub Pollard, 72, American silent film comedian
  - Onn Jaafar, 66, Malay politician

== January 20, 1962 (Saturday) ==
- The play Prescription: Murder, by Richard Levinson and William Link, was first presented, with the premiere at the Curran Theatre in San Francisco. Character actor Thomas Mitchell portrayed a disheveled police detective named Lt. Columbo. When the play was made into a TV movie in 1968, Peter Falk portrayed the detective, and then in the title role of Columbo, one of the recurring segments of the NBC Mystery Movie. Columbo had been seen once before, on July 30, 1960, in the presentation "Enough Rope", part of The Chevy Mystery Show.
- Petula Clark had her first number one hit in France with "Romeo".
- Died:
  - J. Spencer Love, 65, American industrialist who went from being a payroll clerk at a textile company, to being the founder of Burlington Industries.
  - Robinson Jeffers, 75, American poet

== January 21, 1962 (Sunday) ==
- The Organization of American States (OAS) began its Eighth Meeting of Consultation of the Ministers of Foreign Affairs in Punta del Este, Uruguay, in the course of which the United States agreed to resume aid to Haiti in return for its support of sanctions against Cuba. Haiti's participation was essential because the United States was a vote short of having the 2/3rds majority of the 21 member nations.
- Born: Marie Trintignant, French actress; in Boulogne-Billancourt, the daughter of Jean-Louis Trintignant and Nadine Marquand (d. 2003)
- Died: Andrew Schoeppel, 67, U.S. Senator from Kansas since 1949

== January 22, 1962 (Monday) ==
- The Organisation Armée Secrète (OAS), opposed to the independence of Algeria, bombed the French Foreign Ministry, by placing a time bomb inside a truck that was going into the compound. A mailroom worker was killed, and three people were seriously injured by the shattering of hundreds of windows at the Quai d'Orsay. Gunmen from the OAS also kidnapped a member of Parliament, Dr. Paul Mainguy, who was rescued that afternoon by French police.
- While cast in the film Cleopatra, Richard Burton and Elizabeth Taylor fell in love on the first day of filming the re-enactment of the romance between Mark Antony and Queen Cleopatra, which had taken place in 40 BC. They divorced their respective spouses, Sybil Burton and Eddie Fisher, and married in 1964, divorcing in 1974, remarrying in 1975, and divorcing again in 1976.
- The Organization of American States (OAS) suspended Cuba's membership. Whilst technically still a member, the Cuban government was denied the rights of representation, attendance at meetings and participation in OAS activities.
- Born:
  - Mizan Zainal Abidin of Terengganu, 13th Yang di-Pertuan Agong, constitutional head of state of Malaysia from 2006 to 2011; in Kuala Terengganu
  - Sirous Ghayeghran, Iranian footballer and captain of the national team, with 43 appearances from 1986 to 1993; in Bandar Anzali (d. 1998)

== January 23, 1962 (Tuesday) ==
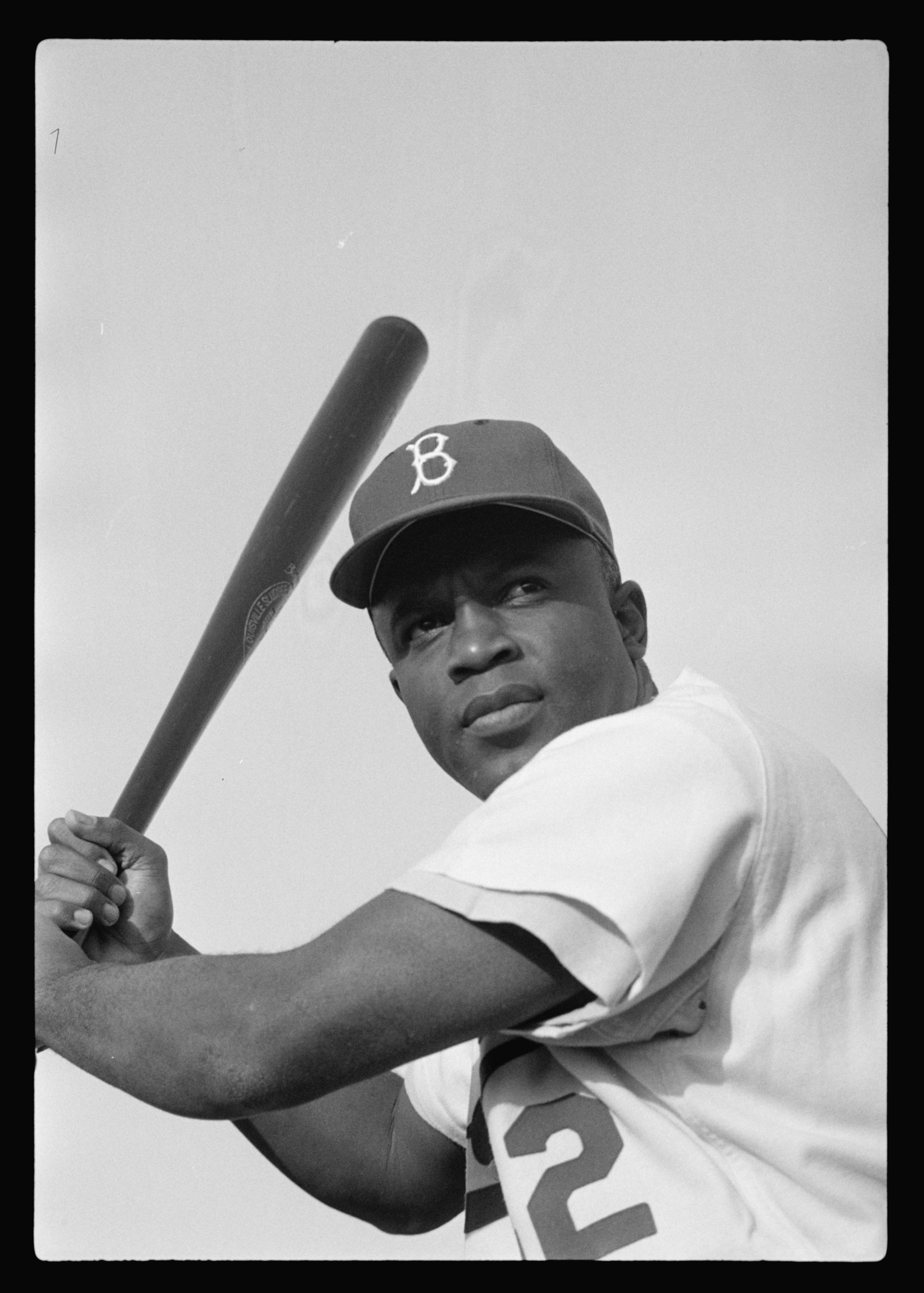
Jackie Robinson

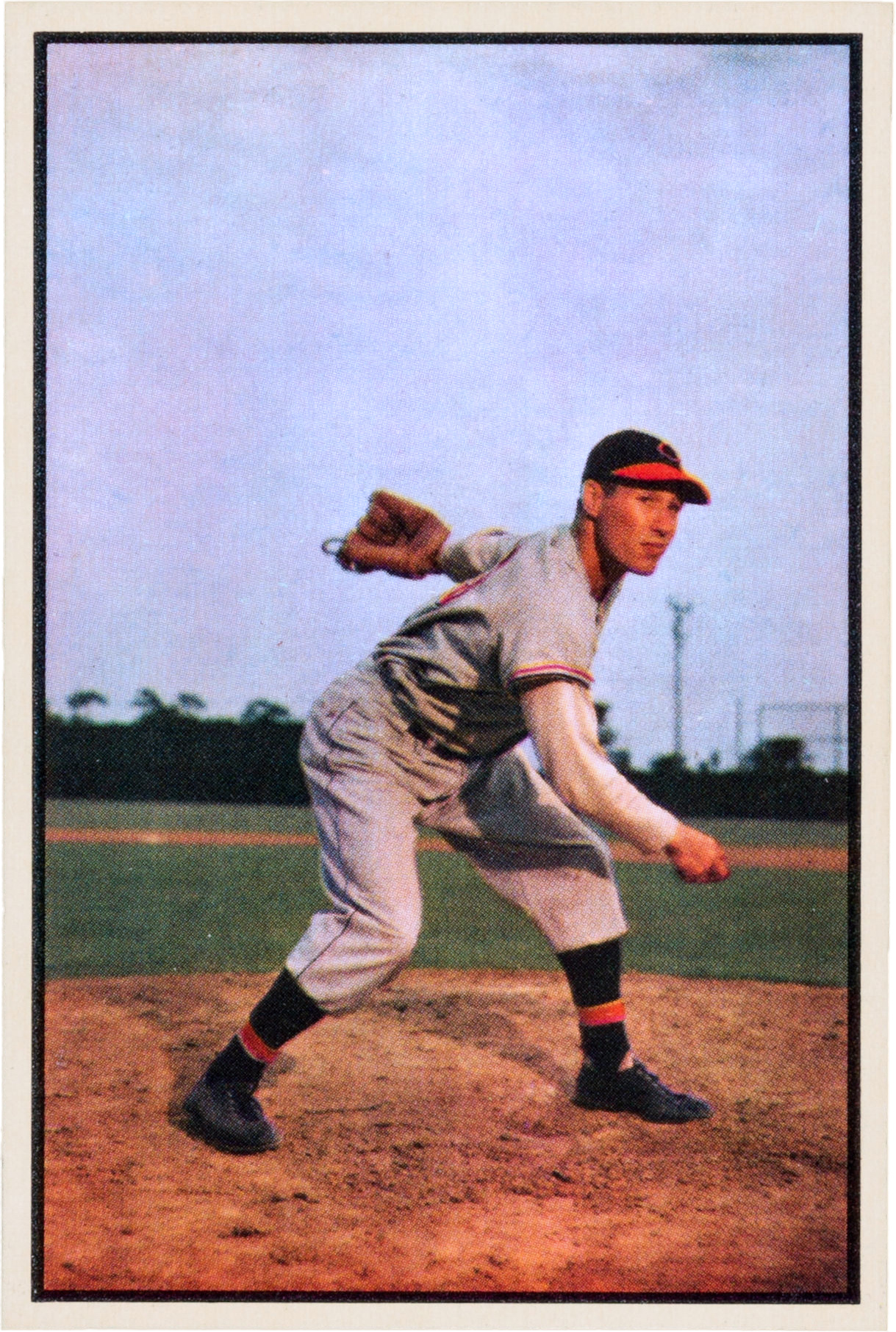
Bob Feller

- In his first year of eligibility, Jackie Robinson was elected to the Baseball Hall of Fame, receiving 124 of the 160 ballots cast and becoming the first African-American to be enshrined at Cooperstown. In addition to being the first black MLB player of the modern era, Robinson had also been a six time All-Star, the 1947 Rookie of the Year, and the 1949 MVP for the National League. Cleveland Indians pitcher Bob Feller, elected on the same day, was also inducted in his first year of eligibility. It was the first time since the original five selections (Ty Cobb, Babe Ruth, Walter Johnson, Honus Wagner and Christy Mathewson) that anyone had won 75% of the votes on their first try.
- Singer Tony Bennett first recorded what would become his signature song, "I Left My Heart in San Francisco". Ralph Sharon, who accompanied Bennett's songs on the piano, had been shown the song in 1959 by writers George Cory and Douglass Cross, then put it away in a dresser drawer. Sharon ran across it again when Bennett was invited to perform in San Francisco, and Bennett sang it in December. The song was released as the B-side of "Once Upon a Time", and went on to sell two million copies and to win two Grammy Awards.
- American inventor Thomas Townsend Brown received U.S. Patent 3,018,394 for an "Electro-kinetic Transducer", a means of using an electric field as a means of propulsion of aircraft.
- Died: Natalia Sedova Trotsky, 79, widow of Leon Trotsky

== January 24, 1962 (Wednesday) ==
- An attempt by the United States to launch five satellites into orbit from the same rocket failed when the final stage of the Thor-Able-Star rocket failed to provide sufficient thrust to break the pull of gravity. Falling into the Gulf of Mexico "well south of Cuba" were the 80-foot (24 m) rocket and the satellites SR-4, Injun II, Lofti II, Secor and Surcal, worth $3,500,000 altogether.
- The East German government instituted conscription into its armed forces, which formerly had been filled by volunteers. Western sources speculated that the East Germans had waited until the completion of the Berlin Wall before announcing the draft.
- Brian Epstein made a verbal contract with the four members of The Beatles, becoming their manager in return for receiving up to 25 percent of their gross earnings.
- Died: Stanley Lord, 84, captain of the SS Californian at the time of the sinking of RMS Titanic nearly 50 years earlier

== January 25, 1962 (Thursday) ==
- Anandyn Amar, who had served twice as Prime Minister of Mongolia (1928–30 and 1936–39) and Chairman of the Presidium of State (1932–36) before becoming a victim of a purge by Joseph Stalin, was posthumously rehabilitated, more than 20 years after his execution by the Soviet Union on July 27, 1941.
- Governor of Montana Donald G. Nutter was killed, along with five other people, in a plane crash. Nutter had been on his way from Helena to a speaking engagement in Cut Bank when his C-47 plane went down in a mountain canyon near Wolf Creek. He was succeeded by Lt. Governor Tim M. Babcock.

== January 26, 1962 (Friday) ==
- The American space probe Ranger 3 was launched from Cape Canaveral at 3:30 p.m. local time with the objective of duplicating the Soviet feat of landing a satellite on the Moon. Hours later, NASA announced that the Atlas rocket had hurled Ranger 3 into its trajectory too quickly, and that the probe would miss its target by 22,000 miles (35,000 km). Intersecting the Moon's orbit after 50 hours instead of the planned 66 hours, the spacecraft arrived too soon, got no closer than 22,862 miles (36,793 km) from the Moon and went into orbit around the Sun.
- In Brazil, an accident killed 17 employees at the National Steel Company in Volta Redonda, when a ladle of molten steel poured down upon them during the morning shift.
- The Martin Marietta company recommended only minimal modifications to the modified Titan II Gemini Launch Vehicle, including a malfunction detection system; backup guidance, control, and hydraulic systems; and selective electrical redundancies.
- Died:
  - Charles "Lucky" Luciano, 64, Sicilian-born American mafioso who had been deported from the U.S. months earlier. Exiled in Italy, Luciano had just greeted film producer Martin Gosch, who had arrived at the Capodichino Airport in Naples to discuss plans for a film about Luciano's life. As the two men walked out of the terminal with policeman Marcello Resta, Luciano, who had ordered the murder of more than 40 rival gangsters during his career, collapsed from a fatal heart attack at 5:25 in the afternoon. A deputy commissioner of the U.S. Narcotics Bureau told reporters later that day that Luciano had been facing re-arrest for his role in a major drug ring. The film, Lucky Luciano, would be made eleven years later and released in 1974, with Italian actor Gian Maria Volonté portraying Luciano.
  - Gerald Rudolff Ford, 71, adoptive father of future U.S. President Gerald R. Ford and owner of a paint and varnish manufacturing company in Grand Rapids, Michigan, died of injuries after slipping on an icy sidewalk. In 1917, the elder Ford had married Ford's mother and then changed the name of her 3-year-old son, Leslie Lynch King, Jr. to his own, with the exception of spelling the middle name as Rudolph.
  - Eunice Gray, 77, died in a fire at the Waco Hotel in Fort Worth, Texas, which she had operated for 40 years. Theories abound that Gray was the same person as Etta Place, former girlfriend, last seen in 1907, of Harry Longabaugh, the Sundance Kid.

== January 27, 1962 (Saturday) ==
- At a major conference in Beijing, Liu Shaoqi, President of the People's Republic of China, criticized the "Great Leap Forward", the disastrous 1958 economic program created by of Communist Party Chairman Mao Zedong. "People do not have enough food, clothes or other essentials... agricultural output has dropped tremendously," Liu told the assembly, adding "There is not only no Great Leap Forward, but a great deal of falling backward." Chairman Mao made a rare self-criticism three days later, and eventually took revenge on Liu, who disappeared in 1968 and reportedly died in 1969.
- With the publication of a January 15 decree of the Supreme Soviet, the Soviet Union changed all remaining street names and place names honoring Vyacheslav Molotov, Lazar Kaganovich, Georgi Malenkov, and Kliment Voroshilov two months after the five aides to Joseph Stalin had been denounced by the Soviet Communist Party. The Azerbaijan SSR city of Molotov would become Oktyabrkend, and the city of Perm, Russia, had reverted to its name after Molotov's ouster in 1957; Voroshilovgrad was renamed Luhansk and Voroshilov in the far east became Ussuriysk.
- Countdown for the first launch of a U.S. astronaut into orbit was halted 20 minutes before the scheduled 7:30 a.m. liftoff. U.S. Marine Corps Lieutenant Colonel John H. Glenn, Jr. had been inside the Mercury 6 capsule since 5:10 a.m., while much of the United States watched live television coverage. After technical difficulties halted the countdown, the skies became overcast with thick cloud cover, and the mission was scrubbed at 9:20 a.m.
- Peter Snell set a new world record for the mile, running the distance in 3 minutes, 54.4 seconds, at Cook's Gardens, Wanganui. Herb Elliott of Australia had held the record since August 6, 1958.
- Died: Frances Glessner Lee, 83, American forensic scientist who created the Nutshell Studies of Unexplained Death

== January 28, 1962 (Sunday) ==
- The last streetcar in Washington, D.C. ran for the final time at 2:00 a.m., as the transit company retired its 27-car fleet. The day before, free rides were offered for all children accompanied by a paying adult and thousands took advantage of the offer. By 1962, only ten American cities still had trolleys.
- Johannes Relleke, a tin miner at Kamativi in Southern Rhodesia (now Zimbabwe), survived 2,443 bee stings and earned a spot in the Guinness World Records category "Most bee stings removed".
- Wasfi al-Tal succeeded Bahjat al-Talhouni as Prime Minister of Jordan, serving as Prime Minister until his assassination in 1971.
- Born: Peter Verhelst, Belgian writer; in Bruges
- Died: Robert J. O. Compston, 64, British World War I fighter pilot

== January 29, 1962 (Monday) ==
- The Automobile Manufacturers Association of the U.S. announced that all 1963 model American vehicles would be equipped with amber-colored turn signals on the front, rather than being the same color as the headlights, which had been the standard since the signals had first been introduced in 1938. The change was made after the manufacturers had lobbied for the repeal of bans in 25 states against amber-colored lights.
- The Miss Dominican Republic competition was held in Santo Domingo and was won by Sarah Olimpia Frómeta Pou.
- Born:
  - Ismail Haniyeh, Palestinian militant and politician known for launching the Gaza War in 2023, co-founder and leader of Hamas (Ḥarakat al-Muqāwamah al-ʾIslāmiyyah, Isalamic Resistanced Movement) Political Bureau in the Gaza strip 2007–2017, Prime Minister of the Palestinian National Authority 2006–2014; in the Al-Shati refugee camp in Egyptian-administered Gaza (killed by Israeli air strike, 2024)
  - Olga Tokarczuk, Polish writer and 2018 Nobel Prize in Literature laureate, known for her novels Flights,Primeval and Other Times, Drive Your Plow Over the Bones of the Dead, and The Books of Jacob; in Sulechów
- Died: Fritz Kreisler, 86, Austrian violinist

== January 30, 1962 (Tuesday) ==
- In what became known as the "Tanganyika laughter epidemic", three students at a girls' boarding school in the Tanzanian village of Kashasha began laughing, and other students reacted. Within six weeks, 95 of the school's 159 students were laughing uncontrollably, and on March 18, the school closed and sent the pupils back to their home villages. The mass reaction spread to the villages of Nshamba, Ramanshenye, and Kanyangereka and affected hundreds of people before halting in 1963.
- Two of the high-wire "Flying Wallendas" were killed when their famous 7-person pyramid collapsed during a tightrope walking performance at the Shrine Circus at the State Fair Coliseum in Detroit. Dieter Schepp, who had lost his footing and caused the group to topple, and Richard Faughnan both died of head injuries after falling 36 feet (11 m) to the concrete arena floor. Mario Wallenda was paralyzed as a result of the accident, and Karl Wallenda and Jana Schepp were hospitalized for their injuries.
- Fourteen of the 21 member states of the Organization of American States voted to oust Cuba. Six other nations abstained, and Cuba voted against the resolution, which barely passed by a two-thirds majority.
- Born:
  - Prince Abdullah of Jordan, to King Hussein and Princess Muna Al Hussein, formerly Antoinette Avril Gardiner of Britain. He would succeed his father as King Abdullah II in 1999; in Amman
  - Mary Kay Letourneau, American child rapist; in Tustin, California (died from colorectal cancer, 2020)

== January 31, 1962 (Wednesday) ==
- An accident killed 11 people who were on their way to a labor camp in Mendota, California, after their bus was struck by a Southern Pacific freight train. An unusually heavy fog in the San Joaquin and Sacramento valleys of central California had led to 17 other deaths on U.S. Highway 99 since January 28 because of visibility of less than 100 feet (30 m). The cloud cover would dissipate by February 2.
- The rescheduled liftoff of John Glenn and the Mercury 6 mission was postponed again because of technical difficulties with the launch vehicle.
- Telling reporters that "It's a tradition that the show must go on," tightrope walkers Gunther Wallenda and his father, Herman Wallenda, walked the high wire at the Shrine Circus in Detroit, 24 hours after the disaster that had killed two members of the troupe and put three others in the hospital.
- Snowfall with accumulation was recorded on the Mediterranean island of Malta, a very rare meteorological occurrence.
- NASA's Manned Spacecraft Center requested 11 modified Atlas-Agena rockets for future use as rendezvous vehicles. Modifications needed included were radar and visual navigation and tracking aids, main engines capable of multiple restarts, a secondary propulsion system, a stabilization system, and an external rendezvous docking unit. The first Agena rendezvous vehicle was to be delivered to the launch site in 20 months (by August 1964), with one thereafter every 60 days.
- Born: Alexey Miller, Russian industrialist; in Leningrad (now Saint Petersburg)
- Died: Noel Purcell, 70, Irish rugby union and Olympic champion water polo player who represented the Ireland national team in both sports during the 1920s.
