= A Look at Monaco (album) =

Studio album by Percy Faith
- Released: 1963
- Recorded: 1963
- Genre: Easy listening
- Label: Columbia

Percy Faith chronology
American Serenade (1963)	A Look at Monaco (1963)	Shangri-La! (1963)

A Look at Monaco is a 1963 soundtrack album by Percy Faith and performed by the Orchestre National de l'Opera de Monte Carlo for the CBS television special and documentary A Look at Monaco. The film featured a tour of the principal sites of Monaco conducted by the former American actress Grace Kelly, who had become the Princess Consort of Monaco upon her 1956 marriage to Rainier III, Prince of Monaco.

Princess Grace's narration from the film is featured on the album.

== Track listing ==
1. "Prelude (Fireworks and the Faces of Monaco)" - 1:46
2. "Monaco" - 2:12
3. "The Old Palace" - 3:04
4. "The Children" - 1:26
5. "The Courtyard" - 0:53
6. "In the Palace (The Clock, The Painting, The Mirror, The Throne)" - 1:53
7. "Outdoors" - 2:45
8. "The Zoo (Elephant, Lions, Leopard, Chimp)" - 4:02
9. "The Museum" - 1:18
10. "Water Sports (The Boat Ride)" - 4:03
11. "National Holiday, March and the Opera House" - 4:06
12. "National Anthem" - 1:15
13. "Farewell" - 2:27

== Personnel ==
- Princess Grace of Monaco - narration
- Percy Faith - arranger
- Orchestre National de l'Opera de Monte Carlo
