= Veterum Sapientia =

Apostolic constitution by Pope John XXIII

Veterum Sapientia (English: "The Wisdom of the Ancients") is an apostolic constitution promulgated by Pope John XXIII on February 22, 1962 regarding the significance of Latin and other non-vernacular languages to the Catholic Church and in the priesthood.

== Quotes ==
By the working of its nature, the Latin language is most suitable for furthering every kind of cultural initiative among all sorts of peoples, since it does not incite jealousy, but is equally accessible to every race of men. It is not partisan, but rather, favorable and welcoming to all. Nor would it be right not to mention that there exists in the Latin language an innate, noble harmoniousness and propriety – “a way of speaking which is dense with meaning, rich, and abundant, full of majesty and dignity.” It has qualities within it which are uniquely conducive both to clarity and to seriousness.

“The Catholic Church has a dignity far surpassing that of every merely human society, for it was founded by Christ the Lord. It is altogether fitting, therefore, that the language it uses should be noble, majestic, and non-vernacular.”
