= Luisenthal mine disaster =

Mine incident

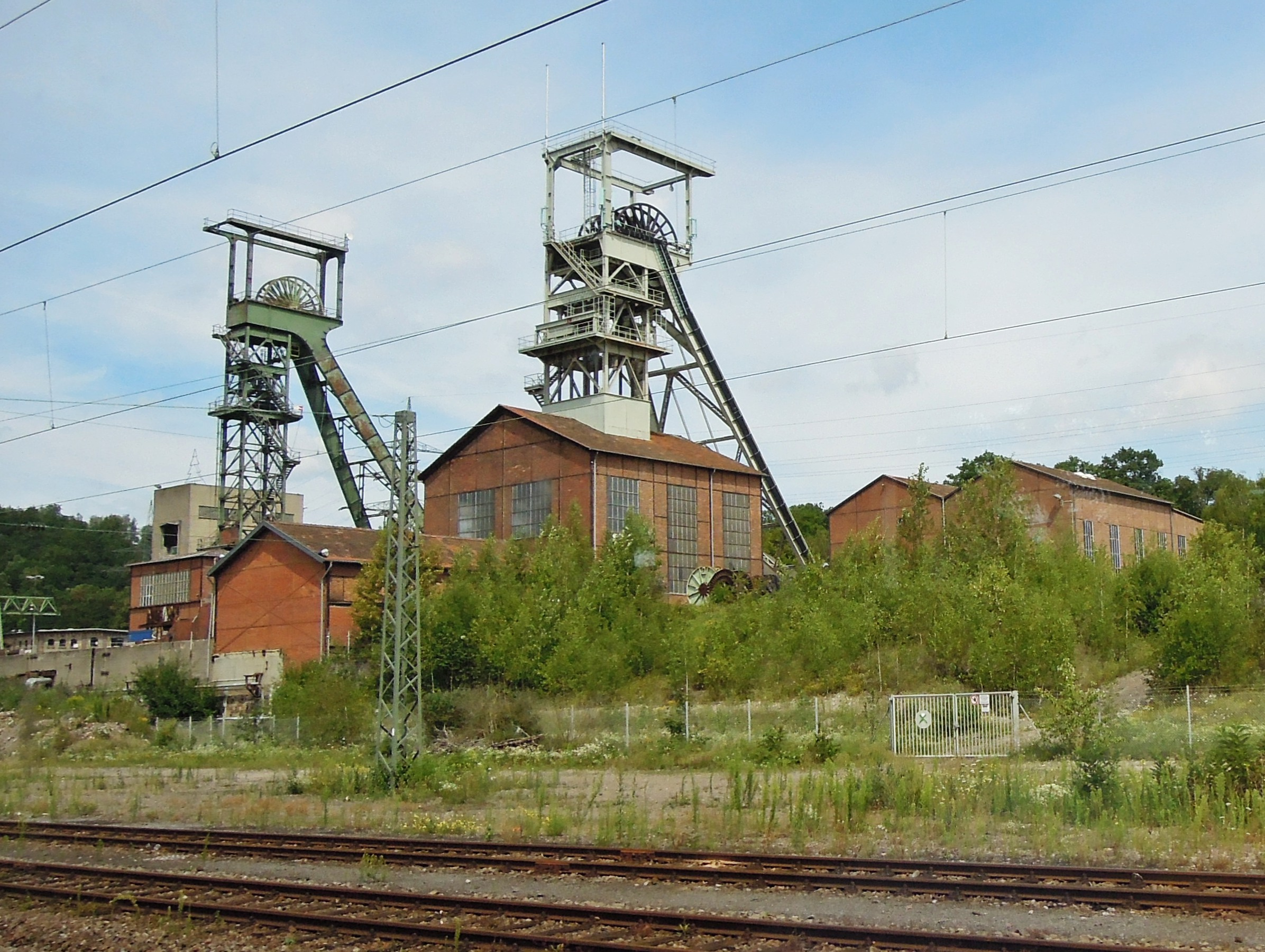
Modern photo of the Luisenthal Mine

The Luisenthal mine disaster was the most serious mine accident in the history of the Federal Republic of Germany. The explosion killed 299 miners.

== History of the Luisenthal Mine ==
The Luisenthal Mine is located in Völklingen, a town in the state of Saarland, Germany. The mine has been in operation since the 1800s, although coal has been mined in Luisthenal since 1719. The Luisenthal mine was considered to be very susceptible to firedamp explosions due to the high concentration of firedamp in the seams. From 1904 to 1954 there were 20 fires and explosions in the pit. In 1941, an explosion killed 41 miners. Because of this, the pit was equipped with state-of-the-art technology. Subsequently, the mine was awarded for its high safety standards.

== The mine disaster, 7 February 1962 ==
During the early shift on 7 February 1962, there were 664 miners working in the pit. Around 7:45 a.m., an explosion occurred in the Alsbach shaft of the mine at a depth of more than 600 metres (2,000 ft). The explosion was strong enough to lift the manhole cover off the Alsbach shaft. 299 miners were killed in the explosion, while 73 miners were injured. Some of those who died underground were burned beyond recognition.

The cause of the explosion is still unclear. Among other things, it was speculated whether a miner had smoked illegally underground, because cigarettes were found during the clean-up work. A defective mine lamp was also named as a possible cause. Today, it is believed that a coal dust explosion occurred as a result of a primary firedamp explosion.

== Aftermath ==
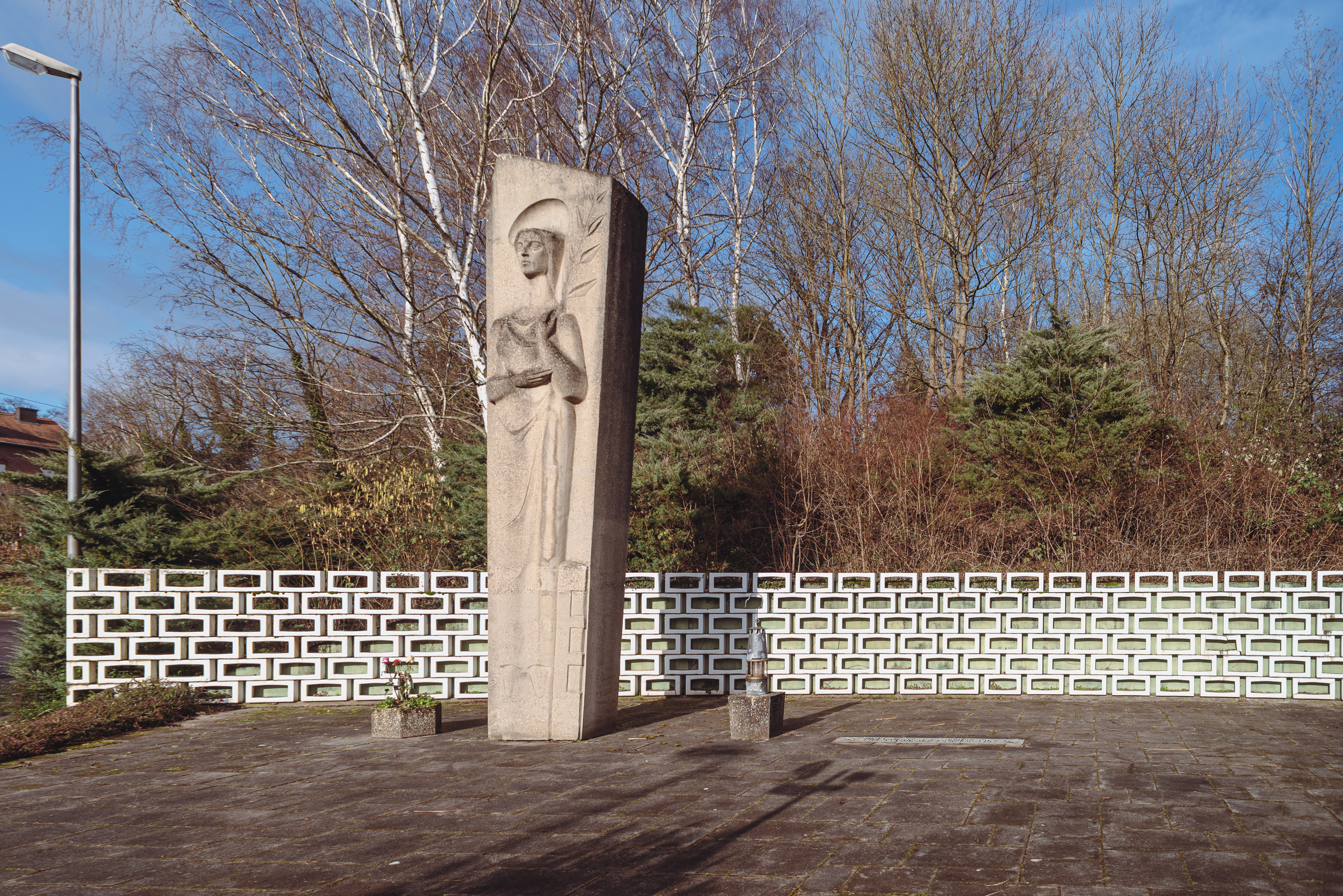
Memorial to the Luisenthal Mine Disaster Victims

On 11 February 1962, a memorial was held for 286 of the dead miners. The memorial was led by the then West Germany President, Heinrich Luebke. Around 4,500 people were in attendance.

The Luisenthal Mine closed down on 17 June 2005. Near the now abandoned pit there is a memorial with a statue of St. Barbara, the patron saint of miners. A wall of 299 stones with continuous niches for placing memorial candles symbolizes the 299 victims of the accident. The monument was made by the artist Lothar Meßner (1926–2019). There is also a memorial to the dead miners in the building of the Saarbrücken Mining Directorate. The memorial is a series of three stained glass windows, and is titled "Our Dead Miners".
