= Charles Collingwood (journalist) =

American broadcast journalist (1917–1985)

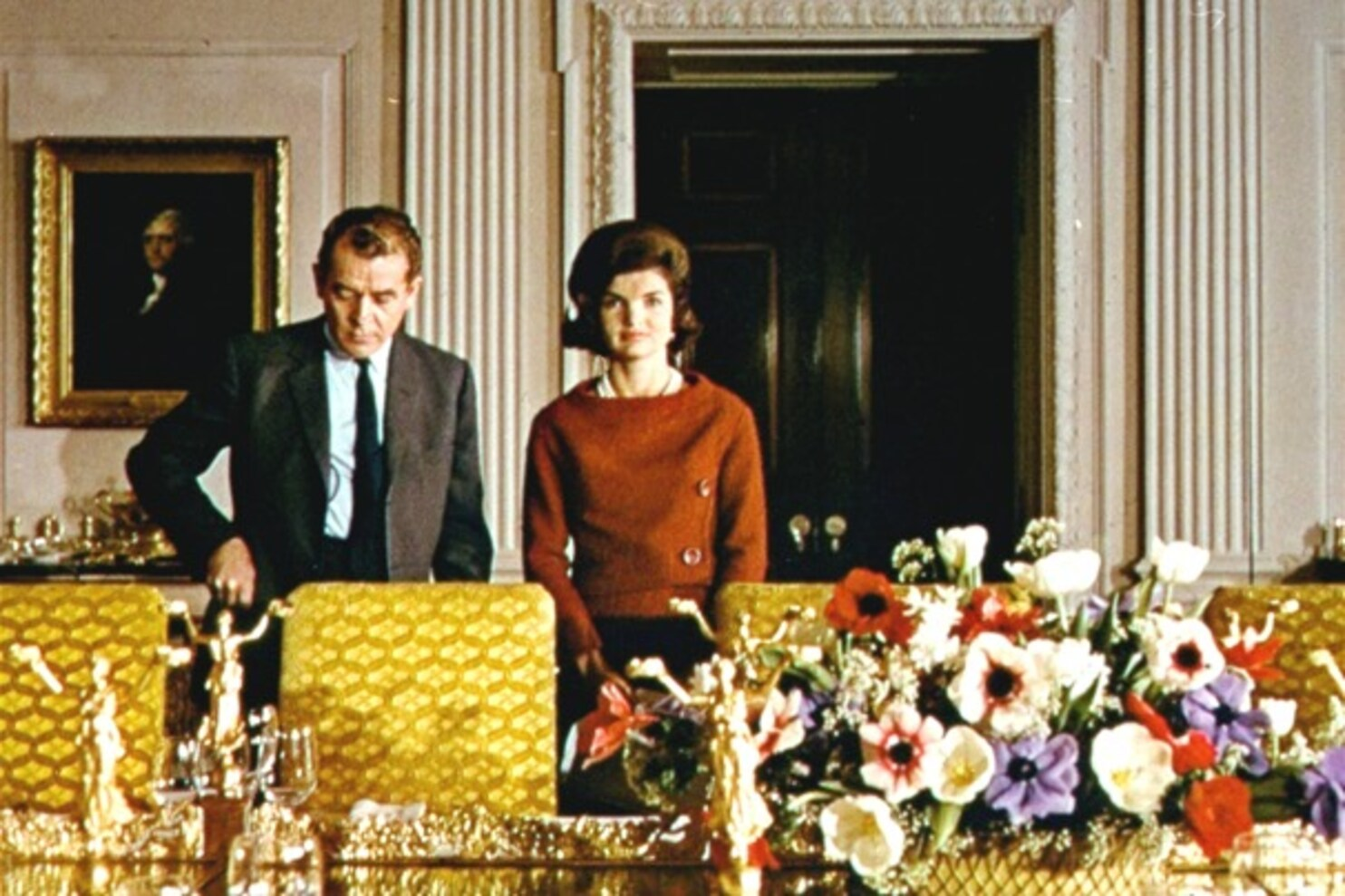
- With Jacqueline Kennedy at the White House during the taping of A Tour of the White House with Mrs. John F. Kennedy.
- Born: June 4, 1917; Three Rivers, Michigan, U.S.
- Died: October 3, 1985 (aged 68); New York City, U.S.
- Education: Deep Springs College; Cornell University; Oxford University
- Occupation: Broadcast journalist
- Notable credit: CBS News
- Spouses: Louise Allbritton (m. 1946; died 1979) Tatiana Jolin (m. 1984)

Charles Collingwood (June 4, 1917 – October 3, 1985) was an American journalist and war correspondent. He was an early member of Edward R. Murrow's group of foreign correspondents that was known as the "Murrow Boys". During World War II, he covered Europe and North Africa for CBS News. Collingwood was also among the early ranks of television journalists who included Walter Cronkite, Eric Sevareid, and Murrow himself.

== Early life ==
Collingwood was born in Three Rivers, Michigan. He attended Deep Springs College and graduated from Cornell University. In 1939, he received a Rhodes Scholarship to study at Oxford University.

== World War II ==
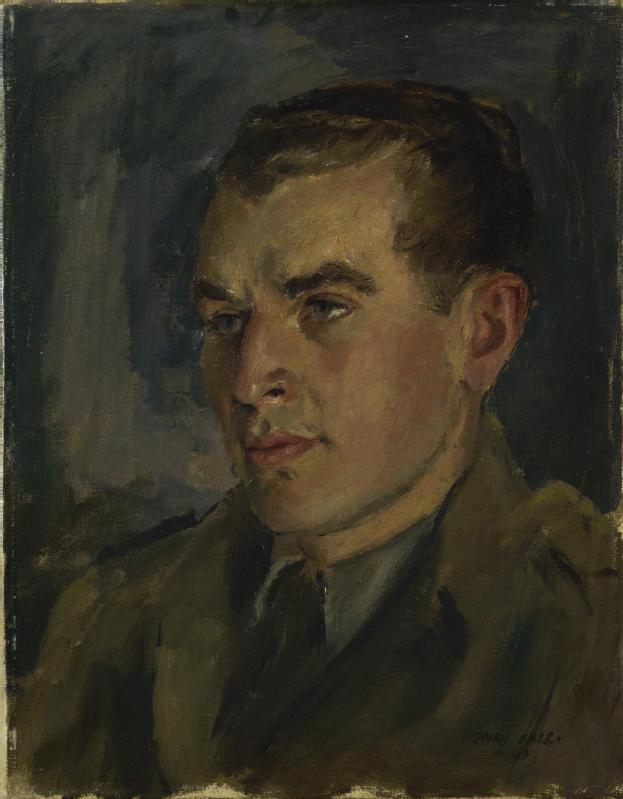
1943 portrait of war correspondent Charles Collingwood (Henry Carr)

Collingwood covered World War II for United Press in London and was soon recruited to CBS by Edward R. Murrow in 1941. He established himself as an urbane and spontaneously-eloquent on-air journalist.

In 1942, Collingwood was sent to cover the North African Campaign, where he proved his reporting abilities despite being considered "green" as a broadcast journalist.

On D-Day, he landed at Utah Beach hours after the first wave of soldiers had hit the beaches. Of the CBS reporters accompanying the ground invasion, he recorded a report on June 6 that made it to broadcast two days later. The other CBS correspondents on the ground, Bill Downs and Larry LeSueur, were not able to deliver reports until days later because of trouble setting up mobile transmitters.

When General Omar Bradley told Collingwood that the French Resistance was about to rise up and liberate Paris, Collingwood prepared and sent a recording with news of the liberation to CBS in London so that it would be ready when the city was actually freed. The recording bore a label that said to hold it back until Paris was actually liberated, but the technician at CBS did not read the label and immediately aired the recording. On that day, August 22, there were still thousands of German troops in Paris, and the Resistance fighters who were fighting and dying did not appreciate that the world was told that Paris had been liberated. The city was not actually liberated until three days later, on August 25.

== Later career ==
After the war, Collingwood remained with CBS and established himself as a television journalist. One of his first roles on television was as host of the CBS documentary series Adventure, which was produced in collaboration with the American Museum of Natural History. He went on to become the chief correspondent of CBS and host of its Eyewitness to History series. In 1959 he succeeded Edward R. Murrow as host of Person to Person. He was a leading figure in CBS's expansion to include international coverage, and was CBS News's first United Nations correspondent. He later served as the network's White House correspondent.

Collingwood accompanied then-First Lady Jacqueline Kennedy on a televised tour of the White House which she had renovated during the first year of the presidency of her husband, United States President John F. Kennedy. The resulting program, A Tour of the White House with Mrs. John F. Kennedy, was broadcast on Valentine's Day in 1962 and was seen by 80 million viewers and broadcast in 50 countries, including Russia and China.

He served as substitute anchor during portions of CBS's coverage of the Kennedy assassination on November 22, 1963, relieving Walter Cronkite only minutes after Cronkite had announced the official confirmation of Kennedy's death.

Collingwood was CBS's chief foreign correspondent from 1964 to 1975, covering warfare in Southeast Asia. In 1968, he became the first American reporter allowed into North Vietnam. The inspiration for Collingwood's 1970 espionage novel The Defector largely came from this visit. The book received critical praise for its merits as a thriller and for its insights into the complexities of the Vietnam War.

== Personal life ==
Collingwood retired in 1982. He was married to actress Louise Allbritton from 1946 until she died of cancer in 1979. He married the Swedish singer Tatiana Angelini-Jolin (née Scheremetiew) (1923–2006) in 1984. He died of cancer on October 3, 1985, at Lenox Hill Hospital in New York City.

== Honors ==
- Received the Peabody Award for Outstanding Reporting of the News in 1942. He received a second Peabody Award in 1955.
- Received an award from the National Headliner's Club in 1943 for "consistently accurate and interesting accounts of the fighting in North Africa war zone." He received a second award in 1949 for "coverage of the Arizona-Colorado dispute over the division of water from the Colorado River."
- Received the General Federation of Women's Club Television Award in education in 1956, and the "Better Understanding" award from the English-Speaking Union in 1957.
- Made Honorary Commander of the Order of the British Empire by Queen Elizabeth II in 1975 for contributions to British-American friendship and understanding.
- Made a Chevalier in the French Legion of Honour.
