= A Tour of the White House with Mrs. John F. Kennedy =

1962 US television special

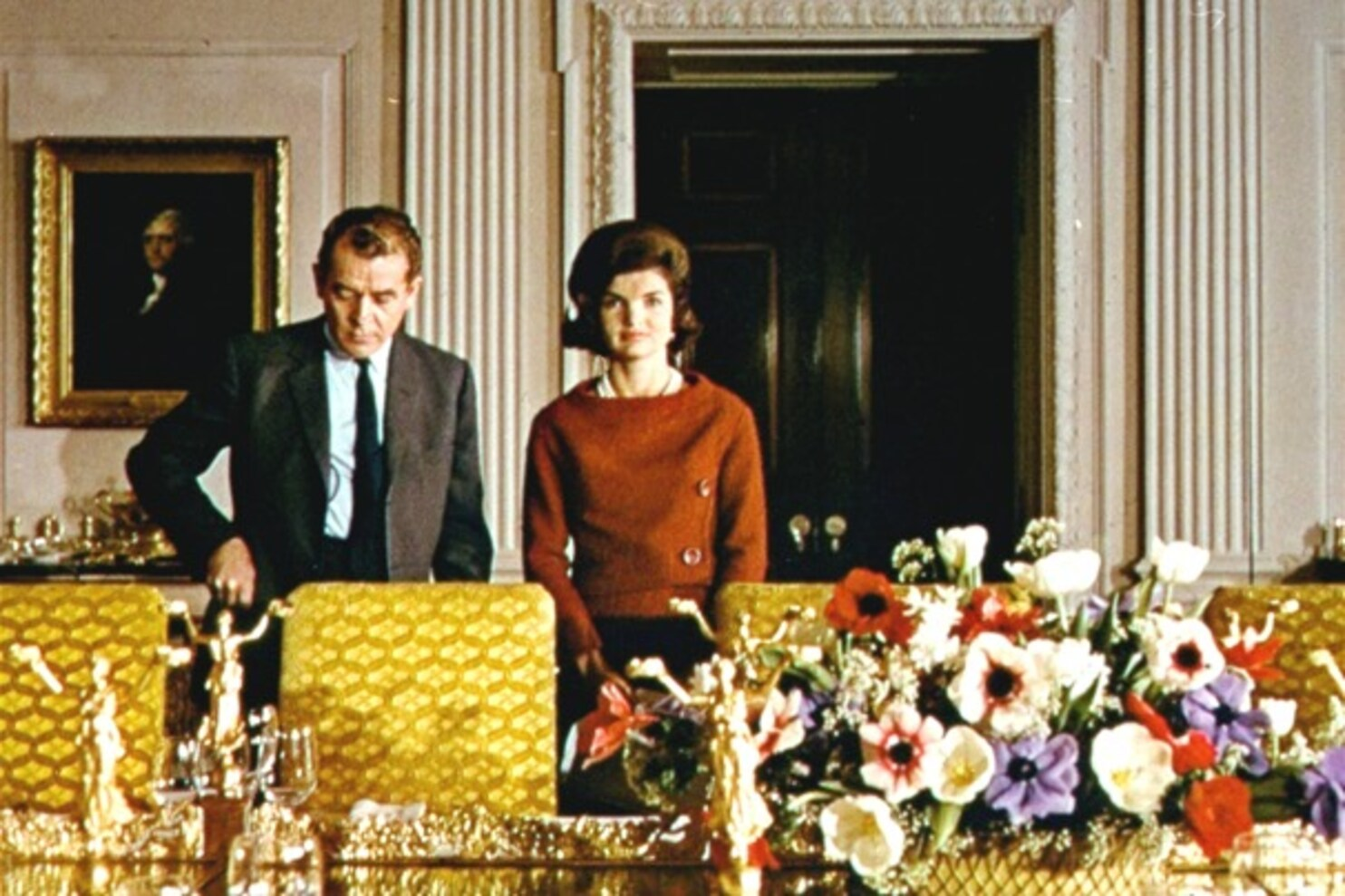
- Collingwood and Kennedy during their tour
- Genre: Documentary/Special
- Written by: Jacqueline Kennedy
- Directed by: Franklin J. Schaffner
- Starring: Jacqueline Kennedy; Charles Collingwood; John F. Kennedy
- Country of origin: United States
- Original language: English
- No. of episodes: 1

Production
- Producer: Perry Wolff

Original release
- Network: CBS; NBC; ABC
- Release: February 14, 1962

A Tour of the White House with Mrs. John F. Kennedy was a television special featuring the first lady of the United States, Jacqueline Kennedy, on a tour of the recently renovated White House. It was broadcast on Valentine's Day, February 14, 1962, on both CBS and NBC, and broadcast four days later on ABC. The program was the first televised tour of the White House by a first lady and is considered the first prime-time documentary specifically designed to appeal to a female audience.

The program showed Kennedy on a tour of the house with CBS News correspondent Charles Collingwood. The videotaped tour was the first glimpse the American public had of the $2 million restoration of the White House that the first lady had helped direct in the first year of her husband's presidency.

The broadcast was seen by more than eighty million viewers and syndicated globally to 50 countries, including China and the Soviet Union.

Notes for the televised tour were among Jacqueline Kennedy's personal papers that were publicly released by the John F. Kennedy Presidential Library in 2012. She specified in those papers that the names of individual donors who had contributed to the costs of the renovation were included in the script.

== Background ==
Kennedy had been the first lady of the United States since the inauguration of her husband John F. Kennedy in January 1961 and had engaged in a well-publicized restoration and redecoration of the president's official residence, the White House, in the first year of her husband's presidency. Kennedy had been approached by various television networks to broadcast the restored White House and it was subsequently agreed that the three major American networks (CBS, NBC and ABC) would jointly fund and broadcast the resultant documentary. The finished documentary was produced by Perry Wolff and directed by the feature film director Franklin J. Schaffner. The orchestra conductor Alfredo Antonini served as the program's musical director. Cutaway segments for the film were shot in advance and Kennedy's parts were taped in an eight-hour recording session. Nine short tons (8.2 t) of equipment were required for the film, placed in the White House by 54 technicians.

External videos
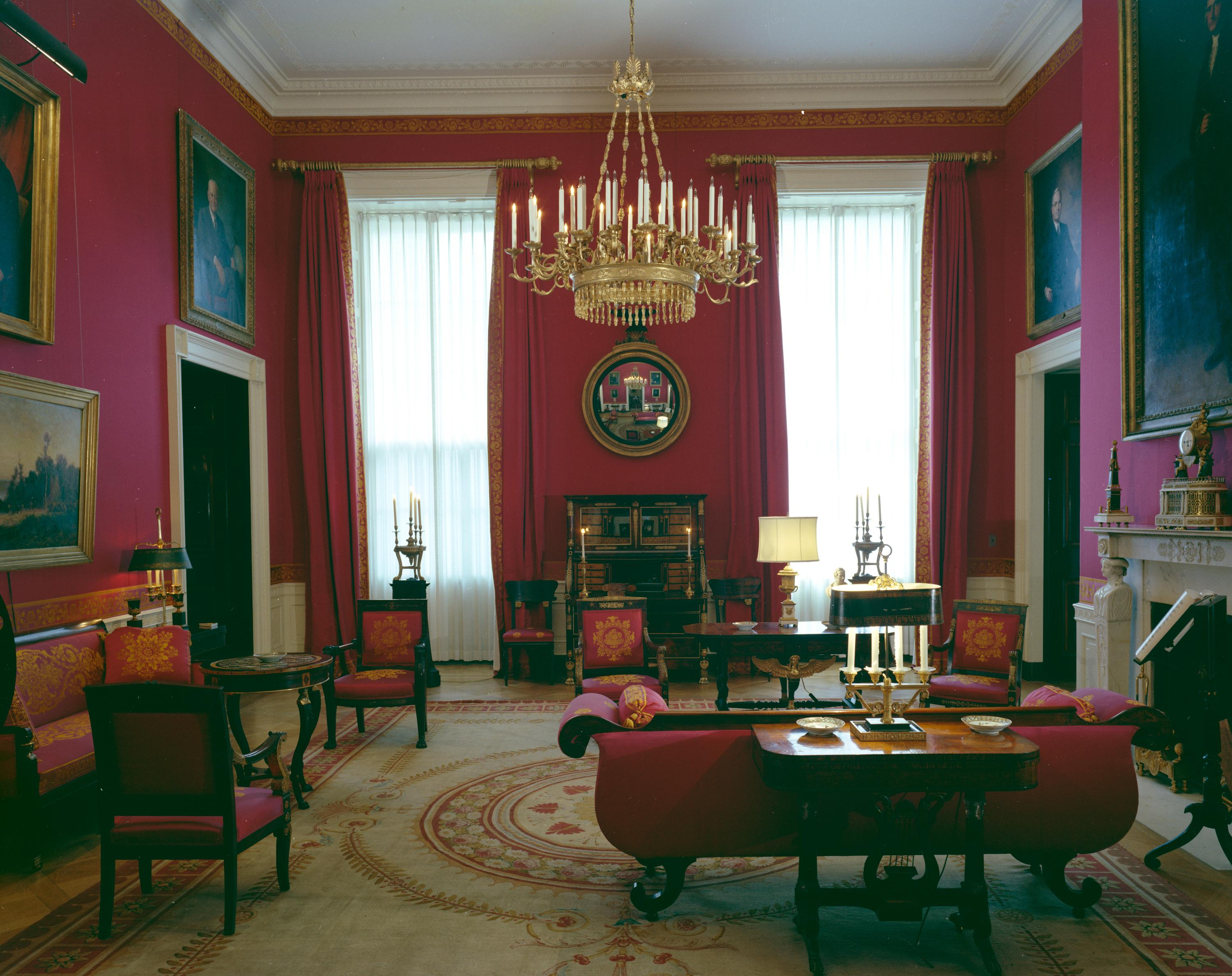
- The Red Room
- From the archives: Jacqueline Kennedy's televised tour of the White House in 1962, CBS, a 55 minute 48 second clip
- 50th Anniversary of the White House Tour with Jacqueline Kennedy, JFK Library, 1:19:43, a half-hour clip starts at 4:01

== Aftermath ==
The success of the film led to other documentaries aimed at a female audience, including The World of Sophia Loren, The World of Jacqueline Kennedy and Elizabeth Taylor in London, all of which drew significant numbers of viewers. The success of the film of Kennedy's White House tour has been analyzed from a feminist film perspective, as it appealed to "women's fantasies about living a more public life while largely maintaining their conventional feminine attributes" as television could allow the female viewer to "fantasize about situations and identities which are not part of one's everyday existence", anticipating the new possibilities for women in the latter part of the 1960s.

The success of the program inspired Grace Kelly, by then Princess of Monaco, to make a filmed tour called A Look at Monaco.

Kennedy and Perry Sidney Wolff co-authored a book with the same title, based on the documentary film, published by Doubleday in 1962.

The film won Schaffner the Directorial Achievement Award for 1962 from the Directors Guild of America, and Schaffner and Kennedy were both recipients of the Trustee's Award from the Academy of Television Arts and Sciences for their work on the film. Schaffner would later be asked by President Kennedy to look at the lighting and acoustics in the State Department's Auditorium, the site of his press conferences, and was asked to help prepare Kennedy for his address to the nation at the start of the Cuban Missile Crisis.
