= List of war correspondents in World War II =

Clark Lee of AP needs to be added.

This is a list of war correspondents in World War II.

== A ==
- James Aldridge, The New York Times

== B ==
- Ralph Barnes, New York Herald Tribune, killed in a plane crash in Yugoslavia in 1940 while on his way to cover Mussolini's invasion of Greece
- Jack Belden, LIFE
- Homer Bigart, New York Herald Tribune
- Bill Boss, The Canadian Press
- Margaret Bourke-White (1904–1971), first American female war photojournalist, photographed Buchenwald concentration camp
- Hal Boyle, Associated Press
- Cecil Brown, CBS
- Lothar-Günther Buchheim, Sonderführer in a propaganda unit of the Kriegsmarine
- Christopher Buckley, The Daily Telegraph
- Wilfred Burchett, Australian war correspondent, first Western journalist to report from Hiroshima after the atomic bombing
- Winston Burdett, CBS Radio Network, one of the Murrow Boys
- Edgar Rice Burroughs, who was in Honolulu at the time of the attack on Pearl Harbor. Became one of the oldest war correspondents ever.

== C ==
- Robert Capa, Collier's, then Life, Hungarian-born American war photographer and photojournalist
- Dickey Chapelle, National Geographic, American photojournalist
- Greg Clarke (1892–1977), Canadian war correspondent
- Alexander Clifford, Daily Mail
- Charles Collingwood, CBS Radio Network, one of the Murrow Boys
- Don Cook, New York Herald Tribune (1920-1995), War correspondent
- Walter Cronkite, United Press

== D ==
- Daniel De Luce, Associated Press
- Richard Dimbleby, the BBC's first war correspondent
- David Divine, The Sunday Times
- Bill Downs, CBS News
- David Douglas Duncan, American photojournalist and combat photographer

== E ==
- Kurt Eggers, World War II SS correspondent, editor of the SS magazine Das Schwarze Korps, killed while reporting on the battles near Kharkov

== G ==
- Martha Gellhorn, Collier's, third wife of fellow war correspondent and writer Ernest Hemingway
- Frank Gervasi, Collier's Weekly
- Frank Gillard, BBC
- Nakayama Gishu, pen name of Japanese war correspondent Yoshihide Takama (1900–1969)
- Henry Tilton Gorrell, United Press
- Tom Grandin, CBS, an original member of the Murrow Boys
- Vasily Grossman, Krasnaya Zvezda, a Russian official newspaper

== H ==
- Matthew Halton, Toronto Star, Canadian Broadcasting Corporation
- Vernon Arnold Haugland, Associated Press. First civilian awarded the Silver Star.
- Thomas Healy, Daily Mirror (North African campaign), New York Post (Anzio and subsequent Italian campaign 1944–1945)
- Macdonald Hastings, Picture Post
- Ernest Hemingway, Collier's
- John Hersey, Newsweekly, Time, Life
- Frank Hewlett, United Press
- Marguerite Higgins, New York Herald Tribune
- Clare Hollingworth, The Daily Telegraph
- Johannes-Matthias Hönscheid, German correspondent who was awarded the Knight's Cross of the Iron Cross
- Richard C. Hottelet, United Press, later CBS. Last surviving member of the Murrow Boys.
- Peggy Hull

== J ==
- Alaric Jacob, Daily Express
- Denis Johnston, BBC
- Philip Jordan, News Chronicle

== K ==
- Clair Kenamore, St. Louis Post-Dispatch
- Ed Kennedy, Associated Press
- Helen Kirkpatrick, Chicago Daily News
- Betty Knox, London Evening Standard

== L ==
- Thomas C. Lea III, Life magazine
- Larry LeSueur, CBS radio correspondent. One of the "Murrow Boys".
- Eric Lloyd Williams, South African Press Association and Reuters
- Jim G. Lucas, Scripps-Howard Newspapers

== M ==
- Alexander Gault MacGowan, The Sun (New York)
- John MacVane, NBC
- Curzio Malaparte, Corriere della Sera, Italian war correspondent
- Michael Maclear, CBC
- Jim McGlincy, United Press
- John MacVane, NBC News
- Drew Middleton, The New York Times
- Alan Moorehead, Daily Express
- Ralph Morse, career staff photographer for Life magazine, noted for his photo of a burnt-out Japanese tank in a clearing with a skull and helmet on the fender
- Joseph Morton, Associated Press, only Allied correspondent to be executed by the Axis during World War II
- Leonard Mosley, Allied Newspapers
- Edward R. Murrow, CBS News. Assembled a team of foreign correspondents for CBS News who became known as the "Murrow Boys".

== N ==
- Ruth Cowan Nash, Associated Press

== O ==
- Sidney A. Olson, Time and Life magazines

== P ==
- Frederick C. Painton (1895–1945), former pulp writer who covered WWII including North Africa and Italy (1943–44), and Iwo Jima (1945). He was the subject of Ernie Pyle's last published column.
- Mary Marvin Breckinridge Patterson, CBS Radio Network, first female member of the Murrow Boys
- George Sessions Perry, Harper's Weekly and the Saturday Evening Post
- William Pidgeon, The Australian Women's Weekly
- Roy Pinney, freelance war photographer who sold to Life, Look, Collier's, Woman's Day and other magazines
- Ernie Pyle, Scripps-Howard Newspapers. Pyle was killed by a machine-gun burst on the island of Iejima in April 1945.

== R ==
- Quentin Reynolds, Collier's Weekly
- John Rich, NBC News
- Inez Robb, International News Service
- Andy Rooney, Stars and Stripes

== S ==
- Frederic Salusbury, Daily Herald
- Sigrid Schultz, Chicago Tribune
- Eric Sevareid, CBS Radio Network, one of the original Murrow Boys
- Robert Sherrod, Time and Life magazines
- Bill Shadel, CBS Radio Network
- Charles Shaw, CBS
- Robert Sherrod, Time and Life magazines
- William L. Shirer, CBS Radio, one of the Murrow Boys, and author of The Rise and Fall of the Third Reich
- Howard K. Smith, CBS Radio, one of the original Murrow Boys
- Donald Starr, Chicago Tribune
- John Steinbeck, New York Herald Tribune
- Edmund Stevens, Christian Science Monitor

== T ==
- Richard Tregaskis, International News Service. Author of Guadalcanal Diary, which was dramatized in the movie of same name.

== V ==
- Wynford Vaughan-Thomas, BBC

== W ==
- Betty Wason, CBS
- Alan Whicker, British Army's Film and Photo Unit
- Osmar White, The Herald and Weekly Times
- Don Whitehead, Associated Press
- Eric Lloyd Williams, Reuters/South African Press Association
- Chester Wilmot, BBC and Australian Broadcasting Corporation
