= Transradio Press Service =

US radio station news service (1934-1951)

Transradio Press Service was founded by Herbert Moore in 1934. Its mission was to supply news to radio stations by teleprinter and shortwave. The service folded in 1951.

== The beginnings ==
After leaving CBS in 1934 Herbert Moore, a former United Press reporter, had the idea to create a dedicated service to provide copy for radio news broadcasts. At that time newspapers saw radio stations as competition for advertising dollars - so much so that when CBS attempted to set up its own news service the major newspaper chains threatened to stop carrying CBS program listings. Accordingly, Press-Radio Bureau, an agency set up by the three major press agencies, Associated Press, United Press, and International News Service, limited the news content they made available to two five-minute broadcasts and intermittent news flashes for major breaking stories. Moore was able to raise $150,000 of start up capital and launch the Transradio Press Service in Manhattan.

When the service began it had 50 radio clients and another 75 clients which received limited news by sending reports written in Morse code over shortwave radio. Some of Transradio's early clients included: KNX in Hollywood, KSTP in St. Paul, the Michigan Network, the Yankee Network in New England, WLS in Chicago, KWK in St. Louis, CFCF in Montreal, and CJRM in Regina, Saskatchewan. Transradio charged different rates for different clients, depending on their market. A station in Casper, Wyoming paid only $15 per week while the Yankee Network paid $1,000 per week.

In October 1934 Moore managed to work out a deal with WOR in Manhattan for $1,500 a week, rising to $5,000 if WOR was able to sell commercials for the bulletins. The deal launched Transradio into the largest radio market in the country.

== Transradio's heyday ==
Within five years the company had 400 radio and newspaper clients and 600 stringers and reporters worldwide. In fact, Transradio's success was influential over the other big news services, Associated Press, United Press and the International News Service. They all soon realized that they had missed the boat with radio coverage and began to peddle their own news to radio stations. This put the squeeze on the upstart Transradio.

By 1940, Transradio was sending news out to hundreds of stations in the U.S. and Canada, distributing foreign news from France's Agence Havas, Britain's Central News Agency, Germany's Trans-Ocean News Service (part of DNB (Deutsche Nachrichten Buro)), British Official Wireless, and its own private sources, including the pioneering foreign correspondent Betty Wason, who started the Czechoslovak bureau in 1938. In 1940, Canadian authorities expressed their ire with commercially sponsored news, which was outlawed in Canada, when Transport Minister Clarence Howe arose in Ottawa's House of Commons and announced the two sponsored news services in Canada, Transradio and British United Press, must "show their news sources to be accurate," or risk losing their licenses on July 1.

Moore went up to Ottawa and claimed there was a plot by "selfish publishing and monopolistic interests ... to destroy independent news services throughout the Dominion." As the licenses were set to expire the Canadian Broadcasting Corporation, whose own unsponsored news came from Canadian Press, reversed the decision and agreed to let Transradio transmit indefinitely.

Herbert Moore left Transradio in 1942 for the publishing business and his brother, Robert Moore, took over as president.

== The end of an era ==
Transradio folded in 1951 with only 50 clients and 25 staff left.
