= Ben Maclennan =

South African writer and journalist (born 1956)

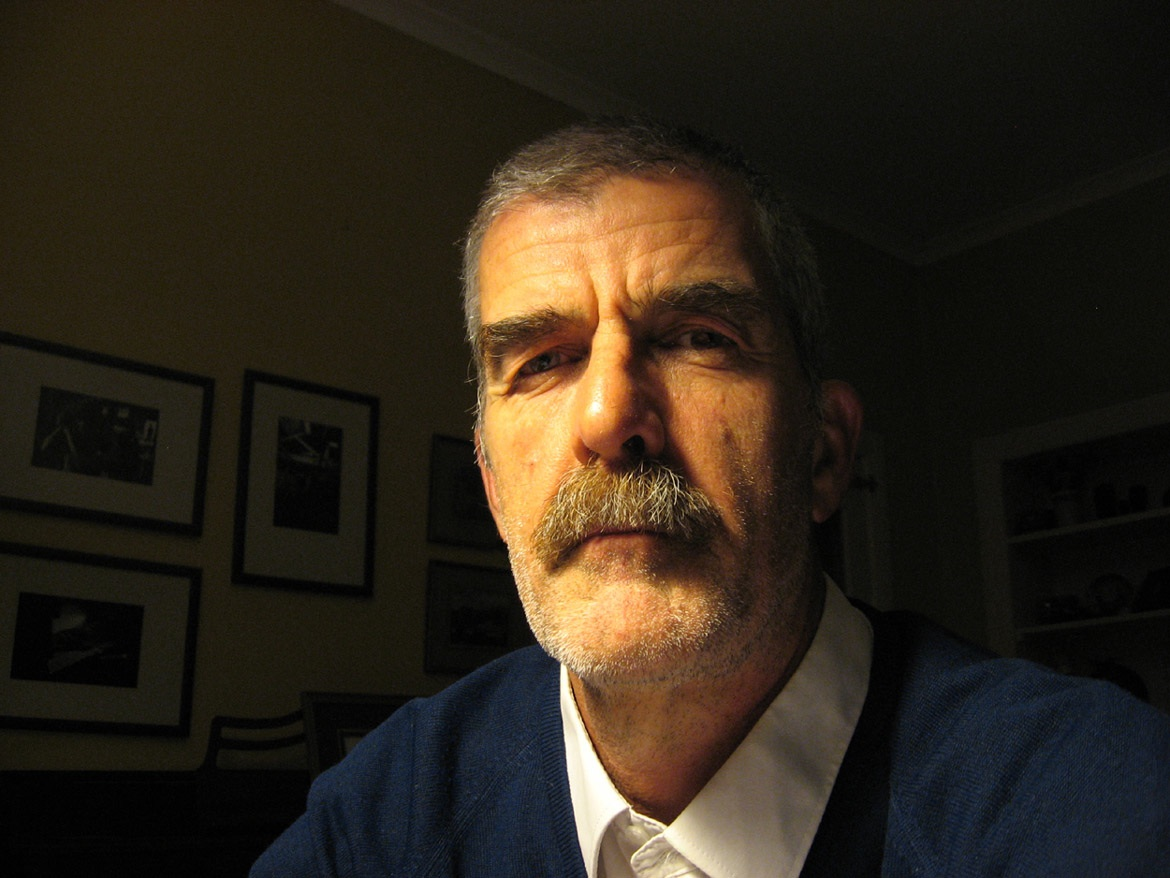
- Born: 1956 (age 69–70)
- Occupations: Author; journalist
- Spouse(s): Kate Skinner; Martine Barker
- Children: 3

Ben Maclennan (born 1956) is a South African author and journalist.

He spends his time between Cape Town, South Africa, where he was formerly regional editor for the South African Press Association (SAPA) and the Eastern Cape.

== Education ==
Maclennan received his early schooling in Grahamstown, South Africa, where his parents were associated with Rhodes University. He registered at university twice, once at University of Natal, Pietermaritzburg (1975) and once at Rhodes University, Grahamstown (1976), but did not graduate either time.

== Career ==
Maclennan was launched on a career in journalism by a 1975 position on the East London Daily Dispatch which was then under the editorship of Donald Woods. In late 1976 he secured a photojournalist position on the Rhodesia Herald, based in Salisbury (later Harare), Rhodesia until the 1979 downfall of the Ian Smith government. At that time, he returned to Grahamstown, Eastern Cape, South Africa with his then wife, Kate Skinner, a librarian, artist and minor poet and their son Seamus. In the Eastern Cape, Ben worked as a reporter for the Eastern Province Herald, with headquarters in Port Elizabeth, and an office in Grahamstown. In the mid-eighties he moved to Cape Town and has worked for SAPA as a journalist, for a number of years. Besides his firstborn, Seamus, he has two further sons, David and Simon from a second marriage to journalist and author Martine Barker.

=== Books ===
- A Proper Degree of Terror—a history of the British campaign on the Eastern Frontier
- Apartheid: The Lighter Side—a book which passed its message through humor
- Glenmore: The story of a forced removal—removal, apartheid's physical separation
- The wind makes dust—a travel anthology of Southern Africa

=== Selected articles ===
- IOL : The long march to Sandton
- IOL : Tsvangirai called off Zim talks - Lekota
- IOL : 'Nothing sinister' in Mogae's Bushmen visit
- Sunday Times : 'Spies must be investigated'
- Sunday Times : Taxis 'linked to rail sabotage'
- The Herald : Cradock ‘apostle’ dreams up ‘Aids cure’
