= El Salvador–Manchukuo relations =

- El Salvador: Manchukuo

El Salvador recognized Manchukuo in 1934, becoming the second state after the Empire of Japan to do so. However, apart from the formal recognition, there was little interaction between the two countries. The recognition was revoked in 1943 as El Salvador had sided with the Allies in World War II.

== Background ==
After the Japanese invasion of Manchuria in 1931, the puppet state of Manchukuo was created in 1932. On February 27, 1933 the League of Nations voted 42–1 to condemn Japanese military occupation of Manchuria. Japan was the lone dissenter, with Siam abstaining and 13 other nations absent. El Salvador was one of the absentee countries during the vote.

== El Salvador recognizes Manchukuo ==
On May 21, 1934 the Manchukuo Legation in Tokyo announced El Salvador formally had recognized Manchukuo on March 3, 1934. This made El Salvador the second state to recognize the Manchukuo Empire, after Japan. In the Note of Recognition of May 19, 1934 of the Salvadoran Consul General León Sigüenza, addressed to Minister of Manchukuo in Tokyo General Tinge Shih Yuan, Sigüenza stated that "[t]he step taken by my government is the first action taken by any American nation for the sake of peace in the Far East and El Salvador looks forward to an infinite strengthening of the relations thus inaugurated by the establishment of commercial relations between the two nations.". In parallel to the Note of Recognition, a Memorandum was handed over by Sigüenza which affirmed that Manchukuo subjects would be given free entry to El Salvador (in spite of El Salvador immigration laws prohibiting Chinese and Mongolians to enter the country).

The Japanese press was jubilant following the announcement, with the leading newspaper Tokyo Asahi stating that "the league's principle of nonrecognition of Manchukuo is crumbling". Japan Foreign Office officials were quoted by Reuters stating that the Salvadoran recognition of Manchukuo constituted "one of the high lights of international history and is worthy to be long remembered". There were reports that discussed that a Salvadoran consulate would be opened in Manchukuo. In Tokyo, Sigüenza was bestowed gifts by Japanese nationalist associations.

The government of China denounced the recognition of Manchukuo, stating that El Salvador had "broken international faith" and called on the League of Nations to pass strong sanctions on El Salvador. The Salvadoran Manchukuo recognition and the Chinese reaction marked the most high-profile political event of Chinese-Latin American diplomacy of the 1930s.

Responding to reports of possible expulsion from the League of Nations, Foreign Minister Miguel Ángel Araujo defended the decision to recognize Manchukuo and stated that the League of Nations had been of no benefit to El Salvador. Sigüenza issued a statement on May 24, 1934 arguing that "[i]n regard to the recognition of a Government there is explicit provision in the Constitution of my country. It is one of our sovereign rights which cannot be restricted by any treaty or agreement. The bureaucratic policy of the League of Nations is influenced by the representatives of a few States, whose attitude was animated by the desire of satisfying their personal vanity. Therefore it has been prejudiced into an irrational and unjuridical attitude toward China. The recognition of Manchukuo by my country is the exercise of our sovereign rights, of which we can not be deprived by the fact that my country is a Member of the League of Nations."

=== Interpretations ===
The move to recognize Manchukuo by El Salvador was largely unexpected and there was speculation regarding the underlying motivations. For years a story circulated which argued that the entire affair had risen from a mistake, that a junior staffer of the Ministry of Foreign Affairs had responded to a communication on the coronation of Emperor Kang Teh on March 1, 1934 without understanding the wider implications at play. There were also speculations in international media that El Salvador had wished to open up the Japanese market for coffee exports. El Salvador had approached Japan to request exportation of coffee, but no such developments would take place.

== Later developments ==
Until the Italian recognition in 1937, Manchukuo was only recognized by Japan, El Salvador and the Vatican.

In June 1934 El Salvador was badly affected by a major hurricane, after which the Manchukuo government announced the possibility of sending aid to El Salvador, and its Foreign Minister Xie Jieshi sent a cable to his counterpart Araujo to express sympathy. In July 1934 a cheque of 10,000 Japanese yen was delivered via the Manchukuo Legation in Tokyo to the Salvadoran Consul General for hurricane relief, as a personal contribution of Emperor Kang Teh. In September 1934, a large Japanese delegation visited El Salvador to express gratitude over the recognition of Manchukuo.

In 1936 Japan rejected a Soviet proposal for a committee to resolve the Manchukuo-Soviet border issue, asking that either El Salvador or Estonia be included in the committee as its third impartial member.

In June 1938 the Trans-Ocean News Service reported that a twenty-member Manchukuo propaganda delegation was set to visit El Salvador (the report also stated that the delegation would visit Siam, Poland, Germany, Italy and the nationalist-controlled parts of Spain).

In September 1938 Emperor Kang Teh decorated Salvadoran President General Maximiliano Hernández Martínez, Foreign Minister Araujo, Consul General Sigüenza and the Under-Secretary at the Tokyo Consulate Arturo Ramón Ávila.

El Salvador signed the Declaration by United Nations issued on January 1, 1942. On January 27, 1943, the government of El Salvador withdrew its recognition of Manchukuo.
