= The Bangkok Times =

Defunct newspaper in Bangkok, Thailand

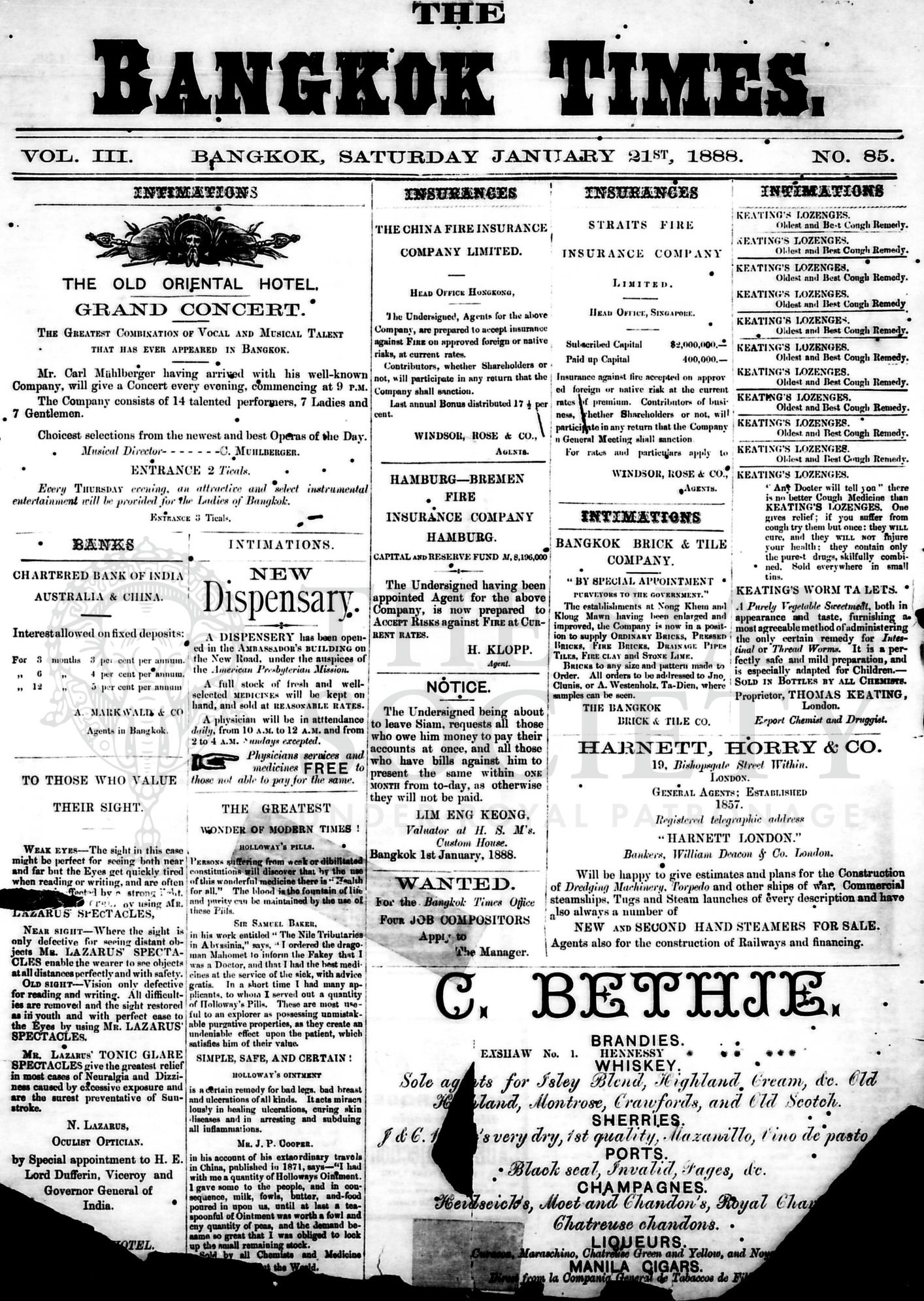
- 21 January 1888 issue of The Bangkok Times
- Type: Weekly newspaper (1887–1890); Semi-weekly newspaper (1891–1894); Triweekly newspaper (1894–1895); Daily (except Sunday) newspaper (1896–1942)
- Publisher: Mr. W. H. Mundie
- Editor: Mr. W. H. Mundie
- Founded: January 1887
- Ceased publication: 30 September 1942
- Language: English
- Headquarters: Bangkok, Thailand

The Bangkok Times (Thai: บางกอกไตมส์) was the longest-running English-language newspaper in Bangkok until World War II. It was founded by Mr. T. Lloyd Williamese in January 1887. In July 1892, Mr. Charles Thorne was editor and co-proprietor of the newspaper and remained its proprietor up to at least July 1908. In 1908, it comprised eight pages and contained forty-eight columns. In March 1932, Mr. W. H. Mundie was described as the "veteran editor of The Bangkok Times", newspaper for which he worked since at least 1904. In June 1941, King George VI conferred the decoration of an Officer of the Order of the British Empire upon Mr. W. H. Mundie as Editor of the Bangkok Times. The British owned newspaper was placed under Japanese supervision at the beginning of December 1941 after the Japanese invasion of Thailand and a German editor formerly connected with Trans-Ocean news agency was installed. It ceased publication less than a year later on 30 September 1942.

A weekly edition for subscribers living in the provinces and abroad was published from 1897 until 6 December 1941 entitled The Bangkok Times Weekly Mail. Unlike the daily version that had a significant part of each issue devoted to advertisements and no single news item on the front page, the weekly version was almost totally devoid of any advertisements. For subscribers living in Thailand, a 'Special Telegram Supplement' containing all foreign cables received during the week was included. Starting from Wednesday 14 May 1930 (Volume XXXIV, No. 20, published on Monday 19 May 1930), most issues of The Bangkok Times Weekly Mail contained one or more pages with several pictures usually entitled "The News in Pictures" that could sometimes be printed on both sides of the page. The pages with pictures were larger than the pages with only text (212 mm x 320 mm for pages with text and 410 mm x 557 mm for pages with pictures).^{[a]}

== See also ==
- Timeline of English-language newspapers published in Thailand
- List of online newspaper archives - Thailand

== Notes ==
^{a} Measurements were made on the issue of The Bangkok Times Weekly Mail published on Monday 19 May 1930.
