= Eric Lloyd Williams =

South African-born journalist and war correspondent

Eric Lloyd Williams (1915–1988) was a South African-born journalist and war correspondent who covered World War II for the South African Press Association and Reuters.

Eric Lloyd Williams in North Africa

Lloyd Williams reported on the North African campaign of the British Eighth Army, which included troops from India, South Africa, Australia and New Zealand, among others. He covered the fall of Tobruk in June 1942 and El Alamein, the pivotal battle later in the year that turned the tide in favour of the Allies in North Africa.

In 1943, Lloyd Williams entered the Libyan capital, Tripoli, a key Axis base, on 23 January, the day the Eighth Army captured it from the Germans. In May 1943, he entered Tunis six hours after it fell to the Allies, with the surrender of all German and Italian forces in North Africa. Four months later he was with the Eighth Army when it invaded the South of Italy from Sicily.

He earned the nickname Benghazi while reporting from North Africa. The Libyan port of Benghazi, a vital supply town, changed hands several times during the course of the fighting in 1941–42.

In 1944 the Argus newspaper in Cape Town called Lloyd Williams "the outstanding South African war correspondent of this war".

In his obituary in 1988, the Herald newspaper in Port Elizabeth described him as "South Africa's most distinguished war correspondent of the Second World War".

== Best news story of 1943 ==
News story of the year award, 1943

Lloyd Williams won the South African Society of Journalists trophy for the best news story of 1943 for a report on a dash through no man's land that he and two other correspondents made in Italy in September that year. In his war journal he identifies one of the other correspondents as Daniel De Luce of Associated Press but does not name the third.

The three men borrowed an army jeep and drove 160 km from the Eighth Army spearhead at Nicastro to the headquarters of the American Fifth Army in Salerno, to the north. The journey took two days and nights. At the time the Fifth Army was meeting stiff German resistance and struggling to break out of its Salerno beachhead. The Eighth Army had assumed the role of a relief force.

At first the correspondents believed army vehicles were ahead of them. When they realised this was not so, they considered turning back. "But no - curiosity prevails and we decide almost together to push ahead and see around a few corners," Lloyd Williams wrote in his journal.

He described the terrain they travelled through as "wild hill country steep above the sea where there is a great feeling of loneliness". But there were little towns too, including the seaside village of Maratea, where they were welcomed with grapes and wine. They pressed on towards Salerno.

== Arrival at Fifth Army headquarters ==
Lloyd Williams in the North African desert

Reaching the American perimeter on 15 September, they were greeted with surprise and excitement. The territory they had passed through was thought to be in enemy hands; Italy had surrendered on 3 September but German forces controlled much of the country. One report says the correspondents were initially arrested as suspected enemy spies, although Lloyd Williams does not confirm this in his war journal. Once their identities had been established, the three correspondents reported to headquarters, providing information that helped the two armies to link up. They met General Harold Alexander, commander of the Allied armies in Italy, who shook their hands and told them, "Gentlemen, you have done something I would not have liked to attempt." That evening Lloyd Williams wrote: "Tonight the news of our arrival is all over the bridgehead area. The effect on the troops is wonderful. Everywhere they are saying, 'Well the Eighth Army's here.'"

The following day, 16 September, advance elements of the Eighth Army made contact with Fifth Army patrols outside Salerno, ending what one historian described as the first great crisis of the Italian campaign.

== Reprimand from military authorities ==
The Allied Forces Headquarters Public Relations Office responded by reprimanding the three correspondents for going ahead of vanguard combat troops and endangering lives.

"It is undeniable that their recent journey might have resulted in the complete elimination of the whole party," Col. J V McCormack wrote in a letter circulated to war correspondents and army public relations officers, dated 28 September.

"One determined machine gunner could have obliterated them in less time than it takes to dictate this."

He added that "escapades of this nature necessitate constantly leaving the road and taking cars over rough country", placing an unnecessary strain on transport at a time when the chances of getting vehicles replaced were nil. He deplored the actions of the correspondents.

However, the colonel conceded that the three men had gathered valuable information:

"It has been recorded in a memorandum submitted by three correspondents that they carried out a very fine reconnaissance, for which the authorities were extremely grateful. I do not doubt this was the case..."

== Response from employers ==
Lloyd Williams' employers were more appreciative. Walton Cole of Reuters cabled him: "Best thanks for dispatch...That Reuter correspondent should be one prove personal enterprise still possible war corresponding gives great pride. FYI your dispatch incame London hours ahead others."

The editor of the Cape Times congratulated him not only on the exploit but on his report of the journey, which he said all newspapers had carried prominently.

== Early career ==
Rhodesia Herald cricket team, 1938. Lloyd Williams back row, fourth from left

Of Welsh descent, Lloyd Williams was born in Cape Town on 30 August 1915. He was educated at South African College Schools (SACS) in Cape Town, Grey High School in Port Elizabeth and the University of Cape Town. He began his career in journalism in 1938 when he joined the Argus in Cape Town. A year later he joined the Western Mail in Cardiff, Wales. He also had a stint on the Rhodesia Herald in Salisbury before joining the South African Press Association (Sapa) as a parliamentary reporter.

== Post-war career ==
After the war, Lloyd Williams opened a North American bureau for Sapa in Washington DC, where he worked from 1946 to 1949. In 1949 he became a public relations officer for the South African Chamber of Mines.

In the 1950s, he and fellow journalist John Sutherland produced Africa X-Ray Report, a monthly newsletter that reported on political and other trends in Africa, including the growing tide of African nationalism. The newsletter was described as being "decades ahead of its time".

In 1957, Lloyd Williams joined the Anglo American Corporation as public relations consultant, working initially in Johannesburg. The corporation posted him to Salisbury, Southern Rhodesia in 1961, Lusaka, Zambia in 1964 and finally London in 1966. He edited the corporation’s quarterly magazine, Optima, writing in-depth articles on African countries including Malawi, Mozambique and Rhodesia. He retired in 1975 and settled in Romsey, Hampshire, where he died in February 1988 after a long illness.

He and his wife, Peggy, who died in 2001, were married for 46 years. They had three sons.

== Excerpts from war journal ==
=== Dust storm, Libya, 1943 ===
3 January: A violent dust storm blows all today, carried along in a fierce ice-cold wind from the direction of the German lines west of Buerat...

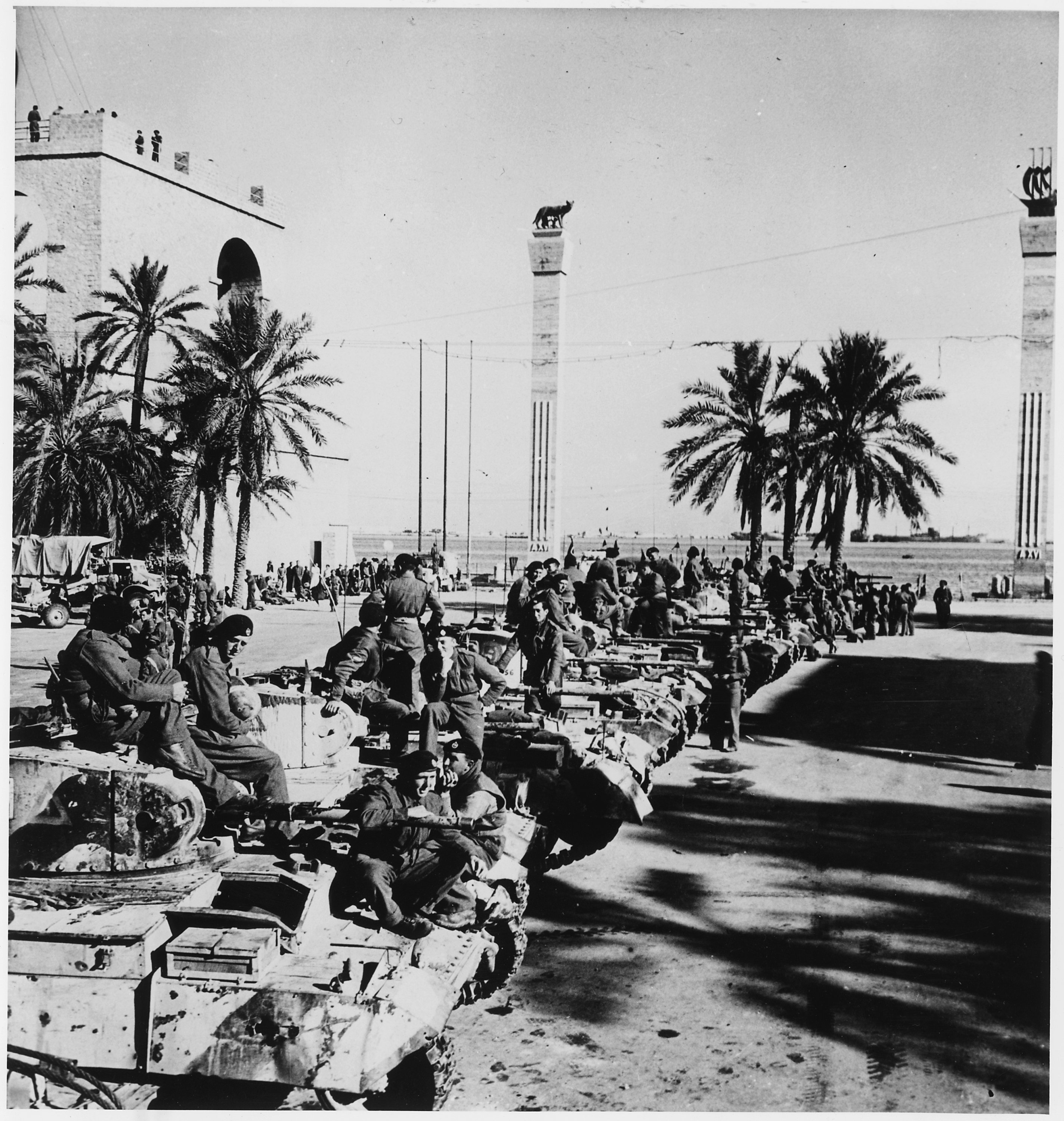
British tanks and crews line up on Tripoli's waterfront after capturing the city, 1943.

4 January: The dust storm which started yesterday increases its force today and life is pretty miserable. Dust has penetrated everywhere. It boils around in our tent, filling my bed, getting in my ears, eyes, mouth and down my back, and seeping all over my papers in the dispatch case. Outside it travels in hard hitting gusts, sailing past us to the sea where it hangs on the horizon, depressing and gloomy.

...The front is still quiet but about 1,000 enemy lorries are sighted moving south from the Misurata area and the enemy has strengthened his northern sector by a few more 88mms among the marshes.

=== Entering Tripoli with victorious Allied forces, January 1943 ===
22 January:

We camp the night in a field 30 miles from Tripoli, right next door to Montgomery himself.

23 January:

We enter Tripoli today. Our armoured cars got in at first light and we reached it soon after 9.30, coming in from the east and driving at one time along part of the famous grand prix circuit at Mellaha. Along here, too, come Valentine tanks and hordes of lorries. We get a great reception from the Arabs who line the streets on the way into the centre of the town, clapping and saluting.

Tripoli is the usual Italian colonial town with a fine waterfront and dingy back quarters. There is not much bomb damage away from the docks but the bay is filled with wreckage and sunken ships including a hospital steamer, hit by bombs.

== Descriptions of fellow war correspondents ==
Lloyd Williams in the early 1970s

In a national broadcast on South African radio in February 1944, Lloyd Williams described some of the war correspondents he worked alongside in North Africa and Italy.

Richard Dimbleby, BBC: "He got caught up in a stupid army arrangement which insisted that he stayed at headquarters and wrote only what the general staff approved. Richard grumbled and complained. Then he went home…Make no mistake, Richard Dimbleby is a very courageous and a very gifted war reporter…you’ll be hearing him again, on his own terms, before the year is much older."

Philip Jordan, News Chronicle: "One of the world’s great correspondents. He would certainly have been one of King Arthur’s knights if he had lived in those days."

Norman Soong, Central News Agency of China: "He came straight from Chungking to cover the Eighth Army for the Chinese press. He didn’t have much in common with the rest of us except his hatred for any form of Fascism and his determination that the war should end with the defeat of Germany and Japan."

Nestor Solodovnik, TASS News Agency, Moscow: "Today he is a Russian general, and a pretty efficient one at that. But only yesterday, it seems, he was sharing a jeep with me in Tunisia."

John Gunther: American journalist and author: "We used to call him the ‘Kentucky Colonel’ because he looked like the typical Southern colonel as Hollywood presented him…His pockets bulge with slips of paper and thick notebooks, and he is forever recording everything of importance he hears."

Quentin Reynolds, Collier's Weekly: "He wore an American Air Force cap that looked as though it belonged on a New York traffic cop. His face was always red and hearty. His jacket was always open. His belt was always fighting a losing fight to keep his ample stomach under control. He went in with the American Navy at Salerno, and when he came back he said, 'Those guys are terrific. I’m a cynic but they break my heart.'"

Frank Gervasi, Collier's Weekly: "He went round Italy speaking fluent Italian to bootblacks and waiters who abound in southern Italy, asking them about Fascism. (He said:) 'You can keep your Mussolinis and your Grand Fascist Council. These are the guys that have to make a go of things. You’ve got to get down to earth.'"

Robert Dunnett, BBC: "Has red hair, a melancholy face with kindly eyes. He’s rather short. You just can’t help loving the man. His heart is the size of a giant’s and there’s no one in Algiers he hasn’t done a kind turn for at some time or another."

Frank Gillard, BBC: "Works very hard and has no pretensions. He insists on driving his own recording truck about the front, and he stays up all night for the sake of getting an authentic recording of an artillery barrage."

Christopher Buckley, Daily Telegraph: "He tells everyone, even his best friends, that he always wanted to be a bishop because of the peace it would bring him, and also because he fancied himself in gaiters...He’s a great journalist."

John Steinbeck, American author: "Came out to Algiers to write about the ordinary people in the army. He used to come over to the war correspondents, all apologetic, because he said he felt he was a sham as a writer. Honest, sincere John Steinbeck."

== See also ==
- War correspondents 1942-43
