= Seymour Topping =

American journalist (1921–2020)

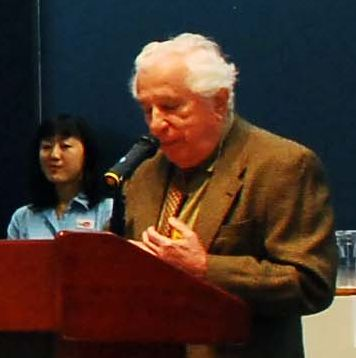
- Topping at the Reynolds Journalism Institute (2008)
- Born: Seymour Topolsky; December 11, 1921; New York City, New York, U.S.
- Died: November 8, 2020 (aged 98); White Plains, New York, U.S.
- Education: University of Missouri School of Journalism
- Occupations: Journalist, author, and professor
- Spouse: Audrey Ronning (m. 1948)
- Children: 5
- Writing career
- Language: English
- Notable works: On the Front Lines of the Cold War; Journey Between Two Chinas

Seymour Topping (December 11, 1921 – November 8, 2020) was an American journalist best known for his work as a foreign correspondent covering wars in China, Korea, Vietnam, Laos, and Cambodia, and the Cold War in Europe. From 1969 to 1986, he was the second senior-most editor at The New York Times. At the time of his death, he was the San Paolo Professor Emeritus of International Journalism at Columbia University, where he also served as administrator of the Pulitzer Prizes from 1993 to 2002.

== Early life ==
Topping was born as Seymour Topolsky on December 11, 1921, in Harlem. His father, Joseph, and mother, Anna (Seidman), were Russian Jewish immigrants. He grew up in Queens and The Bronx and graduated from Evander Childs High School in the latter borough in 1939. He went on to receive his undergraduate degree in journalism from the University of Missouri School of Journalism in 1943.

== Career ==
Topping was a member of the Reserve Officers' Training Corps and served as a United States Army infantry officer in the Philippines during World War II. After this stint with the army, he joined the International News Service in Manila, and was assigned to China to cover the civil war in that region. He went on to join the Associated Press in 1948 as a foreign correspondent in China and Southeast Asia. In 1949, while covering the civil war, he was taken a prisoner by the advancing communist forces in Nanjing and was released when the nationalist forces surrendered. In the 1950s, he reported on the Korean War, and also was the first U.S. correspondent in Vietnam since World War II, where he covered the French colonial war against the communist forces led by Ho Chi Minh.

He joined The New York Times in 1959. Over the next 34 years, he held a variety of positions, including metropolitan reporter, Moscow and Southeast Asia bureau chief, foreign editor, assistant managing editor (1969–1976), deputy managing editor (1976), and managing editor (1977–1986). From 1969 onward, he was noted for being second only to executive editor A. M. Rosenthal. His partnership with Rosenthal was credited with many innovations at the newspaper, including the introduction of feature sections and magazine supplements, facilitating unprecedented commercial success. Following a reorganization of the company by Arthur Ochs Sulzberger in 1985, Topping became director of editorial development for The New York Times Company in 1987. In this position, his mandate was to focus on improving the journalistic quality of the then 32 regional associate newspapers owned by the Times Company.

During Topping's time as the Moscow bureau chief, he covered the U-2 spy incident (1960), the Sino-Soviet split (early 1960s), the Soviet space program (early 1960s), and the Cuban Missile Crisis (1962). Later, as Southeast Asian bureau chief from 1963 to 1966, he covered the Vietnam War, the Laotian Civil War, and the Cambodian Civil War. Some of the key events that he covered therein include; the Chinese Communist Revolution, the First Indochina War, and the Cold War in Europe.

In 1993, he left The New York Times to join the Pulitzer Prize Board as its secretary and administrator. He held this position until his retirement in 2002. He also taught at the Columbia University Graduate School of Journalism as the San Paolo Professor of International Journalism from 1994 to 2002.

Topping served as the president of emeritus Professors at Columbia, president of the American Society of Newspaper Editors (1992–1993), president of the International Advisory Board of the School of Journalism at Tsinghua University, and chairman of the ASNE's Committee on International Communication. He was also a member of the National Committee on United States–China Relations, the Council on Foreign Relations, the Asia Society, and the Century Association. New York Times journalist Robert D. McFadden stated that Topping was "one of the most accomplished foreign correspondents of his generation and a newsroom leader under the renowned executive editor A. M. Rosenthal." John Daniszewski of the Associated Press described Topping as "among the most accomplished foreign correspondents of his generation for the Associated Press and The New York Times."

== Personal life ==
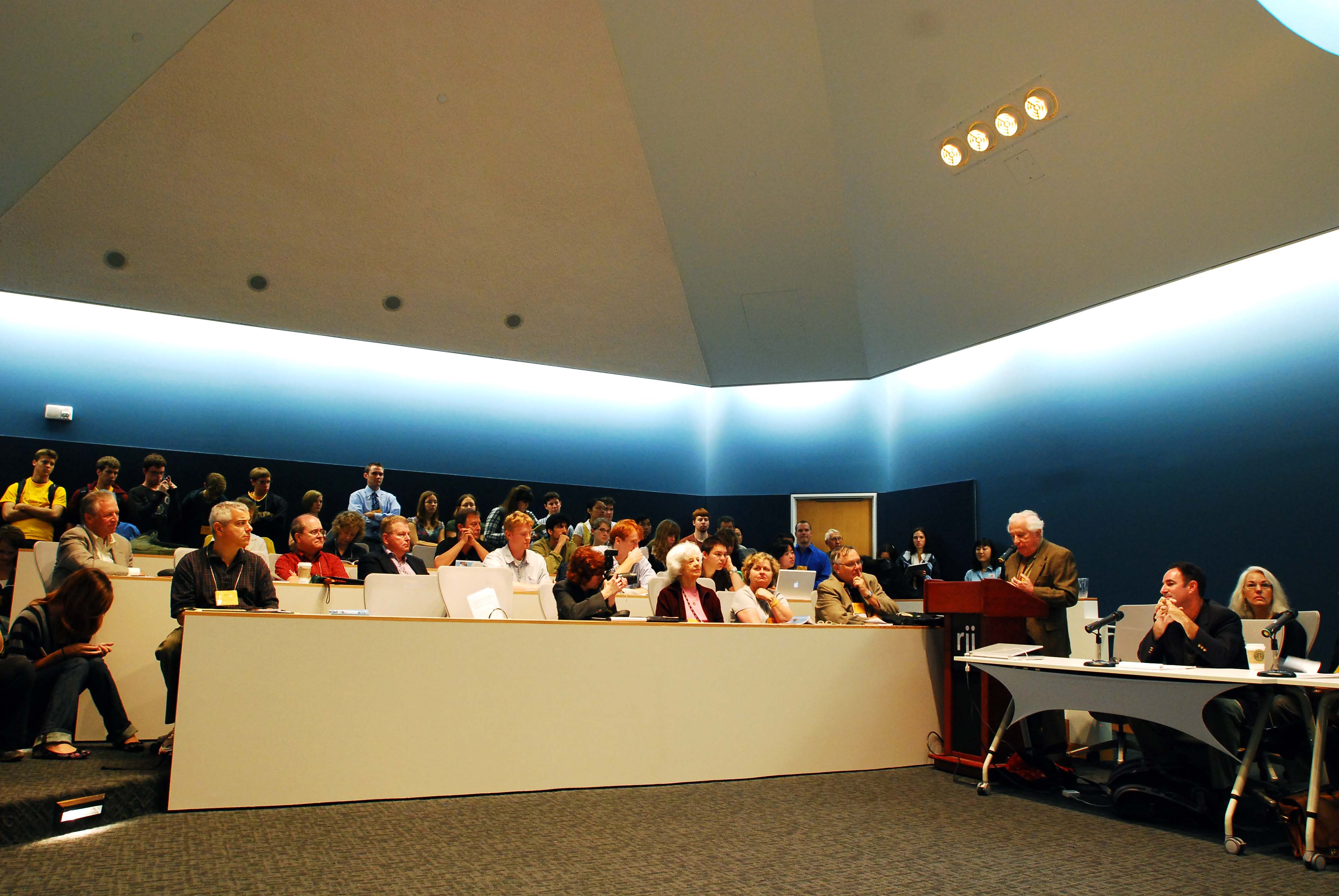
Seymour Topping gives an introduction on "The Pulitzer prize and the Quality of American Journalism".

He was married to photojournalist, documentary filmmaker, and author Audrey Ronning Topping (the daughter of Canadian diplomat Chester Ronning) on November 10, 1948; they had five children. From 1967 until his death, they lived in Scarsdale, New York. One of their daughters, Susan, died of cancer in October 2015.

Topping died on November 8, 2020, in White Plains, New York, at age 98, from a stroke.

== Works ==
- On the Front Lines of the Cold War: An American Correspondent's Journal from the Chinese Civil War to the Cuban Missile Crisis and Vietnam (2010). Baton Rouge: Louisiana State University Press. ISBN 9780807137307
- Journey Between Two Chinas (1972). New York: Harper & Row. ISBN 9780060143299
- The Peking Letter: A Novel of the Chinese Civil War (1999). New York: PublicAffairs. ISBN 9781891620355
- Fatal Crossroads: A Novel of Vietnam 1945 (based partly on the experiences of OSS officer A. Peter Dewey) (2005). White Plains: Signature Books. ISBN 978-1891936692

Articles by Topping and his wife were included in The New York Times Report from Red China (New York: Quadrangle Books, 1971).
