= Inez Robb =

American journalist (1900–1979)

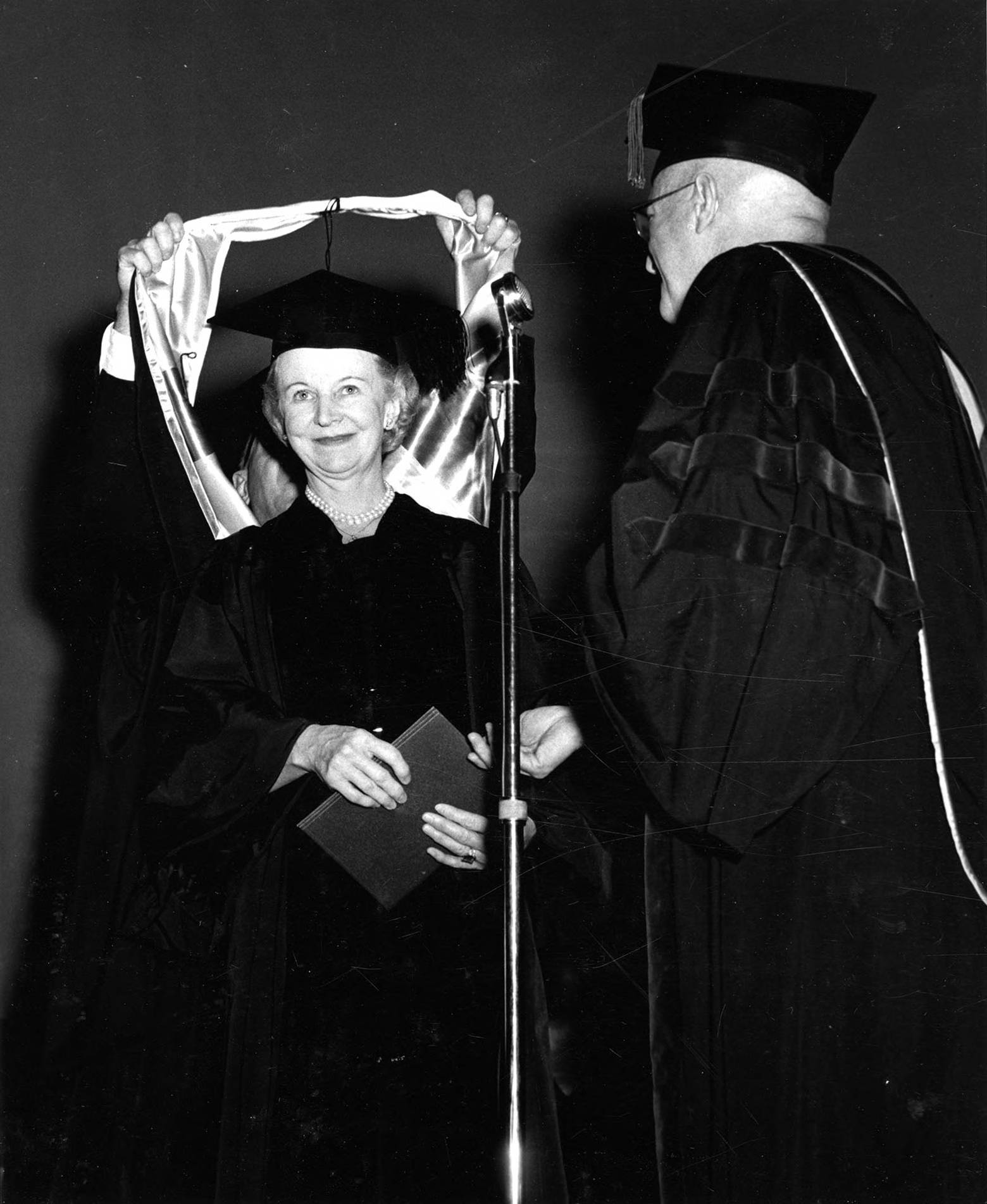
- Robb in 1959
- Born: Inez Early Callaway; November 1900; Middletown, California, U.S.
- Died: April 4, 1979 (aged 78); Tucson, Arizona, U.S.
- Occupation: Journalist
- Years active: 1922–1969
- Spouse: Addison Robb (m. 1929; died 1979)

Inez Early Robb (née Callaway; November 1900 – April 4, 1979) was an American journalist and war correspondent. During the height of her career, she was a household name and one of the highest paid female reporters by 1938, writing a syndicated column that was carried by 140 newspapers.

She worked for roughly two years as a general assignment reporter for the Tulsa Daily World until she was offered a position as an assistant editor for the Sunday section of the New York Daily News. She became the paper's society editor in 1928, a position that she held until 1938, when she joined the International News Service (INS). Robb wrote the column "Assignment America" until the beginning of World War II, when she became an accredited war correspondent, reporting on the work of the Women's Auxiliary Army Corps in the North African campaign. After the war, she continued to write her column for INS until November 1953, when she began working as a columnist for Scripps-Howard and United Feature Syndicate.

== Early life ==
Robb was born Inez Early Callaway in November 1900 on a cattle ranch in Middletown, California. Her grandfathers had moved to California during the California Gold Rush and her father worked in the fruit packing industry. She had two younger siblings, Stephen and Cathryn. During Callaway's childhood, the family moved to her grandparents' ranch near Caldwell, Idaho. She attended high school in Boise, where she lived with her aunt and uncle, and applied to the Boise Daily Capital to be their high school correspondent as a sophomore. Although the editor wanted a boy, she told him that she would do as well as a boy and was hired. Callaway wrote for the paper for the next couple years, copy-editing and preparing the society notes. Her first byline was for the Daily Capital in 1916, when she wrote about her experience as a passenger in a stunt plane at the Idaho State Fair.

In 1918, Callaway began studying journalism at the University of Idaho on a full scholarship. While at the university, she wrote for two local papers in Moscow, Idaho, partially due to her aunt's connections in the area. She joined a university committee to advocate for ratification of the 19th amendment in the state legislature. She also joined the Delta Gamma sorority. After two years, she transferred to the University of Missouri, where she graduated with a journalism degree in 1922.

== Career ==
After graduation, Callaway moved back to Idaho and took positions with the Idaho Daily Statesman and the Nampa Free Press as a reporter. In 1924, she applied for a position with the Tulsa Daily World and was hired as a general assignment reporter because most of the reporters were ill with the flu. She was only able to retain her job because her editor advocated for her to the owner of the paper, and she ended up staying for 27 months.

=== New York Daily News (1926–1938) ===
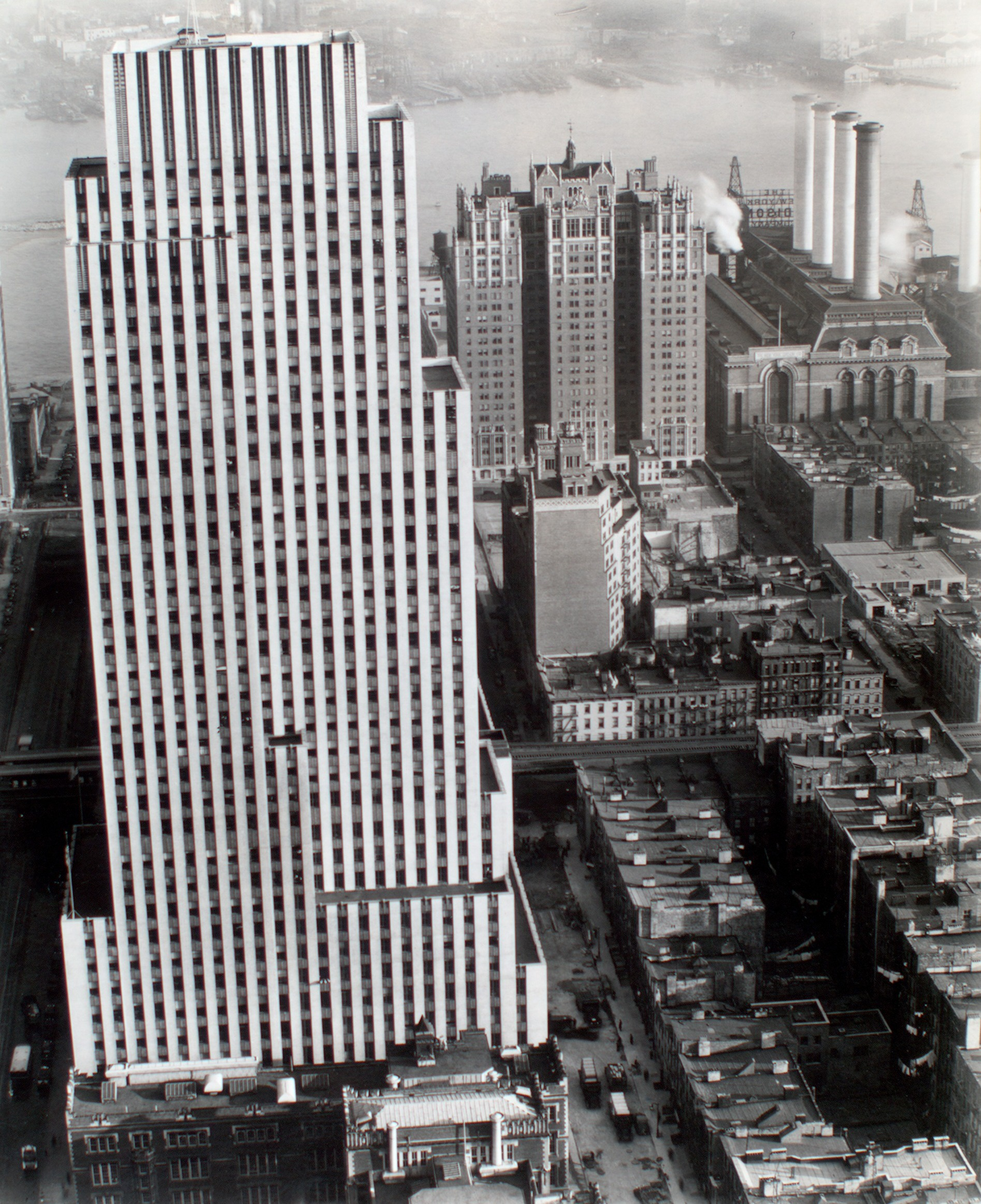
Daily News Building in 1935

While traveling back to Idaho to see her family, Callaway left some of her articles with the editor of the Chicago Tribune, and in 1926, moved to New York to take a position with the Tribune's affiliated paper, the New York Daily News. She started as an assistant editor for the Sunday section, receiving $75 a week (equivalent to $1,332 in 2024). After two years, in May 1928, she was asked to become the society editor. Callaway was distressed, as she shared the industry's general disdain for the society pages, but with the encouragement of her editor, she accepted the position on a trial basis. In September 1929, she married Addison Robb, a public relations executive.

Robb was the paper's society editor between 1928 and 1938 under the byline of Nancy Randolph, which was the Daily News's pen name for the syndicated society column. Her stories often appeared on the paper's front page. Her writing was described as "fearless, witty and bright". In this role, she wrote about wide-ranging topics, including the wedding of Edward VIII, the coronation of King George VI, the opening of the Paris Exposition, the America's Cup races and the Golden Gloves tournament. A profile in Time noted that when the broker Richard Whitney crashed the market, Robb went to the Colony to see what people were saying about it.

=== International News Service (1938–1953) ===
In 1938, Robb was offered her own syndicated column titled "Assignment America" with the International News Service (INS), writing seven articles for $500 a week (equivalent to $11,169 in 2024). The column was described by the INS as "keen, sophisticated feature stories on current events and people in the news". She wrote about news, including reporting on Hitler's plans for chemical warfare, and society events. In 1939, she was invited to fly on Pan American's first transatlantic round-trip flight.

Robb did not consider herself a feminist, believing that female editors should not try to act like men in their jobs but to provide their own skills and viewpoints as women. She often wrote about femininity and tried to expand the conception of roles to include women. In 1939, she spoke at the annual convention of the American Society of Newspaper Editors, urging her colleagues to write news columns and editorials to appeal to both men and women, as she believed the women's pages and finance section were aimed at women and men respectively. Following her talk, the association president William Allen White described her and two other female reporters as "three lovely little hell-cats". She also publicly opposed the Equal Rights Amendment, fearing that it would undo any legal protections for women, and often wrote that "she was an advocate for equal rights for men". She believed that women should not expect men to treat them as equals and that women could have careers, but they should always prioritize their husbands and homes.

==== War correspondent ====
In May 1941, Robb wrote a series of articles about the impact of women on the country's national defense program. Although she was already covering World War II, she insisted that the INS send her to cover the war in person. She was successful, and the news service sent her to England immediately prior to the Pearl Harbor attack. For the next two years, she traveled throughout the United States, England and Ireland, including arriving in Ireland with the first group of American troops in 1942. Her news reports about British women's war efforts were cited by representative Edith Nourse Rogers during a Congressional debate over legislation relating to the Women's Auxiliary Army Corps (WAAC).

On October 17, 1942, Robb became an accredited war correspondent, known as assimilated second lieutenants, for the WAAC. At the time, there were about 600 official war correspondents, with Robb as number 327. She and Ruth Cowan Nash, a journalist with the Associated Press (AP), arrived in Tunisia in January 1943 to spend three months with the WAAC covering the North African campaign. On their arrival, not all of the military officials had been informed, including Army chief of staff Robert A. McClure. The two women faced a number of men who believed that women should not be war reporters, including the AP bureau chief Wes Gallagher. Robb was frustrated by the restrictions on her reporting, protesting in a letter to General Dwight D. Eisenhower that she had been told she could only write about women despite being an accredited correspondent.

In her first series of seven articles, titled "Woman War Correspondent", Robb wrote about the reality of life as a war correspondent, comparing it to fictional depictions, with a particular focus on her experiences as a woman. She wrote about the more harrowing aspects of war with levity, describing being unable to drink during air raids and the items she carried in case of injury. Robb and Nash visited the front to observe American forces retreat from an invasion by German soldiers, led by Erwin Rommel, and spent time with an evacuation hospital. Their writing was praised for its descriptions and compared to that of the war correspondent Ernie Pyle. In January 1946, Robb was one of the 314 correspondents to be honored with theater campaign ribbons for their service by the U.S. War Department.

==== Post-war reporting ====
After Robb returned to the United States in April 1943, she wrote favorably about the WAAC and the proposal to include women in the draft in her column. Her first major story following the end of the war was a round-the-world flight in 1945, which was completed in six days. The Air Transport Command had organized the trip to herald the return of tourism and invited journalists from the AP, the United Press International and the INS. She also covered the founding of the United Nations in San Francisco, California, in 1945.

She traveled frequently, reporting from 40 countries and most of the states. In 1946, she spent time in Germany, Argentina and Chile, where she interviewed Juan Perón and two Chilean presidents. While reporting on the 1947 Texas City disaster, where a chemical ship had blown up in the port, a nearby ship exploded, which knocked Robb over and killed one of her companions. The same day, she filed two stories about the incident; this commitment to the profession was often noted following the event. The same year, she covered the wedding of Princess Elizabeth and Philip Mountbatten, as one of the few reporters allowed at the event, and her report led to her winning the 1947 George R. Holmes memorial award, given to a distinguished INS reporter. She was the first female correspondent to be honored with the prize. Robb subsequently covered the 1953 coronation. In 1950, she reported on the trial of Hermann Sander and the following year, the trial of Julius and Ethel Rosenberg.

=== United Feature Syndicate (1953–1969) ===
In November 1953, Robb left her job with the INS to write a syndicated column for Scripps-Howard and United Feature Syndicate (UFS). In this role, she began to write more opinion columns. Although she reported on the FBI's role in the murder of a black civil rights activist and issues such as taxation and the economy, she often covered topics such as her husband's support for the Brooklyn Dodgers and women wearing pants in the workplace. Robb continued to cover international stories, including the Hungarian Revolution of 1956 and the Brussels World Fair. She was sued for libel by Confidential magazine, along with the UFS, the New York World-Telegram and Sun, for a column that she wrote in 1955 supporting Doris Duke's libel case against the magazine. In 1958, she was elected third vice president of the Overseas Press Club. Her column was carried by 140 newspapers and some of her opinion pieces were compiled into a book titled Don't Just Stand There, which was published by David McKay Co. in 1962.

== Later life ==
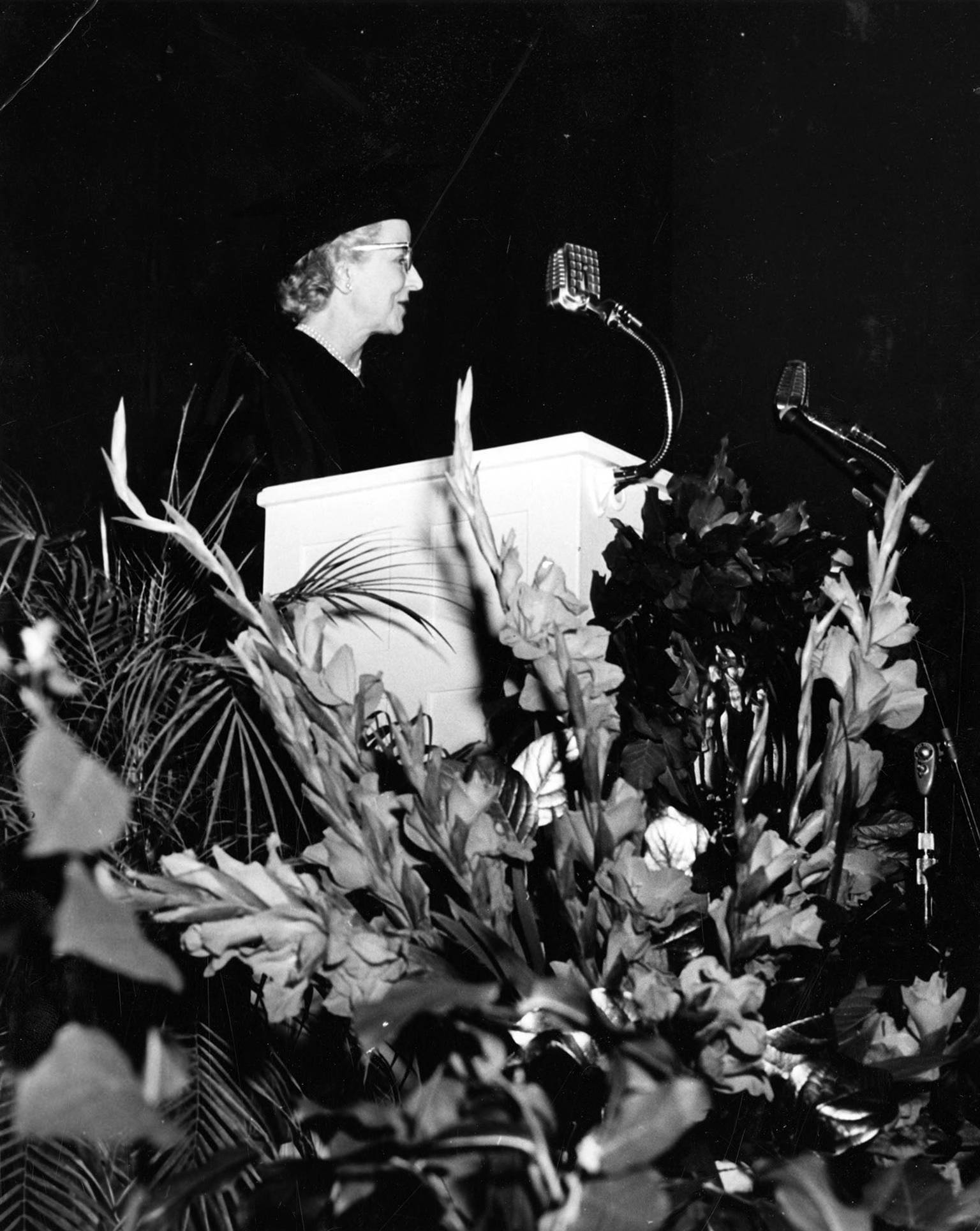
Robb speaking at the University of Idaho commencement in 1959

Outside her column, Robb began writing features for magazines including Cosmopolitan, Vogue, Saturday Review and The Saturday Evening Post by the 1950s. She frequently appeared at national conventions, television and radio shows. While on Meet the Press, she interviewed guests such as senator Joseph McCarthy, attorney general Newbold Morris and the pollster George Gallup. Robb announced her retirement in early 1969. Her husband died of a heart attack in March 1979.

== Death and legacy ==
Robb died of complications from Parkinson's disease on April 4, 1979, in Tucson, Arizona, at the age of 78.

The academic Carolyn Edy has written that Robb is largely forgotten in the modern day, although she was a household name in the 1950s and was considered one of the top newspaperwomen in the world. She wrote more than 10,000 articles during her career, including a syndicated column five days a week which was carried nationwide in about 150 newspapers. She was one of the highest paid female reporters by 1938. She received honors during her career from the New York Newspaper Women's Club and Theta Sigma Phi.

== Works ==
- Robb, Inez (1962). Don't Just Stand There!. New York: David McKay Company. LCCN 62-14179.
