= Betty Wason =

American writer and broadcast journalist

- Born: 6 March 1912; Delphi, Indiana
- Died: February 13, 2001 (aged 88)
- Education: Purdue University
- Occupations: Writer and broadcaster

Elizabeth Wason (March 6, 1912 – February 13, 2001) was an American writer and broadcast journalist; a pioneer, with such others as Mary Marvin Breckinridge and Sigrid Schultz, of female journalism in the United States. She worked for and with Edward R. Murrow during World War II, although despite her significant contributions she, along with a handful of other journalists closely associated with Murrow, were rarely recognized in the famed group of war correspondents known as the Murrow Boys. She also wrote numerous books on food and cooking from the 1940s through 1981.

== Early life ==
Elizabeth "Betty" Wason was born in Delphi, Indiana, to judge James Paddock Wason of Toledo, who was appointed to the 39th Indiana Circuit Court in 1906, and Susan Una Edson Wason, who was born in Navesink, New Jersey. Wason grew up in Delphi, where she studied classical violin and painting. She eventually enrolled in Purdue University hoping to become a dress designer.

Wason graduated from Purdue in 1933 with the Great Depression in full swing. Work was not easy to come by and she settled on a job selling yard goods in the basement of Ayres Department Store in Indianapolis. Her first broadcasting experience came doing a program for a radio cooking school in Lexington, Kentucky. "I was young and wanted to see the world. I had no money, so I decided I would become a journalist," she said in a 1997 interview.

== Foreign correspondent ==
=== Transradio Press Service ===
Wason went around New York City telling any editor that would listen that she was going to Europe and wanted to be their correspondent. When she reached Transradio Press Service, a new wire service, the company president Herbert Moore asked her where she expected to go. Her reply: "Wherever things are happening."

In 1938, Wason found herself in Prague, Czechoslovakia, working for Transradio. She was there when the Nazis took over. She accompanied Hungarian troops as they entered the country and then traveled to Rome for Neville Chamberlain's meetings with Benito Mussolini.

The pay at Transradio, however, was not enough, and she had to return to New York, discouraged.

=== CBS News ===
After a stint doing promotional recipes for Welch's Grape Juice she soon returned to Europe as a regular stringer for CBS's nascent news division, checking in with their Berlin correspondent William L. Shirer, who relied heavily on her work as a stringer as time went on.

Soon after, Wason was on her way to Norway after the Nazi invasion began. Her cross into Norway was anything but routine. She eluded border guards and hitched a ride in a truck across the mountainous terrain where she hid in the woods to wait out an air raid. She interviewed numerous wounded British soldiers and found out just how poorly the Allied defense had gone. She returned to Stockholm and her broadcast by hitching rides and walking.

Wason was regarded as an excellent writer and reporter. However, her contributions went largely unappreciated by CBS management in New York. In April 1940 she gave a live report about women spies in Norway. The immediate response from CBS was criticism of her voice, with management saying that it was "too young and feminine" for war news. She felt betrayed when they insisted that she find a man to read her reports on air, particularly after the man she found, Winston Burdett, ended up with a contract and long career with CBS.

Despite the setbacks, she left Sweden in the spring of 1940 in search of the next big story, and she soon ended up in Greece after short stops in the Balkans and Istanbul. With an expected Italian invasion of Greece on the horizon, CBS again hired Wason. She also started stringing for Newsweek and the newspaper PM during this time.

In October 1940, when Italian forces began to move into Greece, a cable came from CBS: "Find male American broadcast 4U." Though CBS still saw her gender as an impediment, Wason strove on. During her six months in Greece, her voice on the radio, Phil Brown, a secretary at the American embassy, introduced each broadcast with, "This is Phil Brown in Athens, speaking for Betty Wason."

Wason remained in Athens through the winter of 1940 and refused to leave the next spring, April 1941. She was listed as Athens Correspondent for CBS in the 1941 as German air attacks ramped up in Greece's capital. When the Nazis took Athens, Wason was stuck in the city for several weeks. Though America still remained "neutral" in the war, Wason and several other reporters were held by the Germans, who refused to allow anyone to broadcast. Eventually, Wason left Athens on a Deutsche Lufthansa plane bound for Vienna. Also on the plane were Wes Gallagher of the Associated Press and George Weller of the Chicago Daily News. Once in Vienna, the Gestapo detained the entire group under suspected espionage. Soon the male reporters were released, but Wason was kept another week for, according to her, "reasons never divulged except that the police wanted to know more about me." When a CBS executive intervened, the Gestapo released her.

She had married a Mr. Hall by 1943. On her return to the United States, Wason was inundated with interview requests, lecture requests and press attention. She recalled, "Everyone made a fuss over me but CBS," Wason wrote. "When I went to see [news director] Paul White, he dismissed me with, 'You were never one of our regular news staff.' Then what, I wondered, had I been doing for CBS all that time in Greece?"

=== After CBS ===
Wason turned her wartime work as a correspondent into a long career in broadcasting and writing. After leaving CBS, she worked as women's editor at Voice of America, and as an editor at McCalls and, Woman's Home Companion. Wason also spent six years moderating Author Rap Sessions on NBC Radio.

She lived in Washington, D.C., New York, and Portugal while working in public relations and as a freelance writer. In 1985, to be nearer to her family, she moved to Seattle, where she died in 2001.

== Publications ==
Wason authored 24 books after leaving CBS, mostly about one of her longtime favorite hobbies, cooking, though her most successful book was her 1942 story of the Axis invasion of Greece, Miracle in Hellas: The Greeks Fight On. She wrote that the book "was a resounding success. But the tough struggle to make it as a woman correspondent, ending with the cruel rebuff by CBS, cooled my desire for more overseas war reporting."

In 1998, at age 86, Wason wrote about macular degeneration, an affliction which stole most of her eyesight and rendered her legally blind. Macular Degeneration: Living Positively with Vision Loss was written, in part, with a grant from the Washington State Department of Services for the Blind.

- Cooking Without Cans (1943)
- Dinners That Wait (1954)
- Cooks, Gluttons & Gourmets: A history of cookery (1962)
- The Art of Spanish Cooking (1963)
- Bride in the Kitchen (1964)
- The Art of Vegetarian Cookery (1965)
- A Salute to Chinese (1966)
- The Art of German Cooking (1967)
- Salute to Cheese (1968)
- Cooking to Please Finicky Kids (1968)
- It Takes "Jack" to Build a House (1968)
- The Language of Cookery (1968)
- Betty Wason's Greek Cookbook (1969)
- The Everything Cookbook (1970) Hawthorn Books, Inc.
- Mediterranean Cookbook (1973) Henry Regnery Company
- Improving Your Home for Pleasure and Profit (1975)
- Giving a Cheese and Wine Tasting Party (1975)
- Ellen: A Mother's Story of Her Runaway Daughter (1976)
- Soup-to-Dessert High Fiber Cookbook (1981)
