= A. Peter Dewey =

United States Army officer and journalist

- Born: October 8, 1916; Chicago, Illinois, U.S.
- Died: September 26, 1945 (aged 28); Saigon, Vietnam
- Military career
- Branch: Polish Military Ambulance Corps; U.S.Air Transport Command, in Africa; U.S.Office of Strategic Services (OSS)
- Service years: Polish Army, 1940; United States Army, 1942–1945
- Rank: Lieutenant Colonel
- Unit: Office of Strategic Services
- Conflicts: World War II; Battle of France (with the Polish Army); Operation Dragoon; Vietnam Conflict
- Awards: Silver Star; Legion of Merit; Croix de Guerre avec Palmes; Chevalier de la Légion d'honneur Croix du Combattant; Order of Polonia Restituta; Tunisian Order of Glory

Albert Peter Dewey (October 8, 1916 – September 26, 1945) was an American Office of Strategic Services operative shot to death in a case of mistaken identity by Communist aligned Viet Minh troops on September 26, 1945. Dewey was the first American fatality in French Indochina, killed during the 1945 Vietnamese uprising.

== Early life and education ==
The younger son of Congressman Charles S. Dewey and his wife, Marie Suzette de Marigny Hall Dewey, and also a distant relative of New York Governor Thomas E. Dewey, Dewey was born in Chicago. He was educated in Switzerland at Institut Le Rosey, before attending at St. Paul's School (Concord, New Hampshire). He graduated from Yale University, where he studied French history and was a member of the Berzelius Secret Society along with friends such as William Warren Scranton. Later, Dewey also attended the University of Virginia School of Law.

== Newspaper work ==
After his graduation from Yale in 1939, Dewey worked as a journalist for the Chicago Daily News in its Paris bureau.

Dewey later worked for family friend Nelson Rockefeller and his Office of the Coordinator of Inter-American Affairs. Rockefeller once sent him to France to meet secretly with General Charles de Gaulle.

== Battle of France ==
While reporting on the German invasion of France for the Daily News, Dewey became more directly involved in the war.

In May 1940, during the Battle of France, Dewey enlisted as a lieutenant in the Polish Military Ambulance Corps with the Polish Army fighting in France. Following the defeat of the French army, Dewey escaped through Spain to Portugal, where he was interned for a short time.

== Marriage and family ==
On August 1, 1942, Dewey married Nancy Weller. The couple had one child, a daughter, Mrs. Nancy (Charles) Hoppin. Dewey's widow, Nancy, married John Pierrepont in 1950.

Dewey's nephew David Dewey Alger, a descendant of Michigan political scion Russell A. Alger, was killed in the 9/11 attacks on the World Trade Center.

== Office of Strategic Services ==
On August 10, 1944, Dewey parachuted into southern France as the leader of a 10-man team from the United States Office of Strategic Services (OSS). Operating behind enemy lines for six weeks, he transmitted intelligence reports on German troop movements. For his service, General William "Wild Bill" Donovan personally awarded him the Legion of Merit and the French gave him the Legion of Honor and a second Croix de Guerre.

Dewey arrived on September 4, 1945, in Saigon to head a seven-man OSS team "to represent American interests" and collect intelligence. Working with the Viet Minh, he arranged the repatriation of 4,549 Allied POWs, including 240 Americans, from two Japanese camps near Saigon, code named Project Embankment. Because the British occupation forces who had arrived to accept the Japanese surrender were short of troops, they armed French POWs on September 22 to protect the city from a potential Viet Minh attack. In taking control of the city, the French soldiers were quick to beat or shoot Vietnamese who resisted the reestablishment of French authority.

Dewey complained about the abuse to the British commander, General Douglas Gracey, who took exception to Dewey's objections and declared Dewey persona non grata. Adhering to strict tradition, Gracey prohibited anyone but general officers from flying flags from their vehicles. Dewey had wanted to fly an American flag for easy identification among the Viet Minh, who Dewey claimed were only concerned about attacking the French. The jeep he rode in prior to his death had a flag wrapped around a pole that was unidentifiable.

On the night of September 24–25, Capt. Joseph R. Coolidge IV, part of the OSS team in Saigon, became the first post-World War II U.S. casualty in Vietnam when he was shot and critically wounded in a Viet Minh ambush in Thủ Đức, outside of Saigon. He was rescued by the Japanese, treated at a British field hospital and airlifted out of Vietnam to Ceylon by the USAAF.

On September 26 because the airplane scheduled to fly Dewey out did not arrive on time at Tan Son Nhat International Airport, he returned for a lunch meeting with war correspondents Bill Downs and Jim McGlincy at the villa that OSS had requisitioned in Saigon. As he neared the villa, he was shot in the head in an ambush by Viet Minh troops. Dewey's jeep overturned, and Dewey's subordinate, Captain Herbert Bluechel, escaped without serious injury, pursued by Viet Minh soldiers.

The Viet Minh afterward claimed that their troops mistook him for a Frenchman after he had spoken to them in French. Bluechel later recalled that Dewey had shaken his fist and yelled at three Vietnamese soldiers in French while driving back to headquarters. According to Vietnamese historian Trần Văn Giàu, Dewey's body was dumped in a nearby river and was never recovered. Another version is that his body was first hidden in a well and then reburied in nearby village of An Phu Dong. Reportedly, Ho Chi Minh sent a letter of condolence about Dewey's death to U.S. President Harry S. Truman while also ordering a search for the colonel's body. His body was never recovered.

A. Peter Dewey was noted for his prediction over the future of the First Indochina War and the Vietnam War: "Cochinchina is burning, the French and the British are being destroyed there and we are forced to get out of Southeast Asia" due to recent conflict between France and the Viet Minh.

== Memorials ==
Dewey is not listed on the Vietnam Veterans Memorial in Washington, D.C. because the United States Department of Defense has ruled that the war officially started, from a U.S. perspective, on November 1, 1955, after the U.S. took over following the French defeat at Dien Bien Phu.

Dewey's name is listed on the American Battle Monuments Commission's Tablets of the Missing at Manila American Cemetery and Memorial as "Major Albert P. Dewey." His name is also listed as a cenotaph on his parents' grave at Arlington National Cemetery.

Dewey is also remembered in an inscription on one of the walls in the National Cathedral, Washington, DC, which states that he was killed in action Indo-China 1945.

Dewey is also commemorated in a side chapel in Bayeux Cathedral.

After his death, Dewey's non-fiction book, As They Were, about life in Paris before the war, was published with the help of his widow Nancy and the Rockefeller family.

Also, 2005's Fatal Crossroads: A Novel of Vietnam 1945 is based on Dewey's time and death in Vietnam and written by journalist and Dewey family friend Seymour Topping. Topping dedicated the book to Dewey and his O.S.S. colleagues. He also had returned to visit Vietnam with Dewey's daughter Nancy and her husband.
