= Ruth Cowan Nash =

American journalist

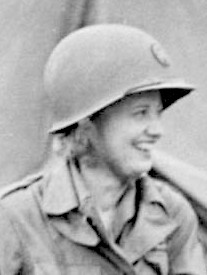
- Ruth Cowan Nash
- Born: June 15, 1901; Salt Lake City, Utah, US
- Died: February 5, 1993 (aged 91); Harper's Ferry, West Virginia, US
- Other name: R. Baldwin Cowan (penname)
- Education: University of Texas at Austin
- Occupations: War correspondent Journalist
- Years active: 1924–1956
- Employer: Associated Press
- Spouse: Bradley De Lamater Nash

Ruth Cowan Nash (June 15, 1901 – February 5, 1993) was an American woman war correspondent. She is famous for her coverage of World War II, during which she followed the Women's Auxiliary Army Corps and reported on major battles for the Associated Press.

== Early life ==
Ruth Cowan Nash was born in Salt Lake City, Utah on June 15, 1901, the only child of parents William Henry and Ida (Baldwin) Cowan. Her father was a mining prospector who died in 1911, at which point Cowan's mother, Ida, bought a homestead in Florida. They were required by the government to live on the property in order to retain their homestead status, and they lived there for about two years trying to raise grapefruit and orange trees. At the end of that time, Nash and her mother returned to Salt Lake City, where Nash attended St. Mary's Academy, a convent school, despite the fact that Nash's family was not Catholic. Ida Cowan had previously been a teacher, and felt that private schools provided a better education, so Nash completed seventh and eighth grade there.

Ida Cowan disliked the cold weather in Salt Lake City, and used the money that she saved from the sale of their homestead to move to San Antonio, Texas. Ida began traveling to find a job, but Nash requested to stay put. Her mother agreed, and found boarding her for at Ursuline Academy, a boarding school. Nash never again returned to living with her mother. Instead, she supported herself with odd jobs while living in San Antonio and attending two other schools, St. Michael's Academy and Main Avenue High School. She worked as a clerk, a librarian, and in the book section of a department store while in high school. When she enrolled in the Main Avenue High School, they found her to be an advanced student and allowed her to graduate high school in two years. During her time there, however, Nash met Elva Cunningham, the president of the San Antonio Parent Teacher Association. Because Nash's mother never lived anywhere consistently, Cunnginham invited Nash to live with the Cunningham family, which consisted of Elva and her husband, John, their sons, and Elva's sister, Mary Carter.

Nash enrolled in the University of Texas at Austin in 1919, and moved out of the Cunningham home in order to do so, but they remained like a second family to her. While there, Newman lived in a Catholic dormitory, Newman Hall. While there, she continued to work odd jobs to support herself. It was during this time that she gave herself the middle name Barbara, but she changed it to Baldwin, her mother's maiden name, shortly thereafter to please her. When Nash graduated in 1923, she became an algebra teacher at Main Avenue High School, the same high school that she had attended herself. While teaching, she lived with the Cunninghams once again.

== Journalism career ==
Nash's journalism career began in 1924, when she began writing part-time as a movie reviewer for the San Antonio Evening News. She got the job through Mary Carter, sister of Elva Cunningham, who knew the managing editor of the paper and worked in the news room. In 1926 they hired her for a full-time position at the Evening News. Nash recalled in an oral history interview that she particularly liked getting "night assignments... because they didn't think I should have them." She also started offering her services as a free-lance journalist, and wrote for other papers, such as the Houston Chronicle, under the name Baldwin Cowan in order to disguise her gender. While working doing work for the Houston Chronicle, Nash met Oveta Culp Hobby and they became fast friends. She continued to work at the San Antonio Evening News until 1929, during which time she covered the 1928 Democratic National Convention in Houston, Texas. While there, she interviewed Franklin D. Roosevelt.

Impressed with her work there, which she had written under her pen name of Baldwin Cowan, United Press offered her a job in January 1929, which she accepted. Not long after, an executive from United Press came to the newsroom looking to praise the work of Baldwin Cowan — when it became clear that there was no such man, only Ruth Cowan Nash, she was fired.

Meanwhile, Kent Cooper at the Associated Press had begun the practice of hiring women during his tenure as general manager beginning in 1925. Upon being fired from United Press for her sex, Nash wrote a letter to Cooper that began: "Dear Mr. Cooper. First, I am a girl. Sight unseen I pass for a man. But notwithstanding my femininity, I need a job, want one with the AP, and can hold it." Cooper promptly hired Nash, and she would go on to work for the Associated Press for the next 27 years as a reporter, writing about many important historical events, although she was often pressured by her superiors to cover the news from the "woman's angle."

She was initially assigned to Chicago, Illinois where she covered Al Capone's trial. While covering the case, she recalled having a "feature instinct," a result of Mr. Capone limping down the courtroom aisle. Nash asked, "New shoes. They hurt, don't they?" to which Mr. Capone responded, "Yes," which Nash used as the hook for her report. She was later assigned to Washington D.C., where she covered social life, human interest stories, and Eleanor Roosevelt's press conferences. Nash would eventually become friendly with the then-First Lady, and correspond with each other often. While in Washington, Nash spent May 1942 covering the introduction and eventual passage of the bill that established the Women's Army Auxiliary Corps, later the Women's Army Corps (WACs).

== World War II journalism ==
After covering the establishment of WACs, Nash requested to follow their first contingent overseas. Her request was approved by her long-time friend, Oveta Culp Hobby, who was then the director of the WACs. Shortly after, AP also approved her request, and Nash left for North Africa, where she would report on WACs, hospitals, and military operations. She was accompanied by one other woman reporter, Inez Robb from the International News Service. Together they were the first women to ever be accredited as United States Army War Correspondents. It is possible that Robb and Nash were utilized as tools to recruit more women for WACs, or garner more support for the war from American women. While reporting, Nash was required to wear the same uniform as the WAC women, and was required to adhere to all the regulations of a member of the Armed Forces.

While deployed in Algeria, beginning January 1943, Nash was met with considerable resistance both from within the U.S. Army and her coworkers at the Associated Press. She suspected that Wes Gallagher, manager of the AP office in North Africa who would go on to become president and General Manager of AP, was hostile to her work, even going so far as to put her in a position that he knew would be bombed. However, not all were hostile to her work. Shortly after her arrival in Algeria, Nash met General George Patton. He reportedly asked her what the first rule of war was, to which Nash responded: "You kill him before he kills you." Patton afterwards stated, "She stays."

In May 1943 Nash was assigned to England, where she covered the arrival of WACs there and the preparations for the European invasion. Then, in September 1944, Nash moved to France and was present for the liberation of Paris. She also covered the Battle of the Bulge. Nash covered the war without a break from 1943 to 1945, mixing hair dye in her helmet to keep her blonde hair neat. Many of her stories were about women and the war effort, but she also wrote about wounded soldiers, new medical treatments, and the effects of war on civilians.

== Return to America and retirement ==
In April 1945, Nash was reassigned to AP's Washington Bureau, and after the war she covered the Pentagon, the House Armed Services Committee, and general military news until 1956. In 1956, she was forced to retire from AP, whose policy stated that women could not work after their 55th birthday. The compulsory retirement age for men at that time was 65.

Early into her forced retirement, Nash married Bradley De Lamater Nash, a Harvard University graduate and expert in government operations who had worked as the Deputy Undersecretary of Commerce. They moved together to Harper's Ferry, West Virginia, where they owned High Acres Farm. Nash used her retirement to continue writing, this time working on her memoir about her experiences during the war. Her manuscript, titled Why Go to War?, was rejected by the publishing company she sent it to in 1946 due to the market's over-saturation with war books.

Ruth Nash was also an active member of the Republican Party, and from May 1957 to August 1958 she served as a public relations consultant for the Republican National Committee's women's division.

Beginning in September 1958, Nash served as the confidential administrative assistant to Bertha Adkins, the Under Secretary of the United States Department of Health, Education, and Welfare (now the Department of Health and Human Services). Also in 1958, Nash became a member of the Defense Advisory Committee on Women in the Services (DACOWITS).

Both Nash and her husband Bradley Nash were active in their retirement, and Bradley Nash was the mayor of Harper's Ferry, West Virginia for many years. They donated portions of their land to the National Park Service in 1984 to create a wildlife preserve.

== Death and legacy ==
Ruth Cowan Nash died on February 5, 1993, of respiratory arrest in her sleep. She was 91 years old. She had no children. Her papers are currently held at Schlesinger Library at Harvard University, in Cambridge, Massachusetts.
