= Sidney A. Olson =

American journalist, advertising executive and author

Sidney A. Olson (April 30, 1908 – January 9, 1995) was an American journalist, advertising executive and writer. During World War II, he served as a war correspondent for TIME Inc., covering the German front from December 1944 to May 1945. He was a Senior Editor for TIME, LIFE, and Fortune; before that, he was a staff writer, White House Correspondent, and ultimately City Editor at The Washington Post. He spent over twenty years in advertising at Kenyon & Eckhardt and J. Walter Thompson. He also published a book about Henry Ford.

== Early life ==
Olson was born and grew up in Salt Lake City, Utah. He attended the University of Utah from 1925 to 1928. Olson was the eldest of three boys—his brothers were Clifford and Stanley—born to Alex P. Olson, an engineer with the Union Pacific Railroad, and Sigrid Gronberg. His cousin Franklin S. Forsberg, also from Salt Lake City, was a founder of the Army's Yank magazine during World War II; Forsberg also served as the U.S. Ambassador to Sweden from 1981 to 1985.

== Career ==
Between 1928 and 1934, Olson was employed by Stevens & Wallis, a printing & advertising company in Salt Lake City. During this period, he also began writing the news for KSL radio, along with book reviews and news articles for the Deseret News. He began working for The Washington Post in 1934, was the editor of their Weekly News Review by 1935, and was appointed City Editor in 1938. He joined TIME Magazine in 1939 as a Contributing Editor, eventually becoming a Senior Editor at TIME, LIFE, and Fortune magazines until he left in 1950. He worked in advertising--Kenyon & Eckhardt, then J. Walter Thompson--from 1951-1973.

== World War II correspondent ==
During World War II, between December 1944 and June 1945, Olson served as a SHAEF-accredited (Supreme Headquarters Allied Expeditionary Force) war correspondent, sending dispatches from the front to TIME and LIFE editors. He crossed the Roer River with General William Hood Simpson's Ninth Army, interviewed General George S. Patton, and covered the collapse of Nuremberg and Cologne. On April 29, 1945, he was one of the first people to enter the Dachau concentration camp as it was being liberated. He toured the camp with General Henning Linden, then typed up an eighteen-page dispatch in the early morning hours of April 30. After taking notes in Munich, Olson traveled on to Innsbruck, Austria. He drove to Paris, arriving in time for V-E Day. He returned to the United States in June 1945.

Olson's WWII dispatches, along with his personal papers up to 1950, are held by the Beinecke Rare Book & Manuscript Library at Yale University, in New Haven, CT.

On November 26, 1945, he was the recipient—along with many other World War II correspondents—of the European-African-Middle Eastern campaign ribbon for "outstanding and conspicuous service with the armed forces under difficult and hazardous combat conditions," awarded by Headquarters, U.S. Forces, European Theater. A year later, he received a certificate from the U.S. Secretary of War: "The War Department expresses its appreciation for patriotic service to: Sydney [sic] A. Olson: for outstanding and conspicuous service as an accredited war correspondent serving with our armed forces in an overseas theater of combat. Nov. 23, 1946."

On November 2, 1948, Olson with John Cameron Swayze and Ben Grauer, co-anchored the first-ever live televised broadcast of the 1948 Presidential race between President Harry S. Truman and Republican candidate New York Governor Thomas E. Dewey. It was filmed by LIFE-NBC at campaign headquarters in New York City. A copy of Dewey's telegram to President Truman, in which he officially conceded the election, was read aloud. Olson can be seen on screen beginning at the 8 min., 49 sec. mark: https://www.youtube.com/watch?v=WsHwnGoZHy0&feature=youtu.be

== Hollywood, public relations and advertising ==
Post-war, Olson wrote less for TIME magazine, concentrating on longer pieces for Fortune and LIFE. In 1947, he published three major stories about Hollywood, one about Bing Crosby, another about Paramount Pictures, and the third about House UnAmerican Committee (HUAC) hearings—led by Joseph McCarthy—of the Hollywood Ten (suspected Communists in the movie industry).

In March 1950, Olson headed to Hollywood to pursue an opportunity offered him by Henry Ginsberg, vice-president of Paramount Pictures. Olson was given a six-month contract to work on screenplays, among them Alice Sit-by-the-Fire, a play written by J. M. Barrie, the author of Peter Pan (in 1951, the screenplay was made into a movie titled Darling, How Could You!). He worked on another screenplay called The Dark Wood (original play by Alice Duer Miller). He received signed contracts for two original movie treatments, The Battle of the Sexes (in Westchester) and The Traitor.

After working in Hollywood, Olson began working on select public relations projects for the Earl Newsom Company, including the Ford Foundation and Ernest R. Breech of the Ford Motor Company.

Between 1950 and 1953, Olson was given access to Henry Ford's archives in Dearborn, Michigan. His book Young Henry Ford: A Picture History of the First Forty Years, completed in 1953, was published in 1963.

Olson enjoyed a second career in advertising, serving first as copy supervisor at Kenyon & Eckhardt from 1951 to 1956, where he made a name for himself with The American Road campaign for Ford Motor Company. While with K&E, Olson wrote Henry Ford II's closing speech for the live televised Ford 50th Anniversary Show (Ford Motor Company), produced by Leland Hayward and broadcast on June 15, 1953 (simulcast on CBS and NBC).

In 1956, Olson joined J. Walter Thompson as Copy group head; he was named Vice President at JWT in 1956 and remained there until 1973, working on major accounts like Eastman Kodak and Ford Mustang. In 1957, he went around the world to identify production locations in Asia and the Middle East for the Ford Motor Company's television campaign, Proved and Approved Around the World.

== Personal life ==
Olson married Zembra Corinne Holmgren (1910–1997), of Bear River, Utah, in Washington, D.C., on January 16, 1937. They raised three children—Whitney (1937-2023), John (1942-2025), and Stephen (1952–1992)—in Larchmont, New York. Olson retired in 1973 and moved with his wife and Stephen to Darien, Connecticut. During the 1980s, Olson was diagnosed with Parkinson's disease. He died on January 8, 1995, in Darien, Connecticut.

== Legacy ==
Olson published over 700 articles with a by-line for the Washington Post, many of them about politics. He covered FDR, the Senate, the Courts, national conventions and committee meetings. He was invited to the White House on numerous occasions, both to cover stories and to attend social events including the 1936 Correspondents Dinner.

The World War II dispatches Olson wrote for TIME and LIFE were noteworthy for their depth of detail, insights about military strategy, and careful observations about human suffering. Olson was one of the first people to enter Dachau concentration camp as it was being liberated on April 29, 1945; his coverage for TIME and LIFE of that day's horrors (TIME, May 8, 1945; LIFE, May 14, 1945) has been cited in numerous books and articles.

In 2024, his WWII letters and dispatches were published in Following the Front: The Dispatches of World War II Correspondent Sidney A. Olson.

Olson created "The American Road" campaign for Ford while at Kenyon & Eckhardt. While at JWT, he was a member of Lee Iacocca's Fairlane Committee, which oversaw the creation of the Ford Mustang.
