= John E. Olson (analyst) =

John Erik Alexander Olson (July 1, 1942 – December 9, 2025) was an American energy industry analyst. He joined Merrill Lynch in 1992, and soon developed an early and unrelenting skepticism of Enron. Due to Enron's position that no investment bank could participate in any of the company's round if their analyst did not support a "buy" to its stock, he was let go in 1999. Enron collapsed two years later and Merry Lynch had to pay a 100 millions dollars as part of a settlement with regulators. Several of its executives were also jailed.
