= John MacVane =

American journalist

- Born: John MacVane; April 29, 1912; Portland, Maine, U.S.
- Died: January 28, 1984 (aged 71); Brunswick, Maine, U.S.
- Occupations: Broadcast journalist; War correspondent

John Franklin MacVane (April 29, 1912 – January 28, 1984) was an American broadcast journalist and war correspondent. He gained prominence covering World War II in Europe for NBC News. Throughout the war he provided eyewitness radio reports on major events, including the London Blitz, the Dieppe Raid, the Allied invasion of Italy, and the Normandy landings at Omaha Beach.

== Early life ==
MacVane was born in Portland, Maine. He received a bachelor's degree from Williams College in 1933 and a master's degree from Oxford University in 1935. Prior to World War II, he worked as a print journalist for the Brooklyn Eagle and the New York Sun. In 1938 he accepted a position as a sub-editor for the London Daily Express.

== Career ==
MacVane began his career as a war correspondent reporting from France for the International News Service. He left the country in June 1940 shortly before its fall. He soon joined the newly-established NBC News division as a broadcast journalist and covered the London Blitz alongside Edward R. Murrow of CBS News.

MacVane continued to work as a war correspondent throughout World War II. He was the only American correspondent to accompany Allied forces during the Dieppe Raid. He also accompanied the invasion fleet during the North African campaign in 1942. In 1944 he covered the Normandy landings, and was the first correspondent to land at Omaha Beach. He returned to London to broadcast the first full eyewitness report of the invasion. He was one of the first correspondents to enter Paris after its liberation. MacVane continued to report from the Western Front until the fall of Berlin, and witnessed the meeting of American and Soviet forces at the Elbe near the end of the war.

In 1946 MacVane convinced NBC to open up a bureau at the United Nations. He left NBC in 1950 to serve as an adviser to the United States mission to the UN. Starting in 1953 he worked as the UN bureau chief for ABC News and remained at the network until his retirement in 1977. In his later career he moderated the television program United or Not? and was a contributor to ABC Evening News.

== Books ==
- Journey Into War: War and Diplomacy in North Africa. London: Robert Hale, Ltd. 1943.
- On the Air in World War II. New York: William Morrow and Company. 1979.
