= Bill Boss =

William Boss (May 3, 1917 – October 17, 2007) was a Canadian war correspondent and reporter for the Canadian Press, commonly known as Bill Boss or "bb" (his wire initials). He was known for his work in World War II and the Korean War, and for his famous ginger beard. Colleagues described him as the toughest war correspondent they have ever known, and Pierre Berton is quoted saying that Bill "was as fiery as his red beard. He ate censors for breakfast."

Boss was born in Kingston, Ontario on May 3, 1917 and died of pneumonia at the age of 90 on October 17, 2007 in Ottawa.

== Education, music and early reporting ==
Boss spoke many languages, including English, French, Italian, German, Dutch and Russian, as well as a little Korean and Japanese. He was also a musician who played the piano and organ, as well as composed music and conducted numerous symphony orchestras in Ottawa, as well as in Italy and the Netherlands later. Boss obtained a philosophy degree at Lisgar Collegiate Institute in Ottawa, where he also founded the Ottawa Concert Orchestra and worked part-time as a journalist for the Ottawa Citizen. In 1937 Boss moved to Toronto, where we worked as a correspondent for the Times of London and in 1938 worked for them in London for several months, after which Boss returned to Ottawa and obtained a bachelor of arts at the University of Ottawa in 1941.

== WWII ==
In 1943 Boss was shipping overseas to Italy with the Canadian Corps as a Public Relations Officer, in charge of escorting journalists to the front lines. In 1944 chief Gil Purcell of the Canadian Press had lieutenant Boss drafted out of the Canadian Corps and hired him as a war correspondent for the Allied advance through Italy and Northwest Europe. In early 1945 Boss left Italy to cover the liberation in the Netherlands. After the war Boss continued to work with the Canadian Press as a foreign correspondent, mostly stationed in London and Amsterdam as well as a brief stint in Edmonton in 1948.

== Korea ==
When the war in Korea broke out in 1950 Boss became the leading Canadian journalist and largely shaped the Canadian perception of the war, as many Canadian newspapers at the time relied heavily on the Canadian Press for their coverage. Boss was sent to Busan, South Korea with the Princess Patricia's Canadian Light Infantry and immediately wanted to diminish his reliance on military authorities so that he could get to the places we wanted to report from, without censorship. Boss acquired copious amounts of Scotch, which he traded for a tent, generator, trailer and Jeep (later known as the "CP Jeep") so that he was able to travel separately from the military. Boss went on to cover every major battle in the Korean War involving Canadian forces, including the Battle of Kapyong, the Battle of Chuam-ni and the Battle of Maehwa-San.

A number of other reporters despised Boss, and even tried to have him removed from Korea, as he refused to censor his content and often wrote about war crimes committed by Canadian troops. A particular incident was that of three Canadian soldiers beating and raping two Korean women, followed by locking them in a house with several South Korean soldiers and attacking the house with grenades and automatic weapons. Boss wrote an article ten days following the incident which was "lost" on its way to Canadian headquarters. It was later revealed in Maclean's magazine that Boss's story had been intercepted by American occupation officials in Tokyo, forwarded to Canadian Army Headquarters and disregarded. However, Boss was known for his persistence in reporting what he saw and refusing censorship, and holds the Korean endurance record for war correspondents.

== After war ==
After the Korean War Boss opened the first Canadian news bureau for Canadian Press for Moscow. In 1958 he retired from the Canadian Press to become the founding director of Public Relations at the University of Ottawa. Bill Boss finally retired in 1982 and traveled the world on ocean freighters in search for a warm refuge from the cold Canadian winters, eventually settling in Sri Lanka.

== Awards ==
- 1951: National Newspaper Award for "Feature Writing/Reportage"
- 1954: National Newspaper Award for "Staff Corresponding"
- 1998: Conducted into the Canadian News Hall of Fame
