= James McGlincy =

American journalist (1917–1988)

- Born: James Francis McGlincy; August 21, 1917
- Died: February 9, 1988 (aged 70); New York, New York
- Occupations: Journalist; War correspondent

James Francis McGlincy (August 21, 1917 – February 9, 1988) was an American journalist. From 1940 to 1949 he worked as a war correspondent for the United Press, covering World War II in Europe and later joining a press corps led by Tex McCrary that toured Asia after the surrender in Europe. In 1945, he was among the first Americans to enter Hiroshima after the atomic bombing.

== World War II and Asia ==
Beginning in 1940, McGlincy reported for the United Press bureau out of London, where he roomed with colleague Walter Cronkite, who he remained friends with for the rest of his life.

In 1945 McGlincy joined a hand-picked group of airborne correspondents organized by Tex McCrary to cover the Twentieth Air Force. The press corps toured Europe in the weeks after V-E Day in a custom B-17 fitted with high-powered shortwave radio equipment. They started with Paris and moved on to examine first-hand the destruction from the Allied bombing campaigns on Hamburg and Dresden Over the following few months the group toured Asia, making stops in China, French Indochina, Thailand, Burma, the Malay States, and Java.

A month after the atomic bombing of Hiroshima, the press corps entered the city against General Douglas MacArthur's orders. McGlincy described the scene:

Driving into Hiroshima we saw a buzzard sitting on a tree. Nobody but a buzzard would want to pick over this city—undoubtedly the most destroyed city per square mile of all those that have been bombed and shelled in six years of bloody war in Europe and the Pacific... One bomb—that is the key to the most staggering single event of this war. You can ride through Hiroshima and look at it again and again and all the time you say to yourself, 'One bomb did all this.'... From that one bomb people are still dying... According to Japanese doctors, their hair falls out, their gums bleed and they have stomach and kidney trouble... They get weaker and weaker and finally they die... In this city you can smell the stench of death as it used to stink from the bodies of dead Germans who were left to bloat in the summer sun in Normandy. In this city you can see all the ruined cities of the world put together and spread out. In this city you can see in the eyes of the few Japanese picking through the ruins all the hate it is possible for a human to muster.

During a stop in Saigon in September 1945, James McGlincy and CBS correspondent Bill Downs were invited for lunch with Colonel A. Peter Dewey at a villa being used as the headquarters for the OSS operation in the region. While they waited, a skirmish broke out between the Viet Minh and the few men stationed at the headquarters. Shooting back as he ran, Major Herbert Bluechel emerged covered in Colonel Dewey's blood. In the confusion, McGlincy and Downs were handed carbines and joined the rest in the firefight. After two and a half hours the attackers withdrew, and McGlincy and Downs volunteered to head for a nearby airport in search of reinforcements. They took a bottle of Old Crow, pretended to be drunks and, on Downs' suggestion, sang as they walked when he posited "I don't think anybody would shoot at a man who's singing." They met three Gurkhas at the airfield and addressed them in pidgin English. The men responded in perfect Oxford accents and promised to go to the headquarters. Upon returning, the two joined the search for Colonel Dewey's body.

== Later career ==
He left the United Press in worked for various publications, including the Daily Express, New-York Mirror, and New York Post. In 1950-51 he was the Chicago bureau manager for Newsweek. He received the George Polk Award for metropolitan reporting for his work in the New York Daily News in 1954. He later worked for CBS News until retiring in 1986.

== Personal life ==
McGlincy was deeply affected by his experiences covering World War II, and he suffered from alcoholism throughout his career. He quit drinking later in life, and was offered a job by Walter Cronkite at CBS News before ultimately retiring in 1986. He died from cancer of the lymph glands on February 9, 1988.
