= South African Press Association =

Defunct news agency of South Africa

- Company type: Cooperative
- Industry: Press
- Founded: 1 July 1938 - closed 31 March 2015
- Headquarters: Johannesburg, Gauteng, South Africa
- Area served: National wide
- Key people: Mark Van der Velden (editor)
- Products: Wire service

The South African Press Association (SAPA) was the national news agency of South Africa from 1938 until its closure on 31 March 2015.

== History ==
The agency was established on 1 July 1938 by major South African newspapers to facilitate the sharing of news. Reuters had dominated the internal supply of news in South Africa until 1938. When SAPA was founded, Reuters retained the exclusive right to supply it with world news. Reuters ended this partnership in 1995, when it began expanding its own Southern African activities in competition with SAPA. In February 1938, the constitution for the new agency was framed, and by April that year, it became a co-operative news agency under the control of every British and Afrikaans newspaper that wished to join.

During the apartheid era, the agency was criticised by the ruling National Party for inadequate reporting of the government's viewpoint and Afrikaner culture.

From 1964 to 1981, SAPA owned a subsidiary in the Inter-Africa News Agency (IANA) in neighbouring Rhodesia (later Zimbabwe), which was later taken over by the Zimbabwe Mass Media Trust.

The non-governmental agency continued to function under the ownership of South African newspapers. SAPA was the major news supplier of foreign and domestic news to South Africa, providing all forms of media – newspapers, television, radio and web-based – with news, videos and photographs. Its newswire provided a constant feed of news to newsrooms in South Africa. The agency also maintained a picture and news video service and press release service called link2media. Traditionally, SAPA relied on its regional newspaper members for regional South African news, in addition to reporting by its own staff.

Its head office was in Johannesburg, and it had bureaus in Cape Town, Durban, Bloemfontein and Pretoria. Its primary area of distribution was in South Africa, although it did have clients abroad as well as exchange agreements with other major news agencies.

== Closure ==
SAPA ceased operations on March 31, 2015, after its assets were liquidated. Its assets comprised one oversized boardroom table which was thrust into staffers' recreation room after the boardroom lease was surrendered during the agency's steady decline. Under the stewardship of Naspers employee Minette Ferreira, who acted as Sapa chairperson at the time, no copies of board minutes chronicling Sapa's demise were released to sacked employees or any media archive for future use by historians. Three companies – Gallo Images, KMM Review Publishers, and Sekunjalo Investments Holdings – expressed an interest in setting up an operation on similar lines as the agency, which is a special category of non-profit that may not be sold. Sekunjalo Investments would go on to launch the African News Agency.

== Notable journalists ==
- Hannes Wet - managing news editor
- Mark van der Velden - editor
- Russel Norton - deputy editor
- Eric Lloyd Williams - Second World War correspondent

== See also ==
- Media of South Africa
- Communications in South Africa
