= Trans-Ocean News Service =

- Founded: 1914

Transocean News Service (also Trans-Ocean News Service) was a wireless German news agency headquartered in Berlin, Germany. It was closed by occupation government after the German capitulation in May 1945.

The agency was founded in 1914 in response to Britain’s cutting of transatlantic cables to Germany during the World War I. In the 1920s and until Adolf Hitler rose to power in 1933, Transocean was a reputable news agency. Then the Nazis put it under control of the Foreign Office and the Propaganda Ministry. Transocean, however, presented itself as an independent news agency and not an official government run institution like the German News Bureau (Deutsches Nachrichtenbüro).

The news agency became active in the United States in August 1938 with the arrival of Manfred Zapp and Günther Tonn, Transocean's U.S. managers from Germany. It maintained an office at 341 Madison Avenue, New York City. In the summer of 1941, before the attack on Pearl Harbor, the United States Government ordered the closure of Transocean and the withdrawal of the German nationals connected with it after a trial in which it was found guilty of having failed to register with the State Department as the agent of a foreign government.

During the German National Socialist period the news agency provided articles to small papers in South America, Asia and some of the 178 German language papers in the United States for free or at a nominal rate. Transocean was largely subsidized by the German government.

Transocean's most famous dispatch was early on June 6, 1944, when its German language broadcast announced the landing of Allied parachute troops on the French coast. This broadcast was picked up by the Associated Press, which put it out on its news wire to its subscribers. This was the first news of the landing code-named Operation Overlord, the Allied invasion of Nazi-occupied Europe.
