= Wes Gallagher =

American journalist

Wes Gallagher (October 5, 1911 – October 11, 1997) was an American journalist for the Associated Press. He worked as a reporter during World War II. He died in Santa Barbara, California.

== College and early career ==
James Wesley Gallagher was born October 5, 1911, to James Gallaher and Crispa (Nelson), in California and stayed there for his some of his post-secondary education. He attended Santa Cruz High School, graduating in 1928, and then enrolled at University of San Francisco. Eventually he departed for the campus of Louisiana State University.

Gallagher was a sports writer at the Register-Pajaronian and then worked at thee Baton Rouge Morning Advocate and State Times. While at the State Times he covered the assassination of Huey P. Long. In 1937, he joined the Associated Press at their Buffalo, N.Y. bureau before becoming an Associated Press reporter in 1937 at its Buffalo, N.Y. bureau and was dispatched to become a war correspondent when World War II began.

== Work during WWII ==
During the war Gallagher covered North Africa and Europe for the AP. In 1940, the AP sent him to Copenhagen just in time to witness the Nazi invasion of Denmark. Reporting on the war he covered the Allied invasion of North Africa in 1942, also served in Greece, the Balkans, and Austria.

In 1946, he covered the Nuremberg trials for the Associated Press, and when the verdicts were announced, Gallagher got his report out first by dashing a long distance to his wife who was waiting with an active phone. Gallagher was recalled to the New York bureau in 1951. He became the AP's general manager and president in 1962, serving until 1976.

== Post-war work ==
In 1945, freshly returned from the combat zones in Europe and Africa, Gallagher was appointed to head AP operations in Germany. He helped oversee the launching of AP's German News Service, based in Frankfurt which was instrumental in helping the German media rebuild after the war. In 1946 Gallagher covered the Nazi war crime trials at Nuremberg. He outscooped his rivals on the verdicts by dashing 100 yards to where his wife, Betty, waited with an open phoneline. He led the Nuremberg coverage for the AP along with Pulitzer Prize winners Dan DeLuce and Louis P. Lochner.

In 1954 he was appointed Assistant General Manager of the AP, a position he retained until Frank J. Starzel retired as General Manager in 1962. The AP board of directors chose Gallagher to take over the post. One of the duties he fulfilled as General Manager was to write the dedication for each of the annuals the AP produced for the years 1964-78, as well as for other AP publications such as The Instant It Happened, a collection of famous journalistic photographs.
