= CBS News 24/7 =

American streaming news channel

- Country: United States
- Broadcast area: Worldwide
- Network: CBS News
- Headquarters: CBS Broadcast Center; Manhattan, New York City, New York, U.S. CBS News Bay Area; San Francisco, California, U.S.

Programming
- Language: English
- Picture format: 1080i (HD); Downscaled to: 540p 360p 144p

Ownership
- Owner: Skydance Corporation
- Parent: CBS News
- Sister channels: List: Nickelodeon; Nick Jr. Channel; Nicktoons; TeenNick; NickMusic; CBS; CBS Sports Network; CBS Sports HQ; CBS Sports Golazo Network; MTV; MTV2; MTV Tres; MTV Live; MTV Classic; BET; BET Gospel; BET Her; BET Hip-Hop; BET Jams; BET Soul; VH1; Comedy Central; TV Land; Logo; CMT; CMT Music; Pop TV; Showtime; The Movie Channel; Flix; Paramount Network; Smithsonian Channel

History
- Launched: November 6, 2014; 12 years ago
- Former names: CBSN (2014–2022); CBS News (2022–2024)

Links
- Webcast: www.cbsnews.com/live

Availability

Streaming media
- The Roku Channel: Channel 117
- Service(s): FuboTV, Google TV, Hulu + Live TV, LG Channels, Paramount+, Pluto TV, Prime Video Live TV, Samsung TV Plus, Sling Freestream, Tigo Star (Only on Central America), The Roku Channel, Vizio Watch Free+, Xumo Play

CBS News 24/7 (formerly known as CBSN and the CBS News Streaming Network) is an American streaming video news channel operated by the CBS News division of Skydance Corporation. Launched on November 6, 2014, it features blocks of live, rolling news coverage, original programs, as well as encore airings of CBS News television programs.

It is available on all streaming devices, via the CBS News website and mobile app, apps on digital media players, co-owned Paramount+ and Pluto TV, and other free ad-supported streaming television (FAST) services.

The success of CBSN prompted CBS to launch similar services for sports and entertainment news—CBS Sports HQ and ET Live—in 2018, in conjunction with CBS Sports and Entertainment Tonight respectively. In December of that year, CBS also began extending the concept to its local television stations, launching streaming local news services in the markets of the network's owned-and-operated stations.

== History ==
Former CBSN logos

Rumors that CBS News was preparing a 24-hour online news service were first reported by BuzzFeed in October 2013, and later confirmed by a CBS spokesperson who stated that the company was seeking "partners" for the service. Initial reports suggested that the service would consist of a linear, multi-platform streaming channel, featuring video content from other CBS News productions, along with other online-exclusive content; The New York Times likened the rumored format to an all-news radio station, combining pre-recorded video content with regular, live news updates. On May 15, 2014, CBS Corporation CEO Leslie Moonves confirmed in an interview with Bloomberg Television that the company was working on the service. Describing it as an "exciting alternative to cable news", he went on to say that "there is so much information that we get every day that doesn’t fit into a 22-minute newscast at 6:30 or CBS This Morning".

In October 2014, Capital New York reported that CBS had recently filed for trademarks on the name CBSN as a potential name for the service. It also reported that the content would take place in an informal newsroom setting, and that its interface would consist of a video player with a playlist on a sidebar, and feature social network integration. On November 5, 2014, during a Re/code conference in Dublin, CBS Interactive President Jim Lanzone announced that the service would officially launch on November 6, 2014. CBS News President David Rhodes explained that CBSN was not designed to compete directly with traditional pay-television news outlets, but to "create something that is native for connected devices", such as smartphones, tablets, and digital media players.

There was also an emphasis placed on targeting younger viewers, particularly those who are in places with little or no access to television, or those who do not subscribe to pay television at all. As opposed to CNNGo, a similarly formatted TV Everywhere service introduced by CNN prior to the launch of CBSN, CBSN would be available at no charge without requiring users to authenticate with a subscription to a pay television provider. Rhodes argued that requiring authentication would hamper the service's viewership. CBSN uses commercial breaks similar to a conventional television channel; Amazon.com and Microsoft were among the service's initial advertisers.

Former logo of the streaming service, same logo as the CBS News unit

In September 2021, CBS announced that CBSN would be rebranded under the CBS News name later in the year; the usage of a single brand for both broadcast and digital news content followed a reorganization that placed all of CBS's news efforts, including at the CBS-owned stations, under the purview of the CBS News division as CBS News and Stations.

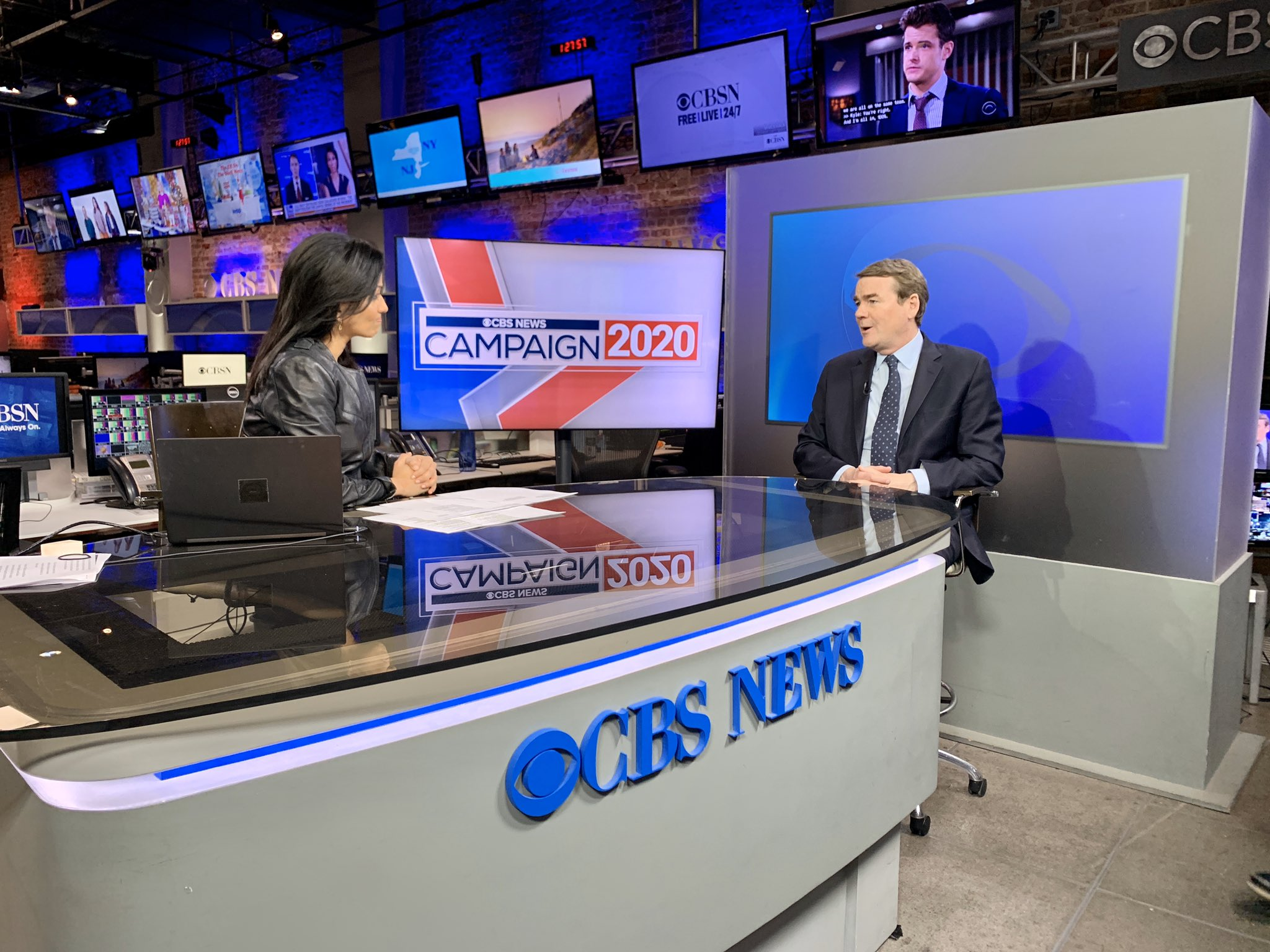
Ninan interviewing Michael Bennet in 2019

The new branding premiered on January 24, 2022. At this time, the service moved to a new set at Studio 57 of the CBS Broadcast Center, which had been vacated by the replacement of CBS This Morning with the Times Square-based CBS Mornings. It was also accompanied by a slate of new original programming, some of which acting as spin-offs or revivals of segments from other CBS News programs. They include the documentary franchise CBS Reports, The Dish (based on the segment from CBS Saturday Morning), Eye on America, Here Comes the Sun (which features segments and unaired material from CBS News Sunday Morning), On The Road with Steve Hartman, and the interview series Person-to-Person with Norah O'Donnell. While the service was primarily branded under the CBS News name, the service was officially referred to by CBS as the "CBS News Streaming Network".

In April 2024, CBS News announced a rebranding of the service as CBS News 24/7 on April 22, which accompanied an expansion of the service's live daily programming.

=== Spinoffs ===
The success of CBSN led CBS to launch CBS Sports HQ, a similar service devoted to sports news, on February 26, 2018. It provides sports news headlines, game previews, highlights and post-game analysis, and in-depth team, player and game statistics—utilizes resources from CBS Sports and its various digital properties.

ET Live, an entertainment and pop culture news service based on the CBS-produced syndicated program Entertainment Tonight, was launched on October 31, 2018. Developed in collaboration between CBS Interactive and ET distributor CBS Television Distribution, the service covers entertainment news headlines and breaking news, celebrity interviews, feature segments, behind-the-scenes and red carpet coverage, and trends in celebrity fashion, beauty and lifestyle. ET Live utilizes complementary standalone presenters complementary to those featured on Entertainment Tonight—some of whom serve as on-air contributors for the syndicated broadcast—with the parent series' main hosts and correspondents appearing in segments promoting stories scheduled to be shown on the on-air broadcast. In July 2022, ET Live was rebranded as Mixible, maintaining a similar scope, but with contributions by other Paramount properties.

== CBS News Local ==
Following the successful launches of CBSN and other streaming services, CBS created local, direct-to-consumer extensions of CBSN run by CBS Local Digital, in order to bring streaming anchored local and national news coverage across all CBS Television Stations on a 24/7 basis. The services stream existing CBSN national coverage—which is also used as an overnight and weekend backup feed for the CBSN Local outlets—in conjunction with live streams of local broadcasts and continuing coverage performed by the owned-and-operated stations. All services are supported by ad revenue. All CBSN Local services are available via Paramount+, CBS News, Pluto and local station websites and apps. The services are available nationally, and are not limited to their respective regions.

Pluto TV—which already carried the main CBSN service—began carrying CBSN New York and CBSN Los Angeles as well as ET Live and CBS Sports HQ on its lineup on November 12, 2019. The carriage came as the free ad-supported streaming television (FAST) service was in the process of becoming a sister property to CBS as part of CBS Corporation's merger with Viacom (which, earlier that year, had acquired Pluto TV from namesake parent Pluto Inc.), which was completed on December 4, 2019. On March 29, 2021, CBS-owned independent station KTXA in the Dallas–Fort Worth market began simulcasting CBSN Dallas-Ft. Worth on its second subchannel (21.2), becoming the first over-the-air simulcast of CBSN programming.

As of September 2025, CBS Local operates streaming services in 15 markets:

Service	Station branding	Launch date	Notes
CBS News New York	CBS New York / New York 55	December 13, 2018	Programming led by WCBS-TV and WLNY-TV.
CBS News Los Angeles	CBS LA / KCAL 9	June 10, 2019	Programming led by KCBS-TV and KCAL-TV.
CBS News Boston	WBZ / TV 38	September 24, 2019	Programming led by WBZ-TV and WSBK-TV.
CBS News NorCal	KPIX / PIX+	November 18, 2019	Programming led by KPIX-TV and KPYX. (Note: While all live Bay Area programming is shown, Sacramento programming is shown (live and/or tape delayed) when there is no current live Bay Area broadcast.)
CBS News Minnesota	WCCO	December 12, 2019	Programming led by WCCO-TV.
CBS News Philadelphia	CBS Philadelphia / Philly 57	January 30, 2020	Programming led by KYW-TV and WPSG.
CBS News Colorado	CBS Colorado	February 19, 2020	Programming led by KCNC-TV. (Note: Originally launched as CBSN Denver.)
CBS News Pittsburgh	KDKA-TV / KDKA+	March 5, 2020	Programming led by KDKA-TV and WPKD-TV.
CBS News Chicago	CBS Chicago	April 21, 2020	Programming led by WBBM-TV.
CBS News Texas	CBS Texas / TXA 21	May 18, 2020	Programming led by KTVT and KTXA. (Note: Originally launched as CBSN Dallas–Ft. Worth.)
CBS News Sacramento	CBS 13 / KMAX 31	June 16, 2021	Programming led by KOVR and KMAX-TV.
CBS News Baltimore	WJZ / CBS Baltimore	August 23, 2021	Programming led by WJZ-TV.
CBS News Miami	CBS Miami / CW Miami 33	January 24, 2022	Programming led by WFOR-TV and WBFS-TV.
CBS News Detroit	CBS Detroit / CW Detroit 50	January 23, 2023	Programming simulcast on WWJ-TV and WKBD-TV.
CBS News Atlanta	CBS Atlanta	TBA	Programming led by WUPA.

By early 2020, CBS had planned to launch CBSN Local services across the remaining markets featuring a news-producing owned-and-operated station that did not yet operate the streaming service.

CBS has not announced any plans to make CBS News Local available in two other markets with a CBS Television Stations property: Tacoma–Seattle (KSTW) and Tampa–St. Petersburg (WTOG), all standalone stations in markets where the CBS affiliates are owned by other companies (those stations being, respectively, Cox Media's KIRO, and Tegna-owned WTSP). In December 2019, it was first reported that CBS was looking to hire journalists for some of the aforementioned stations. The following month, CBS announced it was launching 10 p.m. weeknight newscasts at WKBD, WUPA, and WTOG hubbed out of KTVT, WCBS, and WFOR, respectively, and confirmed the newly hired multimedia journalists would help produce stories. The decision was due in part to the rising demand for newscasts from viewers and advertisers alike, and to the successful rollout of CBSN Local thus far. During the COVID-19 pandemic in the United States, WUPA's 10 p.m. newscast began airing a simulcast of WSBK's 10 p.m. newscast, after CBS suspended all operations at the CBS Broadcast Center in New York City. Five months later, the WSBK simulcast ended and KTVT began producing newscasts for WUPA. In July 2022, the WKBD, WUPA, and WTOG newscasts were replaced by new programs under the Now title, which featured a mixture of local segments, and national segments produced from KTVT; similar programs were concurrently launched on KSTW, WLNY-TV in New York, WSBK-TV in Boston, WPSG in Philadelphia, KTXA in Dallas–Fort Worth, KBCW in San Francisco, and WBFS-TV in Miami. In June 2025, concurrent with CBS's announcement that WUPA would become an CBS owned-and-operated station in August of that year, CBS announced plans to launch a dedicated streaming channel for the Atlanta market named CBS News Atlanta.

The CBSN Local services were rebranded under the CBS News name concurrently with the 2022 rebranding of the national service; their names were not changed when the national service was renamed CBS News 24/7. CBS News and Stations co-president Wendy McMahon stated, in an interview with Variety coinciding with the rebranding, that CBS planned to produce 45,000 hours of local programming for the local streams by the end of 2022, including high school sports coverage. The services' names were incorporated into the titles of the Now newscasts in markets where CBS maintains a full news operation.

== Programming history ==
According to Moonves, CBSN is designed primarily to leverage the resources of CBS News and other CBS-owned entities to "create exciting, highly competitive new services that meet evolving audience preferences for content consumption"; viewers can watch CBSN live as a linear service, or watch previous segments on-demand.

CBSN's programming was impacted by the temporary shutdown of the CBS Broadcast Center in early 2020, during the COVID-19 pandemic. For two weeks in March 2020, CBSN did not produce its regular programming, with CBSN Boston being simulcast on the national service for much of the day. During this time, CBS's stations in Boston, San Francisco, and Los Angeles produced national CBSN newscasts from their local facilities, and certain CBS News programs, such as CBS This Morning, were simulcast with the CBS network rather than delayed. The shutdown of the CBS Broadcast Center also limited CBSN New York's programming and forced WUPA's 10 p.m. newscast hubbed out of WCBS to become a simulcast of WSBK's 10 p.m. newscast as a substitute.

As part of the rebranding to the CBS News Streaming Network, CBS announced an expanded lineup of programming that includes revivals of Person to Person (hosted by then-CBS Evening News anchor Norah O'Donnell) and CBS Reports; Here Comes The Sun (which featured highlighted Sunday Morning segments); The Uplift, focused on inspirational stories; and programs based on the Eye on America and On the Road segments of the CBS Evening News. Existing programming such as Red & Blue expanded their use of CBS News correspondents, and material from 60 Minutes and 48 Hours were featured in the service's prime time programming. On September 6, 2022, CBS News Prime Time with John Dickerson began airing as part of the service's evening lineup on Mondays through Thursdays; on Fridays, the program's timeslot was occupied by CBS News Weekender.

Red & Blue was replaced with a new political program, America Decides, on May 1, 2023.

In April 2024, as part of its rebrand to CBS News 24/7, CBS announced a slate of new and expanded programming. America Decides was extended to a full hour, while Prime Time with John Dickerson was rebranded as The Daily Report with John Dickerson. Among the newly introduced programs was CBS News 24/7, positioned as the service’s central offering, beginning with two hours anchored by Vladimir Duthiers in New York at 10 a.m. ET and Reed Cowan in San Francisco at 1 p.m. ET. The network also announced CBS News Confirmed, which ultimately launched as a recurring segment within other programs rather than a standalone show. In addition, the late-night bulletin CBS News Roundup debuted, replacing the Overnight News as the network’s overnight news broadcast.

On September 4, 2024, CBS announced the launch of a third hour of CBS Mornings titled CBS Mornings Plus, which premiered on September 30. The additional hour also aired on select CBS stations.

On October 18, 2024, Lindsey Reiser succeeded John Dickerson as anchor of The Daily Report. Dickerson left the program to join the CBS Evening News.

On January 27, 2025, Mugo Odigwe joined CBS News 24/7 as an anchor. She had previously served as a reporter at CBS News Chicago and relocated to San Francisco as the network expanded its anchor team to support the growing 24/7 format.

On February 10, 2025, CBS introduced CBS Evening News Plus, a new half-hour extension of the CBS Evening News anchored by Dickerson. Like CBS Mornings Plus, it aired on select CBS stations.

In March 2025, CBS News 24/7 added another hour of live programming airing at 4 p.m. ET, anchored by Juliette Goodrich from San Francisco.

In May 2025, CBS announced The Takeout, a political talk show hosted by Major Garrett that premiered on May 27. Adapted from Garrett’s former weekly podcast of the same name, it replaced America Decides in its time slot. That same day, the network launched CBS News 24/7 Primetime, a 90-minute evening newscast anchored by Elizabeth Cook. With the debut of 24/7 Primetime, CBS News Bay Area surpassed New York in total produced programming hours.

On October 31, 2025, both CBS Mornings Plus and CBS Evening News Plus aired their final broadcasts. Beginning Monday, November 3, the CBS Morning News began airing as a rerun in the former CBS Mornings Plus time slot. Meanwhile, CBS News 24/7 Primetime was expanded to two hours to replace CBS Evening News Plus. Elizabeth Cook and Juliette Goodrich also exchanged time slots on CBS News 24/7 to better align with their broader anchoring responsibilities.

On December 2, 2025, the 9 a.m. rebroadcast of CBS Morning News was discontinued. The 10 a.m. hour of CBS News 24/7 was expanded to two hours, renamed CBS News 24/7 Mornings, and relocated to Studio 47. The outgoing 10 a.m. AR/VR-based hour of CBS News 24/7, the only one produced from New York, was often riddled with on-air hiccups and was considered technologically less advanced than the broadcasts originating from San Francisco, because CBS News Bay Area was the "innovation station" and developer for the then-brand new AR/VR format and had a larger studio space.

On January 9, 2026, CBS announced that Adriana Diaz and Kelly O’Grady would alternate as co-anchors alongside existing anchor Vladimir Duthiers. O’Grady debuted on January 13, followed by Diaz on January 14.

On February 25, 2026, select anchors on CBS News 24/7 began stating that viewers were watching "the #1 free streaming news service" at various points during their broadcasts—typically at the beginning, at the end of a block, and/or at the close of the program/end of the hour. The same claim was later added to the network’s on-air ident at the start of every commercial break. At times, the phrasing is altered to “the #1 free streaming news service in America,” though the usage is inconsistent, making it unclear which version is intended or what the claim specifically refers to. No substantiation for the claim has been released.

Following the expiration of their contract on March 9, 2026, the channel's unionized writers held a 24-hour walkout on March 17, and protested outside of the CBS Broadcast Center in New York City and at KPIX-TV, in San Francisco, interrupting live programming. CBS and Paramount signed a three year agreement with the Writers Guild of America East, pending a ratification vote by union members, on April 2.

== Programming & anchors ==
=== Current programming ===
CBS News 24/7 broadcasts a total of 11 hours of live, streaming-only programming every weekday across three studios:

- CBS News Bay Area—6 hours, serving as the primary location and airing all editions of CBS News 24/7 and 24/7 Primetime.
- CBS Broadcast Center—4 hours, with broadcasts scheduled at various times throughout the day, typically under specific program names.
- CBS News Washington Bureau—1 hour, airing The Takeout, a politics-focused show.

Current programming
Day	Time (ET)	Show	Exclusive	Anchor	Location	Notes
Weekdays	1:00 a.m.	CBS News Roundup	No			Airs first on CBS News 24/7, typically airing on CBS stations around 3:00 a.m. local time. Typically pre-recorded several hours in advance.
Weekdays	5:00 a.m.	CBS News Mornings	No			Tape-delayed by one hour from its live broadcast. On holidays, CBS News Mornings loops extensively until CBS Mornings is available.
Weekdays	7:00 a.m.	CBS Morning News	Yes	Errol Barnett	New York	The CBS Morning News pre-empts CBS Mornings for breaking news or live coverage.
Weekdays	8:00 a.m.	CBS Mornings	No			Tape-delayed by one hour from its live broadcast. A condensed one-hour version airs.
Weekdays	9:00 a.m.	CBS News 24/7 Mornings	Yes	Vladmir Duthiers, Adriana Diaz, Kelly O'Grady	New York	Diaz co-anchors on Mondays, Wednesdays, and Fridays, while O'Grady co-anchors on Tuesdays and Thursdays. The first hour is live, while most blocks of the second hour are typically reruns of the first hour.
Weekdays	11:00 a.m.	CBS News 24/7	Yes	Mugo Odigwe	San Francisco	Features a seamless transition from CBS News 24/7 Mornings, typically including a brief interaction between its anchors and Odigwe. The first hour is live, while most blocks of the second hour are typically reruns of the first hour. Reed Cowan joins Odigwe for a preview of the 1:00 p.m. show before the interstitial commercial break.
Weekdays	1:00 p.m.	CBS News 24/7	Yes	Reed Cowan	San Francisco	First hour is live; the show is rerun until 4:00 p.m. For breaking news during the reruns, Lindsey Reiser breaks in to anchor. Reiser previously anchored a half-hour block (featuring a similar rerun format) at 2:00 p.m.
Weekdays	4:00 p.m.	CBS News 24/7	Yes	Elizabeth Cook	San Francisco	Introduced as the "Four big headlines at 4." It has no effect or acknowledgement for the rest of the show.
Weekdays	5:00 p.m.	The Takeout	Yes	Major Garrett	Washington, D.C.	Named after Garrett's longtime weekly podcast, The Takeout. It is also released as an audio podcast every day. Includes some casual/lighthearted quirks like a shelf with ties, candy on the desk, and a dedicated sofa-chair space.
Weekdays	6:00 p.m.	The Daily Report	Yes	Lindsey Reiser	New York	Features a headlines segment with the voices of multiple 24/7 anchors "teasing" the upcoming stories. It is the only show that remains largely in the pre-24/7 revamp format.
Weekdays	7:00 p.m.	CBS News 24/7 Primetime	Yes	Juliette Goodrich	San Francisco	First 90 minutes are live, followed by a rerun of the 7:30 half-hour. Goodrich continues live at 8:30 p.m. if needed, and has stayed as late as 10:00 p.m. for live coverage overriding her other anchoring duties.
Weekdays	10:00 p.m.	CBS Evening News	No			Tape-delayed by 3.5 hours from its live broadcast.
Saturday	6:30 a.m.	The Uplift	Yes	Shanelle Kaul	New York	Billed as a production from CBS Mornings.
Saturday	9:00 a.m.	CBS Saturday Morning	No			Tape-delayed by 2 hours from its live broadcast.
Saturday	4:00 p.m.	48 Hours	No			Typically marathon reruns of past episodes, not that of the current week.
Weekends	10:00 p.m.	CBS Weekend News	No			Tape-delayed by 3.5 hours from its live broadcast.
Sunday	8:00 a.m.	CBS Sunday Morning	No			
Sunday	2:00 p.m.	Face the Nation	No			
Sunday	4:00 p.m.	60 Minutes	No			Typically marathon reruns of past episodes, not that of the current week.

=== Relief anchors ===
- Michael George² (anchor, CBS News Mornings)
- Shanelle Kaul² (correspondent)
- Matt Gutman² (correspondent)
- Sara Donchey¹ (anchor, CBS News Bay Area)
- Tom Hanson² (correspondent)
- Elaine Quijano² (correspondent)
- Meg Oliver² (correspondent)
- Jo Ling Kent² (correspondent)
- Jericka Duncan² (anchor, CBS Weekend News)
- Nikole Killion³ (political correspondent)
- Caitlin Huey-Burns³ (political correspondent)
- Nancy Cordes³ (political correspondent)
- Robert Costa³ (political correspondent)
- Weijia Jiang³ (political correspondent)
1. ¹Based in San Francisco.
2. ²Based in New York.
3. ³Based in Washington, D.C.

=== Notable former on-air staff ===
- Margaret Brennan – Launch anchor (now host of Face the Nation)
- Contessa Brewer – Anchor (now at CNBC)
- Don Dahler – Launch anchor
- Josh Elliott – Anchor (later presenter of First Responders Live)
- Jeff Glor – Launch anchor (left CBS News in September 2024)
- Michelle Miller – Launch anchor (later co-host of CBS Saturday Morning, left CBS News in November 2025)
- Reena Ninan – Anchor (now at CNN, Good Trouble Productions)
- Anne-Marie Green – Anchor (now at 48 Hours)
