= CBS Weekend News =

American television news program

- Genre: Weekend news show
- Directed by: Alfonso Casciello
- Presented by: Jericka Duncan
- Country of origin: United States
- Original language: English

Production
- Executive producer: Craig Wilson
- Production location: New York City
- Camera setup: Multi-camera
- Running time: 30 minutes

Original release
- Network: CBS
- Release: May 7, 2016 – present

CBS Weekend News (titled as CBS Weekend News with Jericka Duncan) is the branding used on the weekend editions of CBS Evening News, the flagship evening television news program of CBS News, the news division of the CBS television network in the United States. Weekend editions of CBS Evening News originally debuted on February 5, 1966. The network began using the CBS Weekend News branding on May 7, 2016, with a format that relies more on resources from CBS's streaming news channel CBS News 24/7, reports from local CBS affiliates, and highlights from the past week.

== History ==
CBS Evening News expanded to weekend evenings on February 5, 1966, originally anchored by Roger Mudd. The Sunday edition of the program was dropped in September 1971, when CBS began airing 60 Minutes in the 6:00 pm Eastern (5:00 pm Central) time slot to help affiliates fulfill requirements imposed by the Federal Communications Commission's Prime Time Access Rule. The Sunday edition returned in January 1976, when the network moved 60 Minutes one hour later to 7:00 pm Eastern Time, where that program remains (except when NFL on CBS is scheduled to air a doubleheader; on those Sundays, 60 Minutes is scheduled for 7:30 pm ET).

From 2011 to 2014, CBS Evening News was the only remaining network evening newscast that used separate anchors for its Saturday and Sunday editions (NBC Nightly News previously used separate anchors for both weekend broadcasts until John Seigenthaler was appointed anchor of both the Saturday and Sunday editions in 1999, while ABC World News Tonight maintained separate anchors for its weekend editions until Saturday anchor David Muir also assumed anchor duties on the program's Sunday edition in 2011). John Roberts did anchor both Saturday and Sunday editions of CBS Evening News for several months in 1999. More recently, Russ Mitchell served as the weekend anchor for CBS Evening News until December 2011, when he announced his resignation from CBS News to take a lead anchor position with NBC affiliate WKYC-TV in Cleveland, Ohio. The following year, Mitchell was replaced on the weekend editions by Jim Axelrod on Saturdays and Jeff Glor on Sundays.

Weekend editions of CBS Evening News were periodically abbreviated or pre-empted outright due to CBS Sports programming. On May 2, 2016, CBS announced that the weekend editions of CBS Evening News, effective May 7, would be revamped as CBS Weekend News, with the Saturday and Sunday editions anchored by Reena Ninan and Elaine Quijano, respectively. (The Saturday edition airs only on the West Coast from September through mid-December due to CBS's college football coverage; the Sunday edition similarly only airs on the West Coast most weeks from September through January due to the network's NFL coverage, except when a doubleheader is not scheduled.) The new program would rely on resources from CBS's streaming news channel CBSN (now CBS News 24/7), as well as reports from local affiliates, and highlights from the past week. CBS News executive editor Steve Capus argued, "given the number of sports overruns and out-and-out pre-emptions, it would be better for us as a news organization to come up with what I think is a smarter, 24-hour approach to covering the world, and making sure we've got all the bases covered."

== Impact of COVID-19 ==
In March 2020, the COVID-19 pandemic caused the temporary shutdown of the CBS Broadcast Center after a number of CBS News staffers tested positive for the virus. While the network did reopen the facility for a brief period, further positive tests along with a number of corporate directives by CBS News President Susan Zirinsky resulted in a second, indefinite shutdown of the Broadcast Center. With no live weekend sporting events for the next three months (primarily due to the cancellation of CBS's March Madness coverage, as well as the temporary pause of the 2019–20 PGA Tour season) resulting in no likely sports pre-emptions, production of CBS Weekend News was dramatically altered with CBS News staffers outsourcing certain production services to select CBS-owned stations and affiliates, who would originate the newscasts from the stations' respective studios with the station or affiliate's main anchors serving as the program's anchor for the weekend. The usage of local CBS stations and affiliates was, in part, to reduce the pressure on CBS News' Washington, DC, bureau, where the weeknight CBS Evening News is based, as it had already taken on increased responsibilities during the pandemic.

These CBS affiliates assisted with production of CBS Weekend News from March 14 until May 31:

- March 14–15: KCBS Los Angeles (CBS O&O)
- March 21–22 and 28-29: KTVT Fort Worth-Dallas (CBS O&O)
- April 4–5: KCNC Denver (CBS O&O)
- April 11–12: KHOU Houston
- April 18–19: WGCL Atlanta
- April 25–26: WUSA Washington, D.C.
- May 2–3: KIRO Seattle
- May 9–10: WTTV Indianapolis
- May 16–17: KOIN Portland, Oregon
- May 23–24: KOVR Sacramento (CBS O&O)
- May 30–31: KMOV St. Louis

From June 7, 2020 (a special Saturday edition of CBS Evening News covering the weekend's George Floyd protests aired the previous day), until December 2020, with CBS Sports set to resume live coverage of the PGA Tour, CBS News resumed full production of CBS Weekend News with either chief Washington correspondent Major Garrett or Los Angeles correspondent Jamie Yuccas presiding as anchor, as production for all CBS News programs from the CBS Broadcast Center remained suspended. On December 4, 2020, CBS News announced correspondents Adriana Diaz and Jericka Duncan would be promoted into permanent anchor positions, with Diaz leading the Saturday edition from the network's Chicago bureau at WBBM-TV and from the network's Washington, D.C. Bureau WUSA later, and Duncan leading the Sunday edition from the CBS Broadcast Center. Diaz left CBS Weekend News in September 2024 to become a co-host for CBS Mornings Plus; Nancy Chen filled in for the following three Saturdays. On October 4, CBS News announced that Jericka Duncan would add the program's Saturday edition to her Sunday evening duties; despite major upheaval with the weekday counterpart of the newscast in 2025, Duncan remains the weekend anchor as of 2026.

== Anchors ==
Saturdays

- Roger Mudd (1966–1973)
- Dan Rather (1973–1976)
- Bob Schieffer (1976–1996)
- Paula Zahn (1996–1999)
- John Roberts (1999)
- Anthony Mason (1999)
- Harry Smith (1999)
- Thalia Assuras (1999–2008)
- Troy Roberts (1999)
- Jeff Glor (2008–2010)
- Russ Mitchell (1999–2011)
- Jim Axelrod (2012–2016)
- Reena Ninan (2016–2020)
- Adriana Diaz (2020–2024)
- Jericka Duncan (2024–present)

Sundays

- Dan Rather (1976)
- Bob Schieffer (1976)
- Morton Dean (1976–1984)
- Susan Spencer (1985–1989)
- Connie Chung (1989–1993)
- Anthony Mason (1993–1995)
- Bill Plante (1993-1995)
- Deborah Norville (1993–1995)
- Sharyl Attkisson (1993–1995)
- John Roberts (1995–2006)
- Russ Mitchell (1993–1995, 2006–2011)
- Jeff Glor (2012–2016)
- Elaine Quijano (2016–2020)
- Jericka Duncan (2020–present)
