= Dawn Stensland-Mendte =

American journalist

- Occupations: Television talk show host, news anchor
- Spouse: Larry Mendte (m. 2000)
- Children: 2

Dawn Stensland Mendte is an American television talk show host and news anchor working at WJLP-TV in Freehold, New Jersey, and on WPHT 1210 AM in Philadelphia. She is also a past anchor of CBS Saturday Morning. Stensland-Mendte has anchored the news at TV stations across the country including WBBM-TV in Chicago, KYW-TV and WTXF-TV in Philadelphia and WKYC-TV in Cleveland. She is married to Larry Mendte, a radio talk show host, TV news commentator and news anchor.

== Biography ==
=== Education ===
Born in Chicago, Illinois, her family moved quite a bit in her school years to Charlotte, North Carolina, Raleigh, North Carolina and Farmington, Minnesota, where Dawn graduated from Farmington High School. Stensland-Mendte earned a B.A. in journalism from the University of Minnesota, where she was president of the school's Society of Professional Journalists chapter.

=== Career ===
Stensland started her television career at KSTP-TV in Minneapolis, when she earned the one paid internship that the station awards every year. She was hired as a producer and anchor at WREX-TV in Rockford, Illinois, and at WKOW-TV in Madison, Wisconsin, where she also hosted the Sunday morning political talk show, "Capitol City Sunday."

She was the main anchor at WINK-TV in Fort Myers, Florida, before being hired by WBBM-TV, the CBS owned-and-operated station in Chicago, where she was an anchor and reporter. Next, she was hired by WKYC-TV in Cleveland to co-anchor the 6 and 11 o'clock newscasts.

=== Philadelphia ===
Stensland-Mendte is best known for her anchoring in Philadelphia. From 1997 to 2000, she co-anchored the 5 and 6 o'clock newscasts with Ukee Washington and Larry Kane at KYW-TV, CBS's Philadelphia outlet. While she was at KYW-TV, Stensland-Mendte also co-hosted CBS News Saturday Morning with Russ Mitchell. In 2000, she was hired by WTXF-TV, the Fox owned and operated station in Philadelphia, to be the main anchor. Stensland-Mendte anchored the award-winning, top rated 10 o'clock newscast for nearly a decade.

Since 2010, Stensland-Mendte has been the TV spokesperson for Dreambaby child safety products, manufactured by the Australian Company Tee-Zed. In September, 2012, Stensland-Mendte started hosting her own talk show, "A New Dawn," on WMCN-TV, a ShopHQ-affiliated station with studios in Cherry Hill, New Jersey, a suburb of Philadelphia. In March, 2013 WMCN changed the name of the show to simply "Dawn."

Stensland-Mendte is now heard on WPHT talk radio as the news anchor of the Rich Zeoli morning show, and hosting the 10 a.m. to noon slot. She can also be seen as a featured reporter and host on Jersey Matters, a public affairs show at WJLP-TV in Freehold, New Jersey.

=== Congress ===
In 2010, Stensland-Mendte made headlines in Philadelphia when she was approached to run as a Republican in Pennsylvania's 7th congressional district. She would have run in a primary against Pat Meehan, who was the U.S. Attorney, overseeing the case against her husband. After a flurry of new reports and columns, Stensland-Mendte decided not to run.

=== Family ===
Stensland-Mendte has been married to Larry Mendte since 2000. Together, they have two children, both sons; Michael was born in 2004, and David was born in 2006. She is also a step-mom to Mendte's two adult children, Stacia and Jonathan, from a previous relationship.

Media offices
Preceded by Jill Chernikoff & Rich Noonan	WTXF-TV Fox29 10 O'clock News anchor 2000 - 2009; With: Dave Huddleston	Succeeded by Kerri Lee-Halkett & Thomas Drayton
