= Meg Oliver =

American journalist

- Born: Megan Elisabeth Oliver; December 7, 1970 (age 55); Birmingham, Michigan, United States
- Education: University of Montana (BA)
- Years active: 1993–present
- Employers: KCFW-TV (1993–1995); Northwest Cable News (1995–1997); WTIC-TV (1997–1998); WWJ-TV/WKBD-TV (1998–2001); KGPE-TV (2001–2004); CBS News (2005–2009; 2015–present); ABC News (2009–2012)
- Notable work: CBS Mornings; CBS Evening News; CBS Saturday Morning; CBS News 24/7 (the network's streaming news service)
- Spouse: John Basinger (m. 2005)
- Children: 3
- Website: x.com/megoliver

Megan Elisabeth "Meg" Oliver (born December 7, 1970) is an American television correspondent and anchor. She returned to CBS News in 2015. She currently reports for CBS This Morning, the CBS Evening News weekend and fills in anchoring for their 24-hour digital network by CBSN. On CBSN she has covered extensive live breaking news from the San Bernardino shootings to the murders of WDBJ's Allison Parker and Adam Ward. In March 2006, she became anchor of the overnight CBS newscast, Up to the Minute, and remained in that position for three years. She was also a correspondent for The Early Show, and fill in anchor. She left CBS in 2009 and worked at ABC News as a correspondent. She reported for Good Morning America Weekend Edition and ABC World News Tonight with David Muir. She also filled in anchoring on ABC World News Now.

== Early life and education ==
Born in Birmingham, Michigan, in 1970. She earned a Bachelor of Arts degree in Journalism from the University of Montana.

== Career ==
From 1993 to 1995, Oliver worked in Kalispell, Montana, as a reporter and anchor for KCFW-TV. From 1995 to 1997, she worked for Northwest Cable News at offices in Seattle, Washington, and Boise, Idaho.

From 1997 to 1998, Oliver worked as a reporter in Hartford, Connecticut, at WTIC-TV. From 1998 to 2001, she served as reporter and anchor for WWJ-TV and WKBD-TV in Detroit, Michigan. From 2001 to 2004, Oliver served as weekday anchor at KGPE-TV in Fresno, California.

Starting in May 2005, she worked in Washington, D.C., as a freelance reporter for CBS Newspath. In March 2006, Oliver was named anchor of CBS News' Up to the Minute. Oliver resides in New York with her husband and three children.

During the March 20, 2009, broadcast of Up to the Minute, Oliver announced it would be her last night as the anchor.
