= Hattie Kauffman =

American journalist

Hattie Kauffman is an American journalist. A member of the Nez Perce people, she was the first Native American to file a report on a national news broadcast.

== Early life ==
She spent the first three years of her life on the Nez Perce Reservation in Lapwai, Idaho before moving to Seattle with her mother.

Kauffman attended the University of Minnesota because "it was the only university in the country that offered a bachelor’s degree in American Indian studies." She continued her education at the University of Minnesota School of Journalism and Mass Communication under a WCCO-TV Minorities in Broadcasting Scholarship.

== Career overview ==
Kauffman started her career on college radio at the University of Minnesota. She then began to report and anchor for KING 5 News in Seattle, earning four Emmy Awards. From there, she went to Good Morning America in 1987 as a Special Correspondent and substitute anchor. In 1990, she began working at CBS News as a correspondent and substitute anchor on CBS This Morning. She spent two decades at CBS, reporting for 48 Hours, Street Stories, Sunday Morning, CBS Radio, CBS Special Reports, The Early Show, and CBS Evening News. Her memoir, Falling Into Place, was released in September 2013.
