= CBS This Morning =

American morning television program (1987–1999 and 2012–2021)

- Genre: News program
- Created by: Jeff Fager; David Rhodes; Chris Licht
- Directed by: Shanta Fripp
- Presented by: Weekday; Gayle King; Tony Dokoupil; (for past weekday anchors, see section); Saturday; Dana Jacobson; Michelle Miller; Jeff Glor; (for past Saturday anchors, see CBS Saturday Morning)
- No. of episodes: 3,100 (1987–1999); 2,521 (2012–2021)

Production
- Executive producer: Shawna Thomas
- Production locations: Studio 57; CBS Broadcast Center; New York City, New York
- Camera setup: Multiple-camera setup
- Running time: 120 minutes (including commercials)
- Production company: CBS News

Original release
- Network: CBS
- Release: November 30, 1987 – October 29, 1999
- Release: January 9, 2012 – September 6, 2021

Related
- The Morning Program (1987) (first incarnation); The Early Show (1999–2012) (second incarnation); CBS Mornings (second incarnation); CBS Evening News; CBS News Mornings; CBS News Roundup

CBS This Morning (CTM) is an American morning television program that aired on CBS from November 30, 1987, to October 29, 1999, and again from January 9, 2012, to September 6, 2021. On November 1, 1999, the original incarnation was replaced by The Early Show, which was replaced by the second incarnation of CBS This Morning on January 9, 2012.

The second incarnation emphasized general national and international news stories and in-depth reports throughout each edition, although it also included live in-studio and pre-taped interviews. The format was chosen as an alternative to the soft media and lifestyle-driven formats of competitors Today and Good Morning America following the first hour or half-hour of those broadcasts, in an attempt to give the program a competitive edge with its infotainment format. It was the 10th distinct weekday morning news format aired on CBS since 1954, and the ninth attempt to do so since CBS resumed programming in that time slot since 1963. For all but a few periods since 1963, CBS has historically placed a distant third in the ratings among the network weekday morning shows.

On August 31, 2021, CBS announced that the weekday program would be replaced with the reformatted CBS Mornings effective September 7, while the Saturday edition of CBS This Morning was renamed CBS Saturday Morning on September 18, 2021, completing the transition.

== History ==
=== First incarnation and The Early Show ===
The original incarnation of CBS This Morning made its debut on November 30, 1987, with hosts Harry Smith, former Good Morning America news anchor Kathleen Sullivan, and Mark McEwen, a holdover from the show's infotainment-intensive predecessor The Morning Program as weather caster and announcer. Sullivan was replaced by Paula Zahn on February 26, 1990. For almost all of its run, it stayed in third place in the ratings. However, it was usually far more competitive than its eight predecessors in the morning slot had been.

Beginning on October 26, 1992, in an effort to prevent affiliates from dropping the program, CBS increased the amount of time available during the broadcast for local stations, most of which broadcast their own early morning news programs before the national news begins. Nevertheless, several CBS stations in top-ranking markets, like then-affiliates WJBK in Detroit, WAGA in Atlanta, WHDH in Boston and KDKA in Pittsburgh (as of 2022, still a CBS station) dropped the program in favor of either local or syndicated programming. KDKA would resume airing the program in the summer of 1995. Another station, KPIX in San Francisco, planned in 1994 to still broadcast CBS This Morning, but from 4:00 a.m. to 6:00 a.m. PST as the lead-in to its morning program.

Smith and Zahn left the program on June 14, 1996, with various CBS News correspondents Harold Dow, Erin Moriarty, John Roberts, Russ Mitchell, Hattie Kauffman, Mark McEwen and Jane Robelot anchoring CBS This Morning for seven weeks until a new format was in place. In August 1996, the program was revamped again, as simply This Morning, with Mark McEwen and Jane Robelot as co-hosts, news anchor José Díaz-Balart (succeeded by Cynthia Bowers, then Thalia Assuras, and finally Julie Chen) and Craig Allen (of WCBS-TV and WCBS-AM in New York City) serving as weather anchor.

A new format allowed local stations to air their own newscasts from 7:00 a.m. to 8:00 a.m. local time, interspersed with inserts from the national broadcast; the second hour of the national broadcast would then air uninterrupted from 8:00 a.m. to 9:00 a.m. Ratings went up slightly, and at one point in 1998 the program even moved ahead of Good Morning America. But its ratings success was also brief, and CBS announced its decision to cancel the program in early 1999. Robelot left This Morning in June 1999 after it was revealed that the program would be replaced. Assuras served as co-anchor and Chen as newsreader for the show's remaining five months. McEwen left the show at the end of September 1999 to prepare for the launch of The Early Show and was replaced by Russ Mitchell, who formerly conducted sports segments.

This Morning ended on October 29, 1999 after twelve years. It was replaced by The Early Show, which debuted the following Monday, November 1. Though it had occasional peaks in the ratings, The Early Show was a perennial third-place finisher behind NBC's Today and ABC's Good Morning America. In its last year, The Early Show shied away from the news, features, light stories and "infotainment" approach used by the program since its debut, that it based on the formats of its two main competitors.

=== Development and revival ===
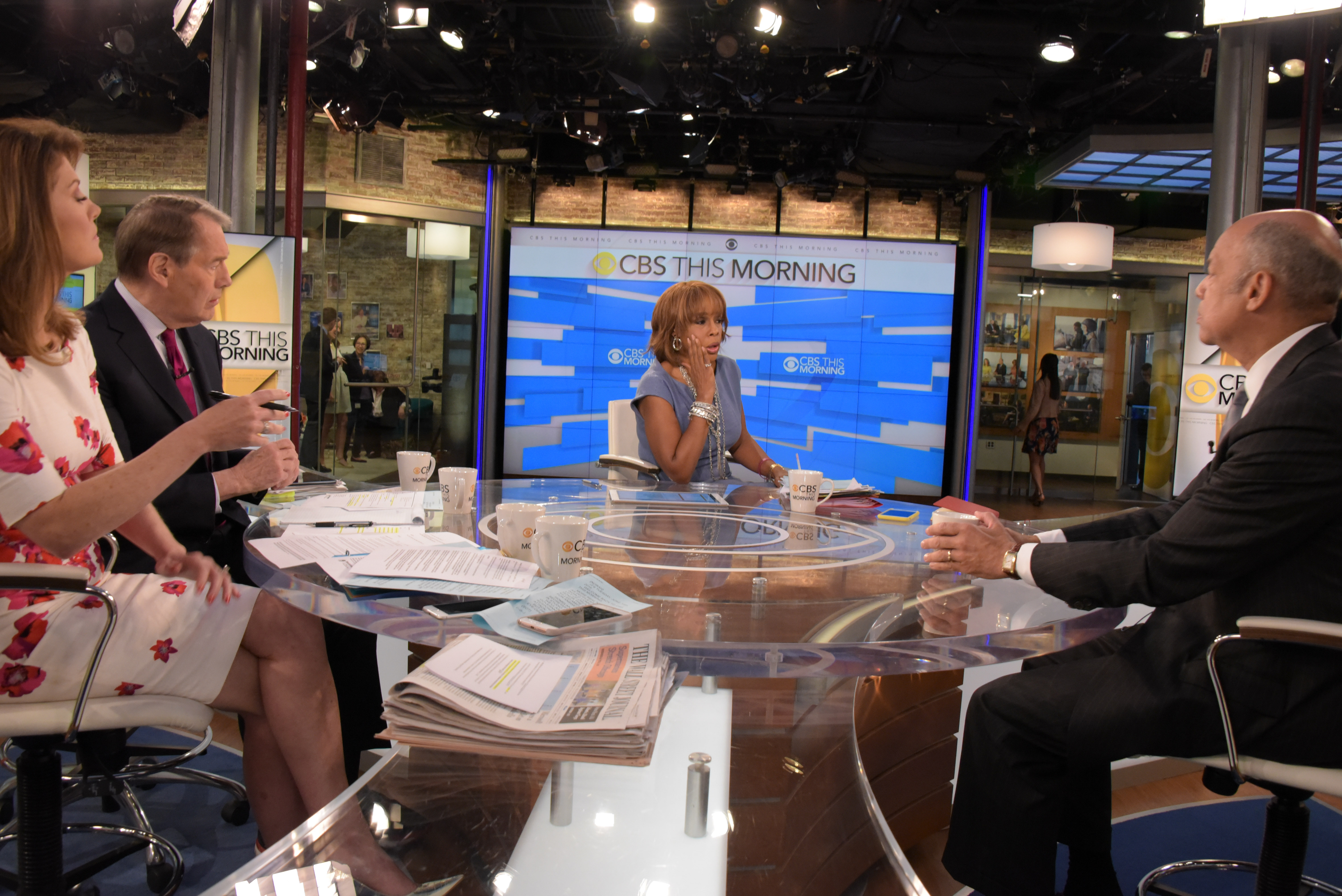
Homeland Security Jeh Johnson participates in an interview in 2016

On November 15, 2011, CBS News announced that The Early Show would be cancelled, and that the news division would overhaul its morning news program effective January 9, 2012. The news division's chairman Jeff Fager and president David Rhodes revealed at the official announcement that day that the revamped and retitled program would "redefine the morning television landscape" – meaning that rather than replicate the relaxed lifestyle-driven styles of Today and Good Morning America, the new format would feature a mix of "hard news" (a CBS News hallmark), analysis and discussion. On December 1, 2011, the title of the new show was revealed as CBS This Morning, marking a return of the name to the morning newscast since 1999.

The founding executive producer of CBS This Morning was Chris Licht, who was hired by CBS in the spring of 2011 after serving as executive producer of MSNBC's morning news-discussion program Morning Joe. Licht's move to CBS led to speculation that Morning Joe hosts Joe Scarborough and Mika Brzezinski would follow Licht to CBS, as their contracts with MSNBC were set to expire; though Scarborough and Brzezinski confirmed contemplating offers from CBS and other networks, they signed a new contract with MSNBC out of a belief that their interview-intensive approach could not be duplicated on broadcast television.

CBS instead tapped a trio of noted television veterans for the weekday edition of CBS This Morning: The Early Show holdover Erica Hill, Gayle King and Charlie Rose. Licht described Rose, who had previously hosted CBS's former overnight news program CBS News Nightwatch (which was replaced by Up to the Minute and later CBS Overnight News) in the 1980s, and had also served as a part-time correspondent for occasional segments since 2008 on the long-running newsmagazine 60 Minutes, as "an incredible interviewer".

Licht promised an "outside the box" approach to CBS This Morning, insisting that the show would not include forced anchor banter, cooking segments, "comedic weather forecasters, [or] cheering fans on an outdoor plaza."

=== Since revival ===
Logo used from 2012 to 2015

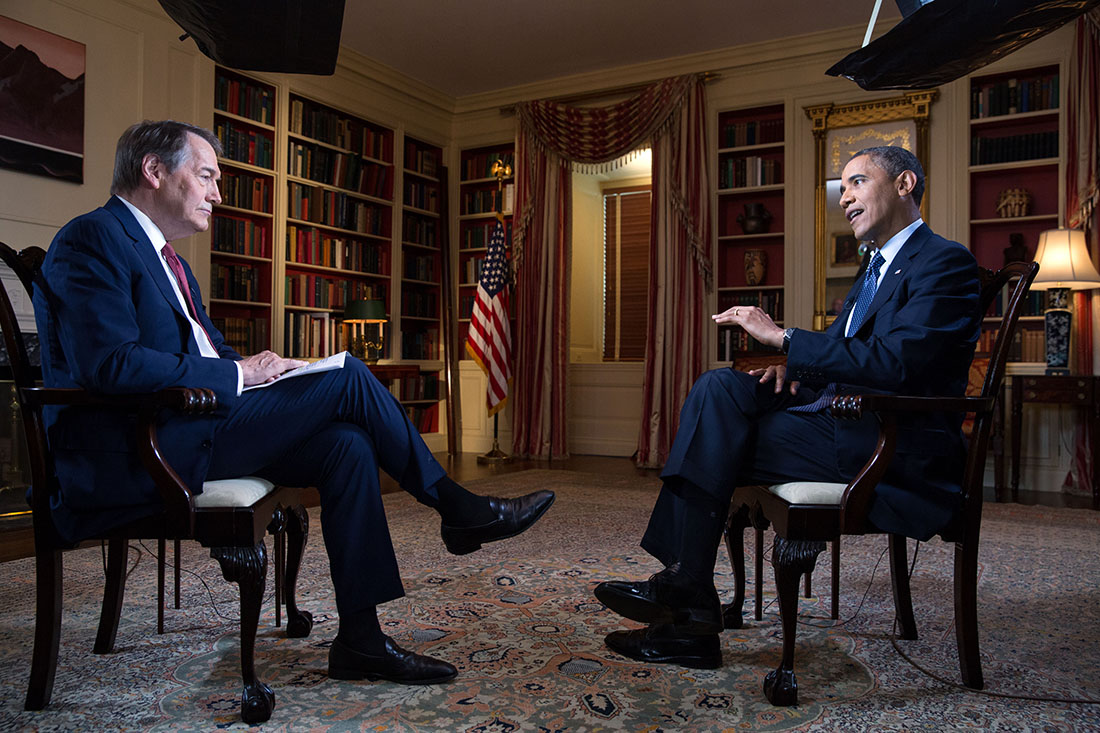
Charlie Rose interviewing President Barack Obama in 2013

On July 26, 2012, CBS announced that its Chief White House Correspondent Norah O'Donnell would replace Hill starting in September 2012. Hill was pulled from the program immediately after the announcement (an absence which was not explained on the broadcast), and was eventually released from her CBS contract (Hill joined NBC in November 2012, becoming a co-host of weekend editions of Today).

On November 20, 2017, Rose was fired by CBS following a report in The Washington Post in which eight women accused him of sexual harassment. King and O'Donnell addressed the issue on the show. In January 2018, it was announced that John Dickerson (moderator of Face the Nation) would join the program as the third co-anchor. On October 3, 2018, it was announced that correspondent Bianna Golodryga would be joining the show as the fourth co-host. However, six months later, in April 2019, Golodryga chose to leave CBS News.

On May 6, 2019, it was announced that Dickerson and O'Donnell would leave CBS This Morning, with Dickerson moving to 60 Minutes and O'Donnell to CBS Evening News. Anthony Mason and Tony Dokoupil were named as successors, and made their debuts on May 20, 2019, alongside King. O'Donnell's last day on the show was May 16, 2019, followed by Dickerson on May 17, 2019.

CBS announced several planned changes to the program in 2021, including a move to a new studio at One Astor Plaza in Times Square, and a new co-host in Nate Burleson with Mason moving to a role as reporter on culture. On August 31, the network announced that CBS This Morning would instead be succeeded by a new program, CBS Mornings, starting September 7. The reconfigured program retained the social media and YouTube channels created for CBS This Morning.

The transition was completed on September 18, 2021 when CBS This Morning Saturday was rebranded as CBS Saturday Morning.

== Format ==
Both hours began with the "EyeOpener - Your World According To Us", a fast-paced 90-second video montage of the day's top stories, ending with overnight sports highlights clips and quips from late-night talk shows. The first hour of the show was more news-intensive, with more original journalism and analysis than the second hour. The 8:00 hour began with the "EyeOpener @ 8", recaps the first hour's news, leads into a brief summary of the morning's news headlines, and then shifts its focus to interviews and discussion (à la Morning Joe) and lighter fare.

=== Weather reports ===
True to Licht's "no comedic weather" promise, the show did not include any standalone national weather segments – this made CBS This Morning the only national morning news program on any of the "Big Three" networks not to include such a segment, although time was allotted for CBS affiliates to insert their own local weather forecasts (with national maps and forecasts or a text-only list of forecasts for individual cities nationwide provided for affiliates that do not insert their own weather updates, particularly those that do not have a news department).

However, the program would use local meteorologists from CBS stations to provide the forecast during major severe weather events (such as hurricanes, wildfires, and blizzards). Lonnie Quinn (former meteorologist for the program's Saturday edition) of flagship New York City O&O WCBS-TV - appears weekdays (as needed), and Jeff Berardelli, CBS News Weather and Climate Specialist, works the Saturday edition (when necessary).

=== Local news cutaways ===
For stations that do not make use of the local news cutaways at :26 and :56 past the hour (including CBS affiliates that do not have a news department), the program used a taped story introduced by that day's CBS Morning News anchor during that time; previously it contained a happy talk segment between the anchors and panelists. This was similar to what was done during the 1981-87 run of the CBS Morning News.

=== West coast ===
For the Pacific, Alaska and Hawaii–Aleutian Time Zones (along with most of Arizona during daylight saving time), an updated version of the broadcast incorporated an additional greeting to those viewers ("Good morning to our viewers in the West!" and "As you are waking up in the West..."), along with updated reports previously denoted by the reporter specifically acknowledging the viewers in that part of the country (e.g., "Good morning and Good morning to our viewers watching us in the West") and if occurring, reports on major swings, high or low, involving the stock market, with the time and temperature bug also incorporating a real-time Dow Jones/NASDAQ tracker.

=== Studio ===
"With a wall this big, something important better be happening on the inside.
There is.
Sorry for the mess. We're busy building you a better morning."

— A message adorning the CBS Broadcast Center, as featured in a December 2011 promo for CBS This Morning

CBS This Morning operates out of a set in Studio 57 at the CBS Broadcast Center (numbered for the street address in Manhattan, West 57th Street). The new set was originally planned for use by The Early Show before its cancellation; that program was based out of the windowed General Motors Building during its entire run, which was shared with the network's NFL pre-game show The NFL Today at times, though during the final year of The Early Show the windows were covered at all times due to the change to a hard-news focus. A section of the studio's exterior, covered in white walls and adorned with the CBS Eye logo (and also bearing the message shown at right), was featured in promos for the show that began airing in early December 2011. CBS Evening News has shared Studio 57 with CBS This Morning since December 2016, when the former program moved from its longtime home at Studio 47.

Bits and pieces of the CBS This Morning set were revealed in promos and web videos released prior to the program's debut, with the full set unveiled during the January 2012 premiere. Some of the set's features include:

- Real exposed brick walls and dark hardwood flooring
- An in-the-round anchor desk, topped in clear lucite and etched with the famous "Eyemark", as well as additional "prong" sections which can be removed if necessary
- Moveable monitors, allowing guests who appear via satellite to "sit" alongside their interviewers at the anchor desk
- Various items representing CBS News's legacy (most prominently a world map from the venerated Walter Cronkite tenure of the CBS Evening News)
- An adjoining newsroom (which was not ready in time for the premiere), complete with large windows facing the street (allowing passers-by to look in)
- A visible green room (complete with the only couch on the set), allowing viewers to catch a glimpse of behind-the-scenes action

Also included on the set, as reported by TV Guide reporter Stephen Battaglio, is an Oakland Athletics baseball cap; executive producer Chris Licht included it to remind his staff of the sports film Moneyball, whose central character (team executive Billy Beane, played in the film by Brad Pitt) took an "outside-the-box" approach that Licht hopes CBS This Morning replicates (Licht has called the show "The Moneyball of TV" – a take-off on the methodology featured in the 2011 film – and screened the film prior to the premiere for CBS This Morning staff as a motivational tool).

In the wake of the COVID-19 pandemic in the United States and the associated closure of the CBS Broadcast Center on March 11, 2020, CBS This Morning was briefly re-located to the Washington, D.C. studio of the CBS Evening News for two editions. After the facility was closed once more on March 18, the program began broadcasting from the Ed Sullivan Theater on the set of The Late Show with Stephen Colbert (where Licht now serves as producer), before switching to a remote work format. On June 22, CBS This Morning returned to Studio 57 with a reduced crew.

== Notable on-air staff ==
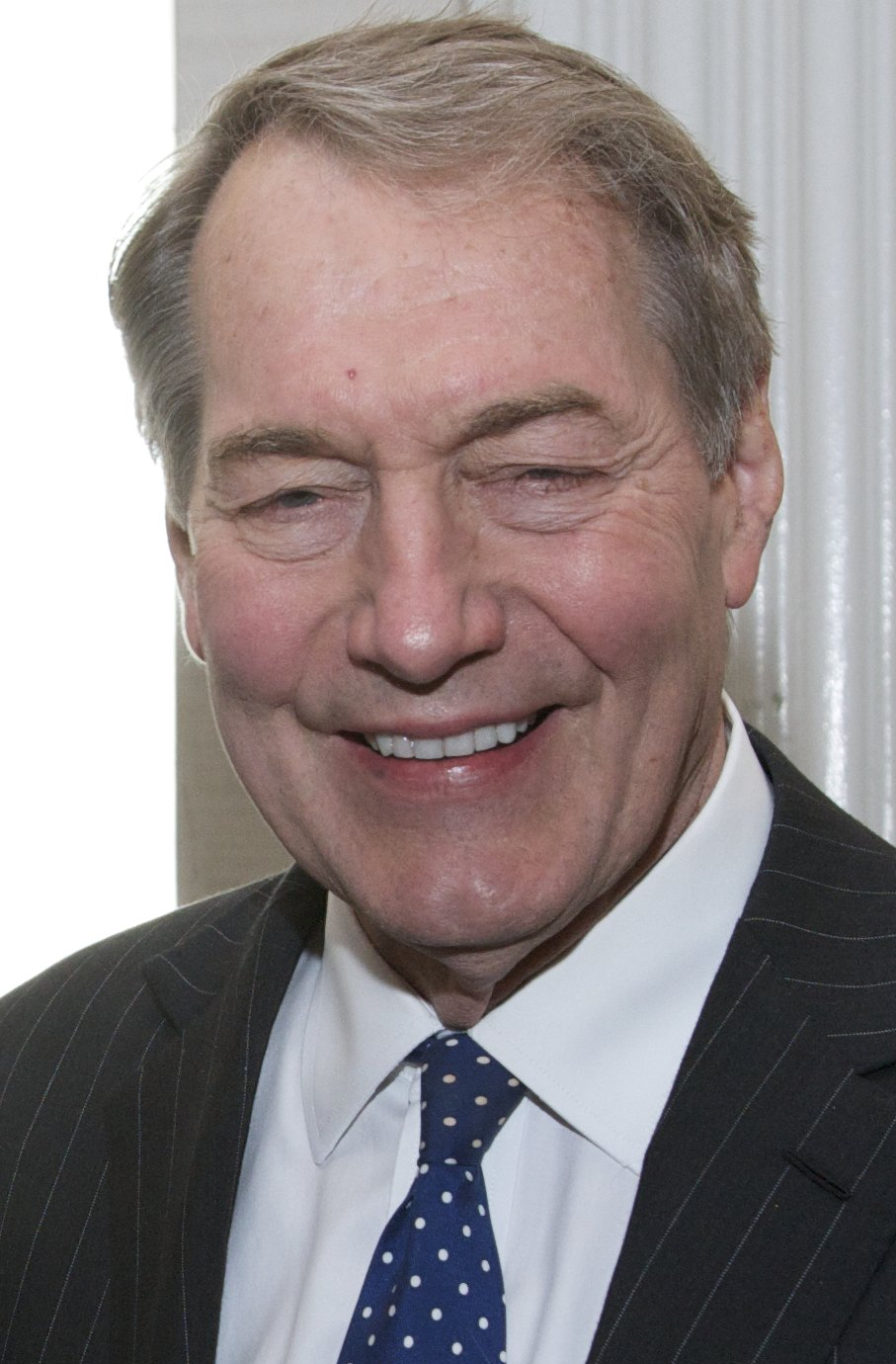
Charlie Rose (pictured in 2014) was fired by CBS, PBS, and Bloomberg in 2017 following sexual harassment claims from eight different women.

The second incarnation of the program was originally hosted by Charlie Rose, Erica Hill and Gayle King. Hill left the show about six months following its debut, and was replaced by Norah O'Donnell. In November 2017, Rose was suspended and subsequently fired following sexual harassment accusations made against him becoming public knowledge. Upon Rose's firing, various anchors have filled the third spot on a rotating basis. On January 9, 2018, CBS News president David Rhodes announced that former Face the Nation host John Dickerson would join Gayle King and Norah O'Donnell as the third co-anchor of CBS This Morning. It was announced on October 3, 2018, that correspondent Bianna Golodryga would be joining the show as the fourth co-host. However, six months later, in April 2019, Golodryga chose to leave CBS News. On May 6, 2019, it was announced that Dickerson and O'Donnell would leave CBS This Morning, with Anthony Mason and Tony Dokoupil named as successors. O'Donnell's last day on the show was May 16, 2019, followed by Dickerson on May 17, 2019.

=== Final ===
- Gayle King
- Tony Dokoupil

=== Former ===
- Harry Smith – anchor (1987–1996) (later at NBC News, now retired)
- Kathleen Sullivan – anchor (1987–1990) (later at E!)
- Paula Zahn – anchor (1990–1996) (later at Fox News Channel and CNN; now at Investigation Discovery)
- Harold Dow – interim anchor (1996) (deceased)
- Erin Moriarty – interim anchor (1996)
- John Roberts – interim anchor (1996)
- Hattie Kauffman – interim anchor (1996)
- Mark McEwen – anchor (1996–1999; previous worked as weather and entertainment reporter from 1987 to 1996)
- Jane Robelot – anchor (1996–1999) (later at WGCL-TV; now at WYFF-TV)
- Thalia Assuras – anchor (1999; previously worked as newsreader from 1996 to 1999)
- Russ Mitchell – anchor (1999; previously worked as sports reporter) (now at WKYC)
- Erica Hill – co-host (January–July 2012; later at NBC News; now at CNN)
- Charlie Rose – co-host (2012–2017; fired by CBS and PBS after sexual misconduct allegations revealed by The Washington Post)
- Norah O'Donnell – co host (September 2012–May 2019) (currently on CBS Mornings)
- Bianna Golodryga – co-host (October 2018–April 2019) (now a contributor on CNN)
- John Dickerson – co-host (2018–2019) (now retired)
- Anthony Mason – co-host (2019–2021) (currently on cultural correspondent role)

=== Correspondents ===
- John Miller – Senior Correspondent (resigned from CBS in 2014 to take a position with the New York Police Department)
- David Begnaud – Lead National Correspondent
- Jericka Duncan – National Correspondent
- Vladimir Duthiers – "What to Watch"
- Anna Werner – Consumer Investigative Correspondent

== Saturday edition ==
CBS This Morning Saturday is the Saturday edition of the program, which premiered under that title on January 14, 2012 and is currently anchored by Michelle Miller and Dana Jacobson.

Like the weekend editions of other network morning shows, the program has a greater focus on human-interest pieces than on weekdays, though it still concentrates primarily on the news of the day during the first half-hour. It also retains some of the common features of the morning show genre which were removed from the weekday show, such as musical performances and food segments.

An exception to the usual Saturday format occurred on February 2, 2013 (the day before Super Bowl XLVII), when the weekday anchor team hosted from New Orleans (where the game was held at the Mercedes-Benz Superdome), an edition that was branded as simply CBS This Morning (instead of CBS This Morning Saturday) and was formatted similarly to the weekday program, including "EyeOpener" segments at the top of both hours.

CBS This Morning did not produce a Sunday edition as a result of the long-running CBS News Sunday Morning, a newsmagazine that debuted in 1979 (and is a remnant of a short-lived reformatting of the original CBS Morning News broadcast that lasted until 1982). In contrast to CBS This Morning, CBS News Sunday Morning has long led the ratings among the Sunday morning shows.

== Broadcast ==
In the Southern Hemisphere, in the Commonwealth of Australia, a trimmed version (for 70 minutes excluding commercials) of the CBS This Morning weekday edition aired on CBS's sister network (since November 2017) Network 10, along with regional affiliates Southern Cross 10, and from July 2016 to July 2021 WIN, on Monday - Friday mornings from 4:30 a.m. until 6:00 a.m. AEST with the Friday edition held over to the following Monday. A national weather map of Australia was inserted during local affiliate station's cutaways for weather reports and forecasts. Commercial advertising was inserted instead of the usual cutaway to the local news programming, however, near-simultaneously with the other US's major "Big Three" television networks' breakfast / morning television programs, along with ABC-TV's longtime Good Morning America (broadcasting in U.S. since 1976) on the Nine Network from 3:30 a.m. and the NBC's Today longtime morning news/features show (since 1952, of NBC) airing on the Seven Network from 4:00 am. It was subject to preemption in regional areas for paid and religious programming. Until recent March 2020, the program was broadcast weekday mornings from 4:30 a.m. to 6:00 a.m., with the Friday edition usually held over to the following Monday. As a result of Network 10's plans to give local mid morning program Studio 10 a natural lead in for watching by Australian viewers, the program would now air four days a week, in direct competition to rivals of Network Seven's Sunrise and Nine's Today (Australian version), with encores of CBS daytime soap opera dramas The Bold and the Beautiful to air for two hours on Monday mornings from 6:00 a.m. This programming move, however, was short-lived; as of July 2020, the program has been bumped back to 4:30 a.m. to 6:00 a.m. airing five days a week, with encores of fellow CBS programs including daytime talk show The Talk, Entertainment Tonight, Judge Judy, and The Bold and the Beautiful following the program. Unlike the Nine Network and Seven Network, the weekend edition was not shown.

== Reception ==
The format of CBS This Morning was praised by Associated Press critic Frazier Moore, noting the network was differentiating itself from its competitors with its focus on hard news: "CBS This Morning has, in effect, vowed to keep the silliness to a minimum, and its first week is promising." He noted the absence of tabloid news items, saying "[what] CBS This Morning didn't have – that, too, provides a good argument for watching." Gail Shister of TVNewser gave Charlie Rose "an A for effort" for stretching past his usual slate of hard news into pop-culture stories. Shister concluded, "CBS is not reinventing morning TV. But at least they're trying, and that, in itself, is good news."

== Awards and nominations ==
CBS This Morning won a Peabody Award in 2014 for "its timely, meaningful look into the face and mind of a tyrant" in the feature story "One-on-One with Assad".

=== Ratings ===
Upon the show's launch, CBS executives said that they expected it would take years for a ratings turnaround in the morning time period. The program debuted to an average of 2.72 million viewers (1.11 million in the key demographic of adults 25 to 54 years old) in its first week; its total viewership was 10% lower than The Early Show's during the same week in the previous year. As of August 2015, CBS This Morning continued to show the most growth, up to 12 percent in viewers and up to 14 percent in the A25-54 demo vs. the same week in 2014, with 3.196 million viewers.

In November 2016, CBS This Morning came within striking distance of Today and scored the best November sweeps month for a CBS morning show in 23 years, averaging 2.8 million viewers - only 800,000 viewers behind "Today".
