= Adriana Diaz (journalist) =

American model and journalist

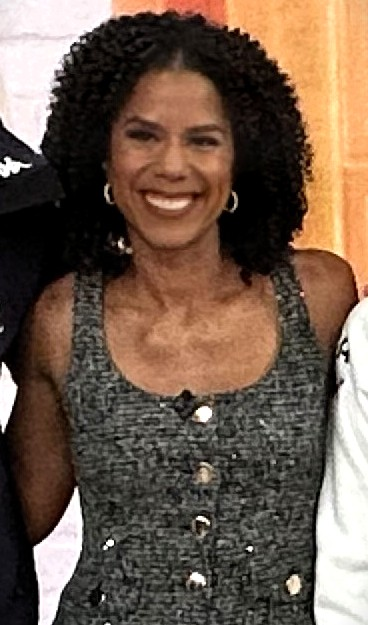
- Diaz in 2025
- Born: Adriana Sabrina Diaz; November 29, 1984 (age 41); New York City, U.S.
- Education: Stuyvesant High School; Princeton University (BA); Columbia University
- Occupation: Television reporter
- Years active: 2003–present
- Employer: CBS News
- Notable work: CBS Weekend News Saturday (2020–2024); CBS Mornings Plus (2024–2025); CBS Saturday Morning (2026–present)
- Spouse: Bryan Smith (m. 2020)
- Children: 2
- Website: facebook.com/adrianadiaznews

Adriana Sabrina Diaz (born November 29, 1984, New York City) is an American television journalist for CBS News. She is currently the co-host of CBS Saturday Morning and co-anchor of CBS News 24/7 Mornings.

== Early life ==
Born to Dominican immigrants, Diaz won the title of Miss New York Teen USA 2003 at the age of 17 . She competed at Miss Teen USA 2003, held in Palm Springs, California. That pageant was won by Tami Farrell. Diaz won the Miss New York USA 2006 title in a state pageant held in late 2005.

She competed for the title of Miss USA in Baltimore, Maryland on April 21, 2006. The pageant was won by Miss Kentucky, Tara Conner. Diaz attended Stuyvesant High School in NYC. She has a BA degree from Princeton University, majoring in public and international affairs, and a master's degree in Public Affairs and Public Administration from Columbia University. Before getting her masters, she worked at Goldman Sachs.

== Career ==
Diaz worked for Channel One News, a youth-oriented news program. She also was a financial analyst at Goldman Sachs.

From 2016 to 2017, Diaz, who speaks Mandarin, was the Beijing-based Asia correspondent for CBS News. She returned to the United States and became a CBS News national correspondent based in Chicago, occasionally filling in on WBBM-TV on a freelance basis, and has worked as a digital journalist for CBSN. She also served as the anchor of the Saturday edition of CBS Weekend News until 2024.

From September 30, 2024, until October 2025, Diaz served as co-anchor of CBS Mornings Plus, a third hour of that show which mainly aired on the network's streaming channels and aired on some CBS stations. The program was cancelled due to cuts caused by the merger that created Paramount Skydance.

In January 2026, Diaz began serving as the co-host of CBS Saturday Morning and co-anchor of CBS News 24/7 Mornings of along with Kelly O'Grady, joining Vladimir Duthiers for the latter.

== Personal life ==
In 2020, she married cardiologist Bryan Smith at St. Mary of the Angels Church in Chicago.

Awards and achievements
Preceded by Meaghan Jarensky	Miss New York USA; 2006	Succeeded by Gloria Almonte
Preceded by Marley Delduchetto	Miss New York Teen USA; 2003	Succeeded by Catherine Muldoon
