= CBS Saturday Morning =

American Saturday morning television program

- Also known as: CBS News Saturday Morning (1997–1999); The Saturday Early Show (1999–2012); CBS This Morning Saturday (2012–2021); CBS Saturday Morning (2021–present)
- Genre: News program
- Directed by: Kelly Casse
- Presented by: Adriana Diaz; Kelly O'Grady
- Theme music composer: Gottfried Reiche & Antfood
- Opening theme: "Abblasen" with CBS' five note jingle by Antfood
- Country of origin: United States
- Original language: English

Production
- Executive producer: Brian Applegate
- Camera setup: Multi-camera
- Running time: 84 minutes
- Production company: CBS News

Original release
- Network: CBS
- Release: September 13, 1997 – present

CBS Saturday Morning is a Saturday morning television program that broadcasts on the American television network, CBS. It is the Saturday counterpart to the network's weekday morning program, CBS Mornings.

Although the program's name has changed several times throughout its existence to align with changes to its weekday counterpart, its format has evolved separately from, and more gradually compared to CBS' weekday morning programs.

== Scheduling ==
The program airs live from 7:00 a.m. to 9:00 a.m. Eastern Time, although local air times for the Saturday broadcast vary significantly from station to station, even within the same time zone.

Most CBS affiliates in the Central Time Zone carry the Saturday edition live from 6:00 a.m. to 8:00 a.m. Central Time, unlike its morning counterparts, which air their Saturday editions on a tape delay; it is the only morning program that airs live in both the Eastern and Central time zones, whereas the Saturday edition is aired on tape delay in the remaining time zones.

== History ==
=== CBS News Saturday Morning (1997–1999) ===
CBS debuted its first Saturday morning newscast on September 13, 1997, alongside the relaunch of its Saturday morning children's programming lineup as Think CBS Kids. Titled CBS News Saturday Morning, the program was originally anchored by Russ Mitchell and former New York congresswoman Susan Molinari, who left in 1998, followed by Dawn Stensland-Mendte in 1998–1999.

For its first year, the program was broadcast live one hour later than the Monday through Friday version of the original CBS This Morning, starting at 8:00 a.m. Eastern Time; however, it was based out of the same studio at the CBS Broadcast Center that was home to the weekday broadcast. The program moved to the 7:00 a.m. Eastern time slot (uniform with the weekday broadcast) in September 1998. Many CBS stations aired CBS News Saturday Morning/The Saturday Early Show in varying time slots; however, some affiliates (such as KENS in San Antonio, Texas, and WREG-TV in Memphis, Tennessee) opted to pre-empt the Saturday edition in favor of airing local morning newscasts, while some chose to carry the network's Saturday morning children's program block afterward if their newscast ended before 9:00 a.m. in order to make up for the pre-emption of the national program, something that remains the case with the current iteration of the program.

By 1999, the program had launched a series of musical performances under the "Second Cup Café" banner (no relationship to the Canada-based Second Cup café chain, which has had some American franchises from time to time), which continued through subsequent versions of the program.

=== The Saturday Early Show (1999–2008) ===
Production of the Saturday edition moved to the General Motors Building in late 1999, when the weekday and Saturday programs were relaunched under The Early Show brand. Russ Mitchell continued as co-host alongside Thalia Assuras (1999–2002), Gretchen Carlson (2002–2005), and Tracy Smith (2005–2007). Jeff Glor and Chris Wragge rotated as co-hosts alongside Maggie Rodriguez in 2007. In 2008, when Rodriguez moved to weekdays, correspondents Betty Nguyen, Kelly Cobiella and Kelly Wallace rotated as co-hosts.

The format allowed for news and weather cut-ins, however not every affiliate provided local updates, usually due to a lack of a staff normally assigned for a weekend (or at least, a Saturday) morning newscast on stations that did not offer local updates. Alternately, an informal conversation segment among the anchors appeared during the time allocated to the cut-ins, and graphical weather information for various U.S. cities during the weather cut-ins on stations that did not provide local updates. Weather anchors Ira Joe Fisher and, initially, Lonnie Quinn, provided voiceovers for some of the forecasts, while chatting with people in the audience outside the studio's building; afterward, the graphics ran only set to music.

=== The Early Show on Saturday (2008–2012) ===
In 2008, The Saturday Early Show began to be branded as simply The Early Show, in line with the weekday edition. Around that time, the program began to be anchored by WCBS-TV anchor Chris Wragge and Erica Hill, running until the weekday shake-up at the end of 2010. On January 8, 2011, Russ Mitchell returned to co-anchor with Rebecca Jarvis while WCBS-TV chief weathercaster Lonnie Quinn continued as weather anchor and CBS Morning News anchor Betty Nguyen served as news anchor, co-anchoring one Saturday a month.

=== CBS This Morning Saturday (2012–2021) ===
The program relaunched as CBS This Morning Saturday on January 14, 2012, after the relaunch of the weekday program as the revived CBS This Morning. Although Russ Mitchell left the program, being replaced by Jeff Glor alongside the continuing Rebecca Jarvis, the Saturday edition did not initially see the same format changes as the weekday program, with Betty Nguyen initially continuing as the program's news anchor, and Lonnie Quinn as weather anchor until late 2012 (and weather segments continuing with substitute hosts until March 2013). Couches were also moved temporarily onto the main set where the hosts would introduce certain segments, while the weekday program's "EyeOpener" was not introduced to the Saturday edition until June 14, 2014.

After Glor was named anchor of the Sunday edition of the CBS Evening News, the program started using various male correspondents, including Anthony Mason, Chip Reid, Jim Axelrod, Maurice DuBois, James Brown, Byron Pitts, Ben Tracy, Charles Osgood, Lee Cowan, Major Garrett, Seth Doane, John Dickerson, John Miller and Tony Dokoupil, rotating every other Saturday. Eventually Mason became the permanent Saturday anchor, initially alongside Jarvis, then Vinita Nair, Alex Wagner, and later both Michelle Miller and Dana Jacobson.

Following a divisional restructuring in May 2019 that resulted in his departure from the CBS Evening News, Glor rejoined CBS This Morning Saturday on June 22, 2019, replacing Mason who had moved to the weekday program. At that point, CBS News executives noted that the program was referred to internally as "SATMO" (as in "Saturday Morning"), possibly a holdover from the earliest iteration of the program.

Like the weekend editions of other network morning shows, the program retained a greater focus on human-interest pieces than on weekdays, though it still concentrates primarily on the news of the day during the first half-hour. It has retained some of the common features of the morning show genre which were removed from the weekday show, though some with an atypical approach, including the aforementioned "Second Cup Café" music feature (later renamed "Saturday Sessions"), which has increasingly focused on independent artists. Cooking segments were eventually replaced by "The Dish", which features profiles of chefs and restaurateurs.

An exception to the usual Saturday format occurred on February 2, 2013 (the day before Super Bowl XLVII), when the weekday anchor team hosted from New Orleans (where the game was held at the Mercedes-Benz Superdome), an edition that was branded as simply CBS This Morning (instead of CBS This Morning Saturday) and was formatted similarly to the weekday program, including "EyeOpener" segments at the top of both hours.

=== CBS Saturday Morning (2021–present) ===
On August 31, 2021, alongside the announcement of a revamped weekday morning program CBS Mornings, CBS announced that the Saturday program would be retitled CBS Saturday Morning, effective September 18. (The September 11 edition, which followed the weekday relaunch on September 7, aired as CBS This Morning Saturday, but was partially pre-empted in most areas by 9/11 memorial coverage.) As with the weekday program, production was relocated to the newly-christened Studio 1515 at ViacomCBS' headquarters, One Astor Plaza in Times Square. Despite the name and studio change, the program otherwise maintains the same format as it had for most of its run as CBS This Morning Saturday, and Glor, Jacobson and Miller remained hosts. Both the rebranded CBS Mornings and CBS Saturday Morning tie in more closely with CBS Sunday Morning, including use of the latter's sun logo and a version of the "Abblasen" trumpet fanfare, alongside CBS' five note mnemonic by Antfood.

Jeff Glor was laid off from CBS News in September 2024, as part of larger cutbacks at Paramount Global; he co-anchored CBS Saturday Morning for the final time on September 28 and was not replaced, leaving Jacobson and Miller as the remaining hosts. As part of an expansion of weather segments on CBS News programs in early 2025, CBS Saturday Morning readded regular weather segments presented by WCBS-TV meteorologist John Elliot. On Saturday, October 4, 2025, the program moved back to Studio 57 in the CBS Broadcast Center in conjunction with the weekday CBS Mornings making the same move.

In October 2025, it was reported that Saturday Morning would be integrated with the staff of the weekday CBS Mornings and be relaunched as part of a larger series of staff cuts by Paramount Skydance, with Miller and Jacobson leaving the program; their final broadcast was on November 22. The program was hosted by rotating anchors including Vladimir Duthiers, Lindsey Reiser, Anthony Mason, Meg Oliver, Adriana Diaz, Kelly O'Grady, and Michael George from November 29, 2025 through January 3, 2026.

On January 9, 2026, Adriana Diaz and Kelly O'Grady were announced as the new co-hosts of Saturday Morning. The new anchor duo debuted on January 10, 2026.

== On-air staff ==
=== Current anchors ===
- Adriana Diaz (2026–present)
- Kelly O'Grady (2026–present)

=== Former on-air staff ===
==== Anchors ====
- Russ Mitchell (1997–2006 and 2011)
- Susan Molinari (1997–1998)
- Dawn Stensland-Mendte (1998–1999)
- Thalia Assuras (1999–2002)
- Gretchen Carlson (2002–2005)
- Tracy Smith (2005–2007)
- Maggie Rodriguez (2007–2008)
- Chris Wragge (2007 and 2008–2010)
- Betty Nguyen (2008)
- Kelly Wallace (2008)
- Kelly Cobiella (2008)
- Erica Hill (2008–2010)
- Rebecca Jarvis (2010 and 2011–2013)
- Anthony Mason (2012–2019)
- Vinita Nair (2013–2016)
- Alex Wagner (2016–2018)
- Jeff Glor (2007, 2012, 2019–2024)
- Michelle Miller (2018–2025)
- Dana Jacobson (2018–2025)

==== News anchors ====
Various substitute news anchors were used for the Saturday editions from 2005 to 2009.

- Tracy Smith (2002–2005)
- Jeff Glor (2009–2010)
- Betty Nguyen (2010 and 2011–2012)

==== Weather anchors ====
- Ira Joe Fisher (1999–2006)
- Lonnie Quinn (2006–2012)
