= CBS Broadcast Center =

Television studios in Manhattan, New York

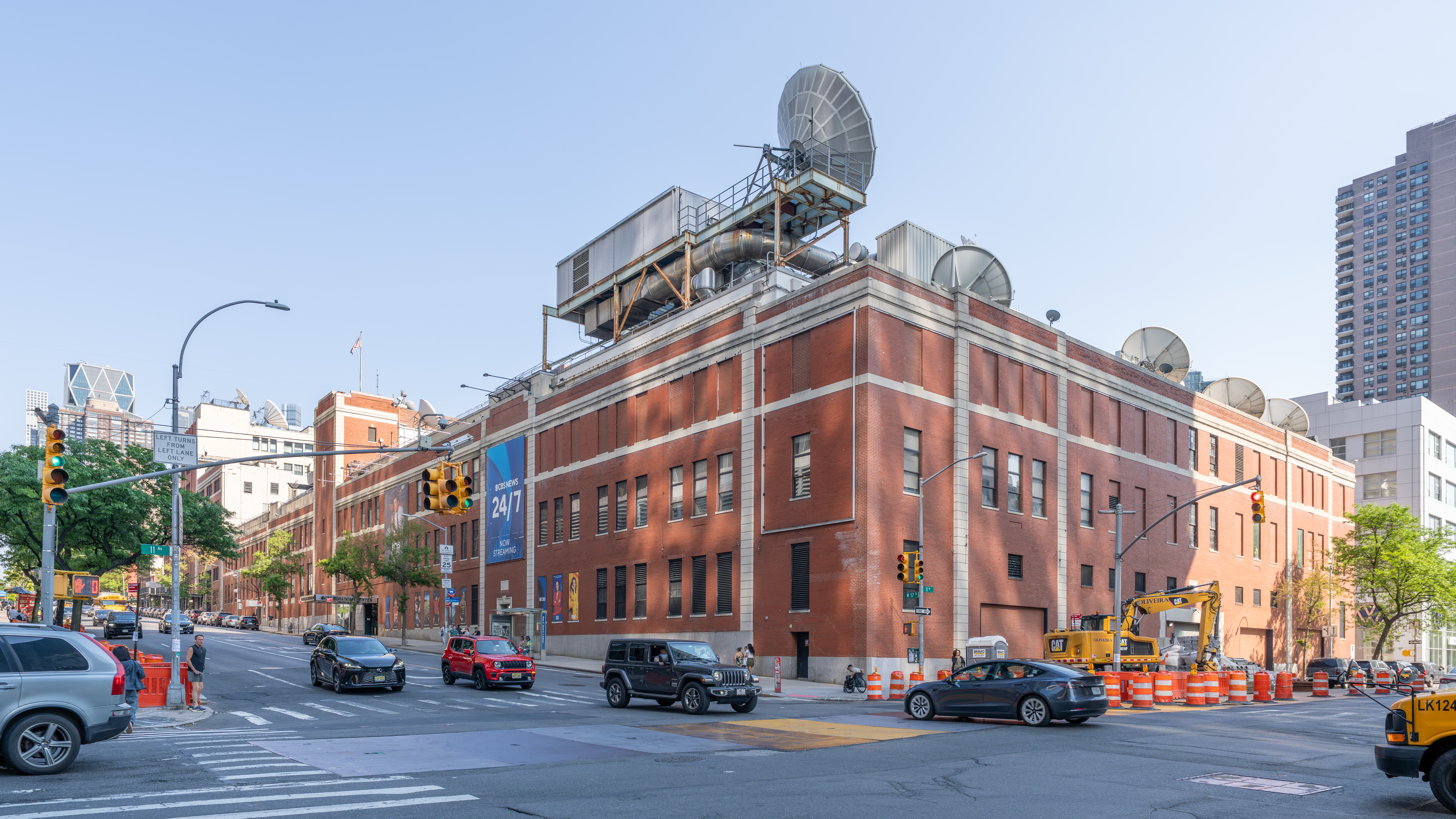
- The broadcast center at 524 West 57th Street (2026)

General information
- Type: Television studios
- Location: Hell's Kitchen; 57th Street, 570 West 57th Street, New York City, New York, United States
- Coordinates: 40°46′09.5″N 73°59′22.4″W
- Current tenants: CBS News; CBS Sports; WCBS-TV; WLNY-TV
- Construction started: 1952
- Completed: 1952
- Inaugurated: July 26, 1964
- Cost: US$1,000,000,000
- Owner: Skydance Corporation

Height
- Height: 123 m (404 ft)

Technical details
- Floor count: 38
- Floor area: 80,000 m^{2} (860,000 sq ft)
- Lifts/elevators: 16

Design and construction
- Architect: Eero Saarinen
- Architecture firm: William Lescaze and Earl T. Heitschmidt

Other information
- Public transit: 59th Street–Columbus Circle station

Website
- cbsbroadcastcenter.com

The CBS Broadcast Center is a television and radio production facility located on the West Side of Midtown Manhattan in New York City. It is CBS's main East Coast production hub, similar to CBS Studio Center in Los Angeles as the West Coast hub. The Broadcast Center is one of two production facilities in Manhattan utilized by Skydance Corporation. The other is the Ed Sullivan Theater, which hosted The Late Show with Stephen Colbert.

== Description ==
The nearly block-long facility at 524 West 57th Street in the Hell's Kitchen section of Manhattan serves as the headquarters of CBS News and its live streaming news channel, and is the main broadcast facility for CBS News, CBS Sports, New York City flagship O&O station WCBS-TV and CBS-owned independent station WLNY. In 2001, BET previously used studios for 106 & Park and other in-studio shows (both BET and CBS were part of Viacom until their 2006 separation by the Viacom/CBS split, later re-merged in 2019). CBS Media Ventures's nationally syndicated newsmagazine Inside Edition is also produced at the Broadcast Center.

The Broadcast Center was also the production base for CBS News Radio. The network's Master Control (aka Central Control) on the first floor also serves as the routing center for other programming distributed by Westwood One (formerly Dial Global). The radio network's flagship station WCBS (AM) was housed in the Broadcast Center from 2000 (moving from Black Rock, CBS's corporate headquarters at 51 West 52nd Street) until 2011 when it relocated to 345 Hudson Street in lower Manhattan, billed on-air as "The Audacy Hudson Square Broadcast Center."

In addition to the Broadcast Center, CBS has one other major studio in Manhattan — the Ed Sullivan Theater (CBS-TV Studio 50) at 1697 Broadway, the former home of The Late Show with Stephen Colbert. The General Motors Building (CBS-TV Studio 58), on Fifth Avenue and 58th Street, was the home of The Early Show until December 31, 2011. The Early Show's successor, the second incarnation of CBS This Morning (predecessor of CBS Mornings), premiered from newly constructed Studio 57 at the Broadcast Center on January 9, 2012.

The CBS Evening News moved into Studio 57 from Studio 47 (previously sharing space with the CBS News newsroom) in December 2016. From December 2019 to January 2025 CBS Evening News broadcast out of Washington, D.C., moving back to the broadcast center in 2025. ViacomCBS announced in May 2021 that CBS This Morning would vacate the Broadcast Center for the MTV Studios. The move was completed on September 7, 2021, when CBS This Morning rebranded to CBS Mornings. On September 29, 2025, CBS Mornings moved back to the CBS Broadcast Center from Times Square studio.

== History ==
=== Early history ===
The building in which the Broadcast Center is located formerly served as a dairy depot for Sheffield Farms. CBS purchased the site in 1952. The Center opened as the CBS Production Center in the late 1950s, when the network's master control, film and videotape facilities, and four studios were located in the Grand Central Terminal building.

CBS began using the 57th Street facility regularly for TV in 1963. The radio network, with offices at 1 East 53rd Street and studios at 49 East 52nd Street, near the old CBS corporate headquarters at 485 Madison Avenue, moved to the Broadcast Center in July 1964, while the television network's master control moved from Grand Central to the Broadcast Center in late 1964. The company spent $14.5 million to create what was, at the time, "the largest 'self-contained' radio and television production center in the United States and the most modern broadcasting plant of its kind in the world," as the New York Tribune put it in 1961.

From the 1950s to 1970s, another prominent CBS stage in New York was Studio 52 (now the disco-theater Studio 54) at 254 West 54th Street, around the corner from Studio 50. CBS also leased the Himan Brown studios at 221 West 26th Street, now Chelsea Studios, for several shows in the 1960s, 1970s, and 1980s.

=== CBS Broadcast Center and soap operas ===
Until January 2000, the Broadcast Center was home to CBS-TV's soap opera As the World Turns, which moved to JC Studios in Brooklyn. Former serials Love of Life, Search for Tomorrow, before moving to NBC in March of 1982 and The Edge Of Night before moving to ABC in December of 1975 Love is a Many Splendored Thing, Secret Storm, and Where the Heart Is were also produced at the Broadcast Center.

After a 37-year absence, Guiding Light returned to the Broadcast Center in September 2005, after 17 years at EUE/Screen Gems studios, 222 East 44th Street and 20 years at the CBS/Himan Brown studios at 221 West 26th Street. The show had been produced in Studio 45 at the CBS Broadcast Center from 1965 to 1968 before moving to West 26th Street. GL used Studios 42 and 45 until its final broadcast on September 18, 2009.

=== "From the ABC Broadcast Center..." ===
In 1996, Brillstein-Grey Entertainment produced The Dana Carvey Show at the Broadcast Center for ABC. As a jab at CBS (ABC's competition), the show's opening credits had a man with a paper version of the ABC logo on a ladder outside of the Broadcast Center covering over the CBS Eye logo while the announcer proclaimed "From the ABC Broadcast Center...".

=== Recent history ===
In early 2012, it was announced The Nate Berkus Show would not be renewed. After a few months it was announced that Anderson Cooper's talk show would move into Studio 42 leaving its home in the Time Warner Center.

Also in 2012, CBS acquired the Riverhead, Long Island-licensed WLNY-TV (Channel 55, cable channel 10), setting up a duopoly with WCBS-TV. Following the merger, CBS moved that station's employees to the CBS Broadcast Center. Their former Melville facility was maintained as the WCBS/WLNY Long Island bureau offices until 2020 when it was taken over by an independent production company. WLNY currently carries one program from Broadcast Center: a 9pm newscast with WCBS's news personnel from Broadcast Center. Live from the Couch, a morning show airing parallel to CBS This Morning on WCBS, was broadcast on WLNY from 2012 until early 2014, when it was canceled due to low ratings.

HBO satire show Last Week Tonight with John Oliver, Showtime talk show Desus & Mero are also recorded at the Broadcast Center. TBS news satire show Full Frontal with Samantha Bee recorded from the Broadcast Center from its 2016 premiere until the pandemic, before moving to home taping for several months. After that, the latter show moved to Connecticut and a smaller studio without an audience.

On March 12, 2020, one day after COVID-19 was declared a pandemic, the CBS Broadcast Center was closed for disinfection after two employees tested positive for COVID-19. Production of WCBS newscasts was assumed by KCBS-TV, while CBS This Morning was moved to CBS News's Washington studio (used for the CBS Evening News since December). The Broadcast Center reopened on a limited basis on March 14, 2020, starting with the Saturday edition of CBS This Morning from Studio 57; on March 18, ViacomCBS announced that its operations would again temporarily relocate from the Broadcast Center, with CBS This Morning moving to the set of The Late Show with Stephen Colbert at the Ed Sullivan Theater and KCBS-TV again producing WCBS-TV's newscasts. From March 20, WCBS-TV newscasts were presented from the studios of New York Yankees and Brooklyn Nets broadcaster YES Network in Stamford, Connecticut, before moving back again to the Broadcast Center, beginning on April 17 with the morning newscast. On the June 21, 2020, broadcast of 60 in 6, Seth Doane partially covered the Broadcast Center's exposure to COVID-19 in a piece titled CBS News Battles COVID-19. The piece mentions that CBS News flew in staffers, including those located in Seattle and Rome in early March 2020 to begin filming promotional material for 60 in 6, which brought COVID-19 positive individuals in close contact with CBS employees which resulted in the shutdown of the CBS Broadcast Center.

=== Potential sale ===
In June 2023, CBS chief George Cheeks told staff that the company was exploring a sale of the building. At the time, the building covered 1,000,000 square feet (93,000 m^{2}) and had large amounts of air rights, which permitted the development of skyscrapers on the site. The Broadcast Center remains one of the last major pieces of CBS real estate still owned by Paramount; the company previously sold the CBS Building (also known as Black Rock), as well as Television City in Los Angeles. By January 2024, CBS was also looking for an investment partner to buy a minority stake in the CBS Broadcast Center. CBS still had not found a buyer or partner as of September 2024.

== Studios ==
- 29: Inside Edition
- 33: 60 Minutes
- 41: The Drew Barrymore Show, former home of the CBS Evening News With Walter Cronkite
- 42: Last Week Tonight with John Oliver, also used as the 2024 vice presidential debate spin room
- 43: CBS Sports, CBS Sports Network
- 44: CBS Sports Network
- 45: CBS Sports (mostly Paramount+), CBS Sunday Morning (for special editions), former home of Inside Edition, stage for the 2024 vice presidential debate
- 46: CBS News New York
- 47: CBS News Mornings / CBS Morning News on CBS News 24/7 / CBS News 24/7 Mornings / CBS Evening News / CBS Weekend News
- 55: CBS News New York AR/VR weather
- 57: CBS Mornings / CBS Saturday Morning / CBS News Roundup / CBS News 24/7
