= Jeff Glor =

American journalist (born 1975)

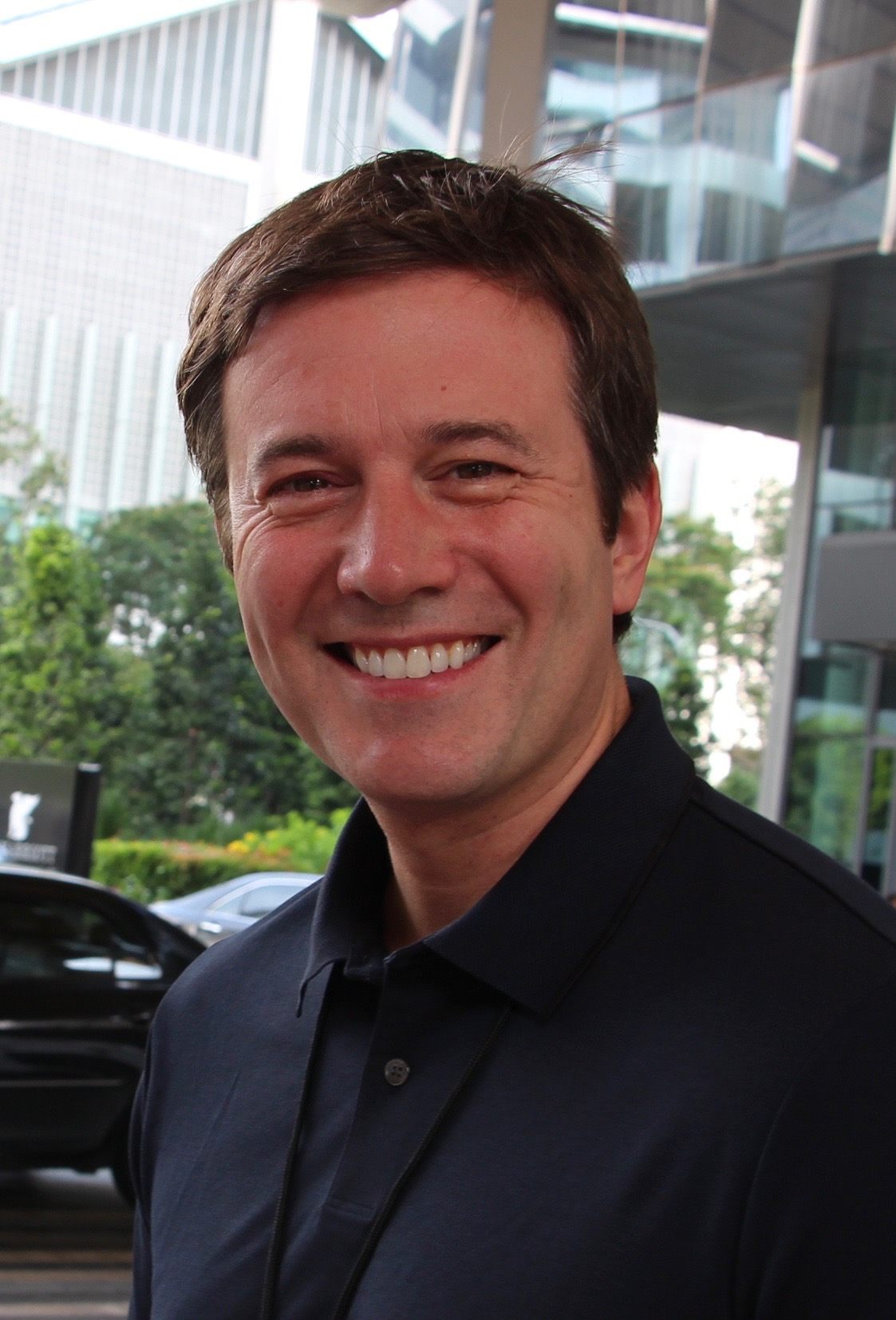
- Glor in 2018
- Born: Jeffrey Todd Glor; July 12, 1975 (age 50); Buffalo, New York, U.S.
- Education: Kenmore East High School; Syracuse University
- Occupations: Journalist; correspondent; news anchor
- Years active: 1997–present
- Employer(s): WSTM-TV (1997–2003); WHDH (2003–2007); CBS News (2007–2024)
- Spouse: Nicole Glab (m. 2003)
- Children: 2

Jeffrey Todd Glor (born July 12, 1975) is an American journalist who most recently was a co-host of CBS Saturday Morning from 2019 to 2024 and a CBS News special correspondent. He had also anchored the CBS Evening News from 2017 to 2019.

== Early life and education ==
Glor was born in Buffalo, New York, where he attended Kenmore East High School, a public high school in his hometown of Tonawanda, New York. He graduated from Syracuse University in 1997 with dual degrees in journalism (from the S.I. Newhouse School of Public Communications) and economics. At Syracuse, he was awarded the Henry J. Wolff prize, given to the Newhouse student "most proficient in journalism.”

He is one of three sons born to Bruce and Karen Glor. He has two brothers, David and Richard. Richard Glor is an expert on lizard evolution and is the Curator of Herpetology at the University of Kansas Biodiversity Institute and Museum of Natural History.

== Life and career ==
Glor was co-anchor of WSTM-TV Syracuse's 5 p.m. newscast and a reporter for the 11 p.m. newscast (2000–2003). He was the morning news anchor from 1997 to 2000. He joined WSTM as a part-time producer while still attending college. Glor was named "Best Male News Anchor" by Syracuse New Times and one of the 40 most promising professionals under the age of 40. Glor was a contributing researcher and writer on The Legal Handbook for N.Y. State Journalists. He served as weekend evening news anchor and weekday reporter for WHDH in Boston from 2003 to 2007.

He joined CBS News in 2007 as co-anchor, and later newsreader, on the Saturday Early Show. He also reported primarily for the weekday version of The Early Show, including an extended period in Iraq, China, and on the presidential campaign in 2008. From 2008 rotating with Russ Mitchell and from 2009 to 2010, he anchored the CBS Saturday Evening News, Glor's name was not added to Saturday intro until 2009. Also in 2009, he began to report for other broadcasts, including the CBS Evening News and CBS Sunday Morning, for which he won an Emmy.

He served as news anchor for The Early Show from January 2011 to January 2012. Following that in 2012, he anchored the Saturday edition of the newly launched CBS This Morning, the successor to The Early Show, and also began to focus reporting on long-form stories as a correspondent for CBS This Morning. From 2012 to 2016, he anchored the CBS Sunday Evening News, and from 2013 to 2014, he was the correspondent on extended investigations for the CBS Evening News, including recalls at General Motors and Takata. In 2015 and 2016, he contributed a wide range of stories to 60 Minutes Sports. He also began filling in for Charlie Rose on his eponymous show on PBS.

On October 25, 2017, CBS announced that Glor would become the new permanent anchor for the CBS Evening News in late 2017, replacing Scott Pelley, who left the position in June 2017. (Anthony Mason had been anchoring the program on an interim basis after Pelley's departure.) Glor became the new permanent weekday anchor of the CBS Evening News on December 4, 2017.

In December 2017, Glor interviewed French President Emmanuel Macron at the One Planet Summit in Paris, following Donald Trump's decision to pull the U.S. out of the 2015 Paris Accords. That night he broadcast the Evening News live from the Élysée Palace, a first for any American network.

On May 29, 2018, the CBS Evening News with Jeff Glor revived the in-depth segment "Eye on America", first launched by CBS News in 1991. Produced by domestic news bureaus, the immersive reports focus on key issues such as the role of teachers in the age of mass shootings, sanctuary cities, opioid addiction, and more.

On May 6, 2019, CBS News president Susan Zirinsky announced that, by the summer, Norah O'Donnell was appointed as the new anchor and managing editor of the CBS Evening News. Zirinsky also stated they were "discussing opportunities" for Glor to remain at CBS News. His last broadcast of the CBS Evening News aired on May 10, 2019, whereupon he wished O'Donnell "the best of luck" and paid tribute to the behind-the-scenes team by running full staff credits. A rotating series of anchors substituted during the interim.

On June 22, 2019, Glor joined Dana Jacobson and Michelle Miller as co-host of CBS This Morning: Saturday, later retitled CBS Saturday Morning. He also served as a special news correspondent, reporting featured stories and doing investigative work.

On September 28, 2024, Glor left CBS News, amid Paramount layoffs.

== Personal life ==
A fan of the Buffalo Bills, on August 30, 2011 he interviewed the former Bills head coach Marv Levy on The Early Show.

Glor and his wife, Nicole (née Glab), a fitness instructor and former college cheerleader, whom he met at Syracuse University, live in Greenwich, Connecticut and have two children: a son and a daughter.

== See also ==
- New Yorkers in journalism

Media offices
Preceded by Scott Pelley	CBS Evening News Weekday Edition Anchor; December 4, 2017 – May 10, 2019	Succeeded by Norah O'Donnell
