= Tracy Smith (journalist) =

American journalist

- Born: Tracy Elizabeth Smith; November 7, 1968 (age 57); Wyoming, Ohio, U.S.
- Education: Boston University (BS); University of Southern California (MA)
- Occupation: Journalist
- Years active: 1993–present
- Employer: CBS News
- Notable work: CBS News Sunday Morning; 48 Hours
- Spouse: John D'Amelio (m. 1993)
- Children: 2

Tracy Elizabeth Smith (born November 7, 1968) is a CBS news correspondent for CBS News Sunday Morning and 48 Hours. Smith is a former Channel One News anchor and correspondent.

== Early life and education ==
Smith was born in Wyoming, Ohio. She graduated cum laude with a Bachelor of Science degree from Boston University's College of Communication in 1990. She then earned a master's degree in broadcast journalism from the University of Southern California in 1993.

== Career ==
In 2000, Smith joined CBS News covering national and international news events. She was a national correspondent for The Early Show and co-anchored the The Saturday Early Show as well as reporting for the CBS Evening News. Subsequently, she became a CBS news correspondent for CBS News Sunday Morning and 48 Hours. Prior to CBS, Smith was employed as a reporter by KERO-TV, and was a Channel One News anchor and correspondent.

In April 2015, a Wilbur Award for the best "Television & Cable News: Network or national syndication" was awarded to Smith as correspondent; her husband, John D'Amelio, as producer; and Lauren Barnello, as producer/editor for the CBS Sunday Morning show "Heavenly Voices."

== Personal life ==
In August 1993, Smith married CBS News Sunday Morning producer John D'Amelio, with whom she has two children.
