= Scott Pelley =

American journalist and author (born 1957)

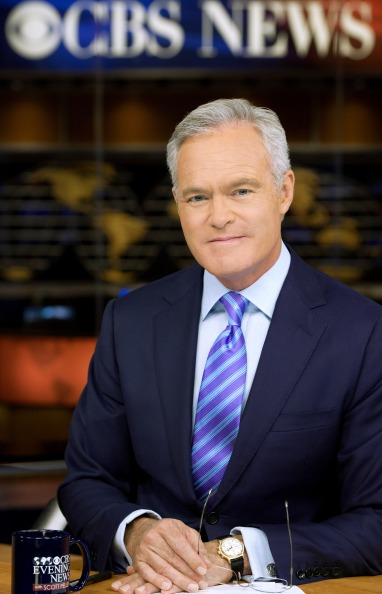
- Pelley in 2014
- Born: Scott Cameron Pelley; July 28, 1957 (age 69); San Antonio, Texas, U.S.
- Education: Texas Tech University (attended)
- Occupation: Journalist
- Years active: 1975–present
- Notable credits: 60 Minutes; CBS Evening News
- Spouse: Jane Boone (m. 1983)
- Children: 2

Scott Cameron Pelley (born July 28, 1957) is an American author and broadcast journalist. Pelley is the author of the 2019 book, Truth Worth Telling, and a former correspondent for the CBS News magazine 60 Minutes. Pelley served as anchor and managing editor of the CBS Evening News from 2011 to 2017, a period in which the broadcast added viewers. Pelley served as CBS News's chief White House correspondent from 1997 to 1999.

Beginning his broadcast news career at local stations in Texas, Pelley worked for CBS News in New York for 37 years. During his career, he received numerous awards for excellence in journalism.

== Early life and education ==
Born in San Antonio, Texas, Pelley grew up in Lubbock, where he graduated from Coronado High School and obtained his first job in journalism at the age of 15 as a copyboy for the Lubbock Avalanche-Journal. Staying close to home, he majored in journalism at Texas Tech University in Lubbock, though he left school a few credit hours short of completing his degree.

== Career ==
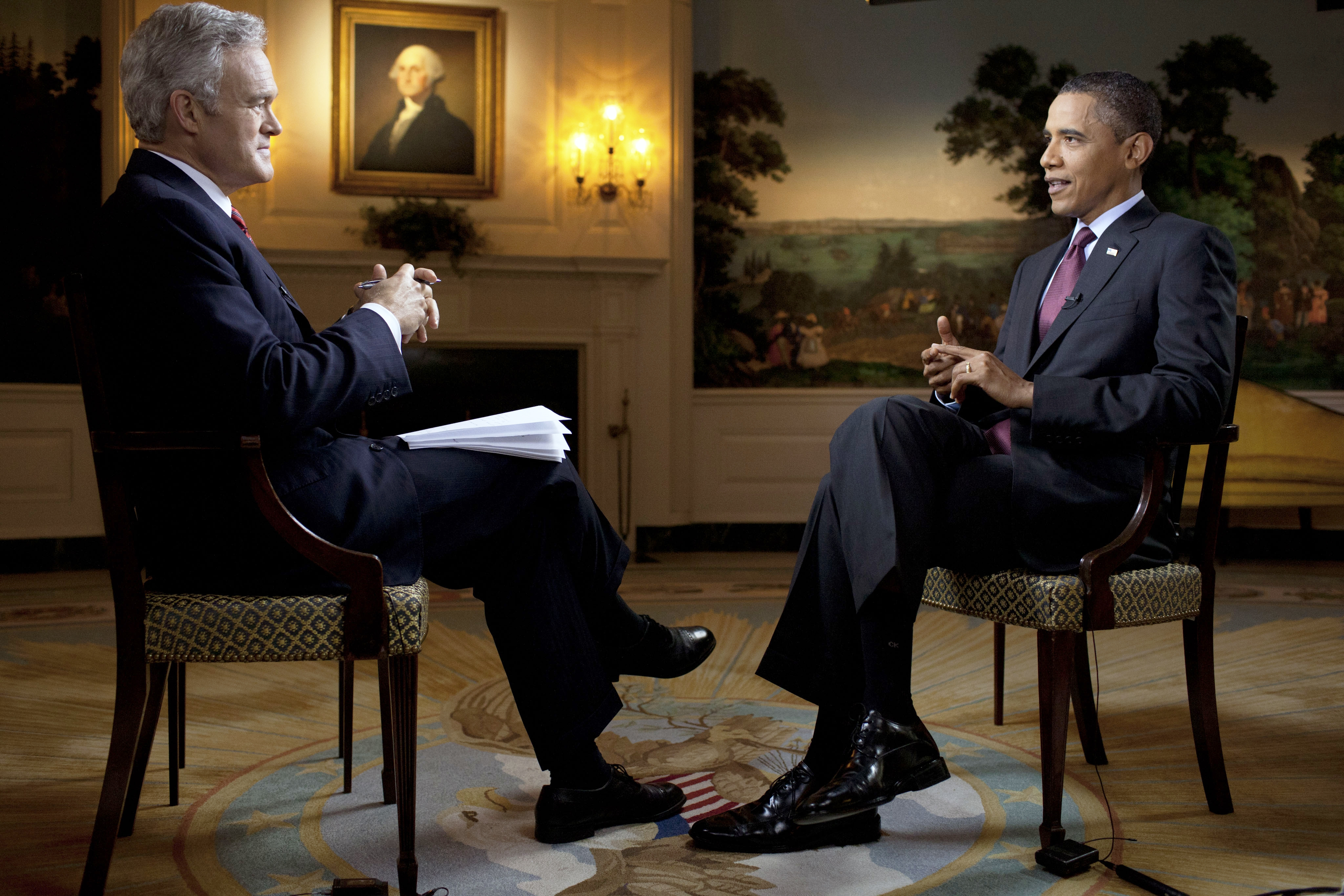
Pelley interviewing President Barack Obama, 2011

=== Early career ===
From 1975 to 1978 he worked for KSEL-TV in Lubbock. From 1978 to 1981 he worked for KXAS-TV in Dallas. From 1982 to 1989 he was a producer/reporter for WFAA-TV in Dallas.

=== CBS News ===
Pelley's CBS career started in New York City in 1989. Later, he returned to Dallas to cover national affairs from the CBS bureau. Pelley covered the 1990/91 Gulf war, reporting from Baghdad and traveling with the XVIII Airborne Corps in its assault on Iraq and Kuwait. He was assigned to cover the 1992 presidential campaigns of Ross Perot and Bill Clinton, and also reported on such major events as the 1993 World Trade Center bombing, the Waco siege, and the Oklahoma City bombing.

Pelley served as CBS News's Chief White House Correspondent from 1997 to 1999. During that time, President Clinton was impeached by the United States House of Representatives. In covering the investigation of the president, Pelley broke the news that Monica Lewinsky had become a cooperating witness in the investigation conducted by the Office of Independent Counsel.

=== 60 Minutes and 60 Minutes II ===
Pelley reported on the economic collapse of 2008-09, on the wars in Afghanistan and Iraq, and on climate change from Antarctica and the Arctic. In 2009, Pelley conducted an interview with Federal Reserve Chairman Ben Bernanke. The interview was the first with a Fed Chairman in decades and broke a long-standing Federal Reserve tradition.

Pelley has reported from Iraq on the front lines in the battle against ISIS; he landed the first major television interview with FBI Director James Comey in 2014; and he conducted an interview of the nurses who treated the first Ebola patient in the United States. Pelley also conducted the only interview with one of the Navy SEALs who helped to kill Osama bin Laden.

In September 2015, Pelley met Pope Francis at the Vatican ahead of the pontiff's visit to the United States, and later led CBS News' coverage of the visit.

On October 15, 2023, Pelley conducted an interview with US President Joe Biden about the October 7 attacks and the ongoing Gaza war.

On April 27, 2025, in the Last Minute segment of 60 Minutes, Pelley offered a tribute to Bill Owens, the show's executive producer prior to his resignation, saying that stories the show has presented since its creation have been controversial, such as those about the Gaza war and the Trump administration, most recently. Pelley stated that Paramount (CBS's parent company) had "tried to complete a merger," and that they had begun supervising the show's content, which none of the show's staff supported, while acknowledging that they had not blocked any of their stories. He concluded by saying that Owens felt he "lost independence that honest journalism requires" after Paramount's recent corporate decisions, and said that Owens proved to be the "right person" leading the show "all along." His remarks were described by Variety as a "rare instance" of the show's staff "criticizing the parent company's management of the newsmagazine".

=== War reporting ===
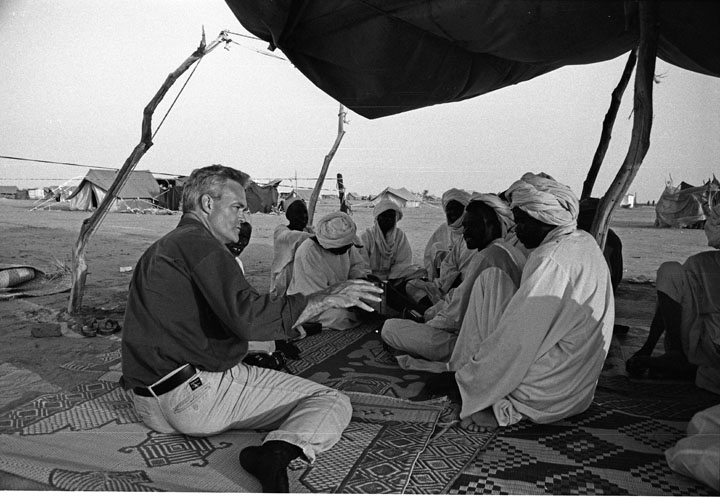
Pelley with Darfur refugees, 2006

Starting with the Persian Gulf crisis of 1990 and the 1991 invasion of Iraq, Pelley has reported extensively from many war zones.

In 2006 and 2007, he filed reports on the genocide in the Darfur region of Sudan. In his 2007 report, Pelley enlisted the help of a rebel group to organize an armed reconnaissance into Darfur. The story revealed a village that had been destroyed by government forces in their campaign of genocide.

In Afghanistan, Pelley accompanied numerous units of the U.S. Army and Marine Corps in combat operations and reported independently on the effects of the war on civilians.

Pelley entered Kyiv to interview President of Ukraine Volodymyr Zelenskyy for the 60 Minutes segment which aired April 10, 2022, while Kyiv was under siege by Russian forces during the 2022 Russian invasion of Ukraine.

=== CBS Evening News ===
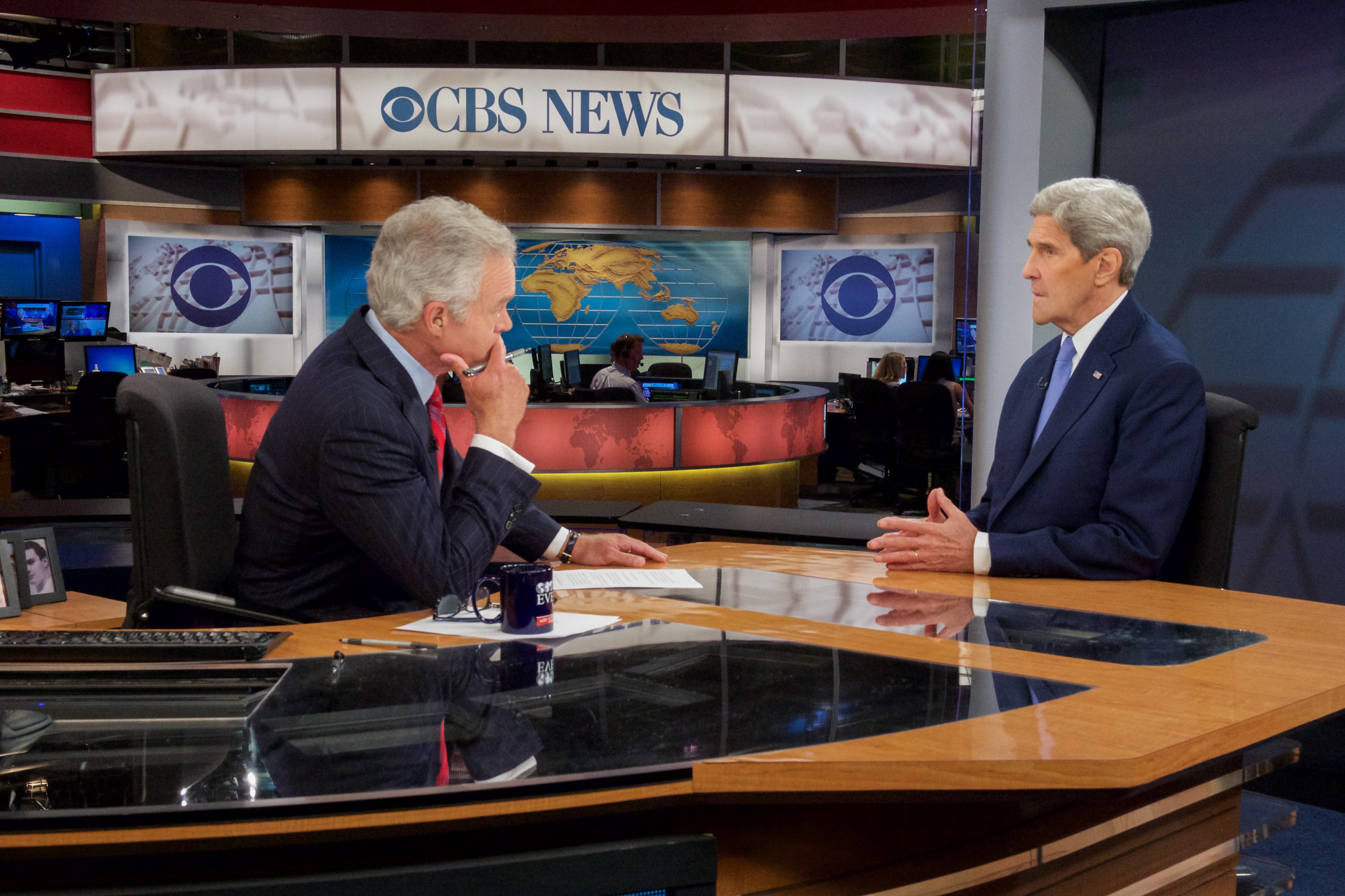
Pelley interviews Secretary of State John Kerry in 2015

Pelley became the anchor of the CBS Evening News on June 6, 2011, succeeding Katie Couric. In Pelley's first nine months in the anchor chair, the program gained an additional daily 821,000 viewers.

According to Washington Post media columnist Margaret Sullivan, Pelley's coverage of the Trump administration was an example of "pointed truth telling" that "set himself apart" from his competitors. Media critic Andrew Tyndall said, "To me, it's not commentary. It's actual reporting."

Pelley later told CNN that he had been removed from the anchor chair in 2017 for complaining to CBS News management about a hostile work environment for the news division's employees. The comments underscored the fallout the network continued to face from the Me Too movement, as CBS Corporation chairman Les Moonves, 60 Minutes executive producer Jeff Fager and CBS This Morning host Charlie Rose were all dismissed for inappropriate conduct on the job.

Despite some articles blaming poor ratings when Pelley was relieved of his position, there were several other articles indicating strong ratings and audience growth during Pelley's tenure as CBS Evening News anchor. These tended to give credence to Pelley's assertion that he was let go due to his complaints about a "hostile work environment".

=== Firing from CBS ===
On June 2, 2026, Pelley was fired by CBS News, following his strong criticism of CBS News editor-in-chief Bari Weiss and newly-named 60 Minutes executive producer Nick Bilton during a contentious staff meeting. Relations between Pelley and Weiss had been tense for months, long before Bilton took the helm in late May 2026. During the meeting, Pelley had accused Weiss of "murdering" the show, and told Bilton that he would "never be welcome" there.

When CBS fired Pelley, Bilton wrote a cover letter, which was obtained by The New York Times. Bilton stated as follows: "Your antipathy to the future of the show has come through loud and clear. And I have heard you. I therefore write on behalf of CBS News, Inc. ('CBS') to inform you that your employment with CBS is terminated for cause effective immediately." The next day, Weiss said, "I'm only interested in working in a newsroom that is built on trust and mutual respect." That night on the CBS Evening News, anchor Tony Dokoupil described Pelley as a "journalist who valued truth at all costs".

In response, Pelley issued a statement accusing the new CBS leadership of instructing him to insert falsehoods into a political story, and to include assertions that were not verified – instructions he says he ignored. "The collapse of values at the top has become untenable. The leadership of 60 Minutes is no longer recognizable. The principles I hold dear are gone, and so I must leave as well," Pelley wrote. In a later interview with the New York Times, Pelley clarified that the story CBS management intervened in was a report about the 2026 ICE protests in Minnesota, and that the falsehood CBS had asked for was to describe protester Renée Good as driving her car toward the officer who killed her, which Pelley said contradicts video evidence of the event.

== Appraisals ==
Variety wrote, "For CBS the key was switching to Pelley, the former war reporter and White House correspondent. He took over from Katie Couric and has steadily made up ground ever since." Of 60 Minutes, David Zurawik of The Baltimore Sun wrote in 2007, "If there is a single face of the broadcast, it is now that of Pelley who has done several of the biggest interviews and stories." Allen Neuharth, founder of USA Today, noted that "Pelley threw hardballs" in his 2007 interview with President Bush. Bob Woodward, writing in The Washington Post in 2007, said, "Scott Pelley nailed the crucial question" in his interview with former CIA Director George Tenet. William F. Buckley, Jr., in the National Review, said "Pelley did fine work" in the Tenet piece. Alessandra Stanley of The New York Times wrote, "the strongest on-air personality of the moment belongs to one of the program's blander faces, Scott Pelley." On Pelley's second anniversary as anchor of the CBS Evening News, the Baltimore Sun praised Pelley and his team for delivering an "honest" newscast.

Variety lauded Pelley as anchor of the CBS Evening News, writing that Pelley "conveys the sense of someone with genuine gravitas and a commitment to his craft, while appearing cool and unflappable in breaking-news situations." In February 2015, the Los Angeles Times praised Pelley's "no frills style" and lauded him for being "all about the journalism." Veteran television writer Stephen Battaglio wrote, "While authenticity has become a hot topic in TV news, Pelley has never needed to invent it or try to enhance it."

== Recognition ==
Pelley is the most awarded correspondent in the history of 60 Minutes. He has won 51 national Emmy Awards from the Academy of Television Arts and Sciences, four Alfred I. duPont-Columbia Silver Batons, and three George Foster Peabody Awards. Reporting on child slavery in India earned Pelley and his team at 60 Minutes II the Investigative Reporters and Editors Award in 1999.

=== Texas Tech ===
Pelley left Texas Tech without a degree, but he has maintained an ongoing relationship with the university. Pelley was inducted into the Texas Tech University College of Media and Communication Hall of Fame in 2006. On March 22, 2013, he was named an Outstanding Alumnus of Texas Tech University, the highest honor bestowed by Texas Tech Alumni Association.

=== Peabody Awards ===
The Pelley team's reporting on the deaths of civilians during a Marine engagement in Haditha, Iraq, won the 2007 George Foster Peabody Award.

In 2009, Pelley's team won its second George Foster Peabody Award for a report on the medical relief organization Remote Area Medical (RAM). RAM was created to airdrop doctors and supplies into the developing world, but today it does most of its work setting up free medical clinics for the uninsured in the United States. The Pelley team's reporting on the deaths of civilians during a Marine engagement in Haditha, Iraq, won him and his team the award.

In 2013, Pelley's team of producers, photographers and editors won its third George Foster Peabody Award for an investigation of a fraudulent medical study at Duke University. The report detailed how a star researcher fabricated data in what was thought to be an important breakthrough in cancer treatment.

=== Multiple awards in one year and George Loeb Awards ===
In the same year that Pelley's team had won a Peabody Award, it won the 2009 George Polk Award; the 2009 Gerald Loeb Award for Television Enterprise Business Journalism; and a 2009 Investigative Reporters and Editors Award for an investigation of American recycling companies that secretly ship hazardous waste to China.

Pelley and his team earned the 2012 Gerald Loeb Award for Explanatory business journalism for the story "The Next Housing Shock."

=== Alfred I. du Pont-Columbia University Award (2011–2020) ===
- In 2011, Pelley's team won the Alfred I. du Pont-Columbia University Award for an investigation into the Deepwater Horizon disaster. The story uncovered the troubled history of the Deepwater Horizon drilling rig in the months and days before the 2010 blowout that killed 11 crewmen and unleashed the largest accidental oil spill in history.
- In 2014, CBS News was recognized with the award for its coverage of the mass murder at Sandy Hook Elementary School in Newtown, Connecticut. In their citation the judges wrote, "Scott Pelley's conversation on '60 Minutes' with seven of the families that lost children was remarkable for its courage and candor."
- In 2016, Pelley and his team earned the award again for reporting on a nerve gas attack that occurred in the suburbs of Damascus, Syria, in 2013.
- In 2020, Pelley and his team were again awarded for reporting on the separation of migrant children from their families at the U.S. border.

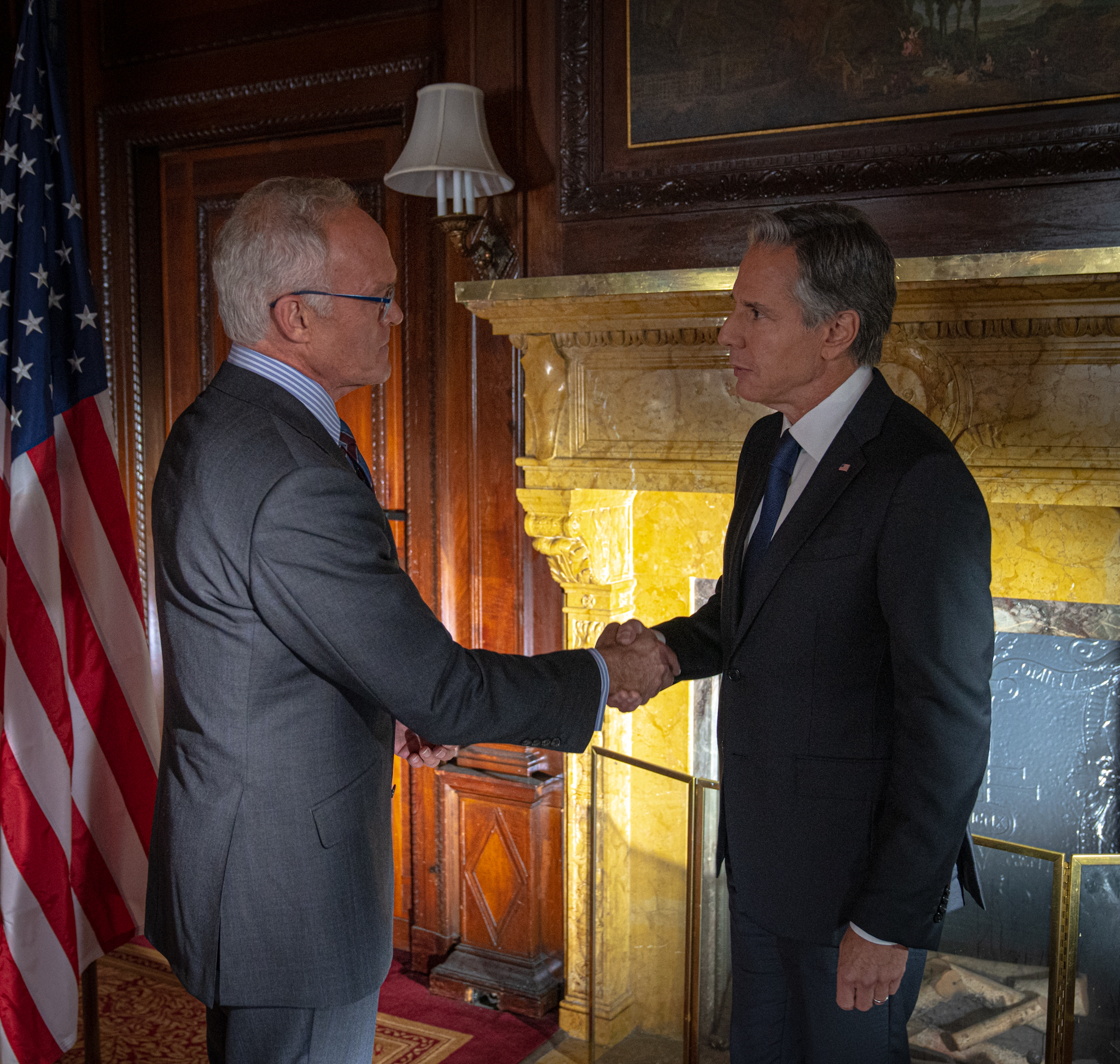
Pelley (left) speaks with US Secretary of State Antony Blinken for 60 Minutes in 2022

=== Edward R. Murrow Award ===
Pelley's team has won multiple Edward R. Murrow Awards bestowed by the Radio-Television News Directors Association, including:

- Two in 2010 for 2009 60 Minutes segments which were Amazon Crude, about pollution caused by Texaco in the Ecuadorian jungle as well the segment on restoration of a marsh in Iraq after they were nearly destroyed by Saddam Hussein titled Resurrecting Eden.
- Three in 2014 for CBS Evening News with Scott Pelley,
- The 2019 Hard News Award for the 60 Minutes segment Mancini's Brain, about new evidence that post-traumatic stress disorder (PTSD) may be caused by physical damage.

In 2016, Pelley was honored with the Walter Cronkite Award for Excellence in Journalism.

The Writers Guild of America awarded Pelley and fellow 60 Minutes writers Nicole Young and Kristin Steve the 2024 News Script Award for the segment titled Healing and Hope, as well as the 2025 award for their segment titled The Resistance

Pelley is a former co-Chair of the Board of Overseers for the International Rescue Committee, the refugee relief agency headquartered in New York City.

== Personal life ==
In 1983, Pelley married Jane Boone, a former television reporter and advertising executive. They have a son and a daughter.

== See also ==
- New Yorkers in journalism

Media offices
| Preceded by Katie Couric | CBS Evening News Weekday Edition Anchor; June 6, 2011 – June 16, 2017 | Succeeded by Jeff Glor |
