= Anthony Mason (journalist) =

American journalist

- Born: Anthony Eliot Mason; June 23, 1956 (age 70); New York City, U.S.
- Education: St. George's School; Georgetown University (BA)
- Occupations: journalist, correspondent, television presenter
- Years active: 1980–present
- Employer(s): CBS News, New York City, U.S.
- Notable work: Senior Culture Correspondent for CBS News; Interim News Anchor, CBS This Morning (weekdays); Co-anchor of CBS This Morning; New York Associated Press Award for General Excellence of Individual Reporting on Vietnam Veterans (1985); Emmy Award for Outstanding Individual Achievement by a Reporter and the Pennsylvania Associated Press Award for Best Feature Story; Correspondent for CBS News since 1986
- Spouse(s): Amy Dickinson (m. 1986; div. 1990) Christina Anne Unhoch (m. 1994)
- Children: 3
- Website: x.com/AnthonyMasonCBS

Anthony Eliot Mason (born June 23, 1956) is an American broadcast journalist. He has worked as a reporter, anchor and correspondent for CBS News since 1986, and was weekday co-host of its flagship morning program CBS This Morning from 2019 until early September 2021. He has also served as an interim anchor for the weekday editions of the CBS Evening News.

== Early life and education ==
Mason was born in New York City and was educated at St. George's School, a boarding school in Middletown, Rhode Island. In 1980, he graduated from Georgetown University with a Bachelor of Arts in English.

== Career ==
=== Early career ===
Mason worked at KJRH-TV in Tulsa, Oklahoma. He then spent two years at then-CBS-owned WCAU-TV in Philadelphia, the start of his association with the network. His last position before joining CBS News was at WCBS-TV in New York City.

=== CBS News and CBS This Morning ===
Mason joined CBS News as a correspondent in 1986. He was the London Bureau correspondent from 1987 to 1990. From 1991 to 1993, Mason was the Chief Moscow Correspondent. He contributed award-winning coverage of the 1991 Soviet coup attempt from Moscow, Russia. He has been working in New York City since 1993. Mason was named the Business Correspondent in 1998. In early 2012, Mason became the co-anchor of CBS This Morning Saturday, and in 2019, became a co-host of the popular CBS This Morning weekday program.

=== CBS Evening News ===
On May 31, 2017, CBS News announced that Mason would become the interim anchor for the weekday editions of the CBS Evening News, replacing Scott Pelley in that role. This was made effective on June 19, 2017. On October 25, CBS News announced that Jeff Glor would become the permanent weekday anchor. Mason's last day as anchor of CBS Evening News was Friday, December 1, 2017, with Glor becoming the new permanent weekday anchor of the program from December 4.

=== CBS Sunday Morning ===
Mason serves as a main correspondent and occasional substitute for CBS Sunday Morning with Jane Pauley. For most of the second half of 2017, he was absent from the broadcast due to his interim anchor position on CBS Evening News.

== Awards ==
In 1985, Mason won the New York Associated Press Award for General Excellence of Individual Reporting on Vietnam Veterans. He won an Emmy Award for Outstanding Individual Achievement by a Reporter, and the Pennsylvania Associated Press Award for Best Feature Story. In 2023, Mason was inducted into the New York Journalism Hall of Fame.

== Personal life ==
Mason is married to Christina Anne Unhoch, and they have three children together.

== See also ==
- New Yorkers in journalism

Media offices
| Preceded by Scott Pelley | CBS Evening News Weekday Edition Anchor; June 19, 2017 – December 1, 2017; Interim | Succeeded by Jeff Glor |
