= Michelle Miller =

American journalist (born 1967)

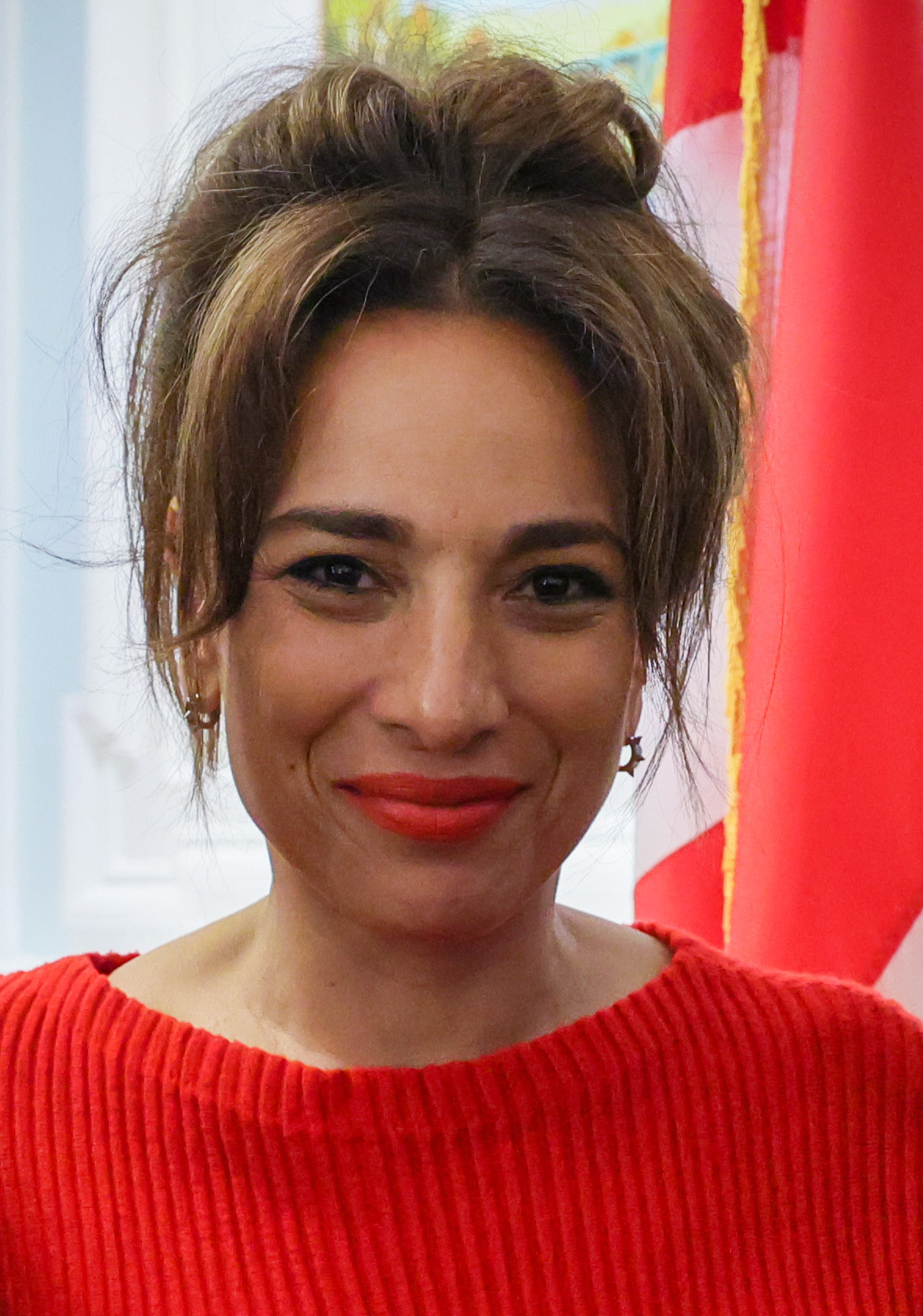
- Miller in 2023
- Born: Michelle Miller; December 8, 1967 (age 58); Los Angeles, California, U.S.
- Education: Howard University (B.A.); University of New Orleans (M.S.)
- Occupation: Journalist
- Years active: 1988–present
- Employer: CBS News (2004–2025)
- Notable work: CBS Mornings; 48 Hours: Live to Tell; CBS Evening News; CBS News Sunday Morning
- Spouse: Marc Morial (m. 1999)
- Children: 3
- Website: cbsnews.com

Michelle Miller (born December 8, 1967) is an American broadcast journalist. Miller served as a national correspondent for CBS News from 2004 to 2025, and is the former co-host of CBS Saturday Morning. She had also served as a substitute anchor on CBS Mornings and 48 Hours on ID.

== Early life ==
Miller was born in Los Angeles, California, United States. She earned a Bachelor of Arts degree in journalism from Howard University and holds a Master of Science degree in urban studies from the University of New Orleans.

== Career ==
In 2004, Miller moved to New York City, where she was hired as the national correspondent and substitute anchor for BET Nightly News before joining CBS News.

In 1988, Miller served as an intern at Nightline and the Minneapolis Star Tribune. From 1989 to 1990, she wrote for the South Bay and Valley editions of the Los Angeles Times. From 1990 to 1993, she worked as an assignment editor, producer and reporter for Orange County Newschannel in Santa Ana, California. From 1993 to 1994, she was a reporter and Weekend Morning anchor at WIS-TV in Columbia, South Carolina.

From 1994 to 2003, Miller lived in New Orleans and worked as a reporter and anchor for WWL-TV, the CBS affiliate. For three of those years, her broadcast "The Early Edition" was the highest rated newscast in its time slot across the Nation. Also, between 1998 and 2001, Miller taught communications and broadcast journalism at Dillard University.

In 2003, Miller had a cameo appearance as a reporter in the movie Runaway Jury based on the novel by John Grisham.

In 2004, Miller joined CBS News.

== Awards ==
Miller received an Edward R. Murrow Award in 1998 and the Woman of the Year Award from the National Sports Foundation. She also received the National Association of Black Journalists Award of Excellence in 1997. Miller received an honorary degree from St. Francis College after delivering the keynote address at the college's 2019 commencement ceremony.

== Author ==
Miller is the author of a memoir, Belonging: A Daughter's Search for Identity Through Love and Loss, published in 2023.

== Personal life ==
Miller's father, Dr. Ross Miller, MD, was the first physician to attend to Robert F. Kennedy at the site of his assassination on June 5, 1968.
