= CBS Mornings =

American morning television program

- Genre: Morning show
- Directed by: Kelly Casse
- Presented by: Gayle King; Nate Burleson; Vladimir Duthiers; Norah O'Donnell
- Theme music composer: Gottfried Reiche; Sam Oatts; Antfood
- Opening theme: "Abblasen" by Sam Oatts with CBS' five-note jingle arranged by Antfood "CBS This Morning Eye Opener" by Joel Beckerman, Chris Maxwell and Phil Hernandez (Made Music Studio)
- Country of origin: United States
- Original language: English

Production
- Executive producer: Shawna Thomas
- Production locations: CBS Broadcast Center, New York City, New York
- Camera setup: Multi-camera
- Running time: 120 minutes (including commercials)
- Production company: CBS News

Original release
- Network: CBS
- Release: November 30, 1987 – October 29, 1999
- Release: January 9, 2012 – present

Related
- CBS This Morning (2012–2021); CBS Saturday Morning; CBS News Sunday Morning; CBS News Mornings

CBS Mornings is an American morning television program. The program debuted on Tuesday, September 7, 2021, and is produced live every weekday from 7:00 a.m. to 9:00 a.m., Eastern Time, from Studio 57 in the CBS Broadcast Center. It is co-hosted by Gayle King, Nate Burleson, Norah O'Donnell, and featured host Vladimir Duthiers. O'Donnell replaced Tony Dokoupil when he departed to become anchor of the CBS Evening News in 2025.

It is the 11th distinct weekday morning news-features program format aired by CBS since 1954, and the 10th attempt to do so since CBS resumed programming in that time slot in 1963. It serves as a direct replacement for the second incarnation of CBS This Morning.

As part of the new format, both CBS Mornings and Saturday counterpart CBS Saturday Morning were tied more closely to the long-running weekend newsmagazine CBS News Sunday Morning, including use of the latter's sun logo and "Abblasen" trumpet fanfare performed by Samuel Oatts, alongside CBS' five note jingle by Antfood, making it a partial revival of a previous CBS weekday morning show format used from 1979 to 1982.

== History ==
=== Predecessors ===
CBS has aired a number of news, and occasionally variety, formats in the morning hours since 1954, but has rarely been able to mount an ongoing challenge to either Today on NBC, or Good Morning America on ABC. From 1955 to 1982, these varied formats shared the morning timeslot on CBS with children's program Captain Kangaroo, which may have affected CBS' ability to gain momentum in the time period.

By many accounts, the second incarnation of CBS This Morning, which replaced The Early Show in 2012 and focused much more on hard news compared to its competition or its recent predecessors, was the most successful of these attempts in many years. CTM grew its audience in each of its first five years on the air, and came within a million viewers of Today during the November 2016 sweeps period. However, after several years of stability with co-hosts Charlie Rose, Gayle King and Norah O'Donnell, Rose was fired over multiple sexual harassment allegations in November 2017. The program's audience began to erode thereafter, with CTM also being affected by overall declines in linear television viewership which have depressed ratings for all broadcast network morning shows. Several subsequent shakeups, ultimately resulting in a co-host team of King, Tony Dokoupil, and Anthony Mason, did not affect the program's ratings trajectory.

=== Development ===
CBS announced in January 2021 that Shawna Thomas had been hired as the new executive producer of CBS This Morning, filling a role that had been vacant for several months. In May 2021, CBS announced that the program would relocate from the CBS Broadcast Center to a new studio at parent company ViacomCBS' headquarters at One Astor Plaza in Times Square, previously the longtime home of MTV's Total Request Live.

In August 2021, the network confirmed that retired NFL player Nate Burleson would join the program as a co-host, replacing Anthony Mason, who would move into a new role as a culture correspondent for the network. Along with the studio move, this led to speculation that CBS was seeking to revamp the program to be patterned after Good Morning America, which was also based (at the time) in Times Square and has a former NFL player, Michael Strahan, among its cast. However, executive producer Thomas denied that the program was moving towards soft news.

On Monday, August 31, 2021, CBS announced the reformatted CBS Mornings would debut with its new studio and host lineup on Tuesday, September 7, 2021. CBS Mornings debuted with a refreshed version of the set constructed for CBS' 2020 election coverage, which originated from the same studio.

On Monday, September 29, 2025, CBS Mornings moved back to Studio 57 in the CBS Broadcast Center.

On Wednesday, December 10, 2025, it was announced that Tony Dokoupil would leave the program to become the new anchor of the CBS Evening News. Dokoupil's last day as co-host was Wednesday, December 17, 2025. Dokoupil was replaced by Norah O'Donnell, who previously co-hosted CBS This Morning.

== Format ==
CBS Mornings features many of the hallmarks of its predecessor, CBS This Morning, though with some adjustments. Graphics have been updated to use the unified CBS brand identity first introduced in late 2020. The "EyeOpener" segments have been retained at the start of each hour, but the 7:00 a.m. segment now serves as both a recap of the past day in news, and a teaser for segments to come on that morning's program. The central anchor table remains in place, but more casual seating arrangements including sofas and armchairs, which were rarely seen on the main CTM set, are also used at times. The reconfigured program retained the social media and YouTube channels created for CBS This Morning.

The program also features additional long-form features similar to CBS News Sunday Morning, particularly in its second hour. This revised format had been tested with CBS This Morning beginning earlier in 2021.

Unlike its competitors, Today and Good Morning America, CBS Mornings does not have an in-house staff meteorologist, a carryover from predecessors The Early Show and CBS This Morning, the former of which eliminated on-staff weathercasters for its weekday national weather segments in 2011. Instead, weather forecasts are provided by CBS News meteorologists, both existing and local meteorologists tapped to weathercast nationally.

On September 30, 2024, CBS introduced a third hour of the show, CBS Mornings Plus, hosted by Tony Dokoupil and Adriana Diaz, which was carried on CBS News' streaming channel CBS News 24/7 and select CBS owned-and-operated stations. Most CBS stations continued to air local morning news and lifestyle shows or syndicated programming during that hour. In October 2025, the show was cancelled as part of cuts by Paramount Skydance.

== On-air staff ==
=== Current co-hosts ===
- Gayle King (January 9, 2012–present)
- Nate Burleson (September 7, 2021–present)
- Norah O'Donnell (September 10, 2012—May 16, 2019 — CBS This Morning, September 8, 2026–present)
- Vladimir Duthiers (feature host 2023–present)

=== Former co-hosts ===
- Tony Dokoupil (2021–2025)

== International broadcast ==
In Australia, a trimmed version (70 minutes excluding commercials) of CBS Mornings currently airs on Paramount-owned Network 10, along with regional affiliate Southern Cross 10, on weekday mornings from 4:30 a.m. until 6:00 a.m. AEST, with the Friday edition held over to the following Monday. A national weather map of Australia is inserted during local affiliate station's cutaways for weather reports and forecasts, and commercial advertising was inserted during the cutaway for local news updates. Currently, CBS Mornings and NBC's Today (seen on the Seven Network) are the only two American morning news programs broadcast on Australian free to air television, as the Nine Network stopped showing ABC's Good Morning America in July 2018. CBS Mornings is subject to preemption in regional areas for paid and religious programming. Unlike the Seven Network, Network 10 does not show CBS Saturday Morning.
