= Russ Mitchell =

American journalist (born 1960)

- Born: Russell Edward Mitchell; March 25, 1960 (age 66); St. Louis, Missouri, U.S.
- Education: University of Missouri
- Occupations: Journalist; news anchor
- Notable credit(s): The Early Show - Saturday edition (1997–2007, 2011); The Early Show - (weekdays) news anchor (2007–2010); CBS Evening News Weekend (Saturdays, 1999–2009, (Sundays, 2006–2010, Weekends 2010–2011); CBS News Sunday Morning
- Spouse: Karina Mahtani (m. 2006) Erica Townsend (m. 1987; div. 2000)

Russell Edward Mitchell (born March 25, 1960) is an American journalist best known for his career at CBS where he was anchor of The Early Show on Saturday, news anchor for The Early Show during the week, and weekend anchor of the CBS Evening News.

In December 2011, it was announced that he would leave CBS to join WKYC in Cleveland, Ohio, as a lead anchor, starting in January 2012.

== Biography ==
=== Early years ===
Mitchell was born in St. Louis, Missouri, and was raised in Rock Hill. He attended high school in Webster Groves in suburban St. Louis, and went on to graduate from the University of Missouri with a Bachelor of Journalism degree in 1982.

=== Career ===
Russ Mitchell's first television job came while he was still in high school, working as a part-time switchboard operator at KTVI in his native St. Louis. After graduation from Mizzou, Mitchell worked as a reporter with Kansas City television station KMBC. Mitchell was later an anchor for WFAA Dallas (1983–1985), reporter at KTVI St. Louis (1985–1987), and a weekend anchor and reporter for KMOV St. Louis (1987–92). He joined CBS News in 1992 as co-anchor of Up to the Minute. He was a correspondent for Eye to Eye on CBS (1993–95), anchor of the CBS Sunday Night News (1995-1997), an original co-anchor on Saturday Early Show (1997-2007, 2011), news anchor for the weekday edition of The Early Show (2007-2010), anchor of the CBS Sunday Evening News (2006-2011) and of the CBS Saturday Evening News (1999-2009; & both Saturday and Sunday later 2010–2011). He also substituted for Harry Smith, Jane Robelot and Mark McEwen on CBS This Morning, the predecessor to the Early Show, and was a correspondent on CBS News Sunday Morning. He was also a primary substitute for Dan Rather, John Roberts, Bob Schieffer, Katie Couric and Scott Pelley on CBS Evening News.

In December 2011, it was announced that he would move to Cleveland NBC affiliate WKYC as lead anchor and executive editor of the 6 and 11pm newscasts, where he remains today.

=== Personal life ===
Mitchell was married to Erica Townsend from 1987 to 2000. He married Karina Mahtani on December 2, 2006.

== Honors and awards ==
Mitchell has won a total of 17 national and local Emmy Awards. Honors include:

- 1989: Missouri UPI, Best Reporter honor
- 1995: National Association of Black Journalists Award
- 1997: Emmy Award, for coverage of the crash of TWA's flight 800; with two additional from the St. Louis chapter of the National Academy of Television Arts and Sciences
- 2001: Society of Professional Journalists, Sigma Delta Chi Award, for the CBS Evening News with Russ Mitchell's coverage of the Elian Gonzales story
- 2005: New York Association of Black Journalists Award, Best Documentary, for a Sunday Morning report on Stax Records
- 2006: Press Club of Metropolitan St. Louis 18th Annual Media Person of the Year
