= World Security Institute =

Former Washington D.C.-based think tank

- Abbreviation: WSI
- Formation: 1972
- Dissolved: 2012
- Type: Foreign Policy Think Tank
- Location: Washington, DC
- President: Bruce G. Blair
- Website: worldsecurityinstitute.org

The World Security Institute (WSI) was a Washington D.C.–based think tank committed to independent research and journalism on global affairs and security. Projects of WSI included the Center for Defense Information (CDI), Azimuth Media, the Pulitzer Center on Crisis Reporting, and Global Zero, among others. In the last several years of WSI's existence, Global Zero constituted more than 90% of WSI's operations.

In 2012, many of WSI's projects became independent or merged with other organizations. Global Zero received its 501(c)(3) status effective in June 2012, and began operating independently in November 2012, although WSI remained its principal sponsor for a period afterward. WSI's CDI project merged with the Project On Government Oversight, (POGO) in 2012.

The last WSI president was Bruce G. Blair, a nuclear weapons analyst and scholar formerly with the Brookings Institution, and co-founder of Global Zero.

== Divisions ==
The Center for Defense Information (CDI) developed and published expert analysis of security issues and defense policy. Its Straus Military Reform Project, directed by Winslow Wheeler, analyzed "both the fiscal and strategic implications of defense programs and promotes informed oversight of Pentagon activities."

The International Media division presented independent information and opinions about the United States to the rest of the world. WSI's foreign language information services were: Washington Observer (Chinese), Washington Prism (Persian), Washington ProFile (Russian) and Taqrir Washington (Arabic; note: taqrir means report). Johnson's Russia List synthesized and distributed English-language news about the countries of the former Soviet Union. The Institute also had satellite offices in Europe (Brussels and Moscow) and Asia (Beijing).

Azimuth Media produced television programs and documentaries on timely issues in international affairs for the general public. One project was the nationally distributed television show Foreign Exchange with Daljit Dhaliwal.

The Pulitzer Center on Crisis Reporting sponsored international travel for journalists to cover important, underreported stories.

Global Zero was – and still is, as an independent organizational successor of WSI – the international movement for the elimination of all nuclear weapons. Since its launch in Paris in December 2008, it has grown to include 300 world leaders and half a million citizens worldwide; hosted four Global Zero Summits and numerous regional conferences; built an international student movement with more than 175 campus chapters in 29 countries; produced an acclaimed documentary, Countdown to Zero, with the team behind An Inconvenient Truth; launched cutting-edge international campaigns in key countries; and produced compelling, high-production videos to reach millions of people worldwide with an empowering call to action.

== Board of Advisors ==
- Doris Z. Bato, Santa Fe, NM
- Barbara Berger, Denver, Colo.
- Bruce Berger, Denver, Colo.
- Edward H.R. Blitzer, New York, N.Y .
- Ronald Cantwell, Old Greenwich, Conn.
- Pauline Cantwell, Old Greenwich, Conn.
- Ben Cohen, Burlington, Vt.
- Joseph N. Deblinger, Manhasset, N.Y.
- Gay Dillingham, Santa Fe, N.M.
- Alan H. Fleischmann, Washington, D.C.
- Raymond Frankel, Los Angeles, Calif.
- John Fullerton, Aspen, Colo.
- Jessica Fullerton, Aspen, Colo.
- Seth M. Glickenhaus, New York, N.Y.
- Yoel Haller, M.D., Santa Barbara, Calif.
- Eva Haller, Santa Barbara, Calif.
- James D. Head, Ph.D., Chairman of the Board, Freeland, Mich.,
- Robert G. James, Rear Admiral (USNR Ret.), New York, N.Y.
- Alan F. Kay, Ph.D., Saint Augustine, Fla.
- Eugene M. Lang, New York, N.Y.
- Gene M. La Rocque, Rear Admiral (USN Ret.), Washington, D.C.
- Robert M. Meyers, MD, Deerfield, Ill.
- Ellie Meyers, Deerfield, Ill.
- David E. Moore, Rye, N.Y.
- Paul Newman, Westport, Conn.
- Julie Schecter, Ph.D., Bolton, Mass.
- Gloria Scher, New York, N.Y.
- John J. Shanahan, Vice Admiral (USN Ret.), Ormond Beach, Fla.
- Adele Starr, Mamaroneck, N.Y.
- Philip A. Straus Jr., Philadelphia, Pa.
- Andrew Ungerleider, Santa Fe, N.M.
- Steven Ungerleider, Ph.D., Eugene, Ore.
- Barbara Winslow, Ph.D., Brooklyn, N.Y.
- Joanne Woodward, Westport, Conn.

Emeritus Members

- Arthur D. Berliss Jr.
- James R. Compton
- James Donovan, Colonel, USMC (Ret.)
- David Horowitz
- Rudolph Rasin
- John M. Rockwood

== See also ==
- Government Accountability Project
- Government Accountability Office
