= Bruce G. Blair =

American nuclear security expert (1947–2020)

Bruce Gentry Blair
- Born: November 16, 1947; Creston, Iowa, U.S.
- Died: July 19, 2020 (aged 72); Philadelphia, Pennsylvania, U.S.
- Occupations: Nuclear safety and security expert, research scholar, national security expert, television show producer
- Known for: articles and books on nuclear topics

Bruce Gentry Blair (November 16, 1947 – July 19, 2020) was an American nuclear security expert, research scholar, national security expert, the author of articles and books on nuclear topics, and a television show producer.

== Education and background ==
Blair was born in Creston, Iowa. He earned a Ph.D. in operations research at Yale University in 1984. He received his B.S. in communications from the University of Illinois in 1970.

Prior to his position at Princeton, Blair was the president of the World Security Institute, a non-profit organization. He was a senior fellow in the Foreign Policy Studies Program at the Brookings Institution from 1987 to 2000. Previously, he served as a project director at the Congressional Office of Technology Assessment from 1982 to 1985, where he worked on a study of the U.S.'s ability to communicate with its strategic forces. From 1970 to 1974, Blair served in the U.S. Air Force as a Minuteman ICBM launch control officer and support officer for the Strategic Air Command's Airborne Command Post.

== Career ==
Blair was a nuclear security expert and a research scholar at the Program on Science and Global Security at Princeton University's Woodrow Wilson School of Public and International Affairs. Joining the program in May 2013, he focused on technical and policy steps on the path toward the verifiable elimination of nuclear weapons, specifically on deep bilateral nuclear arms reductions, multilateral arms negotiations and de-alerting of nuclear arsenals. He was co-founder of Global Zero, an international non-partisan group consisting of 300 world leaders, over 150 student chapters and millions of supporters worldwide dedicated to achieving the elimination of nuclear weapons.

Blair was an expert on United States and Russian security policies, specializing in nuclear forces and command and control systems. He frequently testified before Congress. In 2011, he was appointed to the U.S. Secretary of State's International Security Advisory Board, a small group of experts that provides the Department of State with independent insight and advice on all aspects of international security, disarmament and arms control. He also taught security studies as a visiting professor at Yale and Princeton universities. In 1999, he was awarded a MacArthur Fellowship Prize for his research, work and leadership on de-alerting nuclear forces. In 2008, he was selected as a finalist for the Skoll Social Entrepreneur Award.

Blair's expertise helped make nuclear and global affairs issues accessible to the public in various media outlets. He was an executive producer of Countdown to Zero, a documentary film on nuclear weapons. He also created and was the executive producer of the PBS weekly television series Superpower: Global Affairs Television (2002–2004), and was the executive producer for Azimuth Media and its weekly PBS television series, Foreign Exchange, which was first hosted by Fareed Zakaria (2005–2007) and subsequently by Daljit Dhaliwal (2008–2009).

He published the Washington ProFile (Russian), Washington Observer (Chinese), Washington Prism (Persian), Taqrir Washington (Arabic) and China Security. He was also the executive producer of two television documentaries, CNN Presents' "Deadlock: Russia's Forgotten War" and the PBS Frontline's "Missile Wars" in 2002.

He was the author of numerous books and articles on security issues in such publications as Scientific American, National Interest, The New York Times and The Washington Post. His books include Strategic Command and Control (Brookings, 1985), winner of the Edgar S. Furniss Award for its contribution to the study of national security; Crisis Stability and Nuclear War (Oxford, 1988; co-editor); The Logic of Accidental Nuclear War (Brookings, 1993); and Global Zero Alert for Nuclear Forces (Brookings, 1995).

=== Forcing the military to implement McNamara's "Permissive Action Links" ===
In 2002 Blair said he had told former U.S. Secretary of Defense Robert McNamara (1961-1968) the previous month that the secret codes (called "Permissive Action Links”) required to launch Minuteman missiles had all been set to OOOOOOOO. McNamara was shocked, because the top military leaders had assured him that those secret codes had been installed. In fact, the hardware had been installed. However, the secret codes had all been set to OOOOOOOO. Blair knew this, because one of his jobs while in the U.S. Air Force 1970 to 1974 had been as a Minuteman ICBM launch control officer. After he left the military, he began lobbying first the Department of Defense and then the U.S. Congress to change those codes to something different. They were officially "activated" in 1977. In discussing this, Blair concluded, "It is hard to know where to begin, and end, in recounting stories like this one that reveal how misinformed, misled, and misguided on critical nuclear matters our top leaders have been throughout the nuclear age."

== Death ==
Blair died in Philadelphia after a stroke on July 19, 2020.

== Books ==
- Bruce G. Blair (1979). Progress in Arms Control? Selected Readings from Scientific American. San Francisco: Freeman.
- Bruce G. Blair (1985). Strategic Command and Control: Redefining the Nuclear Threat. Washington, D.C.: Brookings.
- Bruce G. Blair; Condoleezza Rice, eds. (1987). Crisis Stability and Nuclear War. Ithaca, N.Y.: Cornell University.
- Bruce G. Blair; Kurt Gottfried, eds. (1988). Crisis Stability and Nuclear War. Oxford.
- Bruce G. Blair (1993). The Logic of Accidental Nuclear War. Washington, D.C.: Brookings. ISBN 9780815709848.
- Bruce G. Blair (1995). Global Zero Alert for Nuclear Forces. Washington, D.C.: Brookings. ISBN 9780815709411.

== Publications ==
- "Can Disarmament Work?", Foreign Affairs, co-authored with Matt Brown and Richard Burt, Josef Joff and James W. Davis, July/August 2011.
- One Hundred Nuclear Wars: Stable Deterrence between the United States and Russia at Reduced Nuclear Force Levels Off Alert in the Presence of Limited Missile Defenses, Routledge Taylor & Francis Group, co-authored with Victor Esin, Matthew McKinzie, Valery Yarynich and Pavel Zolotarev, August 9, 2011.
- "Bombs Away", The New York Times, co-authored with Damon Bosetti and Brian Weeden, December 6, 2010.
- "Could Terrorists Launch America's Nuclear Missiles?", Time, November 11, 2010.
- "Smaller and Safer: A New Plan For Nuclear Postures", Foreign Affairs, co-authored with Victor Esin, Matthew McKinzie, Valery Yarynich and Pavel Zolotarev, September/October 2010.
- "De-Alerting Strategic Forces", in Reykjavik Revisited: Steps Toward a World Free of Nuclear Weapons, George P. Shultz, Sidney D. Drell, and James E. Goodby, eds., (Stanford, CA: Hoover Institution Press, 2008).
- "Increasing warning and decision time ('De-Alerting')", (International Conference, Achieving the Vision of a World Free of Nuclear Weapons, Oslo, February 26–27, 2008).
- "A Rebuttal of the U.S. Statement on the Alert Status of U.S. Nuclear Forces", Bruce Blair's Nuclear Column, Center for Defense Information, November 6, 2007.
- "Primed and Ready", Bulletin of the Atomic Scientists, January/February 2007.
- "The Fallacy of Nuclear Primacy", China Security, co-authored with Chen Yali (Washington, D.C.: World Security Institute), Autumn 2006.
- "The Oil Weapon: Myth of China's Vulnerability", China Security, co-authored with Chen Yali and Eric Hagt (Washington, D.C.: World Security Institute, Summer 2006).
- "Editors' Notes: The Space Security Dilemma", China Security, co-authored with Chen Yali (Washington, D.C: World Security Institute, Issue No. 2 (2006).
- "General Zhu and Chinese Nuclear Preemption", China Security (Washington, D.C: World Security Institute, Issue No. 1(2005).
- "Iran and the Rogues: America's Nuclear Obsession," Bruce Blair's Nuclear Column, Center for Defense Information, September 19, 2005.
- "The Wrong Deterrence: The Threat of Loose Nukes Is One of Our Own Making", The Washington Post, September 19, 2004.
- "The Logic of Intelligence Failure," Forum on Physics and Society, American Physical Society, April 2004. (Also presented at the 10th International Castiglioncello Conference: "Unilateral Actions and Military Interventions: The Future of Nonproliferation," April 1, 2004.)
- "Keeping Presidents in the Nuclear Dark (Episode #2: The SIOP Option that Wasn't)", Bruce Blair's Nuclear Column, Center for Defense Information, February 17, 2004.
- "Keeping Presidents in the Nuclear Dark (Episode #1: The Case of the Missing Permissive Action Links)," Bruce Blair's Nuclear Column, Center for Defense Information, February 11, 2004.
- "Rogue States: Nuclear Red-Herrings," Bruce Blair's Nuclear Column, Center for Defense Information, December 5, 2003.
- "We Keep Building Nukes for All the Wrong Reasons", The Washington Post, May 25, 2003.
- "Nuclear Recollections", The Defense Monitor, April/May 2003.
- "The Folly of Nuclear War-Gaming for Korea and South Asia", Bruce Blair's Nuclear Column, Center for Defense Information, April 30, 2003.
- "Hair-Trigger Missiles Risk Catastrophic Nuclear Terrorism", Bruce Blair's Nuclear Column, Center for Defense Information, April 29, 2003.
- "Nuclear Time Warp", The Defense Monitor, May 2002.
- "The Ultimate Hatred is Nuclear", The New York Times, October 22, 2001.
- "Nukes: A Lesson from Russia", The Washington Post, July 11, 2001.
- Toward True Security: Ten Steps The Next President Should Take to Transform U.S. Nuclear Weapons Policy , with Richard L. Garwin, Frank von Hippel, et al. (Cambridge, MA: UCS Publications, February 2008).
- Toward True Security: A U.S. Nuclear Posture for the Decade , with Richard L. Garwin, Frank von Hippel, and others (Cambridge, MA: UCS Publications, June 2001).
- "Trapped in the Nuclear Math", The New York Times, June 13, 2000.
- "A Longer Nuclear Fuse ", with Frank von Hippel, The Washington Post, June 6, 2000.
- "Some Sensible Options for U.S. Missile Defense", Moscow Times, June 3, 2000.
- "Russia's Aging War Machine: Economic Weakness and the Nuclear Threat", co-authored with Cliff Gaddy, The Brookings Review, June 22, 1999.
- The Nuclear Turning Point: A Blueprint for Deep Cuts and De-alerting of Nuclear Weapons, co-authored with Harold Feiveson, ed., Frank von Hippel, and others (Washington, DC: Brookings Institution Press, 1999).
- "Loose Cannon", National Interest, Summer 1998.
- "The Plight of the Russian Military and Nuclear Control", in Report of the Commission To Assess The Ballistic Missile Threat To The United States, July 15, 1998.
- "From Nuclear Deterrence to Mutual Safety", with Sam Nunn, The Washington Post, June 22, 1997.
- "Accidental Nuclear War – A Post-Cold War Assessment", with L. Farrow and others, New England Journal of Medicine, April 30, 1998.
- "Redoubling Nuclear Weapons Reduction", with Harold Feiveson and Frank von Hippel, The Washington Post, November 12, 1997.
- "Dismantle Armageddon", with Henry W. Kendall, The New York Times, May 21, 1994.
- "Russia's Doomsday Machine", The New York Times, October 8, 1993.
- "Lighten Up on Ukraine", The New York Times, June 1, 1993.
