= Norah O'Donnell =

American television journalist

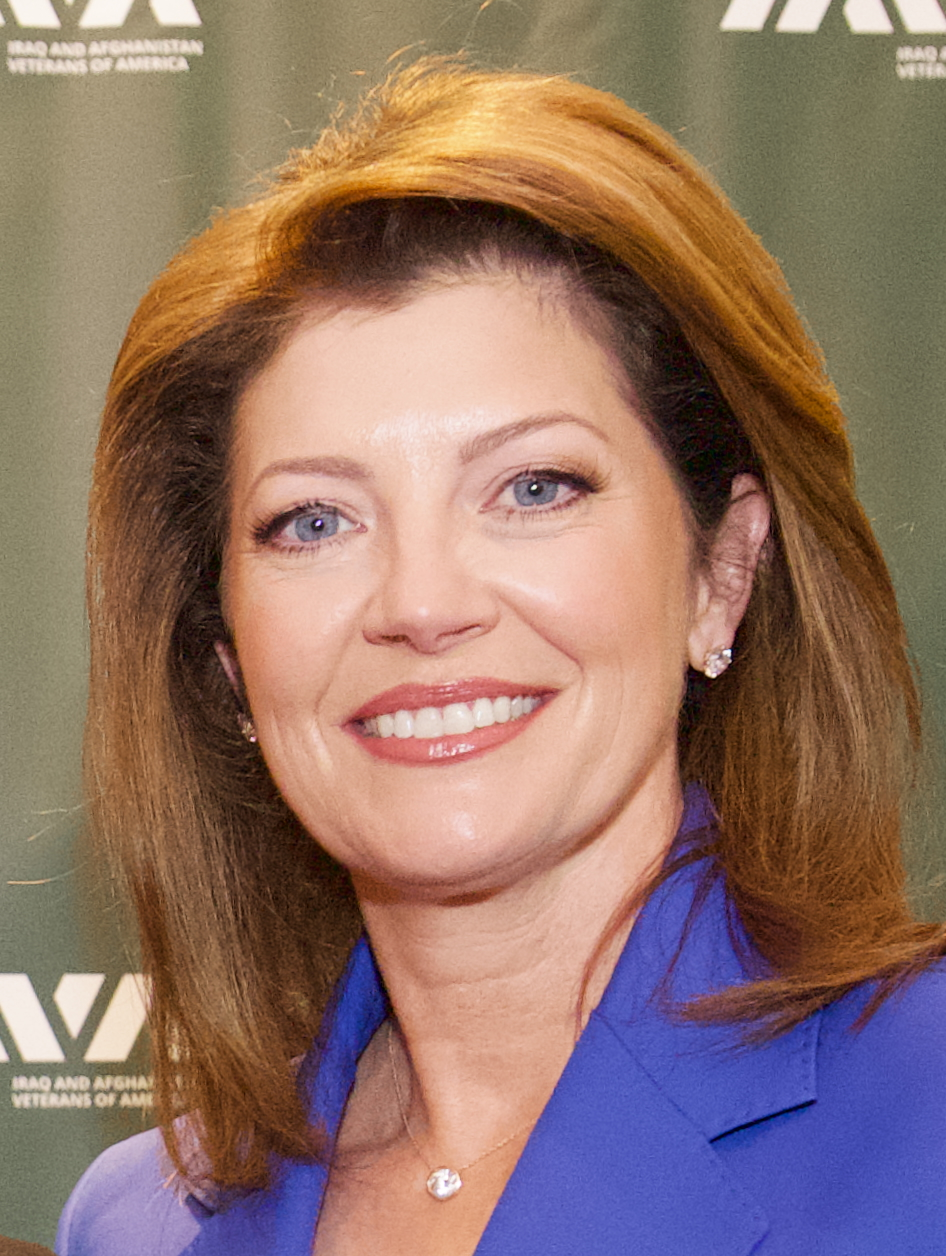
- O'Donnell in 2025
- Born: Norah Morahan O'Donnell; January 23, 1974 (age 52); Washington, D.C., U.S.
- Education: Georgetown University (BA, MA)
- Occupation: Television journalist
- Years active: 1996–present
- Notable credits: The Chris Matthews Show; NBC Nightly News; Dateline NBC; Weekend Today; CBS This Morning; CBS Evening News; 60 Minutes; CBS Mornings
- Spouse: Geoff Tracy (m. 2001)
- Children: 3
- Website: cbsnews.com/team/norah-odonnell

Norah Morahan O'Donnell (born January 23, 1974) is an American television journalist who is a senior correspondent for CBS News, Co-Host of CBS Mornings and a correspondent for 60 Minutes. She is also the host of occasional Person to Person interview specials. Previously, she was the anchor of the CBS Evening News between 2019 and 2025, co-anchor of CBS This Morning between 2012 and 2019, Chief White House Correspondent for CBS News, and a substitute host for CBS's Sunday morning show Face the Nation.

== Early life and education ==
O'Donnell was born in Washington, D.C., the daughter of Noreen Bernadette (O'Kane) and Francis Lawrence O'Donnell, a medical doctor and U.S. Army officer. Her parents are both of Irish descent, with roots in Derry, Belfast, and County Donegal (meaning she is descended from both sides of the Irish border). Three of her grandparents were immigrants, and her maternal grandfather lived in the U.S. illegally for 16 years. When Norah was three, her family moved to San Antonio, Texas. Beginning when she was 10, the family spent two years in Seoul, living in Yongsan Garrison as her father was assigned to work there. While an elementary student, she started her career in broadcasting by giving videotaped English lessons for the Korean Educational Development Institute. The family moved back to San Antonio, where she attended Douglas MacArthur High School, from which she graduated in 1991. She then went on to attend Georgetown University, where she graduated in 1995 with a Bachelor of Arts degree in philosophy and a Master of Arts degree in liberal studies in 2003.

== Career ==
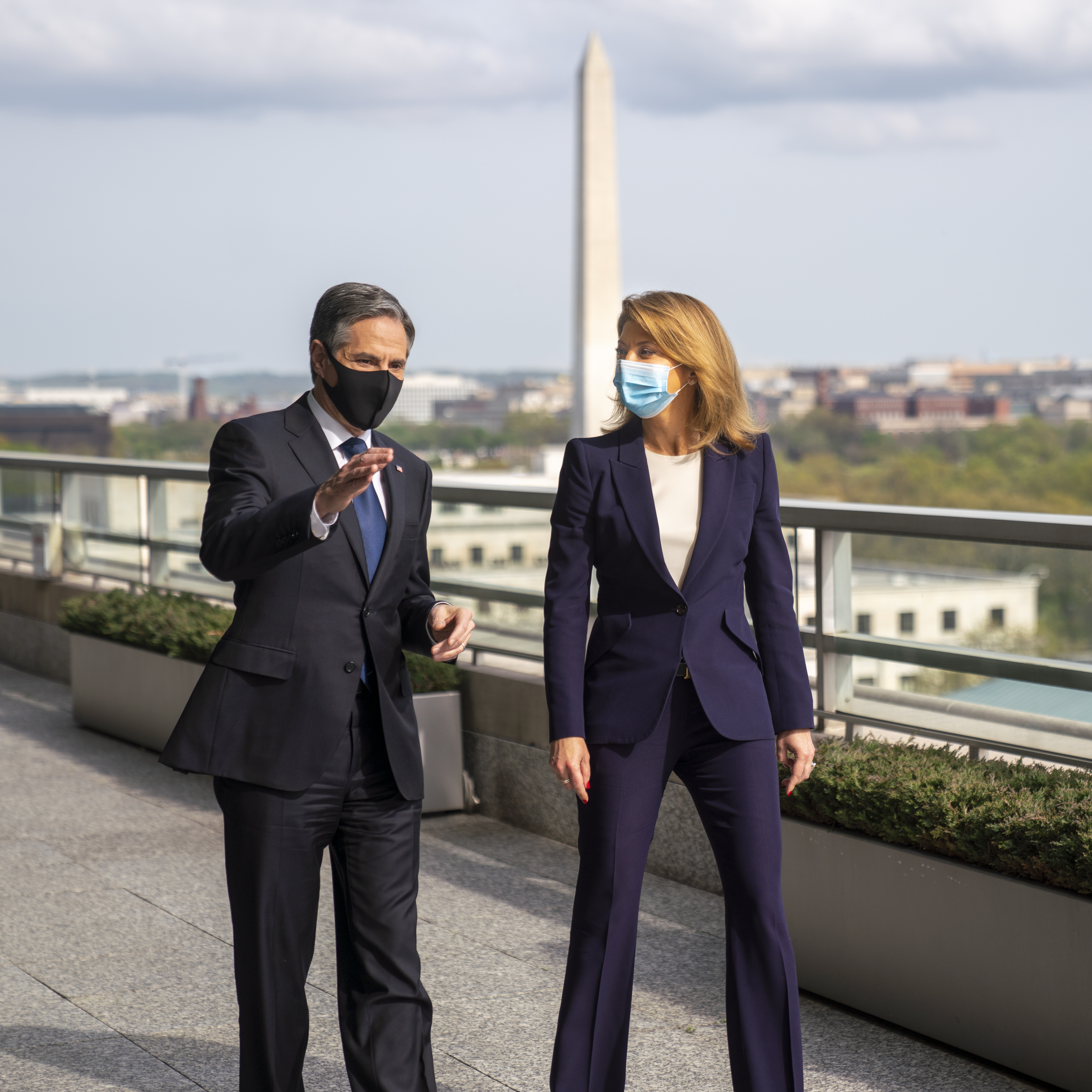
O'Donnell speaks to U.S. Secretary of State Antony Blinken at the U.S. State Department in April 2021.

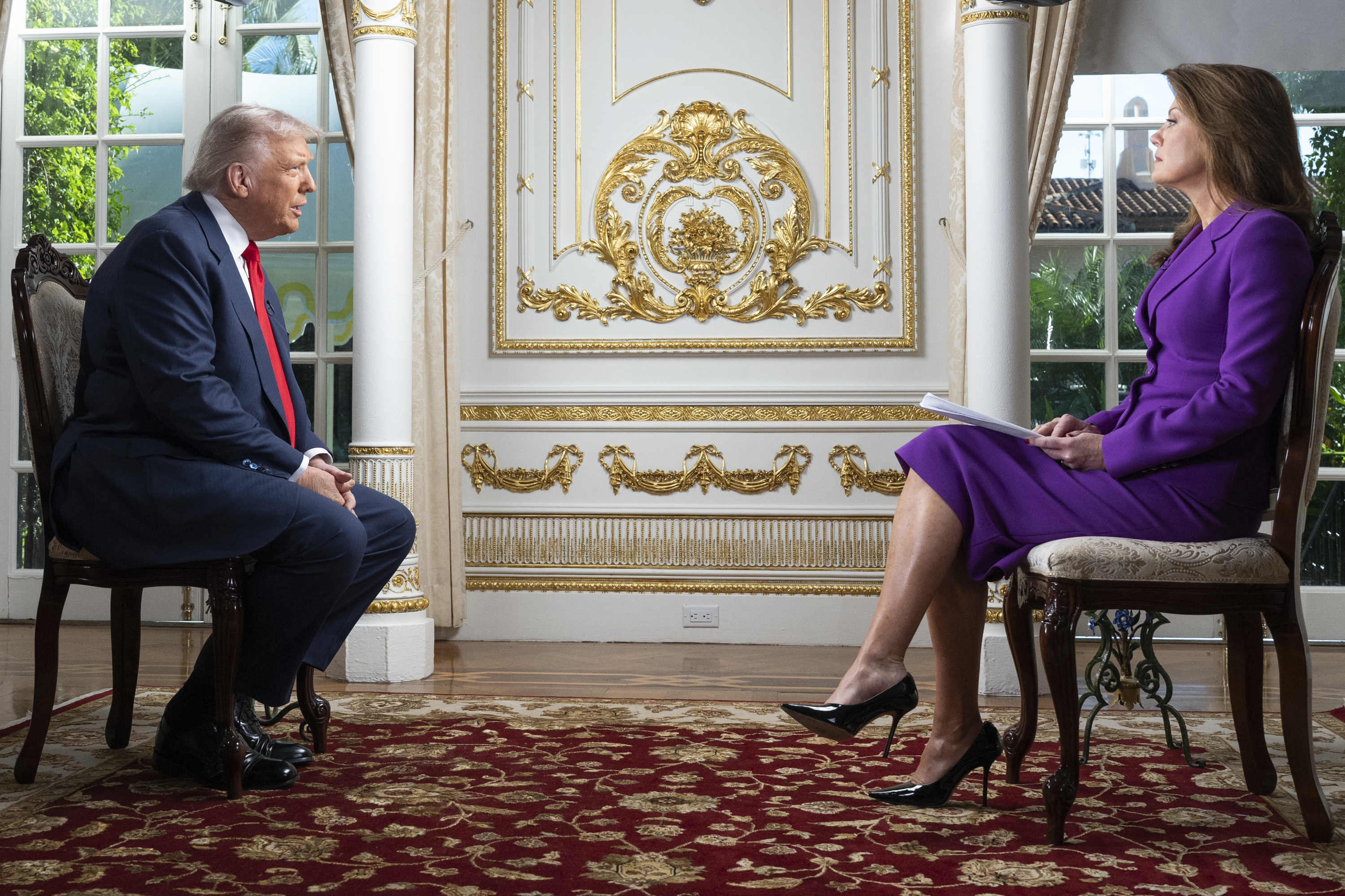
O'Donnell interviewing President Donald Trump, October 2025

O'Donnell worked as a staff writer for Roll Call, where she covered Congress. She spent twelve years of her career at the NBC networks. A commentator for the Today Show, Chief Washington Correspondent for MSNBC, and a White House correspondent for NBC News, O'Donnell was also a contributing anchor for MSNBC Live and an anchor on Weekend Today. O'Donnell reported for various NBC News broadcasts, including NBC Nightly News, The Today Show, Dateline NBC, and MSNBC. O'Donnell filled in for Chris Matthews as host of Hardball with Chris Matthews and was a regular pundit for The Chris Matthews Show.

Since joining CBS, she has served as anchor in several of its highest-rated shows, filling in for Scott Pelley on the CBS Evening News multiple times, the first being October 10, 2011. She was chief White House correspondent in 2011 and 2012, and became a co-anchor on CBS This Morning in fall of 2012. On May 6, 2019, Susan Zirinsky, president of CBS News, announced that O'Donnell had been named anchor and managing editor of the CBS Evening News beginning on July 15, 2019, and also would be the lead anchor of political events for the network and continue as a contributing correspondent for 60 Minutes. She became the third woman after Connie Chung and Katie Couric to serve as the program's weeknight anchor. Her last broadcast of CBS This Morning was on May 16, 2019. On April 8, 2022, O'Donnell extended her contract with CBS News to remain as anchor of CBS Evening News, through the 2024 election and afterward. In May 2024, O'Donnell interviewed Pope Francis in Vatican City for 60 Minutes. The interview made headlines for the Pope's discussion of surrogacy, gay marriage and female priests.

In July 2024, O'Donnell announced that her tenure at CBS Evening News would end following the 2024 United States presidential election, after which she would become a senior correspondent for CBS News. On November 22, 2024, she announced that she would be leaving CBS Evening News on January 24, 2025, which was later moved up to January 23, 2025, due to the coverage of the 2025 Farmers Insurance Open.

In October 2025, it was reported that Bari Weiss, the new Editor-in-Chief of CBS News, was considering O’Donnell to return as host of CBS Evening News. However, Tony Dokoupil was ultimately selected for the role.

In July 2026, 60 Minutes executive producer Nick Bilton announced in an employee memo that O'Donnell had been promoted to full-time correspondent for the broadcast.

On September 3, 2026 CBS announced that Norah O'Donnell has been named Co-Anchor of CBS Mornings alongside Gayle King and Nate Burleson starting on September 8, 2026.

O’Donnell effectively fills the third seat previously occupied by Tony Dokoupil, who moved to the CBS Evening News. CBS Mornings executive producer Jon Tower characterized O’Donnell's return as a “homecoming” and emphasized the established chemistry between King and O’Donnell.

== Personal life ==
=== Family ===
O'Donnell lives in Washington, D.C., and New York City's Upper West Side neighborhood with her husband, restaurateur Geoff Tracy (owner of D.C. restaurant Chef Geoff's), whom she married in June 2001. They met while attending Georgetown University together. On May 20, 2007, O'Donnell and Tracy became the parents of twins, whom they named Grace and Henry. Their third child, daughter Riley Norah Tracy, was born on July 5, 2008. O'Donnell said that her daughter's first name had been suggested by Tim Russert, who died three weeks prior to Riley's birth. O'Donnell and Tracy made a cookbook for parents titled Baby Love: Healthy, Easy, Delicious Meals for Your Baby and Toddler, released on August 31, 2010.

=== Health ===
In fall 2016, O'Donnell was diagnosed with melanoma 'in situ', meaning the cancer was contained to the epidermis and had not yet spread to the dermis and metastasized. She underwent surgery soon after where a "three-inch-long piece of skin from the upper left corner of [her] back" was excised. She later stated that she gets regular skin check-ups "every three to four months" and "multiple skin biopsies" due to her high risk. In the years since her diagnosis O'Donnell has become a skin care advocate, encouraging others, especially women, to get regular dermatological check-ups and take better care of their skin by practicing good skin care routines such as using sunscreen. She discussed her diagnosis with her dermatologist live on CBS This Morning in 2017.

== Awards and recognition ==
Washingtonian Magazine has named O'Donnell as one of Washington's 100 most powerful women. O'Donnell has also been named to Irish American Magazine's 2000 "Top 100 Irish Americans" list.

O'Donnell won the Sigma Delta Chi Award for Breaking News Coverage for the Dateline NBC story "DC In Crisis," which aired on the night of September 11, 2001.

She won an Emmy as part of NBC News's Election Night coverage team in 2008 for the category Outstanding Live Coverage of a Breaking News Story – Long Form. She was also awarded an Emmy in 2018 for her six-month investigation and report on "Sexual Assault in the Air Force Academy" for CBS This Morning in the category Outstanding Investigative Report in a Newscast. That same year, this story was given an honorable mention from the White House Correspondents' Association for the Edgar Allan Poe Award.

Media offices
Preceded by Jeff Glor	CBS Evening News Weekday Edition Anchor; July 15, 2019 – January 23, 2025	Succeeded by Maurice DuBois and John Dickerson
