= Komi (restaurant) =

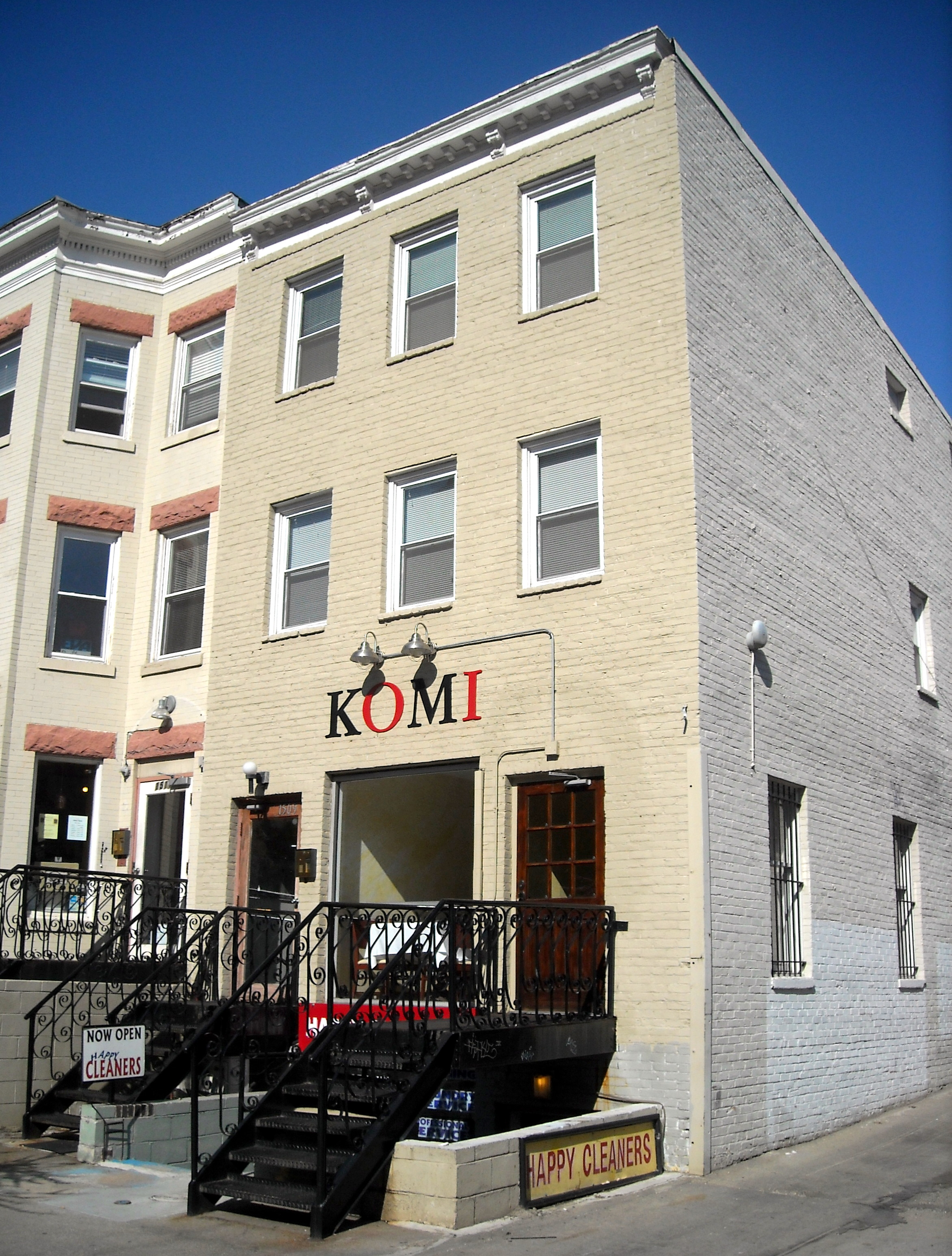
- Interactive map of Komi

Restaurant information
- Established: 2003
- Closed: 2021
- Owner: Johnny Monis
- Chef: Johnny Monis
- Food type: Mediterranean
- Dress code: Casual
- Rating: Closed
- Location: 1509 17th Street NW, Washington D.C., 20036, United States
- Coordinates: 38°54′36″N 77°02′18″W
- Seating capacity: 55

Komi was a restaurant in Washington, D.C. operated by Chef Johnny Monis, serving Italian cuisine and Greek cuisine.

Komi was located at 1509 17th St. NW in Washington, D.C. It opened in 2003, serving wood-fired pizzas and an à la carte menu of soups, salads, and entrees for lunch and dinner.

In the winter of 2006, Chef Monis shut down the restaurant for two weeks, removing a majority of the tables and re-opening with a prix-fixe multi-course menu priced at $84, only available for dinner. This new incarnation of Komi earned rave reviews, landing the No.1 spot on Washingtonian Magazine's Best Restaurants in DC in 2009. It held this top spot through 2012, as it became one of the most acclaimed restaurants in the city.

President Barack Obama and First Lady Michelle Obama dined at Komi in May 2010.

Komi earned a Michelin star in the 2018 Michelin Guide for Washington, DC. In his 2018 Fall Dining Guide, Washington Post food critic Tom Sietsema named Komi to his ten-restaurant Hall of Fame.

By September, 2022, Komi had closed due to the pandemic and "morphed into Happy Gyro, a… Greek deli-style takeout."

== Chef Johnny Monis ==
Johnny Monis was born and raised in Arlington, Virginia, where his family owned La Casa Pizzeria. His parents were born on the Greek island of Chios, and Komi is named for a taverna-lined beach on Chios where the family vacationed.

Monis enrolled as a premed at James Madison University but dropped out to attend the College of the Culinary Arts at Johnson & Wales University in Charleston, South Carolina. He did not finish culinary school, however, because he believed he was learning more by working at McCrady's Restaurant.

In 2001, Monis was hired to work at the Washington, D.C. restaurant Chef Geoff's, where he was quickly promoted and was named the executive chef of a new Chef Geoff's location downtown. In 2003, Monis quit to open his own restaurant, Komi.

In April 2007, Food & Wine magazine named Monis one of the F&W 2007 Best New Chefs. In 2013, Monis won a James Beard Foundation Award for Best Chef, Mid-Atlantic.

In 2011, Monis opened a separate restaurant on the floor below Komi, the Thai-inspired Little Serow, which was named one of the best new restaurants in America by Bon Appétit magazine.

== Awards ==
- 2007 Best New Chefs Food & Wine Magazine.
- 2009 Very Best Restaurants in DC, No.1, Washingtonian Magazine.
- 2013 Best Chef, Mid-Atlantic, James Beard Foundation Award.
- 2018 – 2021 Michelin Star, Michelin Guide.

== See also ==
- List of Michelin-starred restaurants in Washington, D.C.
