= Martin Savidge =

American television news correspondent (born 1958)

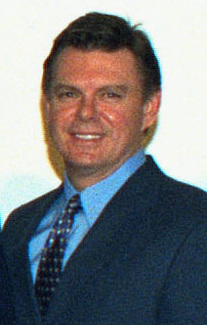
- Savidge in 2004
- Born: May 27, 1958 (age 67); Lachine, Quebec, Canada
- Education: Ohio University
- Occupations: Television journalist and broadcaster
- Notable credit(s): Anchor of Worldfocus, NBC News correspondent
- Children: Stehl Savidge, Blis Savidge

Martin Savidge (born May 27, 1958) is a Canadian-American television news correspondent.

Savidge worked for NBC News and was a special correspondent and former anchor for public television's Worldfocus nightly news program in the role of a special correspondent. He previously worked for WJW, Cleveland, where he also worked with current NBC correspondent Kelly O'Donnell. Savidge began anchoring CNN Newsroom in January 2011.

== Biography ==
Savidge was born in Lachine, Quebec, Canada, to British parents, who soon after moved to the United States. He holds dual citizenship for both Canada and the United States. Savidge grew up in Rocky River, Ohio and graduated from Rocky River High School in 1976. He studied theater at Beck Center for the Arts in Lakewood, Ohio. Savidge earned a bachelor's degree in journalism from Ohio University in 1981.

Savidge's early career in journalism included a stint at WCIA in Champaign, Illinois and prime time anchor for WMBD-TV in Peoria, Illinois. He interned at WKYC, and reported for the Associated Press. In September 1984, Savidge joined WJW-TV (then WJKW-TV), where he won nine Emmy Awards, five in Savidge's final year at the station. One Emmy-winning special examined the background of D-Day, and was inspired by his father Earnest, who served in the Royal Navy during World War II. Despite being a local reporter, Savidge's datelines while at WJW-TV included Vietnam, Russia, and Ukraine.

In 1996, he was hired by CNN. Savidge would still be a field reporter, but he would spend more time as anchor.

Savidge joined NBC News in March 2004, but remained in Atlanta. In 2005, Savidge reported for NBC News in New Orleans, Louisiana, when Hurricane Katrina struck the Gulf Coast. After Katrina, he helped, as head correspondent, open an NBC News bureau in New Orleans. He regularly gave reports about improvements and stories after Katrina.

In October 2008, Savidge left full-time work at NBC to be the anchor of Worldfocus, an American newscast focusing on international news.

On 13 January 2009, Savidge began hosting a weekly radio show on BlogTalkRadio. The 30-minute talk show is focused on international news and includes a panel of guests.

On 28 August 2009, Savidge announced on the program that Daljit Dhaliwal would be taking over his role on Worldfocus, although he would still host one week a month and have an opportunity to "step out from behind the desk".

Savidge returned to CNN in 2009 as a freelancer. In March 2011, he again became a CNN staffer. On December 1, 2022, it was announced he was let go from CNN, along with numerous other CNN personalities.

== Awards ==
Savidge's awards include:

- Two Headliner Awards
- Two Edward R. Murrow Awards
- A Peabody Award
- A duPont-Columbia Award
- Six Associated Press Awards
- Two United Press Intl. Awards
- Nine local Emmy awards
- 2002 "Media Person of the Year" (from the National Journalism Education Association)
