= Carlos Watson =

Carlos Watson may refer to:

- Carlos Watson (footballer) (born 1951), former Costa Rican footballer
- Carlos Watson (journalist) (born 1969), American journalist, businessman, and television host
- Carlos Watson, chair of the Republican Party of Texas in 1952
