= Neal Shapiro =

American television executive

- Education: BA
- Alma mater: Tufts University
- Occupation: Media executive
- Years active: 1980–present
- Employer: WNET
- Title: President Emeritus
- Spouse: Juju Chang (m. 1995)
- Children: 3
- Awards: Winner of 32 Emmys, 31 Edward R. Murrow Awards, and 3 Columbia DuPont awards
- Website: WNET Biography

Neal B. Shapiro is the President Emeritus of WNET. He worked previously as the president of NBC News and the executive producer for Dateline NBC. Prior to this Shapiro spent 13 years as a news producer at ABC News.

== Early life ==
Shapiro was born to a practicing Jewish family and raised in Delmar, New York. He attended Bethlehem Central High School graduating in 1976. He went on to graduate magna cum laude from Tufts University in 1980, with degrees in history and political science.

== Career with ABC ==
Shapiro worked with ABC News from 1980 until 1993, where he eventually became a producer for PrimeTime Live. He also produced for Nightline and spent time working in the Chicago news bureau.

== Career with NBC ==
=== Executive producer of Dateline NBC ===
In 1993 he was named the executive producer of Dateline NBC, and worked to address the aftermath of a series of dismissals at NBC regarding a fake news story produced by the show. According to his alma mater, "Shapiro oversaw the production of several major breaking-news stories, such as the Oklahoma City bombing, the death of Princess Diana, the Columbine tragedy, the war in Kosovo, and the Clinton impeachment trial when he worked as the executive producer of the Emmy Award winning Dateline. He also served as the executive producer for several hour-long specials, including reports on corporate layoffs in America, migrant farm workers, and welfare reform."

In 1998 Shapiro took the show from one night to five nights per week, producing about 800 news stories per year. Upon the expansion of the program, Shapiro stated that the news magazines of each of the major American networks had each pushed the genre, and helped Dateline become a nightly primetime program. That year the New York Times said that, "Under Mr. Shapiro's guiding hand – and not always to the delight of media critics – Dateline has rewritten the rules of the news magazine show." In a later article, the New York Times said of Shapiro's time at Dateline that he "presided over the expansion of that show to multiple nights, a trend that was later followed by newsmagazines at both ABC and CBS. Under Mr. Shapiro, "Dateline" won 25 Emmy Awards 19 Edward R. Murrow Awards, three Columbia-DuPont awards" and a Gerald Loeb Award.

=== President of NBC News ===
Shapiro was appointed the president of NBC News in June 2001, and was also put in charge of overseeing MSNBC. He oversaw the transition between NBC Nightly News anchors Tom Brokaw and Brian Williams. In 2003 he was the architect of the NBC news coverage of the Iraq War.

TV News Check summarized some additional projects that Shapiro undertook, writing that, "He led the No. 1-rated news programs in every day part: Today in the morning, NBC Nightly News in the evening and Meet the Press on Sunday morning ... On cable, Shapiro oversaw the news operations of MSNBC and developed Countdown with Keith Olbermann and Scarborough Country with Joe Scarborough. He also created NBC News Productions which produces programming for many cable channels, including A&E, Bravo, Court TV, Discovery, History, and Lifetime.

In the world of syndication, Shapiro developed two successful syndicated programs produced by NBC News, The Chris Matthews Show and Your Total Health with Hoda Kotb. On the Web, he spearheaded a number of changes at MSNBC. He expanded NBC News Radio, and began podcasts and cell phone reports. He also helped create and launch NBC's digital weather channel, Weatherplus."

In all, Shapiro won 32 Emmys, 31 Edward R. Murrow Awards, and 3 Columbia DuPont awards during his time at NBC (including those awarded during his time at Dateline).

== Career with WNET ==
In January 2008 Shapiro was named CEO of WNET public television. According to Forbes magazine, one of his first moves was to start the programs "Sunday Arts, which features the great museum exhibits, films, galleries and performances going on in New York City, and ... Reel 13, which air[ed] on Saturday nights and pair[ed] a classic movie with an indie film and a short film created by [their] viewers".

Shapiro created the news program Worldfocus as a public television owned news broadcast in lieu of the prior practice of airing foreign news programs on American public television, saying that, "it’s good for public television to have a show that belongs to public television ... Are we taking a chance? Absolutely; that’s what innovation is about." The show ran from 2009 to 2010, receiving internal financing as well as funding from The Peter G. Peterson Foundation. He also oversaw the sale of the public television news coverage paper Current, a public media-focused trade publication, to the American University School of Communication, saying, according to the New York Times that "he found it odd for his organization to publish a paper" about its own industry. In 2011 Shapiro led the bid to manage New Jersey’s public television station that was then renamed NJTV, which brought New Jersey public television under the same umbrella.

Other programs Shapiro commissioned include New York War Stories, New York Goes to War, Need to Know, and A Cry for Help: A Generation at Risk?, in addition to the expansion of the network's classic movie slots to include more recent independent pictures that appeal to a younger audience.

On January 13, 2026, Shapiro announced that he will retire as the President and CEO of The WNET Group. He was succeeded by Edward O'Keefe which O'Keefe took on the role on September 21. Shapiro became President Emeritus of the station and is expected to retire at the end of the year.

== Other positions and recognition ==
Shapiro has taught at both the Columbia University Graduate School of Journalism and his alma mater, Tufts University. He has also lectured at schools including MIT and Stanford. In 2002 he was awarded the Light on the Hill award by Tufts, and spoke on his method of reporting the news following 9/11. In 2008, Shapiro received the P.T. Barnum Award from Tufts for his exceptional work in the field of media and entertainment. He has also been the recipient of Sigma Delta Chi Awards, Chris Awards, the George Polk Award, and the Investigative Reporter and Editor Award.

In 2007 Shapiro was elected to the board of directors of the Gannett Company for his "diverse experience with network news and public television" according to chairman Craig A. Dubow. On October 6, 2008, Shapiro was chosen to ring the closing bell of the NASDAQ exchange in New York City. He has served as chairman of the Communications and Media Studies Alumni Advisory Board for his alma mater Tufts University. He is also a member of the Peabody Awards board of directors, which is presented by the University of Georgia's Henry W. Grady College of Journalism and Mass Communication.

== Personal life ==
In 1995, Shapiro married ABC News correspondent Juju Chang. Chang converted to Judaism upon their marriage. They have three sons: Jared (born 2000), Travis (born 2003), and Mason (born 2007).
