= Tom Carver =

Writer and former BBC foreign correspondent

- Born: Thomas Richard Carver; 1960 (age 65–66); Hereford, UK
- Education: The King's School, Canterbury; University of Bristol
- Occupations: Head of global communications, Carnegie Endowment for International Peace, author
- Spouse: Katty Kay (m. 1999)
- Children: 4
- Relatives: Oswald Carver (grandfather); Bernard Montgomery, 1st Viscount Montgomery of Alamein (step-grandfather)
- Website: http://www.tomcarver.net

Thomas Richard Carver (born 1960) is a writer and former BBC foreign correspondent.

== Early life ==
Carver was born in Hereford in 1960. His grandfather, Oswald Carver, was an Olympic oarsman who rowed in the 1908 Summer Olympics in London. He was killed during the Battle of Gallipoli in 1915 aged 28. His paternal grandmother, Elizabeth Carver, then married Bernard Montgomery in 1927. Montgomery went on to become known as a General and Field Marshal in the Second World War.

Carver was educated at The King's School in Canterbury, an independent boarding school for boys (now co-educational), followed by the University of Bristol. Carver was 15 when Montgomery died, and formed part of the guard of honour at his funeral at St. George's Chapel, Windsor Castle, as part of his school cadet force.

== Career ==
Carver joined the BBC as a local radio trainee. He became a BBC foreign correspondent, reporting on the withdrawal of the Soviet Army from Afghanistan, the collapse of the Soviet Union and the first Gulf War. In 1991, he was sent into northern Iraq to investigate reports that Saddam Hussein was massacring the Kurds and became one of the first journalists to witness the exodus of half a million Kurds across the mountains towards Turkey.

In 1991, he became BBC Africa correspondent for three years, covering the US-led invasion of Somalia otherwise known as Operation Restore Hope, the Angolan Civil War and the transition to black majority rule in South Africa. In 1994, he covered the Rwandan genocide.

In 1995, he reported on the Massacre of Srebrenica during the Bosnian War as the BBC's Defence Correspondent.

In 1997, he became the BBC Washington correspondent remaining in the post for 8 years. He reported on the murders of dozens of women in Juarez, Mexico and covered the disputed 2000 presidential election. He was appointed BBC Newsnight Washington correspondent and was an eyewitness to the attack on Washington on the 11th September 2001.

In 2003, he was one of the few journalists to travel with Vice-President Dick Cheney through the Middle East in a prelude to the Iraq War. He covered the 2004 election and was at the 2004 Democratic National Convention when Barack Obama gave his first national speech. He left the BBC after the election to become Senior Vice-President at Control Risks.

In 2008, he took up the post of Senior Vice-President at Chlopak, Leonard, Schechter a Washington-based communications consultancy before joining the Carnegie Endowment for International Peace as head of Global Communications.

Carver has written for numerous newspapers, including The Independent, London Review of Books, The Sunday Times, New Statesman and The Guardian.

Carver is the author of Where the hell have you been?, an account of his father Richard Carver's adventures during the Second World War in Italy, especially in Abruzzo's campaigns. It includes his escape from prisoner-of-war camp PG 49 at Fontanellato due to opening the gates the day after the Armistice of 8 September 1943 as required by the instrument of surrender itself.

== Personal life ==
Since 1999, Carver has been married to BBC news anchor Katty Kay. The couple have four children.
