= Katty Kay =

British journalist

- Kay in 2026
- Born: Katherine Kay; 14 November 1964 (age 61); Wallingford, Berkshire, England
- Education: St Hilda's College, Oxford (BA)
- Occupations: Journalist; News presenter
- Employers: BBC; MS NOW
- Board member of: International Women's Media Foundation
- Spouses: Sebastian Mallaby (m. 1989, divorced); Tom Carver (m. 1999)
- Children: 4

Katherine "Katty" Kay (born 14 November 1964) is a British-Swiss journalist, author and broadcaster. She presented BBC World News America and, with Christian Fraser, hosted Beyond 100 Days on BBC Four, BBC News and BBC World News. She has anchored BBC coverage of two Presidential elections. She also appears regularly on MS NOW as a co-host of Morning Joe.

Kay has co-written two books with ABC News correspondent Claire Shipman: Womenomics (2009) and The Confidence Code: The Science and Art of Self-Assurance—What Women Should Know (2014). Kay also co-hosted the podcast When Katty Met Carlos with Ozy Media CEO Carlos Watson. Having joined Ozy Media from the BBC in June 2021, she resigned that September after a New York Times report raised questions about Ozy's business practices. Since April 2024, Kay has co-hosted the podcast The Rest is Politics: US Edition with Anthony Scaramucci (former White House Director of Communications for Donald Trump). Kay is a board member at the International Women's Media Foundation.

== Early life and education ==
Kay was born on 14 November 1964 in Wallingford, Oxfordshire, and grew up in Blewbury. She has two brothers and one sister; and is of English and Swiss descent. As a child, she spent time in various Middle Eastern countries where her father was posted as a British diplomat. She studied modern languages at St Hilda's College, Oxford, and speaks fluent French and Italian. She graduated with a Bachelor of Arts degree in 1988.

== Career ==
After graduation, Kay briefly worked for the Bank of England. Deciding against a career in economics, she left to work for an aid agency in Zimbabwe.

A short time later, a friend, Matt Frei, came to her with a tape recorder and persuaded her to become a journalist. Kay joined the BBC in 1990 as Zimbabwe correspondent for the African section of the BBC World Service. She then returned to London to work for BBC World Service radio, before being posted to Tokyo for BBC News television in 1992 and then Washington, D.C., in 1996. Soon afterwards, she joined The Times news bureau, but returned to the BBC as a freelance journalist in 2002, based in the United States.

From June 2004, Kay co-presented the BBC World news bulletins with Mike Embley in London, shown on 230 public broadcast-television stations throughout the US and on BBC America. In October 2007, she became correspondent to presenter Matt Frei of BBC World's one-hour Washington-based news broadcast, BBC World News America. She anchored the show until June 2021.

Kay also makes frequent appearances as a guest panellist on Morning Joe and Meet the Press on NBC, Real Time with Bill Maher on HBO, and in the past also appeared on The Chris Matthews Show, and Larry King Live on CNN. She occasionally substituted for Diane Rehm on The Diane Rehm Show on National Public Radio (NPR). In November 2025, Kay was mentioned in a BBC internal review, which claimed her guest appearances on Morning Joe and The Rest is Politics US podcast was a breach of impartiality, saying the shows "are widely regarded as partisan and regularly express strong opinions in favour of the Democratic Party".

Kay anchored coverage of US presidential election nights across all BBC platforms in 2016 and 2020, on both occasions presenting with Andrew Neil. In 2021, she anchored the BBC's coverage of the Presidential inauguration of Joe Biden.

On 24 June 2021, Kay announced that the night's broadcast would be her last for the BBC. She immediately joined Ozy Media, but resigned when she became aware of allegations that the company had engaged in fraud. It was announced in March 2022 that Kay would return to the BBC as US Special Correspondent for BBC Studios, working across documentaries, podcasts and news, as well as US Election Night anchor. In 2026, the BBC said that Kay had broken its impartiality rules by referring to the Gaza genocide on The Rest is Politics: US podcast.

== Personal life ==
In 1989, Kay married journalist and author Sebastian Mallaby; the marriage ended in divorce. She later married Tom Carver in 1999, an ex-BBC reporter, head of global communications at the Carnegie Endowment for International Peace and grandson of Field Marshal Bernard Montgomery.

Kay has four children, two from each marriage. She lives in the Georgetown neighbourhood of Washington, D.C. In 2021, she became a Swiss citizen; her father, who died in January 2021, was Swiss.

== Works ==
- Shipman, Claire; Kay, Katty (2 June 2009). Womenomics. HarperBusiness. ISBN 978-0-06-169718-0.
- Kay, Katty; Shipman, Claire. The Confidence Code: The Science and Art of Self-Assurance—What Women Should Know. ISBN 006223062X.
