= The Carlos Watson Show =

American talk show

- Official logo
- Genre: talk show
- Presented by: Carlos Watson
- Country of origin: United States
- Original language: English
- No. of episodes: 121

Production
- Camera setup: Multiple
- Running time: 30 minutes
- Production company: Ozy Media

Original release
- Network: YouTube
- Release: August 2, 2020 – February 18, 2021
- Network: Amazon Prime
- Release: May 22 – July 21, 2021

The Carlos Watson Show is an American talk and interview series hosted by journalist and entrepreneur Carlos Watson. The program premiered in 2020 and features long-form conversations with political leaders, business innovators, authors, actors, musicians, athletes, and emerging cultural figures.

The series was executive-produced by Watson and OZY Media, with episodes filmed remotely and in studios in California and New York. Deadline reported that the show was developed using a pandemic-era digital production workflow that allowed for remote interviews and rapid episode turnaround. The show initially aired 119 episodes on YouTube from August 2, 2020, to February 18, 2021, and featured interviews with prominent figures from politics, science, and business.

An accompanying podcast version of the show is also available, featuring longer, unedited versions of each conversation. The show ended when a large controversy surrounding host and executive producer Carlos Watson and producer Samir Rao.

After a brief shutdown, it returned for a third season of 43 episodes on Amazon Prime from May 22, 2021, to July 21, 2021.

== Format ==
Conversations between host Carlos Watson as host and the guest take place entirely over Zoom, on account of the show launching during the COVID-19 pandemic. It was taped in Mountain View, California. The interviews are longer and more personal than typical talk show appearances, with a single guest discussing their journey to success and their take on current affairs over the course of a single 15-to-30-minute episode. The show weaves in archive footage and small tape packages about the episode's guests, acting as a deeper guest profile than the typical talk show appearance. Each episode typically ends with a "Rapid Fire" segment. The show has also broadcast two live specials: one on the evening of January 6, 2021 after the storming of the U.S. Capitol, and the second to mark the inauguration of President Joe Biden.

The show generated media coverage for several interviews. Pfizer CEO Albert Bourla revealed that former President Donald Trump had told him a COVID-19 vaccine "will help me" with the 2020 election. Anthony Fauci discussed how the COVID-19 pandemic compared to the AIDS epidemic and predicted a potential HIV vaccine breakthrough. Other widely covered moments included H.E.R. revealing she was once in a band with Kehlani and Zendaya, and Matt Damon discussing Ben Affleck's rekindled relationship with Jennifer Lopez.

== Guests ==
The program featured guests from politics, business, entertainment, sports, and culture. Public officials and political figures interviewed on the show included U.S. Vice President Kamala Harris, former U.S. Secretaries of State Condoleezza Rice and Mike Pompeo, former National Security Advisor H. R. McMaster, and members of Congress such as Ilhan Omar and Hakeem Jeffries.

Guests from business, technology, and media included Microsoft co-founder Bill Gates, investor Mark Cuban, LinkedIn co-founder Reid Hoffman, Airbnb CEO Brian Chesky, and Nasdaq CEO Adena Friedman. The series also featured actors and entertainers such as Matthew McConaughey, Scarlett Johansson, Matt Damon, Jeffrey Wright, and Chelsea Handler, as well as musicians and artists including Wynton Marsalis, H.E.R., Rick Ross, and Takashi Murakami. Athletes interviewed on the show included NBA players Grant Hill and C. J. McCollum, NFL quarterback Baker Mayfield, and WNBA players Aari McDonald and Chiney Ogwumike.

== Development ==
Watson said he was make a show that "meets the current moment with a strong enough combination of insightful conversation, flavorful and diverse guests, plus a bit of levity and entertainment.”

== Marketing ==
The marketing campaign for The Carlos Watson Show included billboards and posters in Los Angeles and New York that featured quotes with misleading attributions. An executive producer said the marketing was aimed primarily at potential investors and executives in television and advertising, rather than general audiences.

In addition to promotional efforts, the show was supported through brand partnerships arranged by OZY Media. Reported sponsors and partners included companies such as Coca-Cola, Target, Walmart, AT&T, Spotify, Chevrolet, JPMorgan Chase, and Discover. GroupM signed a two-year preferred partnership, and Dentsu entered into a multi-year agreement as part of its investment in what it described as “meaningful media.”

== Reception ==
=== Audience viewership ===
The show has received over 50 million views, and the Carlos Watson Show YouTube channel has received over 70,000 subscribers as of March 2021. However, during the controversy, The New York Times spoke to an expert who said the numbers may have been artificially boosted.

=== Critical response ===
Essence described the show as featuring "energetic and informative conversations with some of the biggest names in sports, entertainment, and politics". People Now described the show as featuring "long-form, wide-ranging interviews with even wider-ranging celebrities". Good Morning America announced the show as "the fastest-growing talk show in YouTube history," but the New York Times later called those claims dubious.

The New York Times’s media critic has noted multiple examples of misleading or unverifiable marketing associated with Ozy Media, such as advertisements claiming that The Carlos Watson Show was the “first talk show” on Amazon Prime Video, a claim that Ozy withdrew after Amazon complained that it violated its promotion guidelines.

== Controversy ==
During production, Watson and OZY Media chief operating officer Samir Rao represented to staff and prospective guests that the program would air on A&E, though no such arrangement existed. The show was ultimately uploaded as standard YouTube videos. An analysis by Tubular Labs found viewership patterns suggesting paid view boosting. Watson was later tried for elements related to OZY Media's fundraising practices.

== Episodes ==
=== Season one (August 2020 – November 2020) ===
Season one of The Carlos Watson Show premiered on July 5, 2016, uploaded to YouTube.

No. overall	No. in season	Title	Original release date
1	1	"Karen Bass: The Next Speaker of the House?"	August 2, 2020
2	2	"Will Terry Crews Apologize for *Those* Tweets?"	August 3, 2020
3	3	"Will Andrew Yang Be Secretary of Commerce in Joe Biden's Cabinet?"	August 5, 2020
4	4	"How Sean Spicer Really Feels About BLM, Trump + 2020"	August 6, 2020
5	5	"Malcolm Gladwell's Surprising Solutions for Racial Harmony"	August 10, 2020
6	6	"David Oyelowo: Are Nigerian-Brits Taking Over the World?"	August 11, 2020
7	7	"Maggie Siff: Meet the Next Meryl Streep"	August 12, 2020
8	8	"Meet Tina Knowles-Lawson: The Queen-Maker Behind Beyoncé"	August 13, 2020
9	9	"Baker Mayfield: The Beauty of "Locker Room Talk""	August 14, 2020
10	10	"Meet the Democrats' Black Female Power Brokers"	August 17, 2020
11	11	"Why George Lopez Pissed Off the Secret Service"	August 18, 2020
12	12	"How Queer Eye's Karamo Went from Crazy to Compassionate"	August 19, 2020
13	13	"Could Grant Hill Have Been Better Than Michael Jordan?"	August 20, 2020
14	14	"Jamaal Bowman: Is He the Next AOC?"	August 24, 2020
15	15	"Hot Takes on the Future Economy from CNBC's Andrew Ross Sorkin"	August 26, 2020
16	16	"Roxane Gay Is Still Fighting. Are You?"	August 27, 2020
17	17	"The Real Legend Behind John + Chrissy"	August 28, 2020
18	18	"Tomi Lahren: America Isn't as Racist as You Think"	August 31, 2020
19	19	"Beto O'Rourke: Should Trump Be Prosecuted When He Leaves Office?"	August 18, 2020
20	20	"Bethenny Frankel: The Reality Star Who Sold Her Company for $100M"	September 1, 2020
21	21	"Why Business Mogul Tan France Tried to Quit Queer Eye"	September 2, 2020
22	22	"After Playing 14 Characters at Once, Who Is the Real Tatiana Maslany?"	September 3, 2020
23	23	"If Jeb Were President: Racial Reconciliation + UBI?"	September 4, 2020
24	24	"Pete Buttigieg Fears Democracy is Crumbling. Here's Why"	September 8, 2020
25	25	"How Avoiding Spankings Turned Tichina Arnold Into a Comedy Queen"	September 10, 2020
26	26	"Will Terry Crews Apologize for *Those* Tweets?"	August 3, 2020
27	27	"Why Anita Hill Still Believes in the Supreme Court"	September 14, 2020
28	28	"Gabrielle Union Wants to Defund the Police ... in L.A.'s Finest"	September 15, 2020
29	29	"Top Chef's Tom Colicchio Talks ADHD, COVID, Drugs and Bourdain"	September 16, 2020
30	30	"Can Charles Booker Inherit John Lewis' Legacy?"	September 17, 2020
31	31	"Can Rising Star Comedian Aida Rodriguez Bring Americans Together?"	September 21, 2020
32	32	"Has Cory Booker's Love Affair Changed His Politics?"	September 22, 2020
33	33	"Padma Lakshmi Talks Power, Politics and Sex"	September 23, 2020
34	34	"Meet One of the Most Powerful Men in Media: Ben Smith"	September 24, 2020
35	35	"Adam Grant: How to Get Through the Pandemic with Good Energy"	September 25, 2020
36	36	"Meet the World's Most Powerful Female Investor: Afsaneh Beschloss"	September 28, 2020
37	37	"The Meaning of Life, With 'Good Place' Star William Jackson Harper"	September 29, 2020
38	38	"Houston Police Chief Art Acevedo Talks Ending 'Lawful But Awful' Policing"	September 30, 2020
39	39	"Ilhan Omar: Meet the Fighter Behind the Caricature"	October 1, 2020
40	40	"Gloria Steinem: What History Gets Wrong About Feminism"	October 2, 2020
41	41	"'Fame' Star Debbie Allen Talks COVID, BLM and Kobe"	October 5, 2020
42	42	"Meet Hollywood's Next Breakthrough Director - Oge Egbuonu"	October 6, 2020
43	43	"Can Simon Sinek Help Make Work Suck Less?"	October 8, 2020
44	44	"Susan Rice on What Trump Got Right - and Very, Very Wrong"	October 8, 2020
45	45	"How Al Sharpton Keeps Grieving Families Out of the Spotlight"	October 9, 2020
46	46	"Caitlyn Jenner: Why I Failed to Make an Impact in Trans Community"	October 12, 2020
47	47	"Netflix's New Star Filmmaker Will Make You Care About Gentrification"	October 13, 2020
48	48	"Chelsea Handler is a Liberal Elite, and Knows It"	October 14, 2020
49	49	"Lenny Kravitz on How to Stay Close with Your Ex"	October 16, 2020
50	50	"20 Celebrities Weigh in on the 2020 Dumpster Fire"	October 16, 2020
51	51	"Isabel Sandoval: Meet the Trans Filmmaker Who Came Out to Herself on Camera"	October 19, 2020
52	52	"Why Is Jeff Flake Optimistic About the Election?"	October 20, 2020
53	53	"Meet Finneas: Billie Eilish's Brother and the Brains Behind Today's Biggest Pop Hits"	October 21, 2020
54	54	"Joseph Gordon-Levitt: Activism Is in My Blood"	October 22, 2020
55	55	"Why Billionaire Mark Cuban Always Got Fired When Working for Others"	October 23, 2020
56	56	"Dear White People's Justin Simien on Blackness, Queerness and Greatness"	October 26, 2020
57	57	"Jalen Rose's Recipe for Greatness: Be a Little Crazy"	October 27, 2020
58	58	"Meet ESPN's Unlikely Rising Star Football Guru: Mina Kimes"	October 28, 2020
59	59	"How These Celebrities Learned to Dream Fearlessly"	October 29, 2020
60	60	"Ava DuVernay: "Justice and Storytelling Go Hand in Hand""	October 30, 2020
61	61	"Why These Theater Legends Want You to Get Out the Vote"	October 30, 2020
62	62	"How Christy Turlington Burns Became a Model Activist"	November 11, 2020
63	63	"The Secret to Greatness in Sports? Intelligence, Says ESPN's Mike Greenberg"	November 13, 2020
64	64	"Jameela Jamil on the Good That's Come from the Pandemic"	November 20, 2020

=== Season two (November 2020 – February 2021) ===
Season two of The Carlos Watson Show premiered on July November 23, 2020, uploaded to YouTube.

No. overall	No. in season	Title	Original release date
65	1	"Inside Presidential Transitions: Obama Advisor Valerie Jarrett on President-Elect Biden's Priorities"	November 23, 2020
66	2	"Why Saweetie Is the New Rihanna: Discover the Music Industry's Next Billion-Dollar Global Brand"	November 24, 2020
67	3	"New Girl's Lamorne Morris: There Can Be More Than One Black Actor in a Show"	November 25, 2020
68	4	"From Tupac to Deepak: Health Guru Deepak Chopra on How Hip-Hop Informs His Meditation"	November 30, 2020
69	5	"You Can't Cancel Kathy Griffin: Why the Troller-in-Chief's Stand-Up Comedy Keeps Getting Funnier"	December 1, 2020
70	6	"Free World Class Education for Anyone Anywhere: Sal Khan on the Powerful Theory Behind Khan Academy"	December 2, 2020
71	7	"Fashion Empress Kimora Lee Simmons Is Building Her 'Baby Phat' Brand to Last"	December 3, 2020
72	8	"Megyn Kelly: Black Lives Matter and MeToo Have Been Co-Opted by Activists"	December 4, 2020
73	9	"Garcelle Beauvais Reveals All: Jamie Foxx, the Search for a Soulmate and Sex Secrets"	December 7, 2020
74	10	"Bill Gates on the COVID Vaccine: It Will Only Make Us Stronger for the Next Pandemic"	December 9, 2020
75	11	"Ta-Nehisi Coates Shares the Inside Story of 'Between the World and Me' on HBO"	December 10, 2020
76	12	"Why Japan Hates Their Most Famous Artist, Takashi Murakami"	December 11, 2020
77	13	"Kurt Busch on How BLM Has Opened Up NASCAR to More Than Checkered Flags"	December 14, 2020
78	14	"Cari Champion + Jemele Hill Won't Stick to Sports: Former ESPN Hosts on Disrespect of Black Women"	December 15, 2020
79	15	"Rep. Maxine Waters on COVID, Trump, and Why American Racism is 'Hard to Digest'"	December 16, 2020
80	16	"CNN's Lisa Ling on Fertility: Why Aspirational Young Women Should Consider Freezing Their Eggs"	December 17, 2020
81	17	"American Idol's Jordin Sparks Reveals All on Love and Success for Christmas"	December 18, 2020
82	18	"'Ma Rainey' Star Glynn Turman Bares His Soul on Chadwick Boseman, 'Cooley High' + Life Lessons"	January 4, 2021
83	19	"Michael Barbaro: The Real Story Behind "The Daily", America's Biggest Podcast"	January 5, 2021
84	20	"LIVE Protesters Storm the Capitol: Town Hall Conversation ft. Art Acevedo, Padma Lakshmi and YOU"	January 6, 2021
85	21	"Sevyn Streeter: Iconic R&B Singer/Songwriter Serenades Carlos About 2020 and Love"	January 7, 2021
86	22	"Dr Fauci Weighs in on Vaccines, Lockdown Trade-Offs, COVID Communication ... and the Next Pandemic"	January 8, 2021
87	23	"Swizz Beatz and Timbaland Reveal Their Dream 'Verzuz' Matchup"	January 11, 2021
88	24	"Mariana Van Zeller's Trafficked Will Take You Behind the Scenes of the World's Biggest Black Markets"	January 12, 2021
89	25	"Lloyd Blankfein: Former Goldman Sachs CEO on Investing in Character and Why to Believe in Capitalism"	January 13, 2021
90	26	"Shazam Star Meagan Good on Faith, Motherhood and Life with Husband DeVon Franklin"	January 14, 2021
91	27	"CNN's Fareed Zakaria on Lessons for a Post-COVID World: The Next Crisis Could End Humanity"	January 15, 2021
92	28	"Is Jason Derulo's TikTok Game the Start of a Hollywood Career?"	January 18, 2021
93	29	"Ex-CIA Director John McLaughlin Suspects Russian Interference at Capitol Hill Insurrection"	January 19, 2021
94	30	"LIVE: America United? Biden-Harris Inauguration Aftershow, Ft. Megyn Kelly, Christina Greer + YOU!"	January 20, 2021
95	31	"Bridging Divided America: Understanding the McCloskeys Beyond the St. Louis BLM Gun Standoff"	January 21, 2021
96	32	"BBC World News Presenter Katty Kay's Tips for Women in Power"	January 22, 2021
97	33	"I Did Not Come to Play with You Hoes: Big Freedia on Life, Love and Her Beyoncé Breakout"	January 25, 2021
98	34	"Adam Rippon: The Secrets Behind Olympic Success, His Relationship and ... a Future in Comedy?"	January 26, 2021
99	35	"We Asked 100 Celebrities to Reflect on 2020 - From COVID to BLM to the Life Lessons They've Learned"	January 27, 2021
100	36	"Hollywood Legend James Brolin Reveals the Blind Date That Led Him to Wife Barbra Streisand"	January 28, 2021
101	37	"NASCAR's Danica Patrick Admits She Never Loved Racing"	January 29, 2021
102	38	"Mad Money's Jim Cramer on COVID Stock Picks, Robinhood Investors, Tesla & Battles with His Temper"	February 1, 2021
103	39	"Boris Kodjoe Talks Love, Parenting and Entrepreneurship with Wife Nicole Ari Parker"	February 2, 2020
104	40	"Cynthia Bailey: From the First Black Homecoming Queen to RHOA Fame"	February 3, 2021
105	41	"Stand-Up Comedian Jo Koy on How His Filipino Heritage and The Tonight Show Helped Him Break Through"	February 4, 2020
106	42	"Meet the Educator Fighting to Fix America's Achievement Gap: Oliver Scholars CEO Dr. Danielle Moss"	February 5, 2021
107	43	"How a 'Moneyball' Campaign Approach Helped Madison Cawthorn Win"	February 6, 2021
108	44	"Daily Show Star Dulcé Sloan: There Are No Cheat Codes for Stand-Up Comedy Success"	February 9, 2021
109	45	"COVID Protests and Kidnapping Attempts Can't Stop Michigan's Gretchen Whitmer"	February 10, 2021
110	46	"Charmed Actress Alyssa Milano Talks COVID Symptoms, #MeToo, and Politics"	February 11, 2021
111	47	"Charmed Actress Alyssa Milano Talks COVID Symptoms, #MeToo, and Politics"	February 12, 2021
112	48	"Republican Strategist Alex Castellanos Predicts the 2024 GOP Nominee"	February 16, 2021
113	49	"Kenya Moore on Juggling Being a Mom, Entrepreneur and Real Housewife"	February 17, 2021
114	50	"Viral Musician Marc Rebillet on Collaborations with Snoop Dogg and T-Pain"	February 18, 2021
115	51	"How Basketball Superstar CJ McCollum Fought His Way from Lehigh to the NBA"	February 19, 2021
116	52	"Congresswoman Katie Porter on Her January 6th Close Call"	February 23, 2021
117	53	"The Lucas Brothers on Brotherhood, Comedy and Their Upcoming Film, Judas and the Black Messiah"	February 24, 2021
118	54	"Heather McGhee"	February 25, 2021
119	55	"Black History Month Clips"	February 26, 2021

=== Season three (May 2021 – July 2021) ===
Season three of The Carlos Watson Show premiered on May 22, 2021, and ran through July 21, 2021.

No. overall	No. in season	Title	Original release date
120	1	TBA	May 22, 2021
