= Ozy Media =

US international media and entertainment company

- Tagline: Live Curiously
- Type: Private
- Industry: Mass media; Entertainment
- Founded: September 2013; 13 years ago
- Founders: Carlos Watson (co-founder and CEO); Samir Rao (co-founder and COO)
- Defunct: March 1, 2023; 3 years ago
- Fate: Shut down after multiple fraud charges
- Headquarters: Mountain View, California, U.S.
- Website: www.ozy.com

Ozy Media (styled as OZY) was an American media and entertainment company launched in September 2013 by Carlos Watson and Samir Rao. It was headquartered in Mountain View, California, with an additional office in New York City.

On September 27, 2021, The New York Times reported a series of scandals at Ozy involving fraud and executive misbehavior. On October 1, after significant negative media attention, Ozy's board of directors announced that the company would cease operations. On October 4, Watson announced that the company would remain in operation with a significantly reduced board of directors.

The Department of Justice and the Securities and Exchange Commission opened investigations into the company. In February 2023 three executives, including both founders, were charged with fraud. Ozy ceased operations, and its website went offline, on March 1, 2023.

On July 16, 2024, Ozy Media and co-founder Watson were convicted of fraud at trial. Co-founder and COO Rao and chief of staff Suzee Han had pleaded guilty and cooperated with the prosecution. On December 16, 2024, Watson was sentenced to 116 months in prison.

In March 2025, President Trump commuted the prison sentence of Carlos Watson.

== History ==
=== Financing ===
Ozy was launched as a digital magazine and daily newsletter in September 2013. The company raised a $5.3 million seed round of funding in December 2013 backed by Laurene Powell Jobs, founder of Emerson Collective. Additional early investors included Louise Rogers and Ron Conway. Powell Jobs became a board member.

In October 2014, Ozy announced that German media giant Axel Springer had invested $20 million in the company. In January 2017, Ozy announced a $10 million Series B round of fundraising, led by Michael Moe's GSV Capital. In November 2019 Ozy announced a Series C round of $35 million, led by businessman Marc Lasry. Ozy also received funding from the Ford Foundation.

In January 2021, Watson said that the company had reached profitability for the first time. He stated that Ozy brought in $50 million in revenue in 2020. Several major news outlets questioned the legitimacy of these claims, and investors subsequently sued, alleging fraud and concealment. The company also said that it had received acquisition offers from unnamed media companies.

In March 2021, Ozy and Dentsu announced a multi-year partnership as part of Dentsu's investment in "meaningful media" focused on millennial and Gen Z consumers. In October 2021, Variety announced that such media-buying agencies were no longer willing to do business with Ozy in light of its duplicitous and alleged illegal behavior. WPP's GroupM, which makes buying decisions for advertisers including Ford Motor, Unilever and IBM, wrote in a statement, "We suspended all campaigns with Ozy Media on behalf of our clients … We have also terminated our agreement with Ozy Media at this time."

=== Partnerships ===
From OZY's launch in September 2013 until the summer of 2014, Watson (or sometimes authors of recent articles in OZY) appeared in a weekly installment of NPR's All Things Considered called "The New and the Next," in which he would lay forth on "People, places and trends on the horizon" appearing in OZY articles.

In 2014, the company announced a content syndication partnership with National Geographic. In 2015, Ozy had a newsletter partnership with The New York Times and Wired. Ozy claimed that these partnerships helped the company secure a number of new newsletter subscribers. However, Ozy employees allege that the company lied about the nature and success of these partnerships, stole email contacts from these partners, and violated data privacy laws throughout the duration of the partnerships.

In 2019, Ozy produced a television show that aired on the Oprah Winfrey Network and won an Emmy for Outstanding News Discussion and Analysis. That same year, the company produced a show for PBS that won an Imagen award for Best Informational Program.

In 2021, the company co-created a podcast with the BBC. It had 33 episodes, the last of which aired in April 2021. Ozy also partnered with Lifetime, The History Channel, and with the History Channel's channel's parent company A&E Networks.

=== Allegations of fraud and closure ===
On September 26, 2021, the New York Times reported that Samir Rao, COO and a co-founder of the company, had impersonated a YouTube executive on a conference call with Goldman Sachs. The meeting was an attempt to secure a $40 million investment. Goldman Sachs contacted Google, YouTube's parent company, and confirmed that no YouTube executives participated in that call. As a result, Goldman Sachs did not go forward with the investment. Google referred the matter to federal law enforcement. The New York Times report also discussed inflated traffic numbers, which BuzzFeed had reported on in 2017.

Following media coverage of Rao's impersonation, Ozy's board of directors asked him to take a leave of absence and announced that they had engaged the law firm Paul, Weiss, Rifkind, Wharton & Garrison to undertake a review of the company's business practices. Upon the company's relaunch, Watson said he doubted that the review would happen. Elsewhere it was reported that the board members who had requested the review were no longer with the company.

A number of prominent people and organizations distanced themselves from Ozy following the publication of the Times article. Television journalist Katty Kay, who had joined just three months prior, resigned from Ozy Media. SV Angel announced it would give up the shares it had acquired in Ozy in 2012. A&E canceled the broadcast of a documentary it had produced with Ozy. The company's chairman Marc Lasry resigned after three weeks on the job and said in a statement, "I believe that going forward Ozy requires experience in areas like crisis management and investigations, where I do not have particular expertise."

Shortly after the Times article was published, Sharon Osbourne responded to a request by CNBC to verify a statement Ozy CEO Watson had made in a 2019 interview with them that Sharon and Ozzy Osbourne, after having sued Ozy over infringement on their Ozzfest brand, "decided to be friends and now they're investors in Ozy." Osbourne denied that she or her husband had been investors, saying, "This guy is the biggest shyster I have ever seen in my life", adding that during their legal battle she had declined shares in Ozy that Watson offered her. On October 4, 2021, Watson said that he had described the Osbournes as investors because they had been granted shares of stock in Ozy as part of a legal settlement.

On October 1, 2021, Watson, who had just been re-elected to a second three-year term as a corporate director of NPR, resigned immediately before a governance committee was planning to meet to determine his future. The same day, Ozy edited its website to remove Samir Rao's staff page. The board announced the company's closure, saying, "It is therefore with the heaviest of hearts that we must announce today that we are closing Ozy's doors." A majority of the staff were laid off.

=== Relaunch ===
On October 4, 2021, Watson said that Ozy would remain active. In an interview on NBC's Today, he announced the company is open for business, saying, "This is our Lazarus moment, if you will, our Tylenol moment." The next day, LifeLine Legacy Holdings, a fund management company that invested more than $2 million, filed a lawsuit claiming Ozy "engaged in fraudulent, deceptive and illegal conduct." On June 13, 2022, the U.S. District Court for the Northern District of California dismissed LifeLine's lawsuit.

Axios noted the company would continue to face multiple issues in its attempted recovery, including investigations by the U.S. federal government and by outside law firms. They also noted that it remained unclear how much cash Ozy has on hand, and that the board of directors now includes only Watson and venture capitalist Michael Moe. The publication was skeptical about Watson's claims, noting that it was unclear how many employees still worked at Ozy and that Ozy's team page still listed "many people who are long gone" from the company.

Ron Conway, an early investor, was highly critical of Watson's decision to reopen. Conway said that he did not think the company should spend any money on a relaunch and that, instead, Ozy should have used its remaining cash to pay two weeks' severance to about 75 former Ozy employees. Conway subsequently surrendered his shares in Ozy and hired law firm Wilson Sonsini to represent the ex-employees in a suit against the company. In late November 2021, Ozy reached a severance settlement with most of its former full-time employees. It included final paychecks, requested reimbursements, accrued but unused PTO, and other owed wages such as commissions.

In November 2021, it was reported that the Justice Department and the U.S. Securities and Exchange Commission (SEC) had opened investigations into the company. Watson confirmed that he had heard from the SEC.

In February 2022, Watson tweeted a link to an article that quoted him at length and that described the future vision of "Ozy 2.0" without mentioning any of the controversies that had led to the original Ozy's closure. Vice World News observed that the article's author, "a journalist with the suspicious name of Hugh Grant", was depicted with a stock photograph. Tech Bullion, the news site that ran the Ozy 2.0 article, charged money for publishing articles, according to a reporter at The Information. Watson deleted his original tweet and followed up by tweeting, "I gave an interview. Shared all of the exciting things happening at OZY. I had the expectation the interview would be published in a mainstream business news outlet. It wasn’t and the author used a pseudonym. The content is all true. Great content, wrong delivery." The Tech Bullion article has since been deleted.

=== Fraud charges and second closure ===
On February 23, 2023, the Wall Street Journal reported that multiple Ozy executives had been charged with fraud. Samir Rao pleaded guilty to fraud charges in the United States District Court for the Eastern District of New York. Suzee Han, Ozy's former chief of staff, pleaded guilty to fraud conspiracy charges on February 14, and told a magistrate judge that she falsified financial information about the company at the direction of two unidentified executives. Carlos Watson was arrested and pleaded not guilty to fraud charges. Rao, Watson, and Ozy also face a civil lawsuit from the United States Securities and Exchange Commission, which alleges that the executives and the company lied to investors.

On March 1, 2023, Ozy posted on its Twitter account, "In light of its current operational and legal challenges, the Ozy board has determined that it's in the best interests of its stakeholders to suspend operations immediately." The company's web site became unreachable on the same day.

==== Conviction ====
On July 16, 2024, a federal jury in Brooklyn, New York convicted Ozy Media and Ozy founder Carlos Watson of conspiracy to commit securities fraud, conspiracy to commit wire fraud, and aggravated identity theft. Watson faces up to 37 years in prison. Two other Ozy executives, co-founder Samir Rao and chief of staff Suzee Han, had pleaded guilty and testified for the prosecution at trial. The 2021 meeting with potential investors, where Rao had impersonated a YouTube executive, figured prominently in the case.

== Content ==
Alternate Ozy logo related to some of their endeavors, a "ZY" enclosed in an "O"

Following the various allegations of fraud and illegal behavior in September 2021, the company ceased most all operations across its media channels. It ceased production of podcasts and videos but was reported to continue producing a newsletter.

=== Magazine ===
Ozy's digital magazine focused on profiles of rising stars and trends, often rehashing stories covered previously by other media without any original interviews or reporting. Reporters were given budgets as small as $150 per story and were instructed not to cover topics covered by other mainstream media outlets. This led to the publication of some articles focused on issues of very narrow interest.

In 2017, Ozy reporters visited all 50 U.S. states for a project called "States of the Nation." The year after that, Ozy produced a series called "Around the World" in which they committed to report on three stories in every country. CNN reported that both series were largely delivered as promised, although the latter grouped some smaller countries together.

=== Television ===
In 2016, Ozy's first television series, The Contenders: 16 for '16, aired on PBS. It later produced three additional series for PBS.

The four-part show Black Women OWN the Conversation aired in August and September 2019 on the Oprah Winfrey Network. The episode "Motherhood" won the Outstanding News Discussion and Analysis award at the 41st News & Documentary Emmy Awards in 2020. The show featured conversations with an audience of 100 black women.

In January 2020, Ozy announced a partnership with A&E Networks to co-produce at least two additional television shows. By September 2020, the number of titles announced under the partnership had grown to five, including two scripted shows, a dating show, and a re-editing of the company's first TV show, The Contenders, updated for the 2020 election.

In July 2020, Ozy announced The Carlos Watson Show, a new daily talk show focused on long-form interviews, which would be distributed on YouTube. Brad Bessey, executive producer of The Carlos Watson Show, told The New York Times in September 2021 that he had been misled to believe that the show would air in prime time on A&E when he was hired. Talent bookers provided similarly misleading statements to guests on the show. Bessey resigned after learning that the show would instead be produced by the company for YouTube distribution. In his farewell email to Watson and Ozy COO Samir Rao, Bessey wrote, "You are playing a dangerous game with the truth. The consequences of offering an A&E show to guests when we don't have one to offer are catastrophic for Ozy and for me."

=== Podcasts ===
Ozy produced several podcasts, beginning with history podcast The Thread in 2017, an episode of which was featured as one of the 25 best podcasts of 2017 by The Guardian. The company also produced a science and technology podcast The Future of X, and Ozy Confidential, an interview podcast.

=== Ozy Fest ===
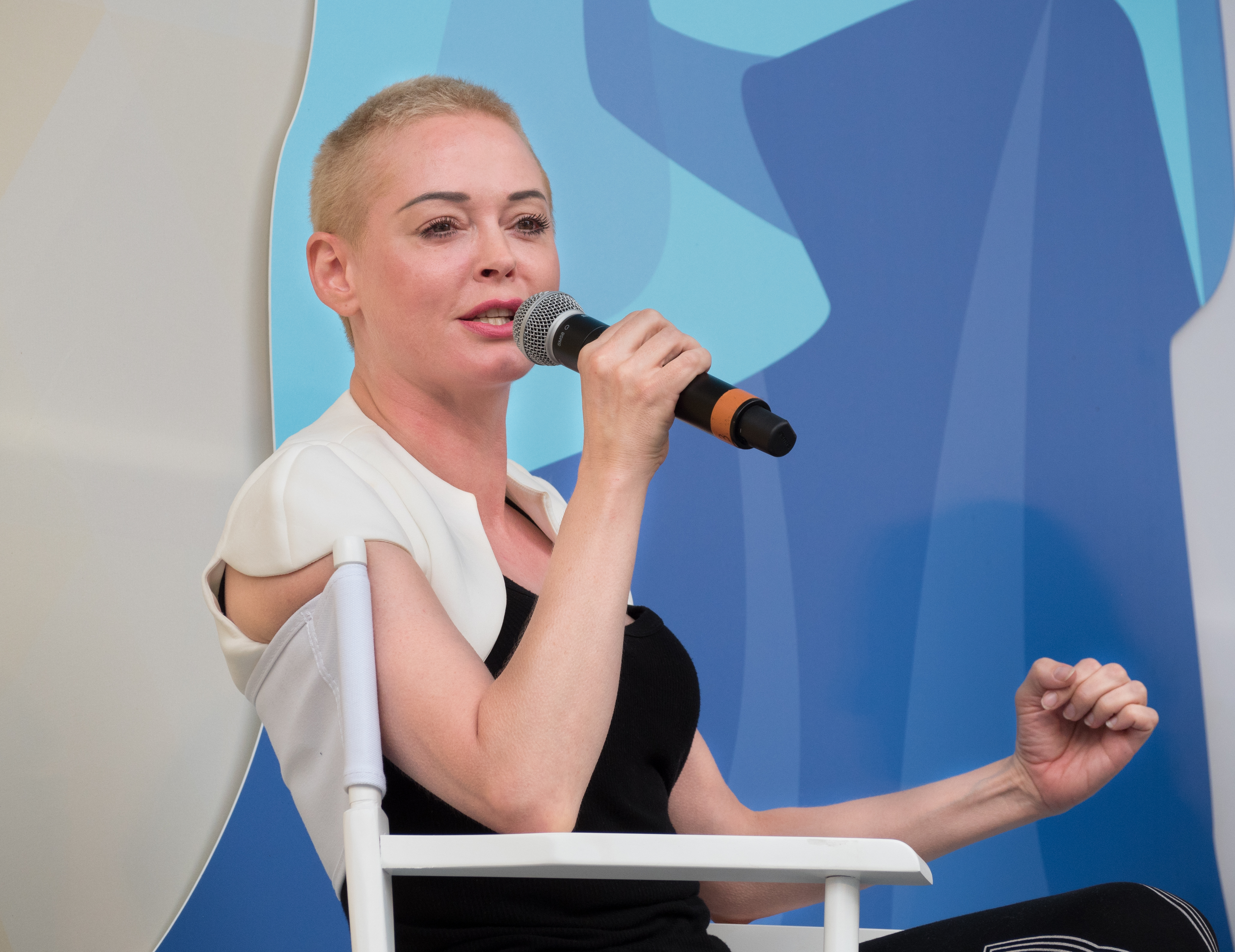
Actress Rose McGowan speaking at Ozy Fest 2018.

In 2016 an event dubbed "Ozy Fest" was launched, which until 2018 was held in Rumsey Playfield at Central Park in New York City. The name of Ozy Fest sparked a lawsuit from Ozzy Osbourne's Ozzfest in 2017. The festival featured appearances from Wyclef Jean, Issa Rae, Katie Couric, and others. Laurene Powell Jobs interviewed Hillary Clinton.

Ozy Fest 2019 was canceled, which was blamed on a heat wave. It later emerged that Ozy had been grossly inflating crowd projections and was ill-prepared for the event itself, with one employee saying "It was going to be Fyre Fest."

In 2021, Ozy Fest aired a two-day virtual event to raise funds for the United Negro College Fund.

=== Ozy Genius Awards ===
Ozy has hosted an irregular scholarship program since 2015, awarding 10 college-aged applicants with a $10,000 grant to pursue a "genius idea". Among the 2017 class of Ozy Genius Award winners was poet Amanda Gorman, who later rose to fame for reading "The Hill We Climb" at the inauguration of Joe Biden in 2021.

== Organization ==
Axios described Ozy as one of the few U.S. digital media companies that was founded and is run by a person of color. CEO Watson said, "More than half of our company is people of color, more than half of our leadership team is female." According to employees, Ozy demanded very long work hours and high output. Employee turnover was high; employees have described executives as mercurial and abusive.

== Reception ==
The Daily Telegraph described OZY as "a left-wing media company". Variety profiled Ozy favorably.

Ozy Fest 2018 was criticized as a "neoliberal nightmare" by Rolling Stone, a "sizzling hot festival for folks who love Coachella and neoliberalism" by GQ, and "a progressive alternate reality" by The Washington Post.
