= Kelly O'Donnell =

American journalist

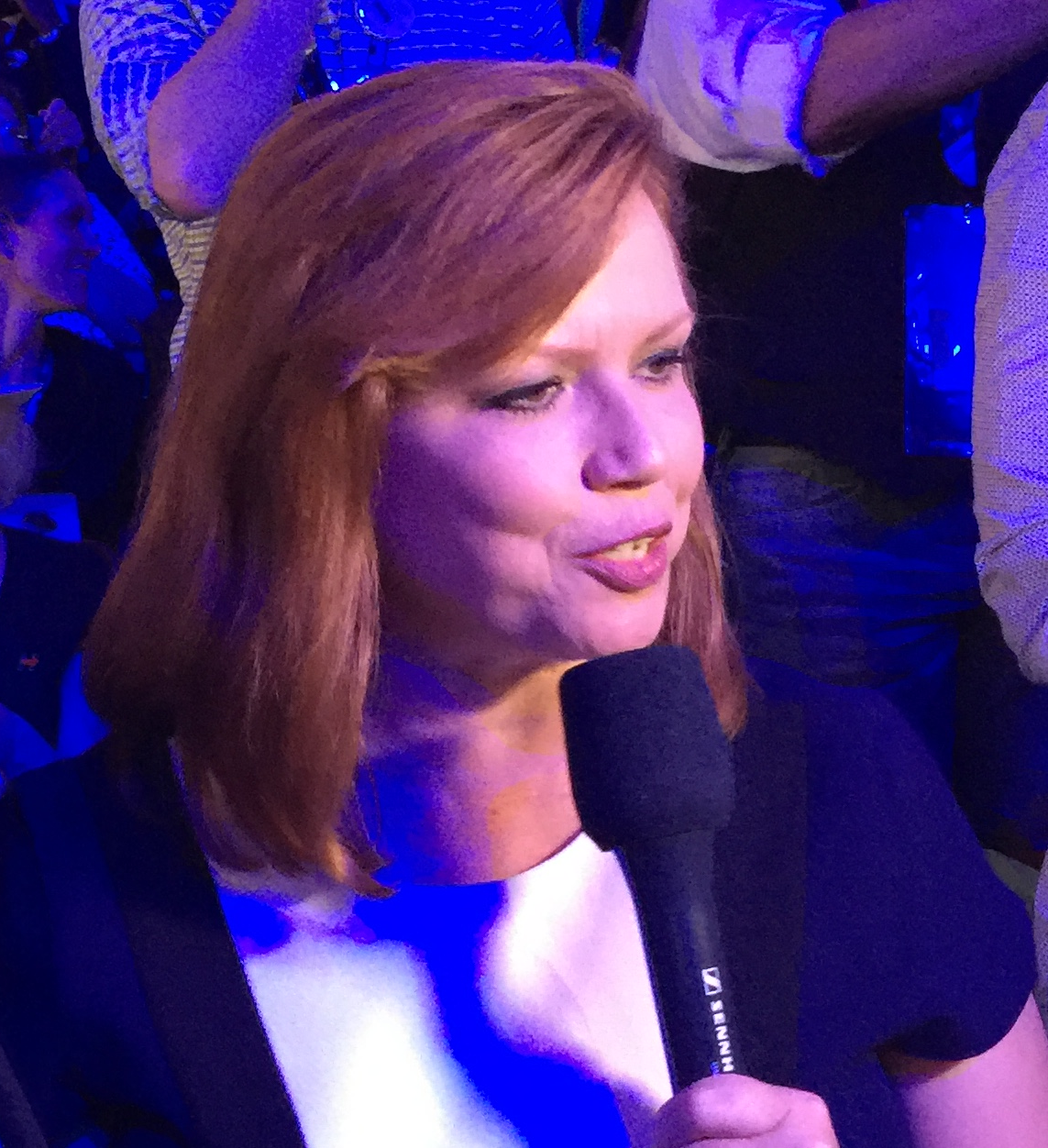
- Kelly O'Donnell reporting at the 2016 Democratic National Convention
- Born: May 17, 1965 (age 61); Cleveland, Ohio, U.S.
- Education: Northwestern University (BSc)
- Occupations: Journalist; Anchor
- Notable credit(s): NBC News anchor, NBC Nightly News correspondent
- Spouse: J. David Ake

Kelly O'Donnell (born May 17, 1965) is an American journalist. She is the chief justice and national affairs correspondent for NBC News covering the Justice Department. She appears on NBC Nightly News, Today, Meet The Press, and NBC News Now.

== Background ==
In 1987, O'Donnell graduated from Northwestern University with a Bachelor of Science in Education degree, focusing on a combined course of study in journalism and public policy.

In the 1990s, O'Donnell served as a reporter and anchor at WJW-TV in Cleveland, Ohio. At this time, O'Donnell worked with former NBC reporter Martin Savidge, when WJW was still a CBS station in Cleveland.

Beginning in 1994, O'Donnell followed a broad range of stories as an NBC News correspondent based in New York City and Los Angeles.

O'Donnell also appeared as a panelist on The Chris Matthews Show. She had served as news anchor and substitute host on the Weekend Today program and the weekend edition of Nightly News. She has contributed reports to the primetime news magazine Dateline NBC. She served as White House correspondent for NBC News during the second term of George W. Bush; following the 2008 presidential campaign season, she became Capitol Hill correspondent.

O'Donnell has covered the Bush administration, Congress, and several presidential campaigns.

In 2016, O'Donnell was the first to report live on television that Hillary Clinton had called Donald Trump over the phone to concede the presidential election.

During the Iraq war, O'Donnell was embedded with the 3rd Infantry Division, stationed in Baghdad and Qatar. In addition, O'Donnell has reported on a wide variety of events, including the Oklahoma City bombing (1995), the O. J. Simpson trial (1995), the September 11 attacks (2001), and the Space Shuttle Columbia disaster (2003). O'Donnell reported on the travels and death of Pope John Paul II. She has also covered both the summer and winter Olympic games.

== Honors ==
O'Donnell was inducted into the Cleveland Journalism Hall of Fame in 2011 and the Ohio Radio/Television Broadcasters Hall of Fame in 2004.

She has received the 2014 Alumnae Award and in 2010 the Alumni Merit award from Northwestern University. In 2017, O'Donnell was awarded the Northwestern Alumni Medal—the highest honor given by the Northwestern Alumni Association.

She has received many honors, including Emmy awards, a National Headliner award, a New Hampshire Primary Award for Political Reporting, and Los Angeles Press Club awards.

In 2021, she was elected president of the White House Correspondents' Association for 2023–2024.

== Personal life ==
Kelly grew up in Euclid, Ohio. She graduated Villa Angela Academy (later Villa Angela-St. Joseph High School), a Catholic school in Cleveland.

O'Donnell's grandparents on both sides came from Ireland and she maintains Irish citizenship. She is married to J. David Ake.
