= Center for Defense Information =

U.S. nonprofit organization

- Abbreviation: CDI
- Merged into: Project on Government Oversight
- Formation: 1971; 55 years ago
- Founder: Adm. Gene La Rocque, Adm. Eugene Carroll
- Headquarters: Washington, D.C., U.S.
- Director: Mandy Smithberger
- Website: www.pogo.org/center-for-defense-information/

The Center for Defense Information (CDI) was a nonprofit, nonpartisan organization based in Washington, D.C. It specialized in analyzing and advising on military matters.

== History ==
The Center for Defense Information was founded in 1971 by an independent group of retired military officers including Adm. Gene La Rocque and Adm. Eugene Carroll.

In 2005, the Center for Defense Information expanded by creating the Straus Military Reform Project for the purpose of promoting military reform in the Pentagon and Congress. Winslow T. Wheeler, a former Capitol Hill staffer and General Accounting Office assistant director, directs the Straus Military Reform Project at CDI. The Project was launched by a matching grant from Philip A. Straus Jr. Straus and his family have long supported activities at CDI and continue to be major supporters of the Project's endeavors. In May 2012, CDI joined the Project on Government Oversight.

After the 2008 United States elections, CDI released America’s Defense Meltdown: Pentagon Reform for President Obama and the New Congress, a collection of briefing papers by a dozen defense intellectuals and retired military officers. In 2010, CDI released a second anthology, The Pentagon Labyrinth: 10 Short Essays to Help You through It. Since the mid-2000s, CDI has focused on the Lockheed Martin F-35 Lightning II as what it says is the embodiment of the Pentagon's acquisition problems—being both unaffordable and a huge disappointment in performance.

Formerly, CDI operated under the umbrella of the World Security Institute. In 2012, the World Security Institute closed, and CDI merged with the Project On Government Oversight (POGO). In addition, POGO continued the publication of The Defense Monitor.
