= Gene La Rocque =

United States Navy admiral (1918–2016)

Gene R. LaRocque
- Born: June 29, 1918; Kankakee, Illinois, U.S.
- Died: October 31, 2016 (aged 98); Washington, D.C., U.S.
- Burial place: Arlington National Cemetery U.S.
- Military career
- Allegiance: United States
- Branch: United States Navy
- Service years: 1940–1972
- Rank: Rear Admiral
- Conflicts: World War II, Korea, Vietnam
- Other work: Center for Defense Information

Eugene Robert LaRocque (June 29, 1918 – October 31, 2016) was a rear admiral of the US Navy. He founded the Center for Defense Information in 1971.

== Early life ==
La Rocque was born in Kankakee, Illinois, in 1918 and began his naval service in 1940. When the attack on Pearl Harbor was carried out, he was serving on the USS Macdonough. He participated in 13 major battles during World War II and worked for seven years in the Strategic Plans Directorate of the Joint Chiefs of Staff. In the Battle of Kwajalein, he was the first man to go ashore in the landings at Roi-Namur.

As a lieutenant commander, La Rocque was the commanding officer of USS Solar, destroyed on April 30, 1946, in an explosion in loading torpex at Naval Ammunition Depot, Earle (now Naval Weapons Station, Earle), New Jersey. Five enlisted men and one officer were killed, with 125 others wounded.

== Activism ==
He retired in 1972 and was disillusioned over the Vietnam War. La Rocque and his colleagues testified before the US Congress, frequently appeared in the media, and consulted many national and international political leaders.

In the 1980s, La Rocque founded a weekly public affairs television program, America's Defense Monitor. In 1974, he stated that in his experience, any ship that is capable of carrying nuclear weapons carries them and does not off-load them in foreign ports. That statement directly conflicted with the US Department of Defense's policy that it would "neither confirm nor deny" (NC/ND) on such weapons and sparked controversy in Japan, which has had a non-nuclear policy since World War II.

He was elected to the Common Cause National Governing Board in 1982.

He made an appearance playing himself as a news broadcast contributor in the 1984 made-for-TV drama Countdown to Looking Glass, a cautionary fictionalization of a potential escalation scenario towards worldwide nuclear war.

== Personal life ==
La Rocque had three children (John La Rocque, James La Rocque, and Annette La Rocque Fitzsimmons) with Sally Fox, whom he had been married 32 years before her death, in 1978. In 1980, he married Washington businesswoman Lillian Kerekes Danchik, who died in 1994, which left his two stepsons (Howard and Roger Danchik) from her first marriage.

== Death ==
LaRocque died in Washington, DC, at the age of 98. He is buried at Arlington National Cemetery.

== See also ==
- Center for Defense Information
