= Worldfocus =

- Genre: News
- Presented by: Daljit Dhaliwal; Martin Savidge
- Country of origin: United States
- Original language: English

Production
- Production location: New York City
- Running time: 30 minutes

Original release
- Network: American Public Television
- Release: October 6, 2008 – April 2, 2010

Worldfocus is an American newscast focused on international news and reporting. The newscast was originally anchored by Martin Savidge and later hosted by Daljit Dhaliwal. It was produced by WNET New York and distributed to U.S. public television stations by American Public Television. It ceased broadcasting on April 2, 2010.

== History and operation ==
The program launched on October 6, 2008, in many cases replacing BBC World News, which continued to air on some public TV stations; following the cancelation of Worldfocus, many of the stations that had dropped the BBC program have since resumed carrying it. Worldfocus was not part of the national PBS schedule and did not air on all U.S. public TV stations. Worldfocus was a "testing ground", and "important laboratory" for new digital production techniques.

The program uses a number of producers and reporters from a variety of international media sources. News stories and video segments are used from: ABC, Al Jazeera English, Asian News International, Australian Broadcasting Corporation, Channel 2 (Israel), Channel 10 (Israel), the Christian Science Monitor, Deutsche Welle, ITN, LinkTV, NBC News, The New York Times, NHK, and Rede Globo.

== Awards and changes to show ==
Worldfocus received Emmy nominations for its broadcast series Crisis in Congo, as "Best story in a regularly scheduled newscast", and 21st Century Africa, as "Outstanding feature story in a regularly scheduled broadcast". Crisis in Congo also won the 2009 Robert F. Kennedy Journalism Award in the international television category.

On the August 28, 2009, program, host Martin Savidge announced that Daljit Dhaliwal would be taking over his role, while Savidge would still host one week a month and have an opportunity to "step out from behind the desk." Savidge became a special correspondent (Dhaliwal's former role) for the show and served as host occasionally on Worldfocus.

== Cancelation ==
On March 8, 2010, Daljit Dhaliwal announced at the end of that night's program, that Worldfocus would cease programming on April 2, 2010. The Worldfocus official website cited "fundraising difficulties" as the reason for the program's demise. In fact, Worldfocus was several million dollars off its fundraising goals. Overall Worldfocus was very expensive to produce, and did not bring in the crucial viewer donations as BBC World News had reliably done for years before. Cutbacks, dismissal of personnel, and cancelation of other WNET programs were blamed on spending for Worldfocus, although WNET CEO Neal Shapiro denies this. Neal Shapiro said, "Given the economic environment we now face, it is not prudent to continue the broadcast at this time". Worldfocus failed to garner an audience above 300,000 people. WNET had planned Worldfocus to be the flagship program of an expensive new studio then under construction at Lincoln Center. The completed studio was later used for other programs. In April 2010 WNET started again airing BBC World News, the very program that Worldfocus had replaced in 2008.
