= Eugene Carroll =

US Navy admiral and disarmament proponent (1923–2003)

Eugene James Carroll, Jr. (December 2, 1923, Miami, Arizona – February 19, 2003) was a rear admiral in the United States Navy and deputy director of the Center for Defense Information. After his retirement, he became a vocal proponent of nuclear disarmament.

== Life ==
He joined the Navy in 1945. He served in the Korean War as a naval aviator and in the Vietnam War. Promoted to rear admiral in 1972, he commanded the USS Midway and a carrier group in the United States Sixth Fleet. He retired in 1980.

Afterward, he joined the Center for Defense Information. He became a knowledgeable source for nuclear disarmament. He is interviewed/featured extensively in the 1992 Academy Award-winning documentary The Panama Deception, discussing the U.S. position and tactics during the Invasion of Panama the week prior to Christmas 1989.

He graduated from George Washington University with an MA in international Relations.

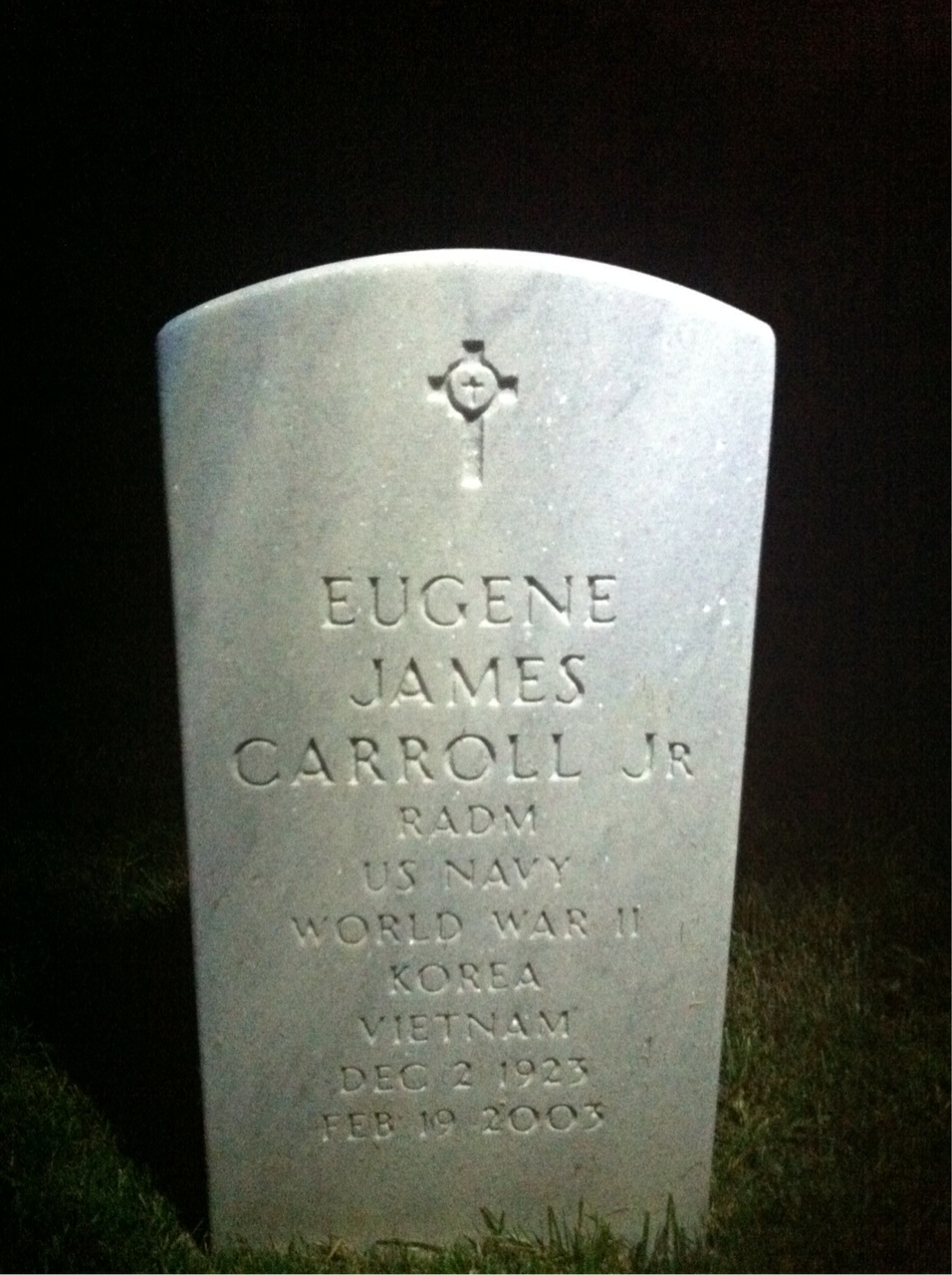
Grave at Arlington National Cemetery

Carroll died of a heart attack at Walter Reed Army Medical Center at the age of 79. He was survived by his wife Margaret and their son. He is buried at Arlington National Cemetery, Section 66, Site 7547.

== Works ==
- Jozef Goldblat; David Cox, eds. (1988). "Political, strategic, and psychological effects of a nuclear test ban". Nuclear weapon tests: prohibition or limitation?. Oxford University Press. ISBN 978-0-19-829120-6.
- Richard W. Fieldhouse, ed. (1990). "US Soviet Naval Competition: dangers and risks". Security at sea: naval forces and arms control. Oxford University Press. ISBN 978-0-19-829130-5.
- Joshua Cohen; Joel Rogers, eds. (2003). "Saddam and Democracy". Who defended the country?. Beacon Press. ISBN 978-0-8070-0457-9.
