= Daljit Dhaliwal =

British newsreader and television presenter

- Born: 8 September 1962 (age 64); London, England
- Education: University of East London; University of London
- Occupation: Television journalist/presenter
- Notable credit(s): Worldfocus; Foreign Exchange
- Website: hdreps.com/talent/daljit-dhaliwal.html

- Images
- September 25, 2006 in New York City
- August 1, 2000

Daljit Dhaliwal (born 8 September 1962) is a British newsreader and television presenter.

Dhaliwal is a former news presenter for the Al-Jazeera English news service that was broadcast from Washington, D.C. Previously, she was the anchor chair of Worldfocus on PBS, which aired its last broadcast on 2 April 2010. She has been best known for presenting the critically acclaimed program Foreign Exchange, also on PBS, and the United Nations Television produced 21st Century documentary seen on CUNY cable television. Dhaliwal also does news segments for ABC News Now. From January 2008 to October 2009, she was the sole anchor of Foreign Exchange. She later did one episode of Global Watch in April 2008. She had been previously working on and off as a newsreader for BBC World News since November 2005, mostly as a substitute for Katty Kay.

== Early life ==
Dhaliwal was born in London, England, and grew up in Southall, London. She earned a bachelor's degree from the University of East London, an MA degree in politics, history and economics from the University of London, and an honorary doctorate from the University of East London.

== Career with BBC and ITN ==
Dhaliwal started her career as a field reporter for BBC Home TV News, then became an anchor at ITN World News.

When ITN started the ITN World News she regularly presented the evening bulletins until the end of 2001. She presented with Andrew Harvey with each alternating each hour throughout the evening. Later in 2001, Dhaliwal's ITN World News broadcast was cancelled due to a lack of corporate funding (PBS switched from ITN World News to BBC World News which has late-breaking live broadcasts). She also was co-host of the inaugural season of PBS's Wide Angle in 2002. She returned as sole anchor in 2006, then left.

She had previously been a presenter, starting out for BBC Home News as a field reporter and then Channel 4 News. She left BBC Home to host ITN World News and Worldfocus, a news summary, on weekends.

== Move to the United States ==
Dhaliwal left London to work in Atlanta, Georgia, at CNN International and CNNfn. She became a temporary replacement newsreader on BBC World in November 2005 to substitute for Katty Kay who was on maternity leave. She had co-anchored primarily from WNET's studios on West 44th Street in Times Square, New York City, but usually reported from the BBC World News studios in Washington, D.C.

After that she moved to Atlanta, Georgia, wooed there by CNN International and CNNfn to host Your World Today. Dhaliwal has also worked for the United Nations and UNICEF, hosting important conferences in New York City and The Hague, Netherlands. She continues to work for the United Nations, presenting UNTV's award-winning monthly newsmagazine 21st Century.

For two seasons, Dhaliwal hosted Wide Angle from July 2006, but left to do her other shows and was replaced by reporter Aaron Brown. She hosted Foreign Exchange and Global Watch. Dhaliwal is currently a news presenter on Al-Jazeera English and ABC News Now, hosting a variety of programs for the digital network.

== Recognition ==
In May 1999, she was named one of People Magazine's "50 Most Beautiful People in the World" and in August 1999, Esquire Magazine placed her on their "Women We Love" list.

On 6 July 2000, after much anticipation on his part, David Letterman invited Dhaliwal to his show. Prior to her appearance, Letterman gushed during his shows about how beautiful he thought she was, took up the habit of chanting Daljit Dhaliwal, Daljit Dhaliwal every night, and would say how he would get his people to bring her to the show.
