= The Chris Matthews Show =

- Genre: News; Politics
- Presented by: Chris Matthews
- Country of origin: United States
- Original language: English

Production
- Production company: NBC News

Original release
- Network: First-run syndication
- Release: September 22, 2002 – July 21, 2013

The Chris Matthews Show was a half-hour weekend news and political round table program produced by NBC News. It was taped in Washington, D.C., and nationally syndicated by NBCUniversal Television Distribution. The program debuted on September 22, 2002 and its final episode aired July 21, 2013.

The program usually aired on Sunday mornings before or after the Sunday morning talk shows, usually on NBC affiliates, CW affiliates or their sister stations

The Chris Matthews Show also aired on WB affiliates from 2002 to 2006.

Chris Matthews served as the program’s moderator and was joined each week by a rotating group of four journalists. Either Andrea Mitchell or Chuck Todd, both of NBC News, would occasionally sit in for him.

Although Matthews was also the host of MSNBC’s Hardball with Chris Matthews, the two programs shared no common staff outside of Matthews or editorial input, besides being recorded at NBC’s Washington facility. The program converted to a high-definition presentation in April 2013.

On April 30, 2013, Matthews announced he would end the show to focus more on Hardball and writing books. The last show aired July 21.

== Program format ==
Each 30-minute program featured an opening roundtable-style discussion segment, usually on a major news story of the week; a second discussion segment often focusing on presidential politics and occasionally on cultural topics; a third segment called “Tell Me Something I Don't Know,” where the four panelists reported to Matthews new information they had gleaned from their reporting.

During the program, Matthews would “take a look at the Matthews Meter,” a survey taken by twelve of the show’s regular panelists. The question would generally be of the yes/no variety, such as “Who stands to be the better debater, President Obama or Mitt Romney?”

In 2007, the show introduced the segment “The Big Question,” in which Matthews asked the four panelists a Matthews-meter-type question. This segment closed the show.

== Regular panelists ==
Reporters who regularly appeared on the program included:

Andrea Mitchell, Kelly O'Donnell, and Pete Williams (NBC News); Gloria Borger (CNN); Katty Kay (BBC); Michele Norris (NPR); David Brooks, Helene Cooper and Elisabeth Bumiller (The New York Times); Clarence Page (Chicago Tribune); Major Garrett (CBS News); Gillian Tett (Financial Times); John Heilemann (New York); Howard Fineman (Huffington Post); Andrew Sullivan (The Daily Beast and Atlantic Monthly); Joe Klein (Time); Michael Duffy (Time); Kathleen Parker (Washington Post); David Ignatius (Washington Post); and Dan Rather (AXS TV).
