= Carlos Watson (journalist) =

American entrepreneur, attorney, television host and producer

- Born: September 29, 1969 (age 57); Miami, Florida, U.S.
- Education: Harvard University (BA); Stanford University (JD)
- Known for: Co-founding Achieva; Co-founding College Track; Co-founding OZY Media; Co-founding ROSE Media; The Carlos Watson Show; The Carlos Watson Podcast
- Awards: Emmy Award (2008, 2020); Signal Award (2026); Gracie Award (2008)

Carlos Watson (born September 29, 1969) is an American entrepreneur, journalist, television host, executive producer, and education advocate.

He has worked as a host and journalist for CNN, CNBC, MSNBC, PBS, and OWN. His programs included Conversations with Carlos Watson (Hearst Television), Point Taken (PBS), and The Carlos Watson Show (YouTube/Amazon Prime Video). He also executive produced Black Women OWN the Conversation for OWN. He has interviewed numerous public figures, including U.S. Presidents Barack Obama and George W. Bush, Prime Ministers such as Tony Blair, business leaders like Mark Cuban and Bill Gates, and other prominent figures across politics, business, and culture.

He co-founded College Track, a college completion program for underserved students, and Achieva, a college-access and test-prep initiative. Watson co-founded OZY Media in 2012 and served as its CEO. The multi-platform media and entertainment company produced television series, podcasts, documentaries, newsletters, festivals, and awards programs, with a focus on spotlighting emerging talent and underrepresented stories. Watson served on the Board of Directors of NPR from 2018 to 2021.

In 2026, Watson co-founded ROSE Media with Beverly Watson, Dr. Carolyn Watson, and investor Kosmo Kalliarekos. The podcast network and community platform launched with three original programs: From Behind This Chair, The Watsons: Stronger Together, and CARLOS, later renamed The Carlos Watson Podcast.

In October 2026, in a competitive field that included Oprah Winfrey, Michelle Obama, Scott Galloway, Jon Stewart, Amy Poehler and Mel Robbins, ROSE’s three inaugural programs collectively received five Signal Awards.

== Early life and education ==
Watson was born in Miami, Florida, one of four siblings raised by public-school teachers.

He graduated with honors from Harvard University with a degree in government. While in college, he worked as Chief of Staff and Campaign Manager for Florida Representative Daryl Jones, later managed Election Day operations for the Clinton–Gore presidential campaign in Miami-Dade County.

Watson earned his J.D. from Stanford Law School, where he served as an editor of the Stanford Law Review and president of the Stanford Law School Student Government.

== Career ==
=== Business career ===
After graduating from Stanford Law School in 1995, Watson began his career as a consultant at McKinsey & Company, working on strategy, education systems, and emerging markets. He later joined Goldman Sachs as a Managing Director, advising global clients in media, technology, finance, and consumer sectors. At Goldman, he conceived of and helped launch the firm's Builders & Innovators Summit, an annual entrepreneurship conference.

==== Achieva and College Track ====
In 1997, Watson founded Achieva, a college-access and test-prep initiative, Achieva served more than 100,000 students across more than 75 school districts, including New York City, Miami, Chicago, Los Angeles, and Washington, D.C. The initiative was featured in TIME, The New York Times, The Chronicle of Higher Education, and Stanford Lawyer for its pioneering model. Watson sold Achieva in 2002 to Kaplan, Inc..

Watson co-founded College Track with Laurene Powell Jobs in East Palo Alto in 1997. The program has since grown to serve thousands of students nationwide, and Watson has served on its nonprofit board.

=== Journalism and television career ===
Over more than two decades, Watson created, hosted, or contributed to programming across CNN, CNBC, MSNBC, BET, Hearst Television, PBS, BBC, OWN, A+E Networks, Hulu, Amazon Prime Video, and YouTube. His work has included news and political analysis, long-form interviews, documentary series, and debate programs.

==== Early television work (2002-2009) ====
Watson began appearing as a political analyst on Fox News and Court TV in 2002.

He joined CNBC in early 2003 as host of The Edge, and later moved to CNN where he appeared regularly as a political commentator and hosted the interview franchise Off Topic, which also ran as a political column on CNN.com. During the 2004 presidential election he also wrote CNN.com's main political column. In October 2004, Watson gave an exclusive interview with 2004 Democratic National Convention keynote speaker, then-Illinois U.S. Senate candidate and future U.S. President Barack Obama.

At BET, Watson hosted Meet the Faith, conducting long-form interviews on culture, politics, and spirituality.

In 2007, Watson created and hosted Conversations with Carlos Watson, a primetime interview series broadcast on Hearst Television stations nationwide. The show earned a Gracie Allen Award for "Outstanding Portrait/Biography Program" and an Accolade Award in 2007.

Watson was a founder and investor in The Stimulist, a daily blog that operated from mid-to-late 2009.

In 2009, Watson became a daytime news anchor for MSNBC, interviewing political, business, and cultural leaders. He co-anchored with Contessa Brewer and appeared across multiple shows, including Morning Joe.

==== PBS and streaming era (2016-2023) ====
In 2016, PBS announced Watson as the host of its new late-night debate program Point Taken. Watson also created and hosted several PBS programs including The Contenders:16 for '16 (PBS/BBC, 2016), Third Rail with OZY (PBS, 2017), Breaking Big (PBS, 2018), and Take on America (PBS, 2018). He later created Defining Moments with OZY for Hulu. (2020) Independent reporting and court filings during this period described OZY as having generated more than $250 million in partnerships and reaching a peak valuation of more than $2 billion.

===== The Carlos Watson Show =====
From 2020 to 2023, Watson hosted The Carlos Watson Show, a daily interview program distributed on YouTube and Amazon Prime Video, with additional audio distribution on Spotify and Apple Podcasts. It initially aired 119 episodes as a self-made show on YouTube. The show featured long-form conversations with over 300 guests spanning politics, business, entertainment, and culture. Notable guests included Presidents, Prime Ministers, Fortune 500 CEOs, and Nobel Laureates.

==== Emmy Awards ====
Watson is a two-time Emmy Award winner. His interview series Conversations with Carlos Watson (Hearst Television) won an Emmy Award, a Gracie Allen Award, and an Accolade Award for excellence in interview programming in 2007 and 2008. He also served as executive producer for Black Women OWN the Conversation on the Oprah Winfrey Network; the episode "Motherhood" won Outstanding News Discussion and Analysis at the 41st News & Documentary Emmy Awards in 2020. Watson was scheduled to present the documentary awards at the 2021 ceremony but stepped down.

==== NPR Board service ====
Watson was elected to the NPR Board of Directors in 2018 and re-elected to a second term beginning November 2021. He resigned in October 2021.

=== OZY Media ===
Under Watson's leadership, OZY grew from a digital magazine launched in September 2013 into a multi-platform media company producing television and streaming series, podcasts, newsletters, and live events. It also ran the OZY Genius Awards, which gave summer stipends to college students. Its programs included Black Women OWN the Conversation, Breaking Big, Point Taken, Third Rail with OZY, Take on America, and the podcast The Thread.

In 2019 and 2020, OZY held television deals with PBS, OWN, Hulu, and A+E Networks, with Watson fronting much of the programming. It also co-produced podcasts with iHeartMedia. In 2013 and 2014, Watson appeared in a weekly segment on NPR's All Things Considered called "The New and the Next," discussing trends featured on OZY.

OZY's advertisers included Ford, Target, and Walmart; several paused their campaigns in October 2021 after The New York Times reported on the company's business practices.

In October 2021, OZY's board announced that the company would suspend operations, but Watson reversed the decision days later and the company continued operating. Over the following eighteen months, OZY undertook a rebuilding effort, with former team members returning and production resuming across newsletters, television programs, podcasts, and awards initiatives. Its programming included Sneaker Fiends, The Rick Ross Car Show, the She-roics podcast, The Drop newsletter, and the OZY Genius Awards. OZY also reported reestablishing advertising relationships with major brands, including Coca-Cola, AT&T, and DoorDash. In February 2023, Watson presented OZY’s renewed programming and commercial plans to prospective advertisers. On March 1, 2023, the company announced another suspension of operations, citing “operational and legal challenges."

=== ROSE Media and The Carlos Watson Podcast ===
In January 2026, Watson co-founded ROSE Media, a podcast and media company, with Carolyn Watson, Beverly Watson, and investor Kosmo Kalliarekos. ROSE launched with three premium original programs: The Carlos Watson Podcast, The Watsons: Stronger Together, and From Behind This Chair.

Watson hosts The Carlos Watson Podcast, a video and audio interview series distributed across YouTube, Apple Podcasts, Spotify, and social and digital platforms. The program features long-form conversations spanning subjects including love and relationships, adoption and family, money and entrepreneurship, artificial intelligence, espionage and intelligence, health, culture, and public affairs.

The podcast continued the long-form interview tradition of Conversations with Carlos Watson and The Carlos Watson Show, bringing Watson back to regular interviewing as part of ROSE’s broader slate of original programming. ROSE has also developed partnerships across areas including health, finance, and education.

Within its first nine months, ROSE Media reported surpassing 100 million cumulative views across full episodes, short-form clips, and third-party distribution. In October 2026, its three inaugural programs collectively received five Signal Awards. In a November 2026 article, Grit Daily highlighted ROSE as an emerging Silicon Valley media company, reporting that it had secured more than a dozen advertising and affiliate partnerships, including repeat advertisers. The article also recognized ROSE’s award-winning programming alongside established podcast producers such as NPR, iHeartPodcasts, and Higher Ground Productions.

== Philanthropy, mentorship, and advocacy ==
=== Education and mentorship ===
The son of two public-school teachers, Watson has maintained a longstanding involvement in educational access, mentorship, and youth development. While attending Harvard, he volunteered at Boston English High School and participated in community outreach initiatives. During law school at Stanford, he helped establish a mentoring program for young people in East Palo Alto. He subsequently co-founded College Track with Laurene Powell Jobs, an organization dedicated to helping students from underserved communities prepare for and complete college. Over his career, Watson has spoken at more than 100 colleges, schools, and community organizations, including Stanford, and the University of Missouri, addressing entrepreneurship, leadership, media innovation, and educational opportunity.

== OZY Media legal case and resolution ==
In August 2019, BuzzFeed, led by CEO Jonah Peretti and then-BuzzFeed News editor-in-chief Ben Smith, began pursuing an acquisition of OZY Media. Smith initiated discussions between Peretti and Watson. In a September 16 email, Peretti described OZY as “the missing piece” and Watson as “the missing leader” in his vision for the combined company. On September 23, 2019, the companies signed a mutual nondisclosure agreement and proceeded with acquisition negotiations involving confidential business information.

According to OZY’s subsequent federal complaint, BuzzFeed pursued the transaction through extensive negotiations and due diligence involving senior executives and advisers. The complaint describes a series of escalating acquisition offers from late 2019 into early 2020, culminating in a package approaching $300 million — a $250 million purchase price plus approximately $30 million in incentives — along with a proposed presidency of BuzzFeed and board seat for Watson. Watson declined the transaction.

In September 2021, former BuzzFeed News editor-in-chief Ben Smith, then a columnist at The New York Times, published reporting examining OZY’s business practices, including an incident in which OZY executive Samir Rao impersonated a YouTube executive during a Goldman Sachs reference call. Watson disputed aspects of the reporting.

Smith had previously helped initiate BuzzFeed’s unsuccessful acquisition of OZY and continued to hold substantial BuzzFeed stock options as that company prepared for its December 2021 public listing. His financial interests and the adequacy of his disclosures subsequently drew scrutiny from Slate and FAIR. Duke University professor David Robinson initially estimated the potential value of Smith’s BuzzFeed options at approximately $23.5 million. The publications examined potential conflicts associated with Smith’s reporting on competing media companies and questioned whether his financial interests had been sufficiently disclosed.

OZY separately alleged that Smith had understated his role in the earlier acquisition negotiations and failed to disclose the full extent of his involvement and the confidentiality agreement. Smith had acknowledged holding BuzzFeed options and participating in acquisition discussions, but characterized his involvement as peripheral.

On February 23, 2023, Watson was indicted on business related charges, shortly after OZY co-founder Samir Rao pleaded guilty to fraud. Prosecutors alleged that OZY had misrepresented financial results and audience metrics to investors and lenders. Watson denied wrongdoing. On March 1, 2023, OZY announced that it was suspending operations.

In December 2023, OZY Media filed a federal lawsuit against Smith, BuzzFeed, and Semafor, the media company Smith subsequently co-founded. The complaint alleged that Smith had understated his involvement in BuzzFeed’s earlier acquisition negotiations and that confidential business information obtained during the process had been improperly used in developing Semafor.

OZY also alleged that Smith’s continuing financial interests in BuzzFeed presented a potential conflict during his 2021 reporting, as BuzzFeed was preparing for its public listing and OZY was pursuing a substantial financing round. According to OZY and its attorneys, the company was exploring financing at an anticipated valuation of approximately $2 billion, with JPMorgan Chase involved in discussions.

The lawsuit alleged misappropriation of trade secrets and breach of the parties’ nondisclosure agreement. OZY voluntarily discontinued the lawsuit in July 2024 without a judicial determination of its allegations.

=== Trial, challenges to the proceedings, and appeal ===
The case went to trial in the U.S. District Court for the Eastern District of New York in 2024 before Judge Eric R. Komitee. In July 2024, a federal jury found against Watson and OZY on the business-related charges. Watson maintained that he had committed no wrongdoing and subsequently challenged both the result and significant aspects of the proceedings.

Watson's defense team, led by Harvard Law Professor Ronald S. Sullivan Jr. and including former Massachusetts judge Shannon Frison, criticized the presiding judge's conduct during the trial, as did startup expert and defense expert witness Duke University Professor David T. Robinson and some courtroom observers. After the judge's 2023 financial disclosure became public in October 2024, the defense moved for his disqualification, arguing that hedge-fund holdings gave him financial stakes in four companies that prosecutors described as victims, and also challenged the jury instructions. The judge had cleared himself of any conflict at the outset of the trial, and prosecutors opposed the motions. On November 19, 2024, Judge Komitee declined to step aside, rejecting the challenge as meritless. Supporters of Watson released a documentary examining the trial, The Troubling Case of Carlos Watson: Whose Son Is Next?, on YouTube in November 2024.

=== Executive clemency, SEC resolution, and appeal ===
In March 2025, President Donald Trump commuted his sentence and the probation sentence imposed on OZY Media. The commutations came with no further fines, restitution, or other conditions. On September 18, 2025, the Securities and Exchange Commission dismissed with prejudice its civil enforcement action against Watson and OZY bringing the agency’s civil case to a definitive close.

Duke University finance professor David T. Robinson, an internationally recognized expert in entrepreneurial finance who testified for Watson’s defense, offered a forceful critique of the prosecution and trial proceedings. In his November 2024 article, “Conflict, Bias, and the Railroading of Carlos Watson,” Robinson argued that OZY was a genuine, valuable, and innovative Emmy Award-winning media company that Watson had built from the ground up. He pointed to its more than 200 major clients, including Coca-Cola, Target, and Walmart, and nearly 1,000 full-time and freelance contributors, approximately ninety percent of whom were women or people of color. Robinson characterized the prosecution as having destroyed a thriving Black-owned business and described the treatment of Watson as profoundly unjust. Drawing on his firsthand experience as a defense expert, he alleged that judicial financial conflicts, questionable jury instructions, and the treatment of defense witnesses had undermined the fairness of the proceedings. He also raised concerns about former BuzzFeed News editor-in-chief Ben Smith’s financial interests in BuzzFeed, which had previously pursued OZY as an acquisition target, and the disclosures accompanying Smith’s reporting. Robinson called for greater accountability in the judiciary and media, warning about the damage that conflicts of interest and unfair proceedings can inflict on entrepreneurs and their companies.

Harvard Law School professor Ronald S. Sullivan Jr., who led Watson’s defense, also publicly challenged the prosecution and its treatment of Watson and OZY. In an article titled “What Is It About a Successful Black Entrepreneur That So Threatens the Establishment?”, Sullivan examined the case in the context of racial bias, the treatment of successful Black entrepreneurs, and broader concerns about fairness and accountability in the American legal system.

Watson has continued to maintain his innocence, characterizing the case as a deeply troubling wrongful prosecution and calling for greater fairness, accountability, and transparency in the legal system, particularly in protecting individuals and entrepreneurs from injustice and strengthening public confidence in the rule of law. Following his commutation, Watson resumed his work in media, entrepreneurship, and mentorship, helping launch ROSE Media in January 2026 and co-founding The Athena Group, a fellowship focused on developing the next generation of young leaders. His continued professional and mentoring activities have emphasized creativity, opportunity, resilience, and service to others.

== See also ==
- List of people granted executive clemency in the second Trump presidency
