= Foreign Exchange (PBS TV program) =

- Also known as: Foreign Exchange with Daljit Dhaliwal
- Genre: International relations
- Presented by: Fareed Zakaria (2005–2007); Daljit Dhaliwal (2008–2009)
- Country of origin: United States
- Original language: English
- No. of seasons: 6

Production
- Executive producer: Bruce G. Blair
- Running time: 26 minutes

Original release
- Network: PBS
- Release: April 1, 2005 – October 9, 2009

Foreign Exchange (previously Foreign Exchange with Fareed Zakaria) is an American weekly, half-hour international affairs program that aired on the Public Broadcasting Service (PBS) public television stations. The program premiered on April 1, 2005, and for three seasons was hosted by author and journalist Fareed Zakaria. Beginning in January 2008, journalist Daljit Dhaliwal became the new host and the title of the program was changed accordingly. The program explores current international issues in conversations with journalists, politicians, and other newsmakers, and examines America's role in an increasingly globalized world. The final episode aired October 9, 2009.

== Production ==
The program was produced by Azimuth Media and Oregon Public Broadcasting, and was distributed by American Public Television. Major funding was provided by the William and Flora Hewlett Foundation. Additional support from the Ford Foundation and Carnegie Corporation of New York.

Through a partnership with the citizen journalism website Helium.com, the program offered viewers an opportunity to get their voices heard on the most pressing global issues. The issues were chosen by Foreign Exchange and ranged from Kosovo as an inspiration to other independence movements in the world to the future of socialism in Latin America. Essays were written and rated on Helium.com, and the best essays were featured on the show.

== See also ==
- Fareed Zakaria GPS, CNN program hosted by Zakaria since 2008
