= Chef Geoff's =

Restaurant chain

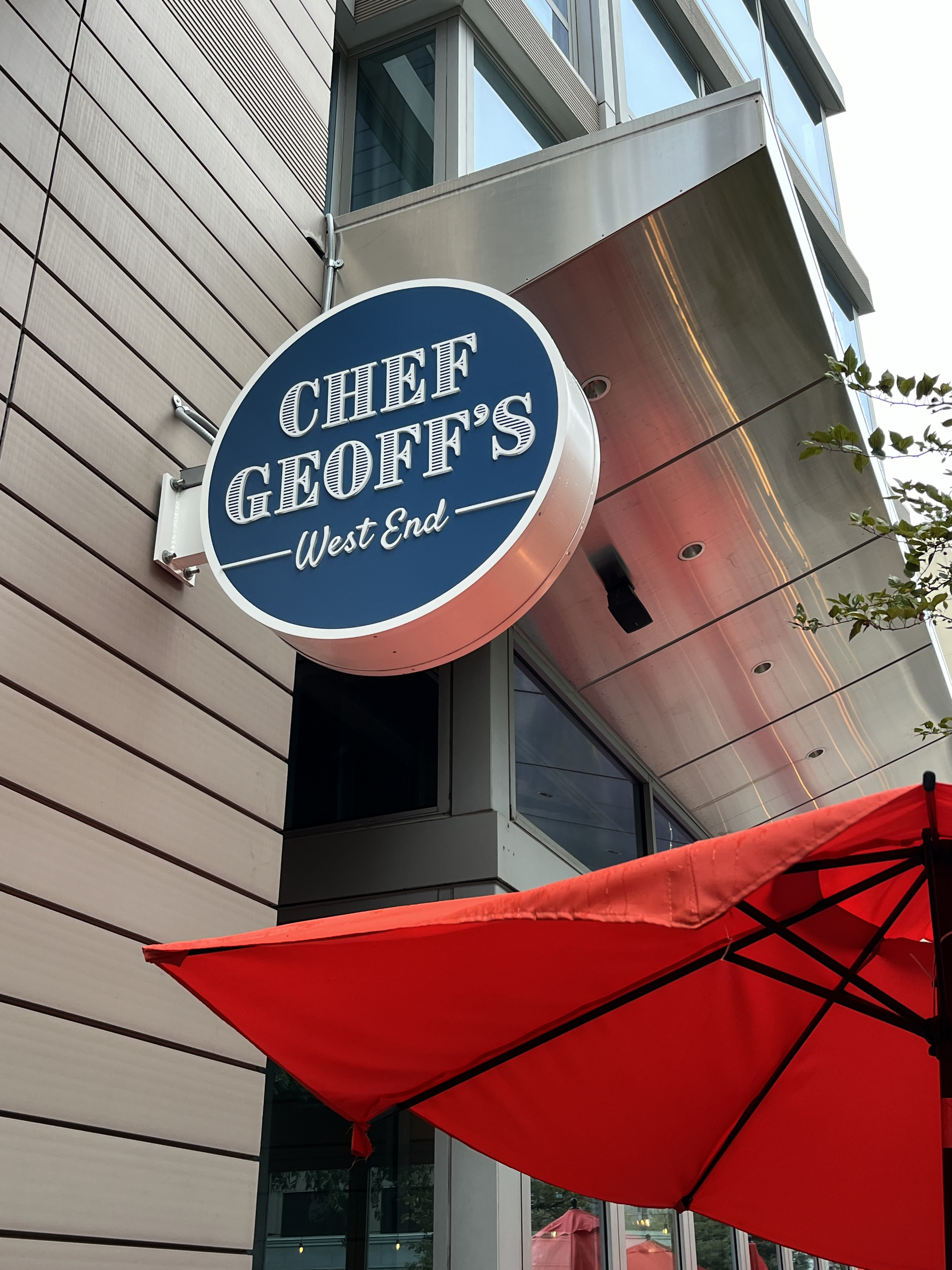
- Exterior sign for the West End location, 2024
- Interactive map of Chef Geoff's

Restaurant information
- Established: 2000
- Owner: Geoff Tracy
- Head chef: Geoff Tracy
- Food type: American
- Dress code: Casual
- Location: 3201 New Mexico Ave NW, Washington, D.C., 20037, United States
- Coordinates: 38°55′59.5″N 77°05′05.3″W
- Other locations: Lia's Restaurant; Chef Geoff's West End
- Website: chefgeoff.com

Chef Geoff's is a small chain of restaurants based in Washington, D.C., United States.

== History ==
The Rockville location opened in 2012.

== Reception ==
Todd Kliman of Washingtonian magazine wrote, "Look, I've eaten at a Chef Geoff’s probably 25 times, and of those 25 perhaps 3-4 of those meals were only okay. It nearly always hits its mark. And you can usually expect good service and a good atmosphere. CG's is like a double. It'll never be a homerun. It's not trying to be."
