= C.R. Howard House =

- C. R. Howard House
- U.S. National Register of Historic Places
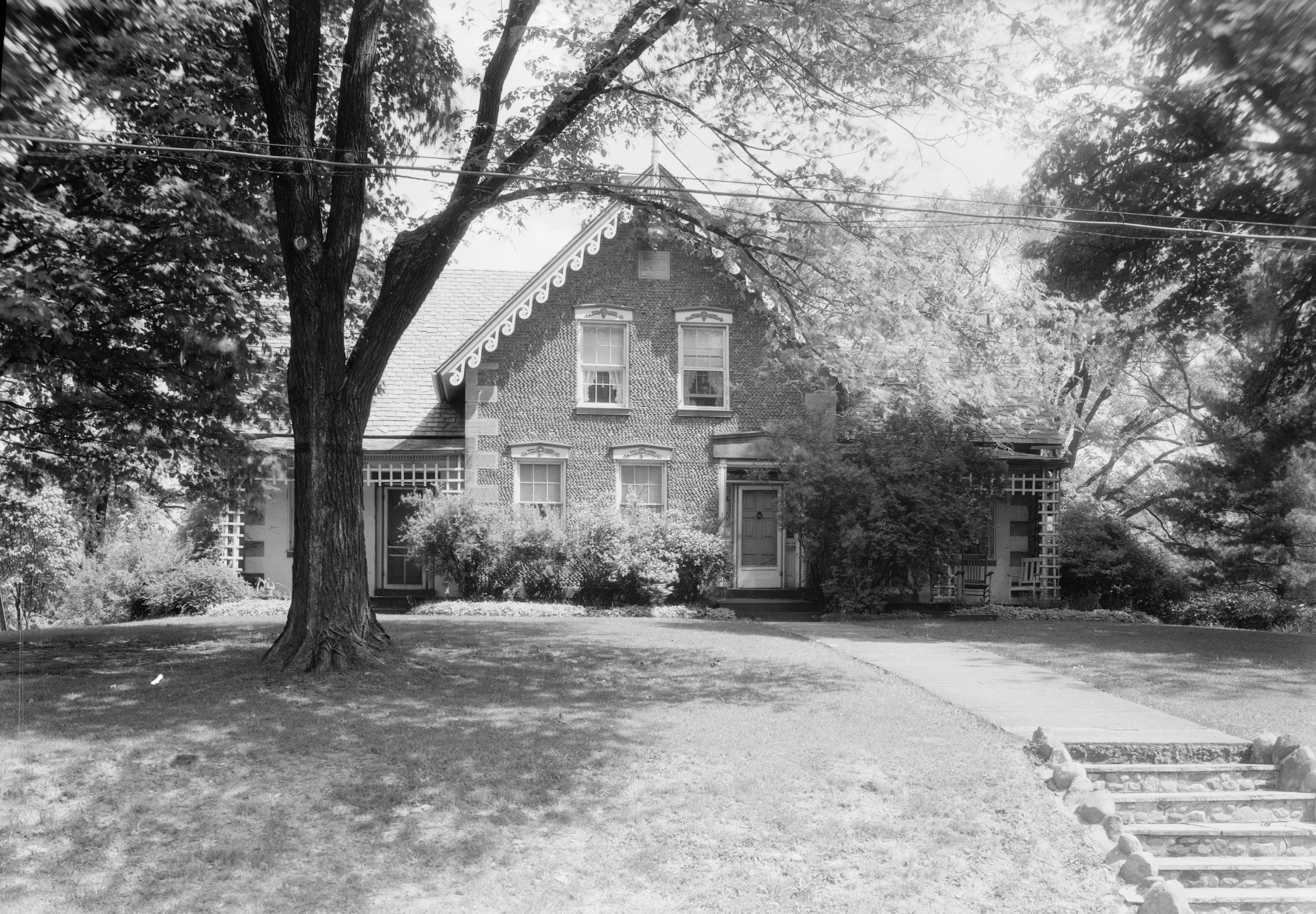

- Location within Ohio Location within the United States
- Location: 411 E. Garfield St., Aurora, Ohio
- Coordinates: 41°19′04″N 81°19′51″W
- Area: less than one acre
- Built: 1853
- Built by: M. Smith
- Architectural style: Cobblestone, Greek Revival, Gothic Revival
- NRHP reference No.: 74001602
- Added to NRHP: August 13, 1974

The C. R. Howard House, at 411 E. Garfield St. in Aurora, Ohio is a historic cobblestone architecture house built in 1853. It was listed on the National Register of Historic Places in 1974.

It is located on the Chagrin River at a former settlement known as Aurora Depot, half a mile from Aurora Center.

It is a two-story house built by an M. Smith for sawmill owner C.R. Howard. Its walls are faced with stone cobbles, and it has stone quoins. It has a steep gable on its front with eaves decorated by scroll-sawn vergeboard, topped by an octagonal pinnacle and pendant.

This house is believed to be the only example of cobblestone architecture within the Western Reserve area, although it was fairly common in western New York state at that time, and was spreading west through Ohio, Illinois and Wisconsin,

It includes aspects of Greek Revival and Gothic Revival style.
