= Beechmont =

Beechmont may refer to several places:

- Beechmont, Queensland in Australia
- Beechmont, Nova Scotia in Canada

United States

- Beechmont, Louisville in Kentucky
- Beechmont, Muhlenberg County, Kentucky
- Beechmont, New York (also known as Beechmont Knolls and Beechmont Woods) in New Rochelle
- Beechmont Country Club in Orange, Ohio
