= Jericka Duncan =

American television journalist

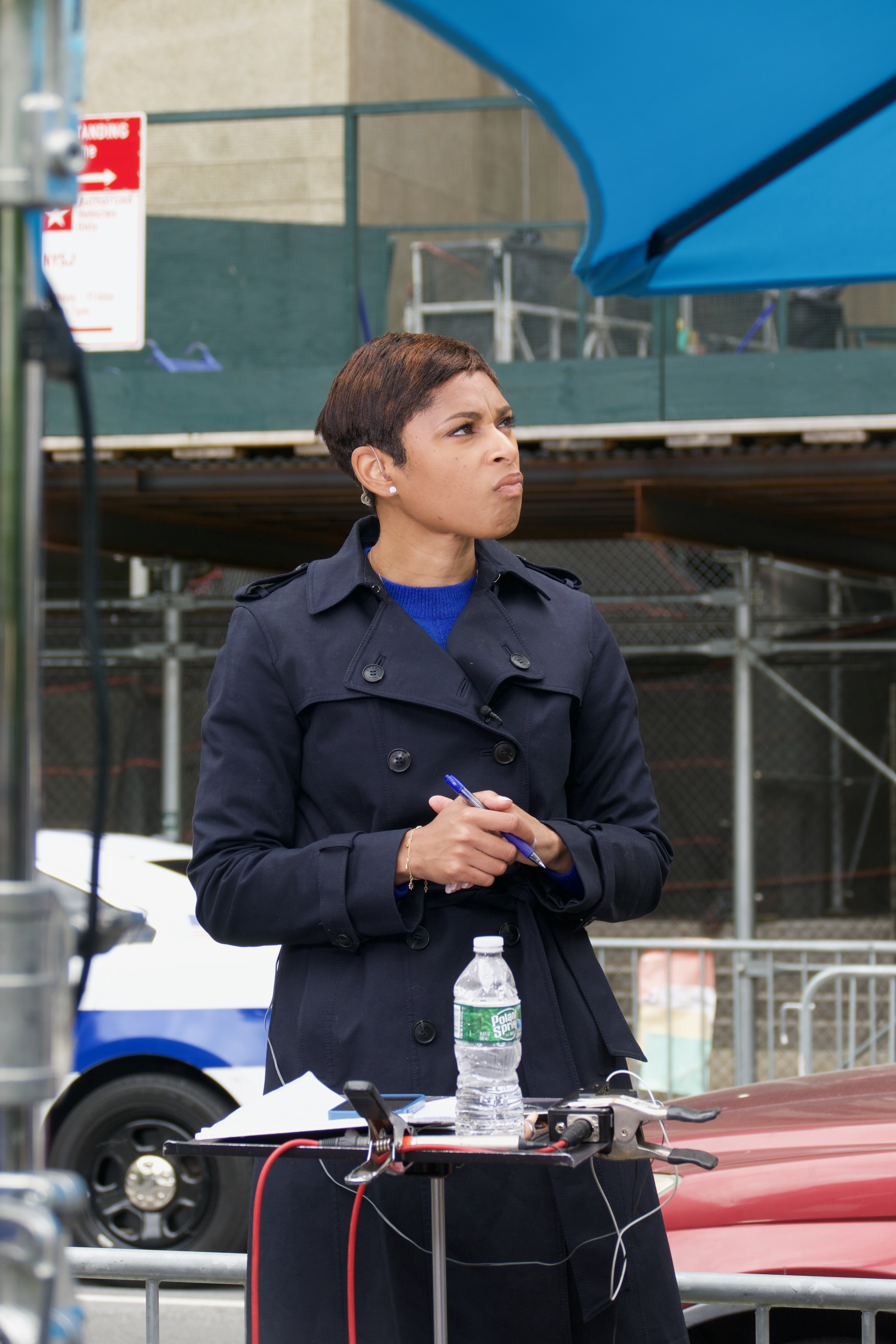
- Duncan in 2024
- Born: August 12, 1983 (age 43)
- Education: Aurora High School; Ohio University
- Occupation: CBS Weekend News Anchor / National Correspondent
- Years active: 2005–present
- Employer: CBS News

Jericka Alexis Duncan (/dʒəˈriːkə/ juh-REE-kuh; born August 12, 1983) is an American national TV news correspondent for CBS News in New York City and the sole anchor of the CBS Weekend News.

== Early life and education ==
Duncan was born in Baltimore in 1983. Her father, Ronnie Duncan, was a television sports anchor, and the family moved with his career living in Indianapolis, Columbus, and Cleveland. In 2001, she graduated from Aurora High School in Aurora, Ohio. At Aurora H.S., she played on the basketball team and did track and field. As a track & field competitor, Duncan set five records for Aurora High School. Once she graduated from high school, Duncan went on to attend Ohio University in Athens, Ohio, where she pursued a communication degree. In college, Duncan continued to run track & field and was captain of the track team. She received the NAACP Image Award of Athletics in 2005.

Duncan graduated from Ohio University in June 2005 with a Bachelor of Arts in Communication. She is a member of Zeta Phi Beta sorority.

== Journalism ==
- In 2005, Duncan became a reporter for NBC-affiliate television station WETM-TV in Elmira, New York.
- In 2007, Duncan became a reporter for CBS-affiliate WIVB-TV in Buffalo, New York.
- In 2010, she moved to CBS-owned KYW-TV in Philadelphia, Pennsylvania for a general assignment reporter job.
- In 2013, she became a national correspondent for CBS News.
- In 2020, CBS News announced corresponent Jericka Duncan would be promoted into a permanent anchor position. Duncan would be leading the Sunday edition of CBS Weekend News from the CBS Broadcast Center.
- In 2024, CBS announced Duncan would be the sole anchor for Saturday and Sunday for CBS Weekend News.

== Important events ==
Duncan has reported during memorable events such as the Washington Navy Yard shooting in 2013, the first anniversary of Hurricane Sandy in 2013, the 70th anniversary of D-Day in 2014 and the Trial of Sean Combs in 2025.

In 2021, she interviewed Bill Cosby after his release from prison. Jericka went inside of Cosby's home without cameras and alone for the interview. She was the only member of the media given an interview.

In 2021, Duncan emceed the RTDNA Murrow Awards in New York City.

== Awards ==
- In 2005, Duncan set the women's Ohio University school record in the 100 meter hurdles, with a 13.75 second finish. Duncan's record stands today. Ohio University is an NCAA Division I college.
- In 2005, Duncan received the NAACP Image Award of Athletics.
- In 2007, Duncan received the "Best Spot News Coverage" award from the New York State Broadcasters Association Award.
- In 2008, Duncan won a local "Best Morning Show" Emmy award after reporting on winter storms.
- In 2011 and 2012, Duncan covered the Philadelphia basement kidnapping, or the "Basement of Horror" case, where she reported on the captivity of four adults and the theft of their social security checks by their detainer. This led to Duncan winning a first place award from the Associated Press and receiving a nomination for a Mid-Atlantic Emmy Award.
- In 2012, Duncan was acknowledged as the "Broadcast Journalist of the Year" from the Philadelphia Association of Black Journalists.
- In 2014, Duncan was inducted into the Aurora High School Athletic Hall of Fame.
- In 2023, Duncan was inducted into Aurora High School's Hall of Fame for Distinguished Alumni.
- In 2025, Duncan became an Honorary Member of Zeta Phi Beta Sorority.
- In 2025, the Buffalo Broadcasters Hall of Fame named Duncan an inductee for her work into the New York area.
- In 2025, the NAACP honored Duncan for her commitment to truth and storytelling by giving her the President’s Award.

== Jeff Fager dismissal ==
In 2018, Jeff Fager was fired as executive producer of 60 Minutes after it was revealed that he sent Duncan threatening text messages, which Duncan exposed in September 2018. Fager had been accused of sexual harassment by several women who worked for him. When Duncan was reporting the story, Fager threatened her by saying, "If you repeat these false accusations without any of your own reporting to back them up you will be responsible for hurting me. Be careful. There are people who lost their jobs trying to harm me and if you pass on these damaging claims without your own reporting to back them up that will become a serious problem."

Once Duncan announced Fager's response to her, it opened up conversations regarding repercussions of reporting for the #MeToo movement. It led to the creation of the #reportingMeToo hashtag on Twitter. Also, this incident opened up a conversation about women being more likely to be assigned sexual harassment incidents and reporting messages from the accused.

In response to the moment when Fager was fired, Duncan was met with support from CBS coworkers Gayle King, Norah O'Donnell and John Dickerson. She was praised for taking a stand and revealing and reading aloud the text messages sent from Fager. A short time afterward, the Buffalo Association of Black Journalists announced Duncan as a leading speaker at one of their events titled "Social Media and Reporting on Race".

Jeff Glor of CBS Evening News was in the midst of covering Hurricane Florence as he said to Duncan, "You have done great work. It's difficult enough without dealing with this. That message was unacceptable. I think it's important for you to know, for everyone to know back there, that I, we, the entire team at Evening News supports you 100 percent."

== Personal life ==
Duncan is a single mom with a daughter named Journey.
