= Bryson DeChambeau =

American professional golfer (born 1993)

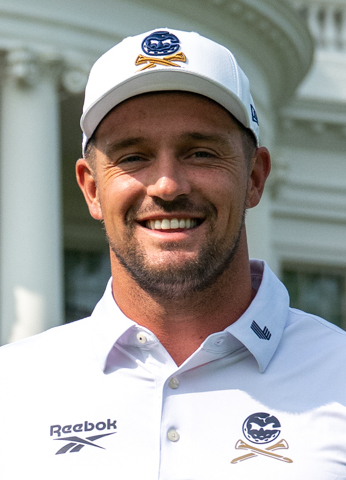
- DeChambeau in 2025

Personal information
- Full name: Bryson James Aldrich DeChambeau
- Nicknames: The Scientist, The Bison
- Nationality: United States
- Born: September 16, 1993 (age 33) Modesto, California, U.S.
- Height: 6 ft 1 in (1.85 m)
- Weight: 220 lb (100 kg)

Career
- Sport: Golf
- College: Southern Methodist University
- Turned professional: 2016
- Current tour: European Tour
- Former tours: PGA Tour; LIV Golf; Web.com Tour
- Professional wins: 16
- Highest ranking: 4 (May 9, 2021) (as of November 15, 2026)

Number of wins by tour
- PGA Tour: 9
- European Tour: 3
- Korn Ferry Tour: 1
- LIV Golf: 5

Best results in major championships (wins: 2)
- Masters Tournament: T5: 2025
- PGA Championship: 2nd/T2: 2024, 2025
- U.S. Open: Won: 2020, 2024
- The Open Championship: T8: 2022

Bryson James Aldrich DeChambeau (/dəʃæmˈboʊ/ də-sham-BOH; born September 16, 1993) is an American professional golfer who is currently playing on the European Tour for 2027. He formerly played on the PGA Tour and LIV Golf, and has won two major championships, the 2020 and 2024 U.S. Open.

As an amateur, DeChambeau became the fifth player in history to win both the NCAA Division I championship and the U.S. Amateur in the same year. With his U.S. Open victory he became the third player to have won those three championships, after Jack Nicklaus and Tiger Woods.

Renowned for his analytical approaches to the sport, DeChambeau has acquired the nickname "the Scientist". His clubs are specially designed to his specifications, with thicker than normal grips and irons that are all the same length. In 2020, he became the longest driver on the PGA Tour.

== Early life and amateur career ==
DeChambeau was born on September 16, 1993, in Modesto, California, to Janet (née Druffel) and Jon Aldrich DeChambeau. His full name is Bryson James Aldrich DeChambeau, with James being his middle name and "Aldrich DeChambeau" constituting two surnames. He did not find out he had two surnames until he was 14. DeChambeau's father was an accomplished amateur golfer who had a brief career as a professional. He later became director of operations at Riverbend Golf Club (renamed Dragonfly Golf Club) in Madera, California. DeChambeau has a brother named Garrett Wolford, who is 12 years older and was once a talented baseball player.

At age seven, DeChambeau moved to Clovis, California. He attended Clovis East High School and won the California State Junior Championship at age 16 in 2010. He graduated in 2012 and accepted a scholarship to play for the SMU Mustangs at Southern Methodist University in Dallas, Texas, where he majored in physics. DeChambeau wore an anachronistic flat cap while on the golf course due to his admiration for Ben Hogan and fellow SMU alumnus Payne Stewart.

In June 2015, DeChambeau became the first SMU Mustang to win the NCAA individual championship, recording a score of 280 (−8) to win by one stroke. In August, he won the U.S. Amateur title, defeating Derek Bard 7 & 6 in the 36-hole final. He became the fifth player to win both the NCAA and U.S. Amateur titles in the same year, joining Jack Nicklaus (1961), Phil Mickelson (1990), Tiger Woods (1996), and Ryan Moore (2004).

DeChambeau made his PGA Tour debut as an amateur in June 2015 at the FedEx St. Jude Classic near Memphis, Tennessee, and finished in 45th place. The following week, he played in his first major championship, the 2015 U.S. Open held at Chambers Bay. He shot 74-75 to miss the cut by four strokes. DeChambeau was unable to defend his NCAA title in 2016 after the SMU athletic department was handed a postseason ban by the NCAA, due to recruiting violations under former head coach Josh Gregory.

Due to SMU's post-season suspension, DeChambeau decided to forgo his senior season to play in a number of professional events. He retained his amateur status to avoid losing entry to the Masters Tournament, which he received due to his U.S. Amateur victory. At the 2015 Australian Masters in November, he finished runner-up, two shots behind Peter Senior. He was the low amateur at the 2016 Masters Tournament, finishing in a tie for 21st place.

== Professional career ==
=== Web.com Tour ===
Immediately after the Masters in mid-April 2016, DeChambeau turned professional and signed a long-term agreement with Cobra-Puma Golf. He made his pro debut days later at the RBC Heritage in South Carolina and tied for fourth, earning over $259,000. The decision to turn professional meant the forfeiture of his exemptions to the U.S. Open at Oakmont and Open Championship at Royal Troon, but DeChambeau qualified his way into the U.S. Open and tied for 15th place to earn over $152,000, improving his world ranking to 148. Despite the strong start, DeChambeau did not earn enough non-member FedEx Cup points that season to qualify for a 2017 PGA Tour card but did qualify for the Web.com Tour Finals. He was successful at earning his card through the Finals, due to a win at the DAP Championship.

=== PGA Tour ===
On July 16, 2017, DeChambeau earned his first PGA Tour victory by winning the John Deere Classic by a single stroke over Patrick Rodgers. He carded a round of 65 in the final round to win his maiden title in his 40th start on tour. The win gained DeChambeau a place in the 2017 Open Championship, which took place the following week. At Open, he missed the cut after rounds of 76–77 (+13).

On June 3, 2018, DeChambeau won the Memorial Tournament in Dublin, Ohio, in a sudden-death playoff against Kyle Stanley and An Byeong-hun, after the three finished regulation play tied at −15. After Stanley bogeyed the first hole of sudden death, DeChambeau proceeded to win with a birdie on the second hole, giving him his second victory on the tour. On August 26, 2018, he won The Northern Trust for his first playoff victory and, in the process, established a new record for the tournament when held at the Ridgewood Country Club – with a score of 266 – besting the old Ridgewood record of 270, which was set in 2014 by Hunter Mahan.

The following week, DeChambeau won at the Dell Technologies Championship played at TPC Boston in Norton, Massachusetts, with a final score of −16, two shots clear of Justin Rose. This put him over 2000 points ahead of second place player Dustin Johnson in the FedEx Cup rankings. This margin secured him top seeding at The Tour Championship, regardless of his finish at the BMW Championship. This also marked his fourth win on the tour, third for the year, and second in a FedEx Cup playoff event. At the Tour Championship, DeChambeau finished 19th out of 30 participants. As a result, he fell to 3rd in the FedEx Cup, winning $2,000,000. In September 2018, DeChambeau was named as a captain's pick by Jim Furyk for the United States team participating in the 2018 Ryder Cup. Europe defeated the U.S. team, 17½ points to 10½ points. DeChambeau went 0–3–0. He lost his singles match against Alex Norén.

On November 4, 2018, DeChambeau won the Shriners Hospitals for Children Open in Las Vegas, Nevada. The win was worth $1,260,000 in prize money. The win brought him to number five in the Official World Golf Ranking. On January 27, 2019, DeChambeau won the Omega Dubai Desert Classic in Dubai, UAE. DeChambeau claimed his maiden European Tour title by producing a closing 64 to win the tournament by seven shots. In December 2019, DeChambeau played on the U.S. team at the 2019 Presidents Cup at Royal Melbourne Golf Club in Australia. The U.S. team won 16–14. DeChambeau went 0–1–1 and halved his Sunday singles match against Adam Hadwin.

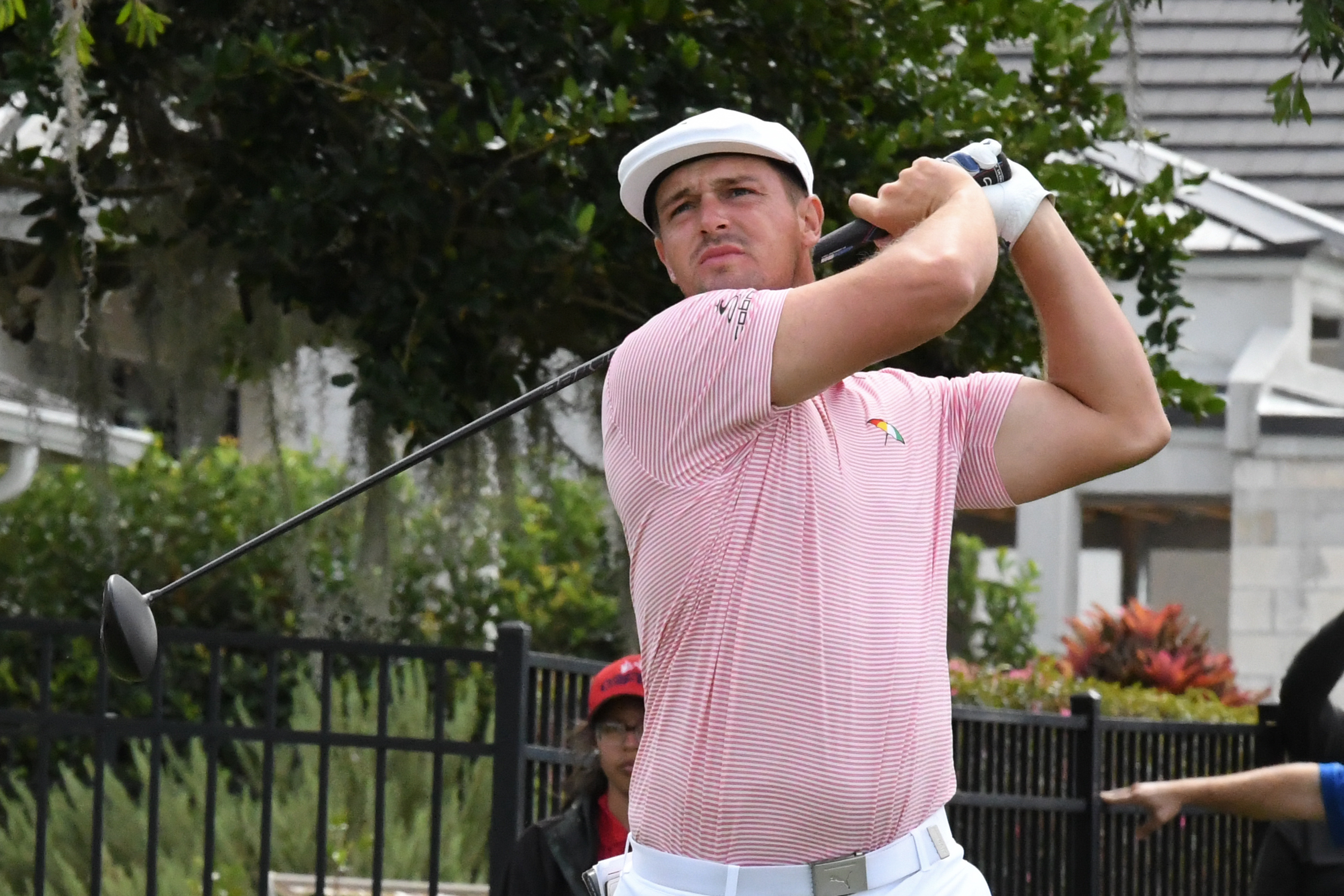
DeChambeau at the Arnold Palmer Invitational in 2020

Beginning in late 2019, DeChambeau set out to add muscle mass in order to increase his swing speed and hit the ball farther. He added 20 pounds before the tour's break due to the COVID-19 pandemic and another 20 during the break. When the tour resumed, he quickly moved to the lead in driving distance. On July 5, 2020, DeChambeau won the Rocket Mortgage Classic in Detroit, Michigan, by three strokes over Matthew Wolff. In the final round, DeChambeau shot a 7-under 65 at Detroit Golf Club, birdieing four of the first seven holes and closing with three consecutive birdies. He finished at a career-best 23-under 265. DeChambeau came into the week with six straight top-eight finishes and was the only player with top-10s in the first three events after the restart from the coronavirus.

In the second round of the 2020 Memorial Tournament in July, DeChambeau's second shot at the 15th went out of bounds under a fence. He argued that only part of the ball was out of bounds, and he should be allowed to play it, but PGA Tour rules official Ken Tackett ruled against him. DeChambeau asked for a ruling from a second official, who confirmed the initial ruling. He went on to shoot a quintuple-bogey 10 on the hole and miss the cut.

In August 2020, DeChambeau briefly held a share of the lead during the final round of the PGA Championship; he went on to finish in a tie for fourth place, his first top-10 finish in a major championship. Six weeks later, at the 120th U.S. Open at Winged Foot, he came from two strokes behind at the start of the final round to win his first major championship. His six-under par total gave him a six stroke victory over Matthew Wolff. He was the only player under par in the final round, with a three-under par 67 and the only player to finish under par for the tournament. With the win, he became the third player in history, after Jack Nicklaus and Tiger Woods, to win the NCAA Individual Championship, the U.S. Amateur and the U.S. Open during a career. The win moved him to number five in the Official World Golf Ranking, matching his previous best, which he had first achieved in November 2018.

In March 2021, DeChambeau won the Arnold Palmer Invitational at Bay Hill Club & Lodge in Orlando, Florida. He shot a final round one-under 71 to defeat Lee Westwood by one shot.

After shooting an opening round 1-over 71 at the 2021 Open Championship, DeChambeau placed blame on his driver, saying after the round, "That's what I said a couple of days ago; if I can hit it down the middle of the fairway, that's great, but with the driver right now, the driver sucks". That comment drew the ire of Ben Schomin, a tour operations manager for Cobra Golf who caddied for DeChambeau at the Rocket Mortgage Classic two weeks prior. Schomin told Golfweek, "It's just really, really painful when he says something that stupid. He has never really been happy, ever. Like, it's very rare when he's happy". DeChambeau would later issue an apology on Instagram.

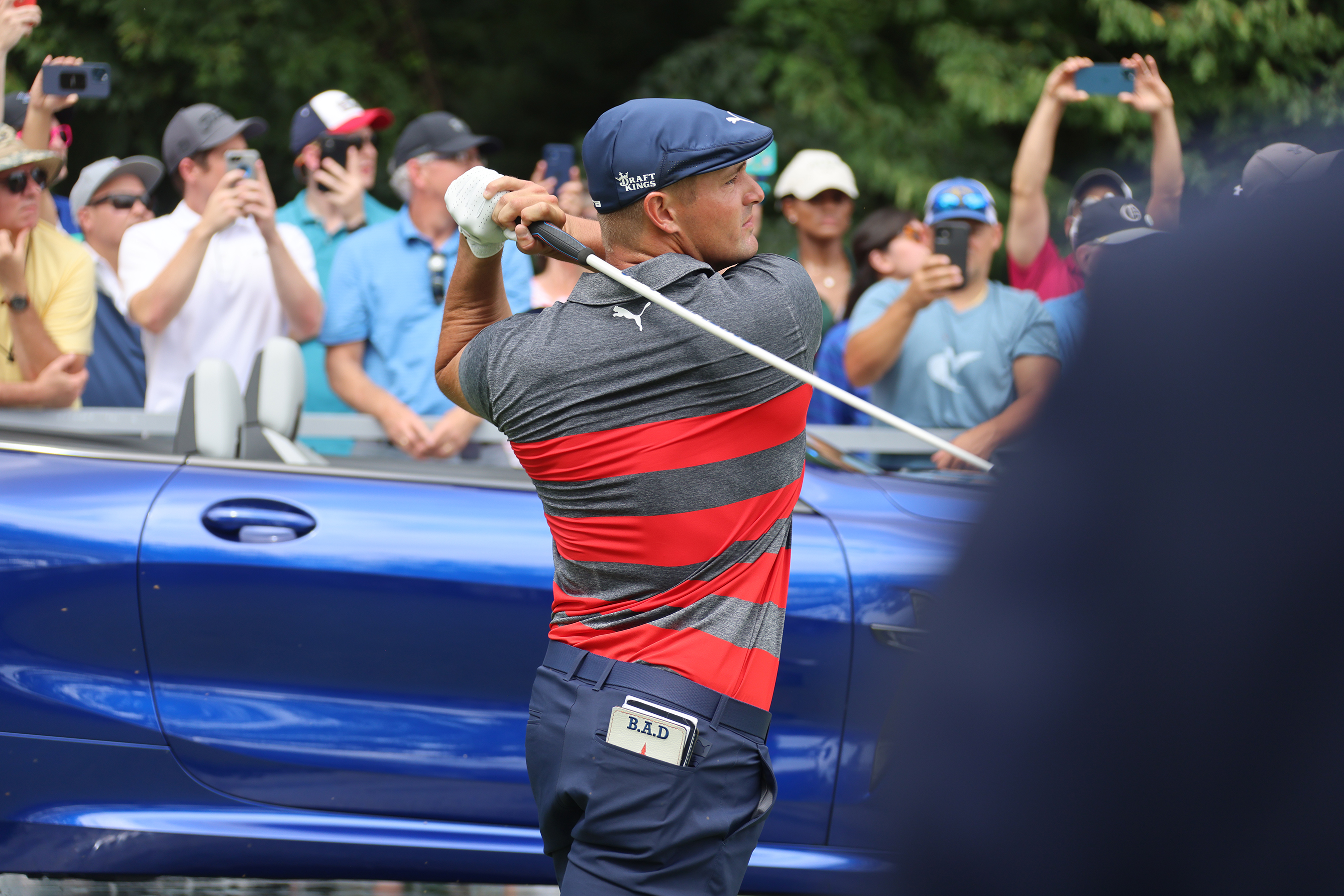
DeChambeau at the BMW Championship in 2021

In August 2021, DeChambeau shot 27 under-par at the BMW Championship in Owings Mills, Maryland, but lost on the sixth hole of a sudden-death playoff to Patrick Cantlay.

In September 2021, DeChambeau played on the U.S. team in the 2021 Ryder Cup at Whistling Straits in Kohler, Wisconsin. The U.S. team won 19–9 and Dechambeau went 2–0–1 and won his Sunday singles match against Sergio García.

=== LIV Golf ===
==== 2022–2023 ====
In February 2022, amid speculation that he was joining the Saudi-backed LIV Golf tour, DeChambeau released a statement committing to the PGA Tour. In April 2022, DeChambeau announced that he had surgery on his left wrist and would be taking the appropriate time to rest and recover. After missing the cut in the Memorial Tournament at the start of June, DeChambeau was again asked about LIV Golf, in which his answer suggested he would continue with the PGA Tour. However, a few days later on June 8, The Daily Telegraph reported that DeChambeau would be joining LIV Golf. DeChambeau’s announcement came just one day after Dustin Johnson made his PGA Tour resignation. On June 10, LIV Golf confirmed that DeChambeau had joined the tour.

As a result of joining LIV Golf, Rocket Mortgage ended its sponsorship deal with DeChambeau. 911familiesunited.org, a coalition of families and survivors of the September 11 attacks, sent a scathing letter to representatives of DeChambeau as well as other LIV Golf members, expressing their outrage toward the golfers for participating in LIV Golf and accusing them of sportswashing and betraying the United States. In June 2023, DeChambeau stated in an interview with CNN that families of the victims of the September 11 attacks should move forward "in forgiveness". He continued, stating "We'll never be able to repay the families back for what exactly happened just over 20 years ago, and what happened is definitely horrible... We're in a place now where it's time to start trying to work together to make things better together as a whole."

In August 2023 at The Greenbrier, DeChambeau won his first tournament on LIV Golf. He followed up a 61 in the second round, with a new tour record of 58 in the third and final round, which also tied the record for lowest round in an elite-level men's professional golf tournament.

Hole	1	2	3	4	5	6	7	8	9	Front	10	11	12	13	14	15	16	17	18	Back	Total
Par	4	4	3	4	4	4	4	3	4	34	4	4	5	4	4	3	4	5	3	36	70
Shots	3	3	3	3	3	3	3	4	3	28	3	4	4	4	4	2	3	4	2	30	58
To par	−1	−2	−2	−3	−4	−5	−6	−5	−6	−6	−7	−7	−8	−8	−8	−9	−10	−11	−12	−6	−12

In September, he won his second tournament on the LIV tour, at LIV Golf Chicago. He shot a final-round 63, including a 28 on the back nine, to win by one stroke.

==== 2024–present ====
At the 2024 PGA Championship, DeChambeau shot a final round 7-under par 64, which included a birdie on the 72nd hole, to tie leader Xander Schauffele. Schauffele then went on to birdie the 72nd hole himself to win by one stroke.

At the 2024 U.S. Open, DeChambeau got up and down from 55 yards away in the bunker on the 72nd hole to win his second major title, shooting 6-under for the tournament, one stroke ahead of Rory McIlroy. The broadcast of the tournament featuring DeChambeau's battle against McIlroy drew a peak viewership of 11.4 million, the highest since the 2015 U.S. Open.

DeChambeau shot rounds of 69-68-69 to stand in solo-second place after 54 holes at the 2025 Masters Tournament. He was in the final pairing on Sunday, two strokes behind the leader Rory McIlroy. DeChambeau took the outright lead after two holes, but struggled afterwards and carded a 3-over 75 to finish tied-5th, four strokes behind the champion McIlroy. Three weeks later, DeChambeau shot 19-under 197 to win the LIV Golf Korea event, his first LIV Golf victory since September 2023.

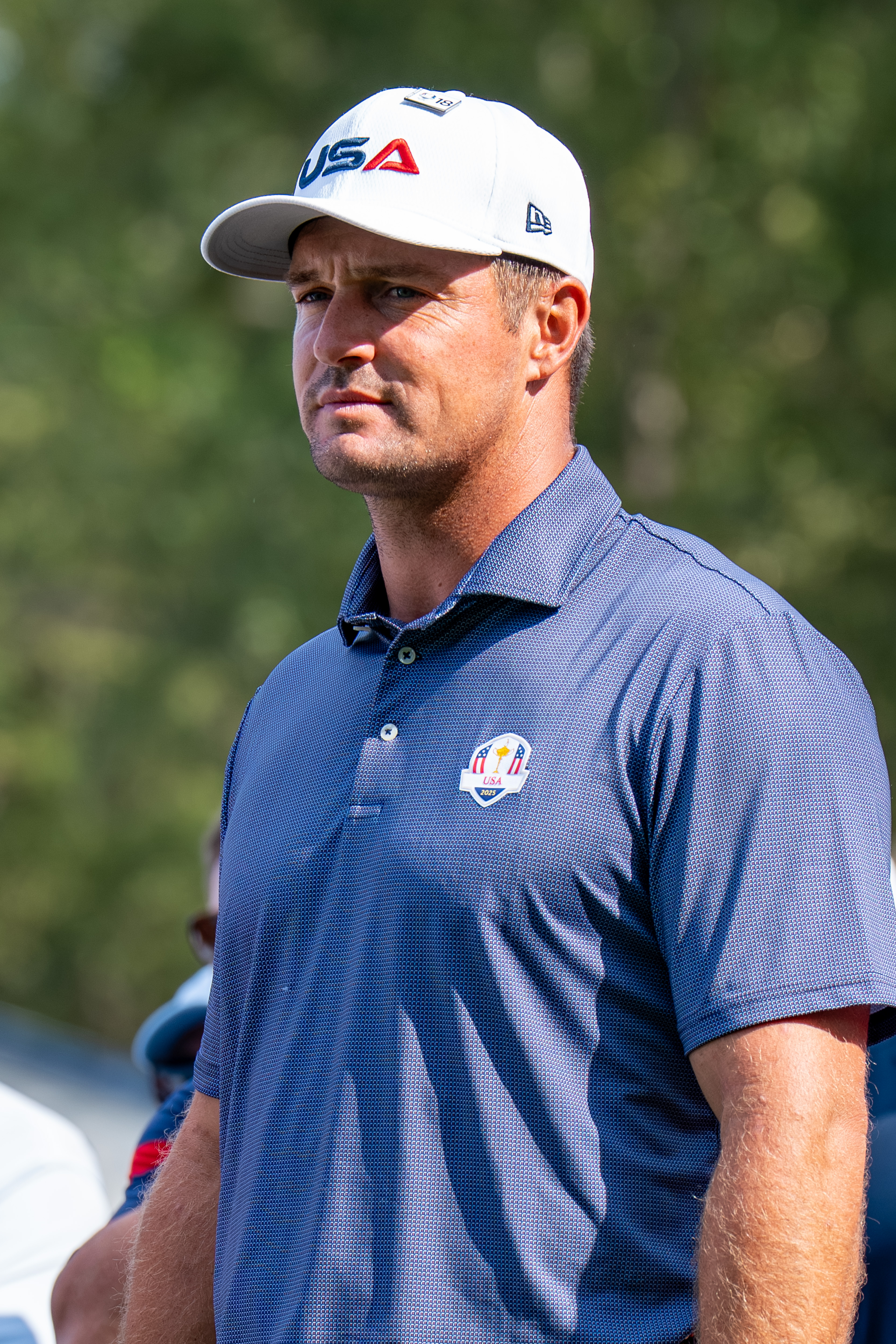
DeChambeau during the 2025 Ryder Cup

At the 2025 PGA Championship in May, DeChambeau finished runner-up alongside Harris English and Davis Riley, five strokes behind Scottie Scheffler. As defending champion at the 2025 U.S. Open in June, DeChambeau shot rounds of 73-77 at Oakmont Country Club to total 10-over and missed the cut. He was the first defending U.S. Open champion to miss the cut since Gary Woodland in 2020. DeChambeau opened with a 7-over 78 at the 2025 Open Championship in July, but rallied with a 65 to make the cut on the number. He shot 68-64 on the weekend to finish inside the top 10. DeChambeau was an automatic qualifier for the United States team in the 2025 Ryder Cup. He had a 1–3–1 record, including a tie in his singles match against Matt Fitzpatrick, as the United States lost by a score of 15–13.

In March 2026, DeChambeau won the LIV Golf Singapore event in a playoff over Richard T. Lee. The following week, DeChambeau shot 26-under 258 to tie for first alongside Jon Rahm at LIV Golf South Africa. He made birdie on the first playoff hole to defeat Rahm and claim the victory. This made him the third man to have won five or more LIV Golf titles, joining Brooks Koepka and Joaquín Niemann.

During the second round of the 2026 Open Championship, DeChambeau received a two-stroke penalty for improving the conditions affecting his stroke—specifically, the area of his intended swing—under Rule 8.1. The ruling dropped him from solo 2nd place to a tie for 5th place. Upon being informed of the penalty, DeChambeau argued with rules officials, brought them back to the scene of the incident to review the terrain, and reportedly expressed his anger by stating he would not play the following day. According to golf journalist Geoff Shackelford, DeChambeau wanted to call U.S. President Donald Trump to intervene in the dispute. However, tournament officials denied the request, and R&A executives later confirmed that no such phone call from the president was ever received. DeChambeau would continue to play and ended up finishing tied for 14th.

DeChambeau was one of the only golfers to publicly express an intent to remain with LIV Golf following a reorganization plan following the withdrawal of its major sponsor the Public Investment Fund and the departure of most of the tour's other marquee golfers. BC Partners, which had planned to front the money to fund the reorganization, determined that because of the exodus of the other marquee players, that it would be insufficient to maintain the tour and withdrew its funding, leading to LIV Golf shutting down in November 2026.

=== European Tour ===
In November 2026, the Associated Press reported DeChambeau would join the European tour for the 2027 season following the demise of LIV Golf. DeChambeau was eligible to join following his 2024 U.S. Open victory, which occurred in the last five years.

== Unique clubs ==
DeChambeau was influenced by Homer Kelley's The Golfing Machine, a physics-based golf book which he was introduced to at age 15 by his golf instructor Mike Schy. While in high school, DeChambeau talked to Schy about developing a single-plane swing, a concept inspired by reading Kelley. He soon encountered the problem that his posture had to change as different clubs were of different lengths, so he then asked Schy if he could have a set with all irons and wedges being the same length to facilitate the single-plane swing. The aim for DeChambeau was to reduce the variables in his swing and attempt to make golf easier. DeChambeau recalled in 2016: "I took a set and messed it up, made all the clubs the same length, and saw if it worked. It did." He does not turn his wrists during his swing.

As of 2020, all of DeChambeau's irons and wedges are cut to exactly the same length: 37.5 inches (95.3 cm). Their lie and bounce angles are also the same; only the lofts are different. In addition to the single-length concept, his clubs are unusual for their extremely upright lie angle. He also uses custom-made carbon graphite shafts on all of his clubs, including his putter. He was the first to do so among PGA Tour players. In 2011, at the suggestion of his instructor Mike Schy, DeChambeau switched to JumboMax Grips, the largest grips commercially available, which allow him to hold the club in his palms rather than his fingers.

DeChambeau is known for his driving distance, and has experimented with a longer-than-usual 48-inch driver. Partly in response to DeChambeau, the R&A and USGA, which jointly determine the rules of golf, instituted a local rule from 2022 to allow competition organizers to limit the permitted length of a non-putter golf club to 46 inches, to avoid issues with the effect of club length on increased driving distances. DeChambeau said in 2021 that the rule change was "a little flattering in a sense," and said the 48-inch driver had not worked for him.

On August 6, 2023, DeChambeau won his first event on the LIV tour using a unique driver which is not usually played by professional golfers – a Krank Formula Fire LD which is designed for and primarily used by elite long-drive competitors. After the event, he was quoted as saying "It's probably performed the best I've ever had in the past five years in professional golf for me".

== Public image ==
DeChambeau has been described by Golf Digest as "one of golf's most newsworthy characters".

In January 2019, Brooks Koepka commented on slow pace of play at the Dubai Desert Classic. Although he did not mention DeChambeau's name, it was inferred as criticism of DeChambeau. At The Northern Trust in August 2019, footage of DeChambeau taking more than two minutes over a short putt prompted public criticism from multiple golfers. DeChambeau said he exceeded the 40-second limit to hit a shot only about five percent of the time and stated that he had been unfairly singled out. On the practice area at The Northern Trust, DeChambeau approached Koepka's caddie and told him that Koepka should criticize his pace of play face-to-face. The pair later had a meeting and agreed to not publicly criticize each other; DeChambeau stated that it "creates a bad image for the PGA Tour". DeChambeau also admitted to slow play on the greens. At the 2020 WGC-FedEx St. Jude Invitational, DeChambeau unsuccessfully sought relief by claiming that a fire ant hill near his ball constituted a dangerous animal condition. Koepka found himself in a similar position on the course the following day and jokingly pointed out an ant near his ball.

After footage of Koepka reacting with irritation as DeChambeau passed him during an interview at the 2021 PGA Championship circulated widely, the feud reignited. Spectators heckled DeChambeau with Koepka's name and around ten were ejected from the 2021 Memorial Tournament for doing so. DeChambeau said he had not asked for their removal and described the taunts as flattering. DeChambeau faced Koepka in an edition of The Match in November 2021, which Koepka won. Both DeChambeau and Koepka joined LIV Golf in 2022, and they conducted a joint press conference in October of that year to advocate for LIV Golf events receiving world ranking points. Koepka said in 2023 that the dispute with DeChambeau had been resolved: "Believe it or not, we squashed it. ... We've got a good open line of communication, we've figured it all out and we're good." In 2024, DeChambeau and Koepka played as a team in an edition of The Match against Rory McIlroy and Scottie Scheffler. McIlroy and Scheffler won the exhibition.

During the third round of the 2020 Rocket Mortgage Classic, DeChambeau confronted a cameraman who had continued filming him after he struck the sand in frustration following a bunker shot. He said in a post-round interview: "I mean, I understand that it's his job to video me, but at the same point, I think we need to start protecting our players out here compared to showing a potential vulnerability and hurting someone's image." He was criticized for these comments; Eamon Lynch of Golfweek stated that DeChambeau's reaction had damaged his brand more than the cameraman's footage. After winning the tournament, DeChambeau said in a press conference that he had "talked it out and it was all great and no issues, no issues whatsoever. So, appreciate what they do, appreciate everybody that works hard out here to provide great entertainment." DeChambeau began a pattern of turning down media requests in 2021. After an opening-round 67 at the 2026 Open Championship, he declined to speak to print or television media, which was the fifth consecutive time he had done so following a major championship round.

DeChambeau started creating content on YouTube in 2020, originally to show behind-the-scenes footage about his life on the PGA Tour. He stated he wanted to use the platform as a vehicle to reinvent his public image and communicate directly with fans. On his channel, he participated in challenges such as using 1930s-era hickory clubs, as well as "Break 50", a series about shooting a sub-50 round in a scramble format. Guests in his "Break 50" series have included fellow professional golfers, athletes such as Tony Romo and Tom Brady, as well as President Donald Trump. DeChambeau's video with Trump was released in July 2024 and received over 3 million views within 12 hours. By September 2024, DeChambeau had garnered around 2.5 million subscribers on YouTube, surpassing the PGA Tour's subscriber count on the platform. He stated that he took inspiration from the YouTuber MrBeast, in particular his gamification strategies. DeChambeau broke 50 alongside basketball player Steph Curry in an October 2025 video, which received 3.6 million views within three days. David Walsh of The Sunday Times said regarding DeChambeau's YouTube channel: "Like every other defector [to the LIV Tour], DeChambeau said he wanted to grow the game and, unlike every other defector, he has grown the game."

== Personal life ==
DeChambeau's father Jon was diagnosed with diabetes in the early 1990s, and suffered kidney failure due to the disease in 2014. Through Bryson's victory at the U.S. Amateur in 2015, Jon reconnected with a high school friend, Ron Bankofier, who donated a kidney to him in 2017. Jon was able to witness Bryson's first win on the PGA Tour a few months later, and his victory at the U.S. Open in 2020. Jon continued to struggle with diabetes after the kidney transplant, and died November 2022, aged 63.

DeChambeau withdrew from the 2020 Summer Olympics after testing positive for COVID-19. When asked about it before the start of the WGC-FedEx St. Jude Invitational, DeChambeau said he was not vaccinated and "the vaccine doesn't necessarily prevent it from happening. I'm young enough, I'd rather give [the vaccine] to people who need it. I don't need it. I'm a healthy, young individual that will continue to work on my health. I don't think taking the vaccine away from someone who needs it is a good thing. My dad is a perfect example. He got [the vaccine] early on because he's a diabetic. People like that need to get it".

In December 2017, DeChambeau played a round of golf alongside U.S. President Donald Trump, senator David Perdue, and former professional golfer Dana Quigley. DeChambeau had also gifted Trump a set of golf clubs that year valued at $750. DeChambeau said in a 2020 interview, "I am extremely honored to represent Trump Golf and have the relationship with the Trump Organization that I have. From Larry Glick, to Eric Trump and Donald Trump Jr., the entire team is always behind me 100%, and I am grateful for their support".

After winning the 2020 U.S. Open, DeChambeau celebrated his victory at Trump National Golf Club Westchester with Eric Trump. Following the January 6 United States Capitol attack and the PGA of America's decision to remove the 2022 PGA Championship from Trump National Golf Club Bedminster, DeChambeau had the Trump logo removed from his bag. He said, "It's unfortunate and it is what it is and I understand it. At the end of the day, whatever [the PGA of America’s] moves are, they are. I really don't have a comment". DeChambeau played a round of golf with Donald Trump two months later. He also played with Donald Trump, alongside Eric Trump and Dustin Johnson, in a pro-am round at the 2022 LIV Golf Bedminster event. He said afterwards, "It was an honor." After Trump won the 2024 presidential election, DeChambeau was invited on stage during Trump's victory speech at the Palm Beach County Convention Center.

In 2025, DeChambeau was selected to be the chairperson of President Trump's recreated Council on Sports, Fitness, and Nutrition. He also announced his intention to launch a multi-sport complex in his hometown of Clovis, California, to promote youth sports.

== Amateur wins ==
- 2010 California State Junior Championship
- 2013 Trans-Mississippi Amateur
- 2014 The American Championship, Erin Hills Intercollegiate
- 2015 NCAA Division I Championship, U.S. Amateur

== Professional wins (16) ==
=== PGA Tour wins (9) ===
Legend
Major championships (2)
FedEx Cup playoff events (2)
Other PGA Tour (5)

No.	Date	Tournament	Winning score	To par	Margin of victory	Runner(s)-up
1	Jul 16, 2017	John Deere Classic	66-65-70-65=266	−18	1 stroke	(United States) Patrick Rodgers
2	Jun 3, 2018	Memorial Tournament	69-67-66-71=273	−15	Playoff	(South Korea) An Byeong-hun, (United States) Kyle Stanley
3	Aug 26, 2018	The Northern Trust	68-66-63-69=266	−18	4 strokes	(United States) Tony Finau
4	Sep 3, 2018	Dell Technologies Championship	70-68-63-67=268	−16	2 strokes	(England) Justin Rose
5	Nov 4, 2018	Shriners Hospitals for Children Open	66-66-65-66=263	−21	1 stroke	(United States) Patrick Cantlay
6	Jul 5, 2020	Rocket Mortgage Classic	66-67-67-65=265	−23	3 strokes	(United States) Matthew Wolff
7	Sep 20, 2020	U.S. Open	69-68-70-67=274	−6	6 strokes	(United States) Matthew Wolff
8	Mar 7, 2021	Arnold Palmer Invitational	67-71-68-71=277	−11	1 stroke	(England) Lee Westwood
9	Jun 16, 2024	U.S. Open (2)	67-69-67-71=274	−6	1 stroke	(Northern Ireland) Rory McIlroy

PGA Tour playoff record (1–1)

No.	Year	Tournament	Opponent(s)	Result
1	2018	Memorial Tournament	(South Korea) An Byeong-hun, (United States) Kyle Stanley	Won with birdie on second extra hole Stanley eliminated by par on first hole
2	2021	BMW Championship	(United States) Patrick Cantlay	Lost to birdie on sixth extra hole

=== LIV Golf League wins (5) ===
No.	Date	Tournament	Winning score	To par	Margin of victory	Runner(s)-up
1	Aug 6, 2023	LIV Golf Greenbrier^{1}	68-61-58=187	−23	6 strokes	(Chile) Mito Pereira
2	Sep 24, 2023	LIV Golf Chicago^{1}	68-69-63=200	−13	1 stroke	(India) Anirban Lahiri, (Australia) Marc Leishman
3	May 4, 2025	LIV Golf Korea	65-66-66=197	−19	2 strokes	(United States) Charles Howell III
4	Mar 15, 2026	LIV Golf Singapore	67-65-72-66=270	−14	Playoff	(Canada) Richard T. Lee
5	Mar 22, 2026	LIV Golf South Africa	63-64-65-66=258	−26	Playoff	(Spain) Jon Rahm

^{1}Co-sanctioned by the MENA Tour

LIV Golf League playoff record (2–0)

No.	Year	Tournament	Opponent	Result
1	2026	LIV Golf Singapore	(Canada) Richard T. Lee	Won with par on first extra hole
2	2026	LIV Golf South Africa	(Spain) Jon Rahm	Won with birdie on first extra hole

=== European Tour wins (3) ===
Legend
Major championships (2)
Other European Tour (1)

No.	Date	Tournament	Winning score	To par	Margin of victory	Runner-up
1	Jan 27, 2019	Omega Dubai Desert Classic	66-66-68-64=264	−24	7 strokes	(England) Matt Wallace
2	Sep 20, 2020	U.S. Open	69-68-70-67=274	−6	6 strokes	(United States) Matthew Wolff
3	Jun 16, 2024	U.S. Open (2)	67-69-67-71=274	−6	1 stroke	(Northern Ireland) Rory McIlroy

=== Web.com Tour wins (1) ===
Legend
Finals events (1)
Other Web.com Tour (0)

No.	Date	Tournament	Winning score	To par	Margin of victory	Runners-up
1	Sep 11, 2016	DAP Championship	64-70-68-71=273	−7	Playoff	(Argentina) Julián Etulain, (United States) Andres Gonzales, (United States) Nicholas Lindheim

Web.com Tour playoff record (1–0)

No.	Year	Tournament	Opponents	Result
1	2016	DAP Championship	(Argentina) Julián Etulain, (United States) Andres Gonzales, (United States) Nicholas Lindheim	Won with par on second extra hole Etulain and Lindheim eliminated by birdie on first hole

== Major championships ==
=== Wins (2) ===
Year	Championship	54 holes	Winning score	Margin	Runner-up
2020	U.S. Open	2 shot deficit	−6 (69-68-70-67=274)	6 strokes	(United States) Matthew Wolff
2024	U.S. Open (2)	3 shot lead	−6 (67-69-67-71=274)	1 stroke	(Northern Ireland) Rory McIlroy

=== Results timeline ===
Results not in chronological order in 2020.

Tournament	2015	2016	2017	2018
Masters Tournament		T21LA		T38
U.S. Open	CUT	T15	CUT	T25
The Open Championship			CUT	T51
PGA Championship			T33	CUT

Tournament	2019	2020	2021	2022	2023	2024	2025	2026
Masters Tournament	T29	T34	T46	CUT	CUT	T6	T5	CUT
PGA Championship	CUT	T4	T38		T4	2	T2	CUT
U.S. Open	T35	1	T26	T56	T20	1	CUT	CUT
The Open Championship	CUT	NT	T33	T8	T60	CUT	T10	T14

Win
Top 10
Did not play

LA = low amateur
CUT = missed the half-way cut
"T" = tied
NT = no tournament due to COVID-19 pandemic

=== Summary ===
Tournament	Wins	2nd	3rd	Top-5	Top-10	Top-25	Events	Cuts made
Masters Tournament	0	0	0	1	2	3	10	7
PGA Championship	0	2	0	4	4	4	9	6
U.S. Open	2	0	0	2	2	5	12	8
The Open Championship	0	0	0	0	2	3	9	6
Totals	2	2	0	7	10	15	40	27

- Most consecutive cuts made – 7 (2020 PGA – 2021 Open Championship)
- Longest streak of top-10s – 3 (2024 Masters – 2024 U.S. Open)

== Results in The Players Championship ==
Tournament	2018	2019	2020	2021
The Players Championship	T37	T20	C	T3

Top 10

"T" indicates a tie for a place
C = Canceled after the first round due to the COVID-19 pandemic

== Results in World Golf Championships ==
Tournament	2017	2018	2019	2020	2021	2022
Championship			T56	2	T22	
Match Play			T40	NT^{1}	T42	T58
Invitational	T60	30	T48	T30	T8	
Champions				NT^{1}	NT^{1}	NT^{1}

^{1}Cancelled due to COVID-19 pandemic

Top 10
Did not play

NT = No tournament
"T" = Tied
Note that the Championship and Invitational were discontinued from 2022.

== U.S. national team appearances ==
Amateur

- Palmer Cup: 2014
- Eisenhower Trophy: 2014 (winners)
- Walker Cup: 2015

Professional

- Ryder Cup: 2018, 2021 (winners), 2025
- Presidents Cup: 2019 (winners)

== See also ==
- 2016 Web.com Tour Finals graduates
- Lowest rounds of golf
