= Tanglewood National Golf Club =

Golf course in Bainbridge Township, Ohio

Coordinates: 41°23′57″N 81°19′45″W

Tanglewood National Golf Club is a public golf course located in Bainbridge Township, Geauga County, Ohio within the Tanglewood Lake housing development.

Formerly known as Tanglewood Country Club which was a private country club, the club went into receivership in 2007 after the Tanglewood Tr. road to the club was closed for 3 years destroying the business.

On June 6, 2009, Tanglewood Country Club was purchased at auction by Marc Strauss for $950,000 - less than half of its appraised value and Tanglewood National Golf Club as of July 1, 2009.

Tanglewood National Golf Club was sold in late 2023 for an undisclosed amount to new owners. It was listed for $2.2 million.

== The golf course ==
The 18 hole championship golf course was built by William F. Mitchell, a regarded member of the American Society of Golf Course Architects in 1966 and opened in 1967.

The 18-hole course sits on 132.47 acres (0.5361 km^{2}) and features tree-lined fairways, 46 sand bunkers and water features including a creek running throughout.

Course record: 67 - Jubal Jerik

With a 144 slope rating, Tanglewood is the former number one slope rated course in Northeastern Ohio. Tanglewood has hosted major golf tournaments, among them the PGA Tour's last Cleveland Open, in 1972, the LPGA Babe Zaharias Classic and the Ohio Open.

Fuzzy Zoeller, U.S. Open winner and professional golfer, said that Tanglewood could be a U.S. Open course. "Set the tees on the blues, grow the rough and you've got an open course".

In 1972, Tanglewood Country Club hosted the PGA's Cleveland Open. The Winner: David Graham SCORE: -6 (68, 73, 68, 69 = 278) PRIZE: $30,000.00. Graham won on the second hole of a sudden death playoff with Bruce Devlin.

== Tanglewood scorecard ==
Tanglewood
Tee	Rating/Slope	1	2	3	4	5	6	7	8	9	Out	10	11	12	13	14	15	16	17	18	In	Total
Blue	75.8 / 144	520	323	358	219	423	521	184	457	463	3468	417	532	174	519	397	441	238	423	420	3561	7029
White	72.4 / 137	471	288	339	176	380	476	142	394	354	3020	400	486	164	493	388	393	190	395	384	3293	6313
Gold	68.8 / 128	427	244	278	158	335	405	115	335	334	2631	343	456	137	428	355	346	173	361	324	2923	5554
Red	72.6 / 125	423	241	276	154	331	402	110	331	269	2537	343	399	130	411	309	343	163	361	324	2783	5320
Par	Men's	5	4	4	3	4	5	3	4	4	36	4	5	3	5	4	4	3	4	4	36	72
SI	Men's	3	13	11	15	5	9	17	1	7		6	16	18	2	10	12	14	4	8
Par	Women's	5	4	4	3	4	5	3	4	4	36	4	5	3	5	4	4	3	4	4	36	72
SI	Women's	1	11	13	15	5	3	17	7	9		4	18	16	6	10	12	14	2	8

- Greens: Bent Grass
- Fairways: Bent Grass

== Owners ==
- Dennis Romanini 1981-2008
- Huntington Bank 2008-2009
- Marc Strauss 2009-2012
- Tanglewood Lake Homeowners Association 2012–Present

== Head golf professionals ==
- Mike Limback
- Bill Germana
- James H. Dale / Assistants: Lenny Vericelli, Jubal Jerik, Mike Kyle, Brian Huff
- Jubal A. Jerik / Assistants: Jimmy "Z" Zambataro, Bob Gurley, B.J. Williams
- Tony Guerrieri / Assistants: Joe Romanini
- Joe Romanini
- Matt Baca 2009–present

== Bagroom ==
The bagroom

The Bagroom was located just below the Golf Shop where the members stored their golf bags. The Bagroom also housed the towel laundering facility and the range ball storage and cleaning facility. It was connected to the Cart Barn where the golf carts were housed. This building is part of phase 3 renovations.

The Pro Shop, now located in the Clubhouse is fully stocked with clubs, apparel (both men's and women's)and accessories. The snack shop is also located within the Pro Shop with full liquor license.

== The clubhouse ==
The Clubhouse

The Tanglewood Country Club Clubhouse (27,00 square feet) has gone through a complete renovation. Phase I which included redesign and replacement of roof, all new windows and doors. The exterior was refaced with split rock sandstone. The Porte Cochere has been redesigned to complement the exterior of the building. Renovations included replacement of flooring throughout, redesign of conference room, addition of 2 new bathrooms, remodel of Main Ballroom (200 guests) West Room (80) guests, for a combination of 300 attendees, the old Pavilion Restaurant will be an additional Ballroom up to 70 guests. The pool was removed and regraded. This area will be relandscaped and the parking increased as well as the driving range being enlarged.

== Events ==
- PGA Cleveland Open 1972 aka The PGA "$150,000 Cleveland Open Golf Championship"
- LPGA Babe Zaharias Classic
- Northern Ohio PGA Jim Garner Memorial Golf Tournament
- Ohio Open Golf Championship (1981)
- Nestle/Bernie Kosar Charity Classic
- Sickle Cell Anemia Golf Outing
- Marymont Cavs Charity Golf Classic
- Kent State Architects
- American Greetings Golf Outing
- Cousins Cigar Outing
- Tiffany's Cabaret Golf Outing
- NFL Alumni Golf Outing
- Urban League of Cleveland
- Vincent Federico Memorial Outing
- 1st Annual Tanglewood Country Club Memorial Tournament - June 12, 2009
- 3rd Annual Tanglewood Country Club Memorial Tournament * (2nd Annual TCCM was played off-site due to poor course conditions).

== Member events ==
	Member/member	Men's Club Champion	Women's Club Champion	Tanglewood C.C. Memorial	Tanglewood C.C. Memorial Team Match Play
1968			Doris Bortner		
1969			Rita Grove		
1970			Jane Kern		
1971			Jane Kern		
1972		Russ Hurst	Marilyn Althans		
1973		Wayne Burge	Rita Grove		
1974		Wayne Burge	Jane Lyle		
1975		John Skinner, Jr.	Marilyn Althans		
1976	D. Zemple / F. Young	Tom Petrosewicz, Jr.	Ramona Young		
1977	J. Harrington / M. Jenkins	Tom Petrosewicz, Jr.	Julie Kostelnik		
1978	F. Sutton / W. Hamer	Wayne Burge	Julie Kostelnik		
1979	Pat Emrich / Tony Martino	Steve Murphy	Julie Kostelnik		
1980	K. Colerbrook / R. Hess	Dave Nunn	Julie Kostelnik		
1981	S. Margiotta / B. Bodolay	Frank Carlone	Romona Young		
1982	B. Rapparlie / J. Harless	John McMahon	Mary Ellen Ferrato		
1983	R. Jantz / B. Rini	Wayne Burge	Kathy Hayes		
1984	G. Goldfarb / B. Troiano	Wayne Burge	Kathy Hayes		
1985	D. Spirito / T. Gerome	Rick Areddy	Kathy Hayes		
1986	W. Burge / R. Levocz	Rick Areddy	Kathy Hayes		
1987	R. Pieslak / B. Conforti	Wayne Burge	Kathy Hayes		
1988		Greg Urbanek	Kathy Hayes		
1989	B. Troiano / G. Goldfarb	Rick Areddy	Kathy Hayes		
1990	T. Bobich / M. Donovan	Joe Tasca	Kathy Hayes		
1991	D. Romanini / J. Tasca	Rick Areddy	Kathy Hayes		
1992	B. Troiano / G. Goldfarb	Nick Federico	Kathy Hayes		
1993	T. Skerl / D. Drabek	Rick Areddy	Kathy Hayes		
1994	R. Fankhauser / A. Solomon	Nick Federico	Kathy Hayes		
1995	R. Fankhauser / A. Solomon	Greg Urbanek	Kathy Hayes		
1996	V. Gatto / P. Pannetti	Greg Urbanek	Missy Bauer		
1997	D. Kostelnik / M. Kostelnik, Jr.	Bill Germana	Molly O'Neil		
1998	D. Kostelnik / M. Kostelnik, Jr.	Tom Webb	Kathy Hayes		
1999	Dr. Masin / J. Varney	Derek Paton	Mary Ann Muccio		
2000	B. Carver / J. Wander	Bill Germana	Kathy Hayes		
2001		Sid Savitt	Mary Ann Muccio		
2002		Roy Fankhauser	Mary Ann Muccio		
2003	R. Fisher / Dr. Masin	Leo Szczepanski	Mary Ann Muccio		
2004	B. Lipson / S. Gilson	Bob Lipson	Mary Ann Muccio		
2005	R. Sciuva / N. Mussara	Bill Germana	Mary Ann Muccio		
2006	M. O'Hara / S. Crump	Bob Lipson	Mary Ann Muccio		
2009					
2010					
2011				Jim Flaiz	Mike Laszlo
2012				Mike Laszlo	Mike Laszlo
2013				Jim Flaiz	Jim Flaiz & Mark Seifried
2014				Mike Laszlo	Mike Laszlo
