= Nicholas Lindheim =

American professional golfer (born 1984)

Personal information
- Full name: Nicholas K. Lindheim
- Nationality: United States
- Born: November 9, 1984 (age 41) Mission Viejo, California, U.S.
- Height: 6 ft 0 in (1.83 m)
- Weight: 170 lb (77 kg; 12 st)
- Spouse: Gracie Heim
- Children: 1

Career
- Sport: Golf
- Turned professional: 2005
- Current tour: PGA Tour
- Former tours: Korn Ferry Tour; PGA Tour Latinoamérica; Florida Professional Golf Tour
- Professional wins: 11

Number of wins by tour
- Korn Ferry Tour: 3
- Other: 8

Best results in major championships
- Masters Tournament: DNP
- PGA Championship: DNP
- U.S. Open: T56: 2014
- The Open Championship: DNP

Nicholas K. Lindheim (born November 9, 1984) is an American professional golfer who currently plays on the PGA Tour.

== Career ==
In 2005, Lindheim turned professional. He played on several U.S. mini-tours during his early career including the Florida Professional Golf Tour. His first win on this tour came at the 2010 event at Pelican Bay. Subsequently, he won a further five events on the tour.

In 2014, Lindheim joined the Web.com Tour and PGA Tour Latinoamérica. During his season on the Web.com Tour, he achieved two top-10 finishes. In 2014, Lindheim qualified for his first major championship by shooting 7-under-par in sectional qualifying for the 2014 U.S. Open. He went on to make the cut and finished in a tie for 56th. In October 2014, Lindheim achieved his first win in an Official World Golf Ranking points event by winning the Arturo Calle Colombian Classic on PGA Tour Latinoamérica. He finished 51st on the 2015 regular season money list and 39th on the Finals list, not enough to qualify for a PGA Tour card. In 2016, he earned his first win on the Web.com Tour at the Utah Championship. This win helped him finish in the top 25 in the regular season to earn his PGA Tour card for the 2016–17 season. After a disappointing rookie season, he qualified for the 2017 Web.com Tour Finals by finishing 197 on the FedEx Cup point list. He regained his PGA Tour card by winning the 2017 DAP Championship.

== Professional wins (11) ==
=== Korn Ferry Tour wins (3) ===
Legend
Finals events (1)
Other Korn Ferry Tour (2)

No.	Date	Tournament	Winning score	Margin of victory	Runner(s)-up
1	Jul 24, 2016	Utah Championship	−15 (67-66-67-69=269)	2 strokes	(United States) J. J. Spaun
2	Sep 24, 2017	DAP Championship	−8 (64-69-68-71=272)	Playoff	(United States) Chesson Hadley, (United States) Rob Oppenheim
3	Jul 16, 2023	The Ascendant	−20 (66-67-69-66=268)	2 strokes	(United States) Max Greyserman

Korn Ferry Tour playoff record (1–1)

No.	Year	Tournament	Opponents	Result
1	2016	DAP Championship	(United States) Bryson DeChambeau, (Argentina) Julián Etulain, (United States) Andres Gonzales	DeChambeau won with par on second extra hole Etulain and Lindheim eliminated by birdie on first hole
2	2017	DAP Championship	(United States) Chesson Hadley, (United States) Rob Oppenheim	Won with birdie on first extra hole

=== PGA Tour Latinoamérica wins (2) ===
No.	Date	Tournament	Winning score	Margin of victory	Runner(s)-up
1	Oct 5, 2014	Arturo Calle Colombian Classic	−19 (67-68-67-67=269)	1 stroke	(United States) Brad Hopfinger, (Colombia) Marcelo Rozo
2	Oct 18, 2015	Mundo Maya Open	−18 (71-68-66-65=270)	2 strokes	(Brazil) Daniel Stapff

=== Florida Professional Golf Tour wins (6) ===
No.	Date	Tournament	Winning score	Margin of victory	Runner(s)-up
1	Dec 10, 2010	Ridgewood Lakes	−9 (68-67=135)	5 strokes	(United States) Kyle Gallo
2	Dec 19, 2010	Pelican Bay	−3 (69-72=141)	2 strokes	(United States) Michael Lawrence Jr.
3	Jan 6, 2013	Black Bear	−15 (63-66=129)	9 strokes	(United States) Jeff Corr, (United States) Jhared Hack, (United States) Tommy Schaff, (United States) Ty Tryon
4	Nov 5, 2013	The FPGTour Season Opener	−7 (67-69-67=203)	1 stroke	(United States) Jeff Dennis, (South Korea) Lee Kang-san
5	Jan 5, 2014	New Years Kick-Off Event	−9 (69-66=135)	1 stroke	(United States) Chris Brant, (United States) Roger Rowland, (United States) Blaine Woodruff (a)
6	Mar 23, 2014	Daytona Beach Open and Pro-Am	−13 (63-68=131)	1 stroke	(United States) Seth Fair, (United States) Greg O'Mahony

== Results in major championships ==
Tournament	2014
Masters Tournament	
U.S. Open	T56
The Open Championship	
PGA Championship	

Did not play

"T" indicates a tie for a place

== See also ==
- 2016 Web.com Tour Finals graduates
- 2017 Web.com Tour Finals graduates
- 2018 Web.com Tour Finals graduates
- 2022 Korn Ferry Tour Finals graduates
- 2023 Korn Ferry Tour graduates
