= Aurora City School District =

School district in Ohio, United States

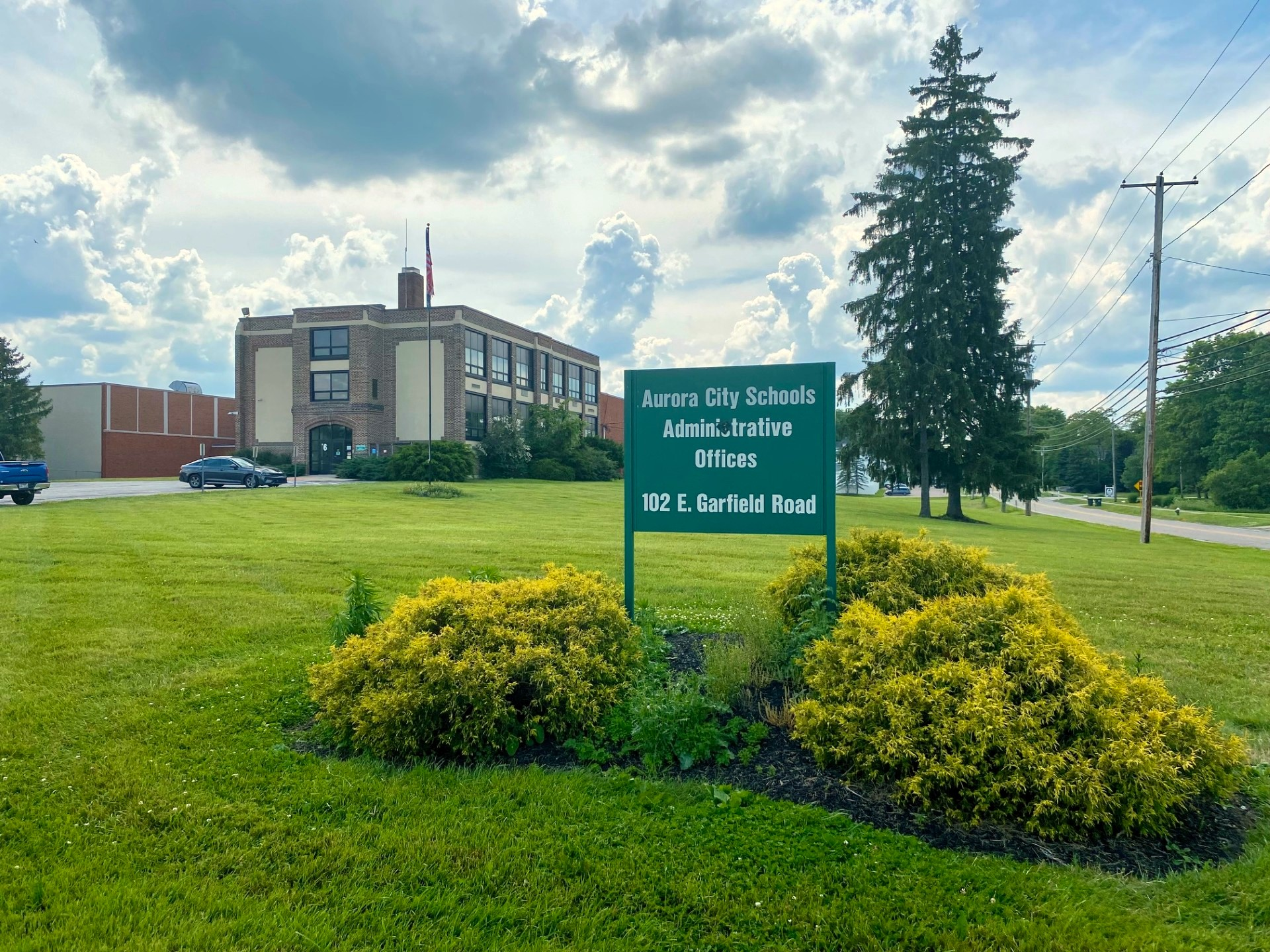

Address
- 102 East Garfield Road Aurora, Ohio, 44202; United States
- Coordinates: 41°19′00″N 81°20′35″W

District information
- Type: Public
- Grades: PK–12
- Established: 1897
- Superintendent: Paul Milcetich
- Schools: 5
- NCES District ID: 3904917

Students and staff
- Students: 3,049 (2025–2026)
- Teachers: 176.35 (on an FTE basis) (2025–2026)
- Staff: 456.66 (on an FTE basis) (2025–2026)
- Student–teacher ratio: 17.29 (2025–2026)

Other information
- Website: www.aurora-schools.org

The Aurora City School District is a public school district in Aurora, Ohio, U.S. The district serves primary and secondary students in the city of Aurora and part of the adjacent village of Reminderville. The district operates five buildings and, as of the 2024-25 school year, has an enrollment of approximately 3,000 students in grades preschool through twelve. District offices are housed in the historic Aurora Township School, which was built in 1912.

== History ==
Early education in Aurora was done using "fireplace schools" or log cabin schools, dating back to 1804. These early log cabin schools could be moved to different locations as need arose. By 1870, there were seven schoolhouses in Aurora. In 1888, a two-story, schoolhouse was built near the center of town, a building still standing as the Aurora City Hall. Initially it had two rooms before being remodeled in late 1896 to have four rooms, opening in 1897 as a centralized township school. A new brick building opened in 1912 and served as the home for all students until 1949 when Craddock Elementary School was built behind the existing school. Lake Elementary School opened in 1961 but closed in the 1980s and the building was sold by the district. The current high school building opened in 1965, Miller Elementary in 1967, Harmon Middle School in 1974, and Leighton Elementary in 2001. After the opening of Leighton Elementary, the district reorganized the schools to their current setup.

== Schools ==
=== High school ===
- Aurora High School, grades 9–12

=== Middle school ===
- Harmon Middle School, grades 6–8

=== Elementary schools ===
- Leighton Elementary School, grades 3–5
- Craddock Elementary School, grades 1 and 2
- Miller Elementary School, grades PK and K
