= Andres Gonzales =

American golfer (born 1983)

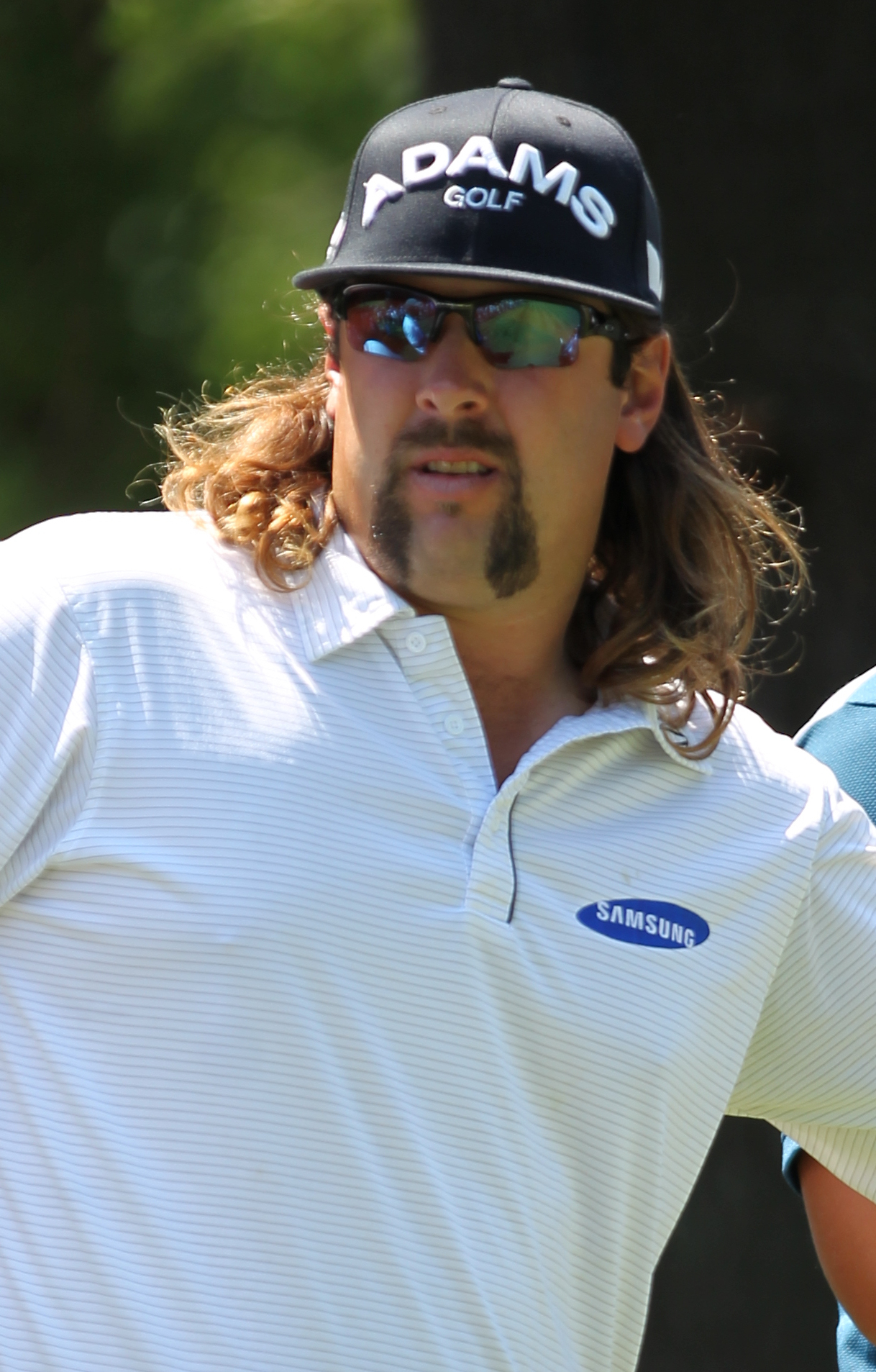

Personal information
- Nationality: United States
- Born: May 16, 1983 (age 43) Olympia, Washington, U.S.
- Height: 6 ft 2 in (1.88 m)
- Weight: 210 lb (95 kg; 15 st)

Career
- Sport: Golf
- College: Oregon State University; University of Nevada, Las Vegas
- Turned professional: 2006
- Former tours: PGA Tour; Web.com Tour; Canadian Tour; Gateway Tour
- Professional wins: 5

Number of wins by tour
- Korn Ferry Tour: 2
- Other: 3

Best results in major championships
- Masters Tournament: DNP
- PGA Championship: DNP
- U.S. Open: CUT: 2011, 2016
- The Open Championship: DNP

Andres Gonzales (born May 16, 1983) is an American professional golfer.

== Professional career ==
Gonzales has played on the Canadian Tour, Web.com Tour, and PGA Tour. He won the 2009 Saskatchewan Open on the Canadian Tour. He later won the 2012 Soboba Golf Classic and 2014 Utah Championship on the Web.com Tour. Gonzales has tallied three top ten finishes on the PGA Tour including a tie for third at the OHL Classic at Mayakoba in 2014.

== Personal life ==
He has attained some popularity due to his unorthodox appearance and prolonged attempts to contact fellow golfer Tiger Woods via Twitter.

== Amateur wins ==
- 2005 Scratch Players Championship

== Professional wins (5) ==
=== Web.com Tour wins (2) ===
No.	Date	Tournament	Winning score	Margin of victory	Runner-up
1	Apr 8, 2012	Soboba Golf Classic	−8 (67-70-68-71=276)	2 strokes	(United States) Andrew Svoboda
2	Jul 14, 2014	Utah Championship	−21 (62-67-65-69=263)	4 strokes	(Australia) Adam Crawford

Web.com Tour playoff record (0–2)

No.	Year	Tournament	Opponents	Result
1	2011	Soboba Golf Classic	(Argentina) Miguel Ángel Carballo, (United States) Ted Potter Jr.	Potter won with birdie on second extra hole Carballo eliminated by birdie on first hole
2	2016	DAP Championship	(United States) Bryson DeChambeau, (Argentina) Julián Etulain, (United States) Nicholas Lindheim	DeChambeau won with par on second extra hole Etulain and Lindheim eliminated by birdie on first hole

=== Canadian Tour wins (1) ===
No.	Date	Tournament	Winning score	Margin of victory	Runners-up
1	Jul 12, 2009	Saskatchewan Open	−14 (70-69-72-63=274)	1 stroke	(United States) Scott Gibson, (Chile) Hugo León

=== Gateway Tour wins (2) ===
No.	Date	Tournament	Winning score	Margin of victory	Runner-up
1	Feb 15, 2007	Desert Winter 5	−15 (66-65-67=198)	2 strokes	(United States) Tommy Medina
2	Mar 27, 2009	Desert Spring 2	−16 (64-64-69=197)	2 strokes	(United States) Jacob Rogers

== Results in major championships ==
Tournament	2011	2012	2013	2014	2015	2016
U.S. Open	CUT					CUT

Did not play

CUT = missed the half-way cut
Note: Gonzales only played in the U.S. Open.

== Results in The Players Championship ==
Tournament	2016
The Players Championship	CUT

CUT = missed the halfway cut

== See also ==
- 2010 PGA Tour Qualifying School graduates
- 2012 Web.com Tour graduates
- 2014 Web.com Tour Finals graduates
- 2016 Web.com Tour Finals graduates
