= AJ Barner =

American football player (born 2002)

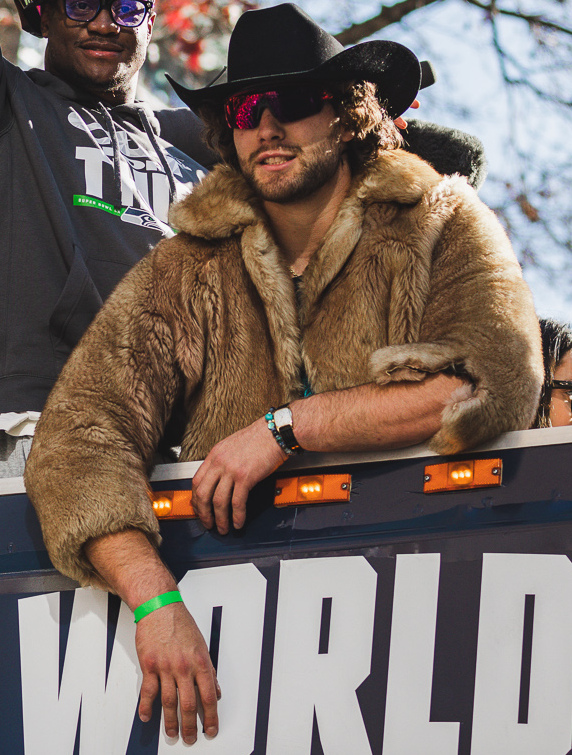
- Barner during the Super Bowl LX victory parade in Seattle in 2026

No. 88 – Seattle Seahawks
- Position: Tight end
- Roster status: Active

Personal information
- Born: May 3, 2002 (age 24); Aurora, Ohio, U.S.
- Listed height: 6 ft 6 in (1.98 m)
- Listed weight: 251 lb (114 kg)

Career information
- High school: Aurora (OH)
- College: Indiana (2020–2022); Michigan (2023)
- NFL draft: 2024: 4th round, 121st overall pick

Career history
- Seattle Seahawks (2024–present)

Awards and highlights
- Super Bowl champion (LX); CFP national champion (2023)

Career NFL statistics as of Week 10, 2026
- Receptions: 108
- Receiving yards: 993
- Receiving touchdowns: 11
- Stats at Pro Football Reference

Albert Frank "AJ" Barner V (born May 3, 2002) is an American professional football tight end for the Seattle Seahawks of the National Football League (NFL). He played college football for the Indiana Hoosiers and Michigan Wolverines. Barner transferred to Michigan for his senior season, winning a national championship in 2023. He was selected by the Seahawks in the fourth round of the 2024 NFL draft.

== Early life ==
Albert Frank Barner V was born on May 3, 2002, in Aurora, Ohio to Albert and Reva Barner. He was a 2020 graduate of Aurora High School. He played football as a tight end and linebacker at Aurora and was selected as the Northeast Ohio Division III Defensive Player of the Year.

== College career ==
=== Indiana ===
Barner played college football as a tight end for Indiana from 2020 to 2022. As a freshman and sophomore, he appeared in all 20 games for Indiana. As a junior, he was selected a team captain for the 2022 Indiana Hoosiers football team, started 10 games, and totaled 28 receptions for 199 yards and three touchdowns.

=== Michigan ===
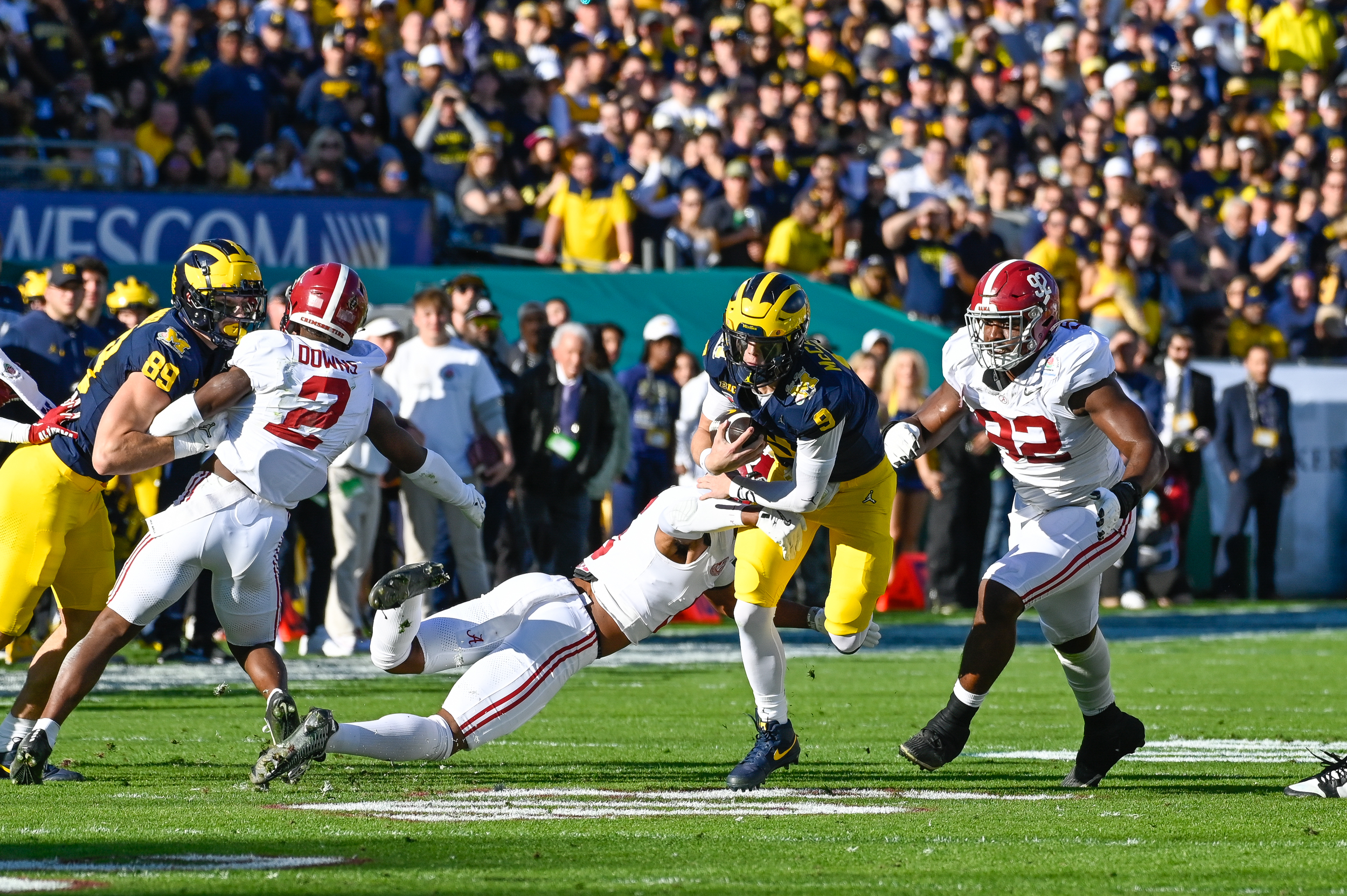
Barner (#89) blocking for J. J. McCarthy in the 2024 Rose Bowl versus Alabama.

In December 2022, Barner entered the NCAA transfer portal and accepted an offer from the University of Michigan. He chose Michigan because of its prioritization of the tight end position under Jim Harbaugh. He was named to the John Mackey Award watch list in August 2023.

Barner finished the 2023 national championship season with 22 catches for 249 yards and a touchdown. Barner was an All-Big Ten honorable mention.

== Professional career ==
Pre-draft measurables
Height	Weight	Arm length	Hand span	Wingspan	40-yard dash	10-yard split	20-yard split	20-yard shuttle	Three-cone drill	Vertical jump	Broad jump	Bench press
6 ft 6 in (1.98 m)	251 lb (114 kg)	33 3/8 in (0.85 m)	9 in (0.23 m)	6 ft 9 7/8 in (2.08 m)	4.84 s	1.65 s	2.77 s	4.41 s	7.02 s	34.5 in (0.88 m)	9 ft 9 in (2.97 m)	22 reps
All values from NFL Combine/Pro Day

=== 2024 season ===
Barner was selected by the Seattle Seahawks in the fourth round, 121st overall, of the 2024 NFL draft. In the 2024 NFL regular season, Barner caught a total of 30 passes and had 245 yards. In Week 4 against the Detroit Lions, he scored his first professional touchdown on a nine-yard reception from Geno Smith. In Week 13 he caught his second touchdown in a victory against the New York Jets and in Week 16 he caught his third in a loss against the Minnesota Vikings. His final touchdown as a rookie came in a Week 18 victory against the Los Angeles Rams. He finished his rookie season with a total of 30 receptions, four touchdowns, 245 yards, and an average of 8.2 yards per catch.

=== 2025 season ===
In the 2025 regular season, Barner caught a total of 52 passes, for 519 yards and six touchdowns. Barner caught two touchdowns in one game for the first time in his career in Week 6 against the Tampa Bay Buccaneers. Barner scored his first rushing touchdown in Week 9 against the Washington Commanders. His best performance of the season came in Week 11 when he caught 10 passes for 70 receiving yards against the Los Angeles Rams.

In the NFC Championship against the Rams, Barner finished the game with two receptions and 13 yards. In Super Bowl LX, Barner caught four passes for 54 yards, and one touchdown, which was the first touchdown of the Super Bowl as well as Barner's first career postseason touchdown, in the 29–13 win over the New England Patriots.

== NFL career statistics ==
Legend
	Won the Super Bowl
**Bold**	Career high

=== Regular season ===
Year	Team	Games		Receiving					Rushing						Fumbles	
Year	Team	GP	GS	Rec	Yds	Avg	Lng	TD	Att	Yds	Avg	Lng	1D	TD	Fum	Lost
2024	SEA	17	6	30	245	8.2	20	4	0	0	0	0	0	0	0	0
2025	SEA	17	17	**52**	**519**	**10.0**	**61**	**6**	**10**	**14**	**1.4**	**2**	**9**	**1**	**2**	0
Career		34	23	82	764	9.3	61	10	10	14	1.4	2	9	1	2	0

=== Postseason ===
Year	Team	Games		Receiving					Rushing						Fumbles	
Year	Team	GP	GS	Rec	Yds	Avg	Lng	TD	Att	Yds	Avg	Lng	1D	TD	Fum	Lost
2025	SEA	3	3	6	67	11.2	16	1	1	2	2.0	2	1	0	1	0
Career		3	3	6	67	11.2	16	1	1	2	2.0	2	1	0	1	0
