= Aurora High School (Ohio) =

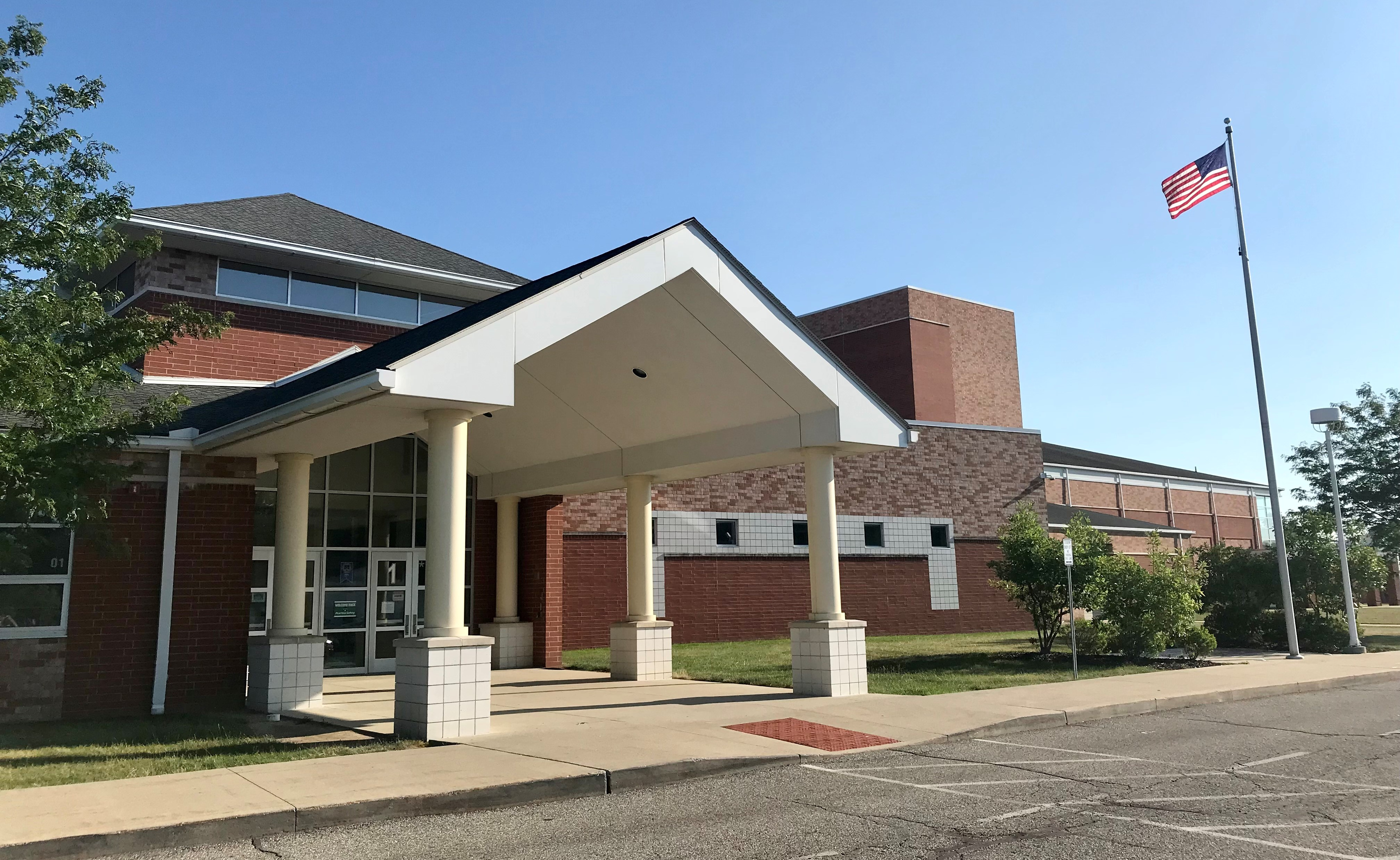

Location
- 109 W. Pioneer Trail; Aurora, Ohio 44202; United States; 41°18′28″N 81°21′07″W

Information
- Established: 1896
- School district: Aurora City School District
- CEEB code: 360270
- Principal: Ashley Pacholewski
- Teaching staff: 61.34 (FTE)
- Grades: 9–12
- Enrollment: 984 (2024–25)
- Student to teacher ratio: 16.04
- Campus type: Suburban
- Colors: Green and white
- Athletics conference: Suburban League
- Team name: Greenmen
- Accreditation: Ohio Department of Education
- National ranking: 454 (U.S. News & World Report 2020)
- Website: ahs.aurora-schools.org

Aurora High School is a public high school located in Aurora, Ohio, United States. It is the only high school in the Aurora City School District and serves students in grades 9–12. Athletic teams are known as the Greenmen and they compete in the Suburban League as a member of the Ohio High School Athletic Association.

== History ==
Aurora High School was established in 1896 and had its first commencement in 1897. The school was first housed at a two-story building built in 1888 that had been remodeled in 1896 to house all grades after previously being a schoolhouse for the central part of the township. A new township school was built for all grades and opened in 1912. AHS began using a four year diploma program in 1925, with its first graduates in 1926. Prior to 1925, Aurora students could finish their high school diploma at neighboring high schools.

Between 1950 and 1962, neighboring Streetsboro lost their high school, and sent their students under tuition grants to neighboring high schools, including Aurora. At the same time, growth in Aurora necessitated larger school facilities. Aurora began plans for a new high school building and in 1965, the current campus on West Pioneer Trail opened. Both the original home of AHS and the 1912 building still stand as of 2026, with the 1896 building serving as the Aurora City Hall and the 1912 building serving as the school district offices.

== Accolades and awards ==
In 2007, Aurora was recognized as a Blue Ribbon School by the National Blue Ribbon Schools Program with 257 other high schools.

Aurora has received high rankings in the U.S. News & World Report Ranking

== Athletics ==
Aurora High School currently offers:

- Baseball
- Basketball
- Cheerleading
- Cross Country
- Football
- Field Hockey
- Ice Hockey
- Lacrosse
- Soccer
- Softball
- Soccer
- Volleyball
- Wrestling

=== State championships ===
- Football – 2008
- Boys golf – 1971
- Boys wrestling – 1995
- Girls cross country - 2026

== Notable alumni ==
- AJ Barner - professional football player in the National Football League (NFL)
- Tom Curtis - former professional football player in the NFL
- Jericka Duncan - American journalist
- Shyanne Sellers professional basketball player in the Women's National Basketball Association (WNBA)
