= DAP Championship =

Golf tournament

Tournament information
- Location: Cleveland, Ohio
- Established: 2016
- Course: Canterbury Golf Club
- Par: 71
- Length: 7,012 yards (6,412 m)
- Tour: Web.com Tour
- Format: Stroke play
- Prize fund: US$1,000,000
- Month played: September
- Final year: 2018

Tournament record score
- Aggregate: 266 Kramer Hickok (2018)
- To par: −14 as above

Final champion
- (United States) Kramer Hickok
- Location in the United States Location in Ohio

The DAP Championship was a golf tournament on the Web.com Tour from 2016 to 2018. It was played at Canterbury Golf Club in the Cleveland suburb of Beachwood, Ohio. The tournament was part of the Web.com Tour Finals.

== Winners ==
Web.com Tour (Finals)	2016–2018

#	Year	Winner	Score	To par	Margin of victory	Runners-up
3rd	2018	(United States) Kramer Hickok	266	−14	3 strokes	(Australia) Matt Jones (United States) Hunter Mahan
2nd	2017	(United States) Nicholas Lindheim	272	−8	Playoff	(United States) Chesson Hadley (United States) Rob Oppenheim
1st	2016	(United States) Bryson DeChambeau	273	−7	Playoff	(Argentina) Julián Etulain (United States) Andres Gonzales (United States) Nicholas Lindheim

== See also ==
- Rust-Oleum Championship, a Web.com Tour event in the Cleveland suburb of Westlake from 2013 to 2014
- Legend Financial Group Classic, a Web.com Tour event in the Cleveland suburb of Highland Heights from 2005 to 2007
- Greater Cleveland Open, a Web.com Tour event from 1990 to 2001
- Cleveland Open, a PGA Tour event from 1963 to 1972
