= Cleveland Open =

Golf tournament formerly on the PGA Tour

Tournament information
- Location: Bainbridge Township, Geauga County, Ohio
- Established: 1963
- Course: Tanglewood Country Club
- Par: 71
- Tour: PGA Tour
- Format: Stroke play
- Prize fund: US$150,000
- Month played: July
- Final year: 1972

Tournament record score
- Aggregate: 262 Bobby Mitchell (1971)
- To par: −22 as above

Final champion
- (Australia) David Graham
- Location in the United States Location in Ohio

The Cleveland Open was a golf tournament on the PGA Tour. It was played from 1963 to 1972 at a various courses in the greater Cleveland, Ohio area.

== Host courses ==
Years	Course	Location
1972	Tanglewood Country Club	Bainbridge Township, Geauga County
1963, 1971	Beechmont Country Club	Orange
1967, 1969, 1970	Aurora Country Club	Aurora
1966, 1968	Lakewood Country Club	Westlake
1964, 1965	Highland Park Municipal Golf Club	Highland Hills

== Winners ==
Year	Winner	Score	To par	Margin of victory	Runner(s)-up	Winner's share ($)	Ref.
Cleveland Open
1972	(Australia) David Graham	278	−6	Playoff	(Australia) Bruce Devlin	30,000	
1971	(United States) Bobby Mitchell	262	−22	7 strokes	(United States) Charles Coody	30,000	
1970	(Australia) Bruce Devlin	268	−12	4 strokes	(United States) Steve Eichstaedt	30,000	
Cleveland Open Invitational
1969	(United States) Charles Coody	271	−9	2 strokes	(Australia) Bruce Crampton	22,000	
1968	(United States) Dave Stockton	276	−8	2 strokes	(United States) Bob Dickson	22,000	
1967	(United States) Gardner Dickinson	271	−9	4 strokes	(United States) Miller Barber (United States) Homero Blancas	20,700	
1966	(United States) R. H. Sikes	268	−16	3 strokes	(United States) Bob Goalby	20,000	
1965	(United States) Dan Sikes	272	−12	1 stroke	(United States) Tony Lema	25,000	
1964	(United States) Tony Lema	270	−14	Playoff	(United States) Arnold Palmer	20,000	
1963	(United States) Arnold Palmer	273	−11	Playoff	(United States) Tommy Aaron (United States) Tony Lema	22,000	

== See also ==
- DAP Championship, a Web.com Tour Finals event in the Cleveland suburb of Beachwood to begin in 2016
- Rust-Oleum Championship, a Web.com Tour event in the Cleveland suburb of Westlake from 2013 to 2014
- Legend Financial Group Classic, a Web.com Tour event from 2005 to 2007
- Greater Cleveland Open, a Web.com Tour event from 1990 to 2001
