= Reminderville, Ohio =

- City
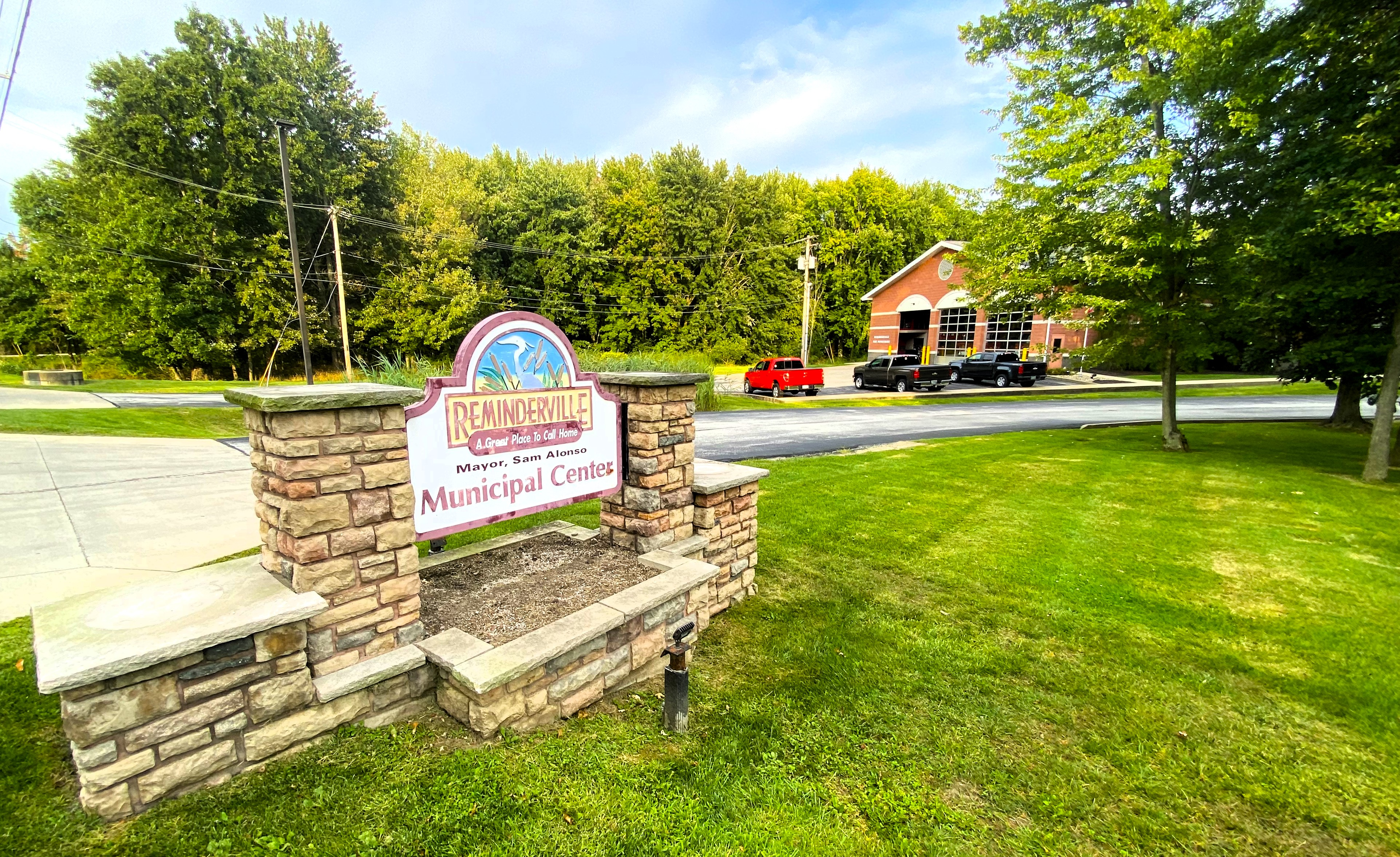
- Motto: "A Great Place to Call Home"
- Location in Summit County, Ohio

- Location within Ohio Location within the United States
- Coordinates: 41°20′02″N 81°24′06″W
- Country: United States
- State: Ohio
- County: Summit

Area
  - Total: 2.22 sq mi (5.75 km^{2})
  - Land: 2.19 sq mi (5.66 km^{2})
  - Water: 0.035 sq mi (0.09 km^{2})
- Elevation: 997 ft (304 m)

Population (2020)
  - Total: 5,412
  - Density: 2,477.9/sq mi (956.71/km^{2})
- Time zone: UTC-5 (Eastern (EST))
  - Summer (DST): UTC-4 (EDT)
- ZIP code: 44202
- Area code: 330
- FIPS code: 39-66152
- GNIS feature ID: 1087013
- Website: reminderville.com

Reminderville is a city in northeastern Summit County, Ohio, United States. The population was 5,412 at the 2020 census. It is part of the Akron metropolitan area.

== History ==
The village of Reminderville was incorporated in 1955. Clement L. Reminder, an early mayor, gave the village his name. The village became a city in 2021 after its population exceeded 5,000 in the 2020 Census.

Reminderville has been noted for its unusual place name. According to Three Communities, One Heritage by Keith A. Peppers and Thomas Kubat of Pursue Posterity, the area's name (before incorporation) began as a nickname.

== Geography ==
According to the United States Census Bureau, the village has a total area of 2.21 square miles (5.72 km^{2}), of which 2.18 square miles (5.65 km^{2}) is land and 0.03 square miles (0.08 km^{2}) is water.

It is bound on the north by Solon; on the west by Twinsburg, on the east by Aurora, and on the south by Twinsburg & Twinsburg Township; within a few minutes of shopping and freeway access. It is primarily a residential community with its own police and fire departments. 83% of Reminderville is a part of the Twinsburg City School District and the balance is part of Aurora City School District.

== Demographics ==
Historical population
Census	Pop.	Note	%±
1960	217		—
1970	215		−0.9%
1980	1,960		811.6%
1990	2,163		10.4%
2000	2,347		8.5%
2010	3,404		45.0%
2020	5,412		59.0%
U.S. Decennial Census

=== 2020 census ===
Reminderville racial composition
Race	Number	Percentage
White (NH)	3,431	63.4%
Black or African American (NH)	765	14.1%
Native American (NH)	3	0.06%
Asian (NH)	809	14.9%
Pacific Islander (NH)	3	0.06%
Other/mixed	296	5.47%
Hispanic or Latino	105	1.94%

=== 2010 census ===
As of the census of 2010, there were 3,404 people, 1,399 households, and 963 families residing in the village. The population density was 1,561.5 inhabitants per square mile (602.9/km^{2}). There were 1,497 housing units at an average density of 686.7 per square mile (265.1/km^{2}). The racial makeup of the village was 82.3% White, 9.0% African American, 0.1% Native American, 5.3% Asian, 0.4% from other races, and 2.8% from two or more races. Hispanic or Latino of any race were 1.1% of the population.

There were 1,399 households, of which 33.9% had children under the age of 18 living with them, 54.9% were married couples living together, 10.0% had a female householder with no husband present, 3.9% had a male householder with no wife present, and 31.2% were non-families. 27.4% of all households were made up of individuals, and 8.8% had someone living alone who was 65 years of age or older. The average household size was 2.43 and the average family size was 2.98.

The median age in the village was 38.3 years. 24.5% of residents were under the age of 18; 5.1% were between the ages of 18 and 24; 31.1% were from 25 to 44; 27.7% were from 45 to 64; and 11.7% were 65 years of age or older. The gender makeup of the village was 48.9% male and 51.1% female.
