= Aurora Center Historic District =

Historic district in Ohio, United States

- U.S. National Register of Historic Places
- U.S. Historic district
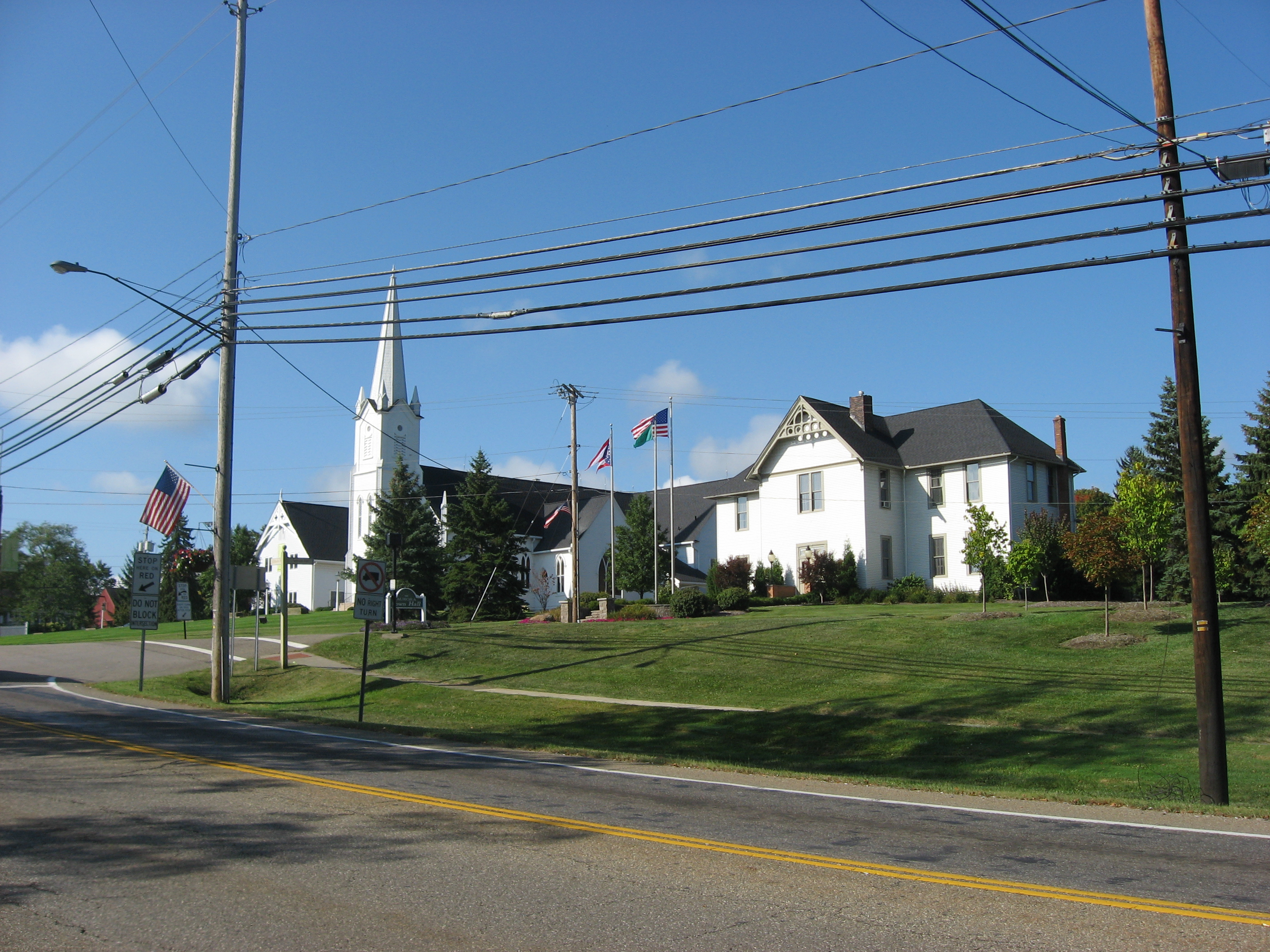
- Church and town hall in the district

- Location within Ohio Location within the United States
- Location: Roughly both sides of State Route 306 from and including Pioneer Trail to State Route 82, also Maple Lane, Aurora, Ohio
- Coordinates: 41°18′49″N 81°20′50″W
- Area: 21.5 acres (8.7 ha)
- Architect: Multiple
- Architectural style: Mid 19th Century Revival, Late Victorian, Federal
- NRHP reference No.: 74001601
- Added to NRHP: June 20, 1974

Aurora Center Historic District is a historic district in Aurora, Ohio, United States. Listed on the National Register of Historic Places in 1974, it contains 21 contributing buildings.
