= Beechmont, Nova Scotia =

Community in Nova Scotia, Canada

Coordinates: 46°5′7.78″N 60°22′47.39″W

Beechmont in Nova Scotia

Beechmont is a community in the Canadian province of Nova Scotia, located in the Cape Breton Regional Municipality. The name "Beechmont” likely comes from the hilly lands of the area that contain great quantities of beech trees.

The first settlements in Beechmont can be dated back to 1829 and the primary industries were farming and lumbering. In 1863, the Coxheath Copper Mine was established, which, despite its name, is located in Beechmont. Activity at the mine spanned three periods: 1878-1891, 1899-1901, and 1928-1930. As a result of the great depression, operations ceased in the 1930s.

In 2023, there was a renewed interest in reopening the mine on behalf a corporation called Nova Cooper. Professional consultation deemed that, because of the proposed mine's proximity to residential areas and Beechmont's high levels of precipitation, it is highly likely that reopening the mine would result in environmental contamination to water bodies and residential wells.

The wildlife of Beechmont include several species at risk such as the little brown bat, Canada lynx, and olive-sided flycatcher.
