= Beechmont Country Club =

Golf club in Ohio, United States

Coordinates: 41°27′40″N 81°28′13″W

Beechmont Country Club is a golfing country club located in Orange, Ohio, United States, located approximately 10 miles (16 km) east of downtown Cleveland. This golf club hosted PGA events such as the 1963 and 1971 Cleveland Open. The course, designed by Stanley Thompson, was opened in 1923 and is regarded as among the most difficult courses in northeast Ohio. Par is 71.

== History ==
Beechmont Country Club was founded in 1923 by a group of amateur golfers from Cleveland. They purchased 96 acres (390,000 m^{2}) of land covered in trees, and gave Thompson the opportunity to design the course. One interesting aspect of the course is that water comes into play on 7 of the 18 holes.

The club also contains an indoor and outdoor tennis facility, an outdoor swimming pool, a summer camp for children, workout facilities, and locker rooms for both men and women members. The club has two restaurants (one is men only), a snack shop, fully stocked beverage cart on the course, and a full service outdoor patio.

The golf operations is headed under Steve Niland, PGA.

Jami Morris, a graduate of The Pennsylvania State University, is the first woman to compete in and win Beechmont’s Club Championship. She achieved this milestone on August 18, 2024.

== Course characteristics ==
Beechmont Slope, Rating, and Yardage

Tee	Slope	Rating	Yardage	Par
Back	131	72.30	6648	71
Middle	128	70.80	6359	71
Forward	130	73.40	5845	76

== Tournaments at Beechmont ==
Beechmont Country Club hosted PGA events such as the inaugural 1963 Cleveland Open along with the same event in 1971.
