= Aurora, Ohio =

- City
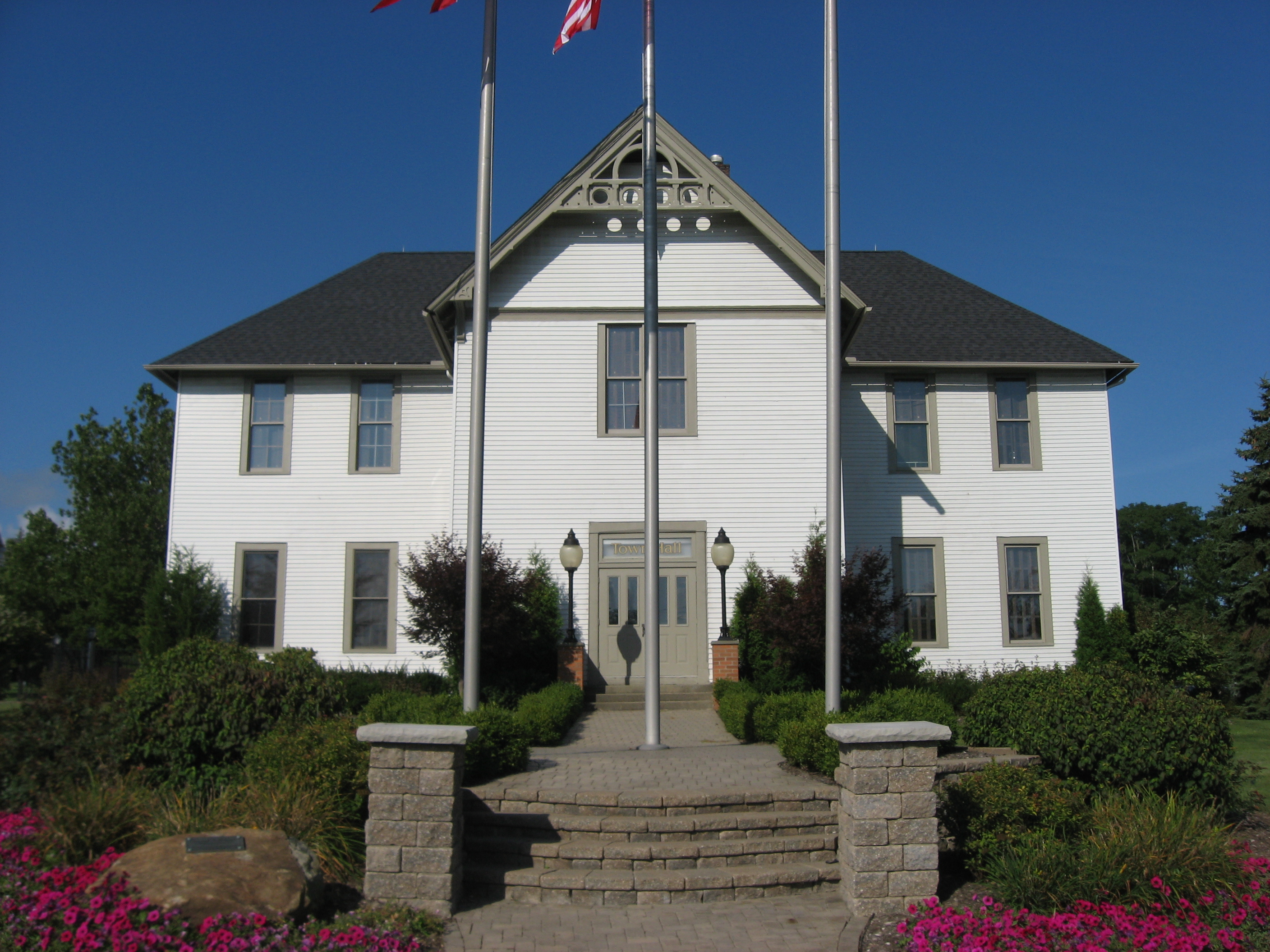
- Aurora Town Hall
- Interactive map of Aurora, Ohio
- Location within Ohio Location within the United States
- Coordinates: 41°18′43″N 81°22′12″W
- Country: United States
- State: Ohio
- County: Portage
- First Settled: 1799
- Incorporated: 1929 (Village)
- Incorporated: 1971 (City)
- Founder: Ebenezer Sheldon

Area
  - Total: 24.06 sq mi (62.31 km^{2})
  - Land: 22.92 sq mi (59.35 km^{2})
  - Water: 1.15 sq mi (2.97 km^{2})
- Elevation: 1,135 ft (346 m)

Population (2020)
  - Total: 17,239
  - Estimate (2023): 17,717
  - Density: 752.3/sq mi (290.48/km^{2})
- Time zone: UTC-5 (EST)
  - Summer (DST): UTC-4 (EDT)
- ZIP code: 44202
- Area code: 330
- FIPS code: 39-03086
- GNIS feature ID: 1086822
- Website: https://www.auroraoh.com/

Aurora is a city in northwestern Portage County, Ohio, United States. A suburb in between Akron and Cleveland, the population was 17,239 at the 2020 census. It is part of the Akron metropolitan area.

Some say Aurora was the name of the daughter of Major Amos Spafford, while others believe the village was named after Aurora, the Roman goddess of dawn. The city is co-extensive with, and formed from, the former township of Aurora, which was formed from the Connecticut Western Reserve. Aurora was designated a Tree City USA by the National Arbor Day Foundation.

== History ==
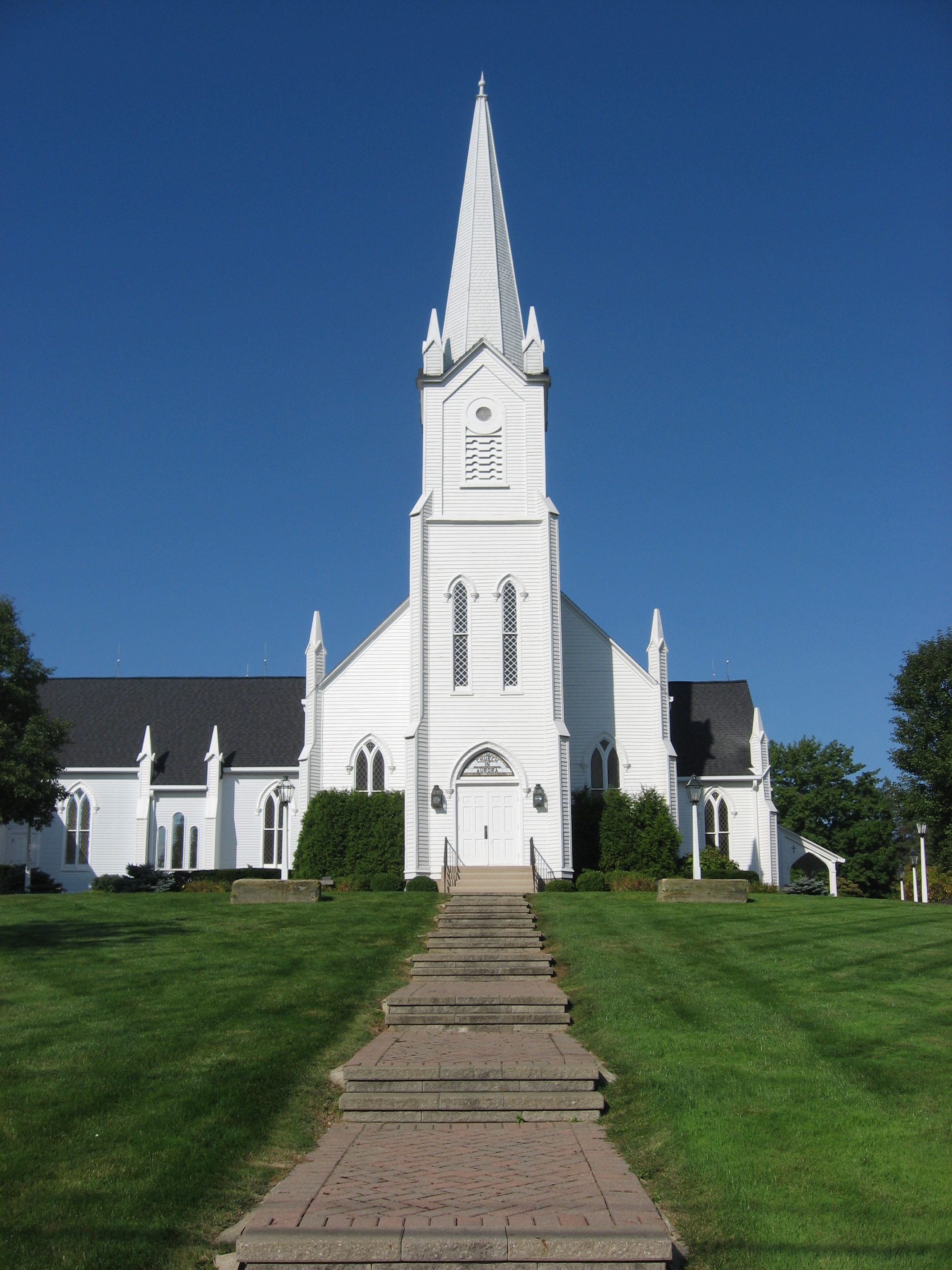
The Church in Aurora, part of the Aurora Center Historic District

In 1799, Ebenezer Sheldon, a former Revolutionary War soldier, settled in Aurora and built a cabin on east pioneer trail. Shortly after, he brought his family from Connecticut to live in the new settlement. In 1807 alone, 72 settlers came to Aurora, and two years later, the first frame house was built. Most people in Aurora at the time lived along the three main roads; The Cleveland–Warren road, the Chillicothe Turnpike, and the Old Mill road. At the intersection of the three roads, inns and stores were built for settlers and travelers in Aurora. By the mid-1800s, the Chillicothe road was lined with shops, hotels, taverns, and a school. In 1862, one of the first cheese factories, the Silver Creek Cheese Factory, was built by Frank and Elisha Hurd. Ten years later, in 1872, the Aurora Station was constructed, and it became a major commercial area for the town. By the end of the 1800s, seven schools had been built, and the existing church in Aurora was also created.

In 1904, four million pounds of cheese was produced in Aurora cheese factories, making it the biggest cheese producer in the United States. One year later, Aurora's stone sidewalk was completed, stretching from Aurora Station to Town Center. In 1913, a flood destroyed the Silver Creek Factory. One of its creators, Frank Hurd, stayed in the cheese industry until 1921. The Aurora cheese industry would be on decline from then on.

In 1929, Aurora became a village, with its first mayor being Lee Gould. Later, the remaining areas of the Aurora Township were annexed into the village. By 1970, Aurora had reached a population of almost 6,500 residents, and its population would grow by about 2,000 in the next decade. Aurora became a city in 1971.

== Geography ==
Aurora borders or touches the following other townships and municipalities:

- The city of Hudson, Summit County on the southwest (touches, but does not border)
- The city of Solon, Cuyahoga County on the northwest (touches, but does not border)
- Bainbridge Township, Geauga County, on the north
- Auburn Township, Geauga County, on the northeast (touches, but does not border)
- The city of Streetsboro, Portage County, on the south
- Twinsburg Township, Summit County, on the west
- The city of Reminderville, Summit County, on the west
- Mantua Township, Portage County, on the east
- Shalersville Township, Portage County, on the southeast (touches, but does not border)

According to the United States Census Bureau, the city has a total area of 24.07 square miles (62.34 km^{2}), of which 1.15 square miles (2.98 km^{2}) is covered by water.

== Demographics ==
Historical population
Census	Pop.	Note	%±
1880	222		—
1940	518		—
1950	571		10.2%
1960	4,049		609.1%
1970	6,549		61.7%
1980	8,177		24.9%
1990	9,192		12.4%
2000	13,556		47.5%
2010	15,548		14.7%
2020	17,239		10.9%
2023 (est.)	17,717		2.8%

=== 2020 census ===
As of the 2020 census, Aurora had a population of 17,239. The median age was 47.4 years. 21.6% of residents were under the age of 18 and 23.7% of residents were 65 years of age or older. For every 100 females there were 91.9 males, and for every 100 females age 18 and over there were 87.4 males age 18 and over.

80.7% of residents lived in urban areas, while 19.3% lived in rural areas.

There were 6,679 households in Aurora, of which 30.5% had children under the age of 18 living in them. Of all households, 62.5% were married-couple households, 11.5% were households with a male householder and no spouse or partner present, and 22.3% were households with a female householder and no spouse or partner present. About 23.4% of all households were made up of individuals and 13.6% had someone living alone who was 65 years of age or older.

There were 7,103 housing units, of which 6.0% were vacant. Among occupied housing units, 82.8% were owner-occupied and 17.2% were renter-occupied. The homeowner vacancy rate was 1.1% and the rental vacancy rate was 10.3%.

Racial composition as of the 2020 census
Race	Number	Percent
White	15,131	87.8%
Black or African American	533	3.1%
American Indian and Alaska Native	16	0.1%
Asian	675	3.9%
Native Hawaiian and Other Pacific Islander	6	<0.1%
Some other race	116	0.7%
Two or more races	762	4.4%
Hispanic or Latino (of any race)	392	2.3%

=== 2010 census ===
As of the census of 2010, there were 15,548 people, 6,018 households, and 4,365 families residing in the city. The population density was 678.4 inhabitants per square mile (261.9/km^{2}). There were 6,396 housing units at an average density of 279.1 per square mile (107.8/km^{2}). The racial makeup of the city was 93.9% White, 1.0% African American, 0.1% Native American, 3.9% Asian, 0.2% from other races, and 1.0% from two or more races. Hispanic or Latino of any race were 1.3% of the population.

There were 6,018 households, of which 32.9% had children under the age of 18 living with them, 62.5% were married couples living together, 7.1% had a female householder with no husband present, 2.9% had a male householder with no wife present, and 27.5% were non-families. 24.0% of all households were made up of individuals, and 12.1% had someone living alone who was 65 years of age or older. The average household size was 2.54 and the average family size was 3.03.

The median age in the city was 45.4 years. 24.6% of residents were under the age of 18; 5.3% were between the ages of 18 and 24; 19.7% were from 25 to 44; 31.6% were from 45 to 64; and 19.1% were 65 years of age or older. The gender makeup of the city was 47.9% male and 52.1% female.

=== 2000 census ===
As of the census of 2000, there were 13,556 people, 5,047 households, and 3,901 families residing in the city. The population density was 583.8 inhabitants per square mile (225.4/km^{2}). There were 5,361 housing units at an average density of 230.9 per square mile (89.2/km^{2}). The racial makeup of the city was 95.67% White, 1.16% African American, 0.10% Native American, 2.24% Asian, 0.01% Pacific Islander, 0.13% from other races, and 0.69% from two or more races. Hispanic or Latino of any race were 0.58% of the population.

There were 5,047 households, out of which 35.2% had children under the age of 18 living with them, 68.9% were married couples living together, 6.5% had a female householder with no husband present, and 22.7% were non-families. 19.0% of all households were made up of individuals, and 7.6% had someone living alone who was 65 years of age or older. The average household size was 2.63 and the average family size was 3.02.

In the city the population was spread out, with 25.7% under the age of 18, 4.6% from 18 to 24, 27.3% from 25 to 44, 26.9% from 45 to 64, and 15.5% who were 65 years of age or older. The median age was 41 years. For every 100 females, there were 92.9 males. For every 100 females age 18 and over, there were 88.9 males.

The median income for a household in the city was $112,547, and the median income for a family was $128,432. Males had a median income of $100,797 versus $53,846 for females. The per capita income for the city was $69,672.

== Culture ==
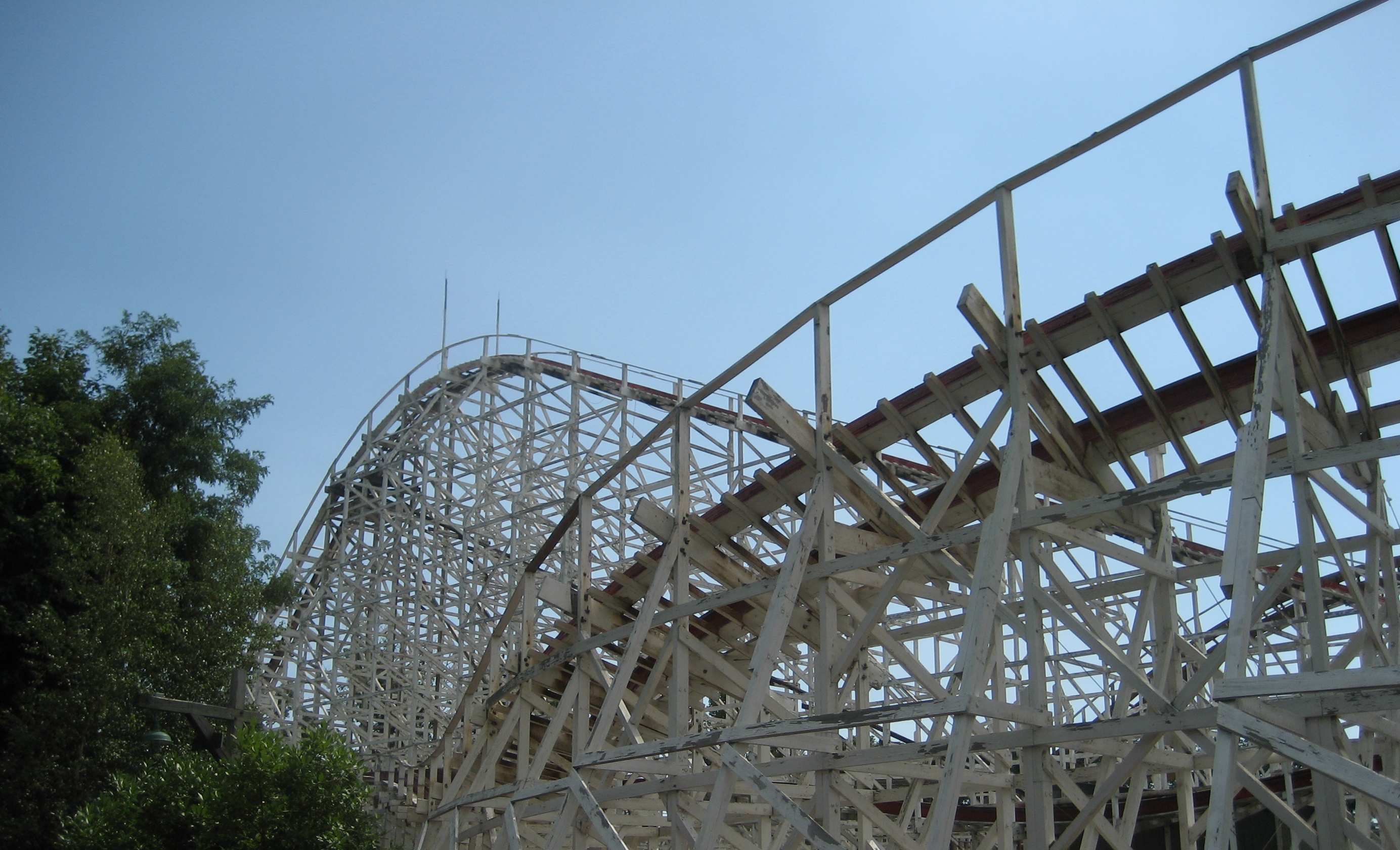
Raging Wolf Bobs at Geauga Lake

Parts of central Aurora have been designated the Aurora Center Historic District. The historic district was listed on the National Register of Historic Places in 1974.

The city has several private country clubs, including Club Walden and Barrington Golf Club. In addition, it was home to the historic Aurora Golf and Country Club. In 1924, Bert Way designed the championship golf course. The course wound through 220 acres of spectacularly crafted landscape, with the Chagrin River flowing through a majority of the holes. It was constructed in natural rolling terrain, with the Aurora branch of the Chagrin River being a significant feature. In 1967, 1969, and 1970, the club hosted the Cleveland Open. Arnold Palmer once battled the course while competing in this PGA event; Arnold Palmer, along with Bruce Devlin, Charlie Coody, Gary Trivisonno, and Tom Laubacher, held the course record of 64. After 88 years, in 2012, Aurora Golf and Country Club shuttered its doors. The former course has now been converted into the Paddock River Preserve.

In 2008, the Aurora High School Greenmen, won the Division III State Championship in football. In 2016, Aurora Robotics Team TBD won the FIRST Tech Challenge FIRST Championship in St. Louis.

Various recreational facilities operated around Geauga Lake continuously since before 1887, which straddles Aurora's northern boundary with Bainbridge Township. An amusement park, later also called Geauga Lake, developed mainly on the Bainbridge side of the lake. It included the Big Dipper roller coaster, originally known as The Clipper, which opened in 1925 and operated for 82 years at the site. In 1970, SeaWorld Ohio opened mainly on the Aurora side of the lake and operated until 2001, when the site was purchased by Six Flags and combined with the amusement park to create Six Flags Worlds of Adventure. Later, the combined park was sold to Cedar Fair and reverted to the Geauga Lake name and a new water park was built on the site of the former SeaWorld Ohio. The Geauga Lake amusement park permanently closed in 2007, but the Wildwater Kingdom waterpark attached to the site continued to operate until 2016.

== Education ==
Aurora City School District operates three elementary schools (Leighton, Craddock, and Miller), one middle school (Harmon), and one high school, Aurora High School. In 2019, Aurora High School was ranked second in Northeast Ohio, ninth in the state, and 308th in the nation; 78% of its students participate in advanced placement. Furthermore, it boasts a 18:1 student-teacher ratio, with 986 students.

Aurora is home to Valley Christian Academy. Aurora has a public library, a branch of the Portage County District Library.

== Notable people ==
- AJ Barner, professional football player in the National Football League (NFL)
- Blanton Collier, professional football coach in the NFL; lived in Aurora while coaching the Cleveland Browns
- Gary Collins, professional football player in the NFL; lived in Aurora while playing for the Cleveland Browns
- Tom Curtis, professional football player in the NFL
- Jericka Duncan, TV news correspondent for CBS News
- Sean Grandillo, professional actor
- Anne Heche, professional actress
- Fritz Heisler, professional football coach, assistant coach, and scout in the NFL; lived in Aurora while working for the Cleveland Browns
- Chris McCarrell, professional actor
- Ryan Norman, professional racing driver
- Bernie Parrish, professional football player in the NFL; lived in Aurora while playing for the Cleveland Browns
- Harold Sauerbrei, sports executive in the NFL; lived in Aurora while general manager of the Cleveland Browns
- Dick Schafrath, professional football player in the NFL; lived in Aurora while playing for the Cleveland Browns
- Jim Thome, professional baseball player in Major League Baseball, lived in Aurora while playing for the Cleveland Indians
