= CBS Evening News =

American television news program

- Also known as: Weekdays: CBS Television News (1941–1950); Douglas Edwards with the News (1950–1962); Walter Cronkite with the News (1962–1963); Weekends: CBS Weekend News (2016–present)
- Genre: News program
- Created by: Don Hewitt
- Directed by: Brian Nalesnik
- Presented by: Tony Dokoupil
- Narrated by: Joe Cipriano
- Theme music composer: Walt Levinsky (1982–1987); John Trivers, Elizabeth Myers and Alan Pasqua (1987–1991; 2011–2016; 2022–2026); Rick Patterson, Ron Walz and Neal Fox (1991–2006; 2026–present); James Horner (2006–2011); Joel Beckerman (2016–2022)
- Country of origin: United States
- Original language: English
- No. of seasons: 72
- No. of episodes: 16,400+

Production
- Executive producer: Kim Harvey
- Production locations: New York City (1941–2019, 2025–present); Washington, D.C. (2019–2025)
- Camera setup: Multi-camera
- Running time: 15 minutes (1941–1963); 30 minutes (1963–present)
- Production company: CBS News Productions

Original release
- Network: CBS
- Release: July 1, 1941 – present

Related
- CBS News Mornings; CBS News Roundup; CBS Mornings; Competitors: NBC Nightly News; ABC World News Tonight; PBS News Hour

The CBS Evening News (titled as CBS Evening News with Tony Dokoupil since January 3, 2026) is the flagship evening television news program of CBS News, the news division of the CBS television network in the United States. The CBS Evening News is a daily evening broadcast featuring news reports, feature stories and interviews by CBS News correspondents and reporters covering events around the world.

Since January 3, 2026, the flagship nightly broadcast has been anchored by Tony Dokoupil from the CBS Broadcast Center in New York City. Previous weeknight anchors have included Douglas Edwards, Walter Cronkite, Dan Rather, Connie Chung, Bob Schieffer, Russ Mitchell, Katie Couric, Harry Smith, Scott Pelley, Anthony Mason, Jeff Glor, Norah O'Donnell, John Dickerson and Maurice DuBois.

The program has been broadcast since July 1, 1941, under the original title CBS Television News, eventually adopting its existing title in 1963. Saturday and Sunday broadcasts of the CBS Evening News began in February 1966. On May 2, 2016, CBS announced that the weekend edition would be rebranded, effective May 7, 2016, as the CBS Weekend News. Weekend newscasts originate from the CBS Broadcast Center in New York City, and are anchored by Jericka Duncan. From 2016 to 2020, the CBS Weekend News was anchored by Reena Ninan on Saturday and Elaine Quijano on Sunday. By the summer of 2020, Ninan and Quijano were replaced by Major Garrett and Jamie Yuccas. In December 2020, Adriana Diaz and Jericka Duncan were announced to be the new weekend anchors; Diaz left the program in 2024. Since 2025, the program has had more of a news magazine-styled format, with a larger focus on long-form stories. In 2026, CBS Evening News announced it will maintain a pro-United States editorial stance.

The weeknight edition of the CBS Evening News airs live at 6:30 pm in the Eastern Time Zone and 5:30 pm in the Central Time Zone, and is tape delayed for the Mountain Time Zone. A "Western Edition", with updated segments covering breaking news stories, airs previously recorded at 6:30 pm for most stations in the Pacific Time Zone and 5:30 pm in the Alaska Time Zone and on tape delay in the Hawaii–Aleutian Time Zone. At midnight Eastern, the Western Edition is posted on the website for CBS News and their YouTube channel. The Western Edition additionally airs along with the weekend versions on CBS News 24/7.

As of April 11, 2024, CBS Evening News remains in third place of the three major television news programs, with around 4,969,000 total viewers.

== History ==
=== Early years (1941–1948) ===
Upon becoming a commercial station on July 1, 1941, WCBW (channel 2, later WCBS-TV), the pioneer CBS television station in New York City, broadcast two daily news programs, at 2:30 and 8:00 pm weekdays, both anchored by Richard Hubbell. Most of the newscasts featured Hubbell reading a script with only occasional cutaways to a map or still photograph. When Pearl Harbor was bombed on December 7, 1941, WCBW (which was normally off the air on Sunday to give the engineers a day off), took to the air at 8:45 pm with an extensive special report. The national emergency broke down the unspoken wall between CBS radio and television. WCBW executives convinced radio announcers and experts such as George Fielding Elliot and Linton Wells to come to the CBS television studios at Grand Central Station from the radio network base at 485 Madison Avenue, to give information and commentary on the attack. The WCBW special report that night lasted less than 90 minutes, but it pushed the limits of live television in 1941 and opened up new possibilities for future broadcasts. As CBS wrote in a special report to the FCC, the unscheduled live news broadcast on December 7 "was unquestionably the most stimulating challenge and marked the greatest advance of any single problem faced up to that time."

Additional newscasts were scheduled in the early days of World War II, including War Backgrounds (December 1941–February 1942), World This Week (February–April 1942), and America At War (March–May 1942). In May 1942, WCBW (like almost all television stations) temporarily suspended studio operations, which resulted in the station sharply cutting back its live program schedule, and resorting exclusively to the occasional broadcast of films. This was primarily because many of the staff had either joined the military service or were redeployed to war-related technical research, and to prolong the life of the early, unstable cameras, which were impossible to repair due to the wartime lack of parts.

In May 1944, as the war began to turn in favor of the Allies, WCBW reopened the studios and the newscasts returned, briefly anchored by Ned Calmer, followed by Alan Jackson, Everett Holles, and Dwight Cooke. After the war, expanded news programs appeared on the WCBW schedule. The station's call letters were changed to WCBS-TV in 1946. Anchors included Bob McKee, Milo Boulton, Jim McMullin, Larry LeSueur, Tom O'Connor, and beginning in 1947, Douglas Edwards.

=== Douglas Edwards (1948–1962) ===
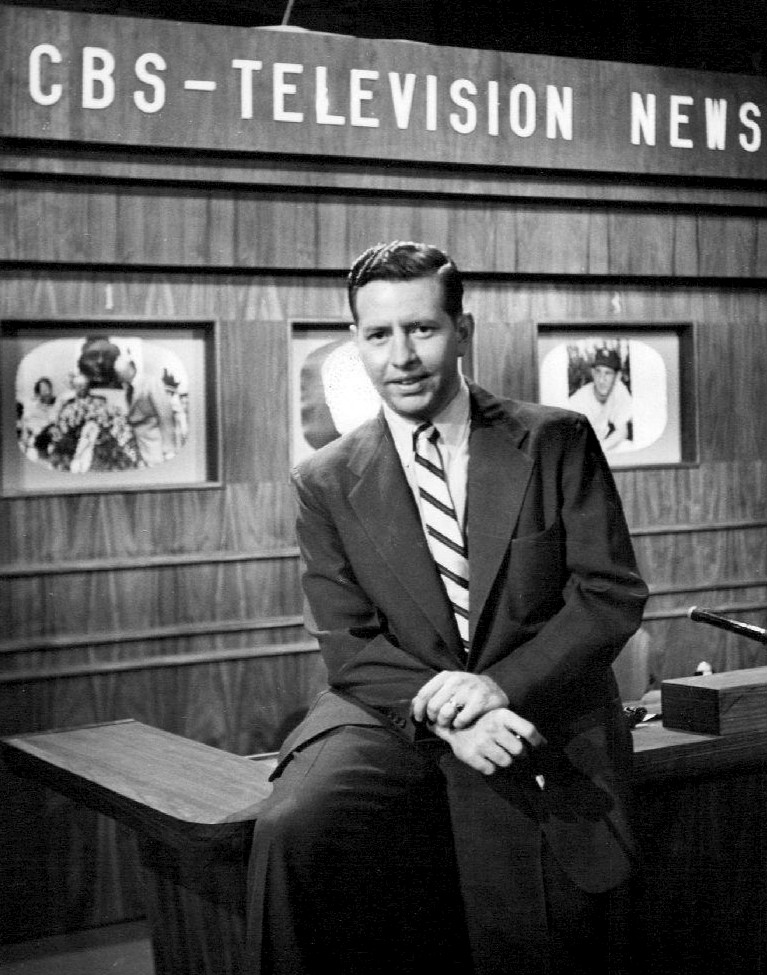
Edwards on set of CBS Television News

On May 3, 1948, Douglas Edwards began anchoring CBS Television News, as a regular 15-minute nightly newscast on the CBS television network, including WCBS-TV. It aired every weeknight at 7:30 pm, and was the first regularly scheduled, network television news program featuring an anchor. (WCBW/WCBS-TV newscasts prior to this time were local television broadcasts seen only in New York City.) NBC's offering at the time, NBC Television Newsreel, which premiered in February 1948, was simply film footage with voice narration.

The network also broadcast a recap of the week's news stories on a Sunday night program titled Newsweek in Review, which was later moved to Saturday and retitled The Week in Review. In 1950, the nightly newscast was renamed Douglas Edwards with the News, and in September the following year, it became the first news program to be broadcast simultaneously on the East Coast and West Coast through the installation of a new coaxial cable connection. That transcontinental link prompted Edwards to start each broadcast with the updated greeting "Good evening everyone, coast to coast."

On November 30, 1956, the program became the first to use the new technology of videotape to time delay the broadcast (which originated in New York City) for the Western United States.

=== Walter Cronkite (1962–1981) ===
On April 16, 1962, veteran CBS journalist Walter Cronkite succeeded Edwards, and the broadcast was retitled Walter Cronkite with the News. On September 2, 1963, the newscast, retitled CBS Evening News, became the very first 30-minute weeknight news broadcast on network television, moving to 6:30 pm Eastern time. (NBC's Huntley-Brinkley Report expanded to 30 minutes exactly one week later, on September 9, 1963.) As before, some affiliates (including flagship owned-and-operated station WCBS-TV in New York City) had the option of carrying a later edition, scheduled at 7:00 pm Eastern.

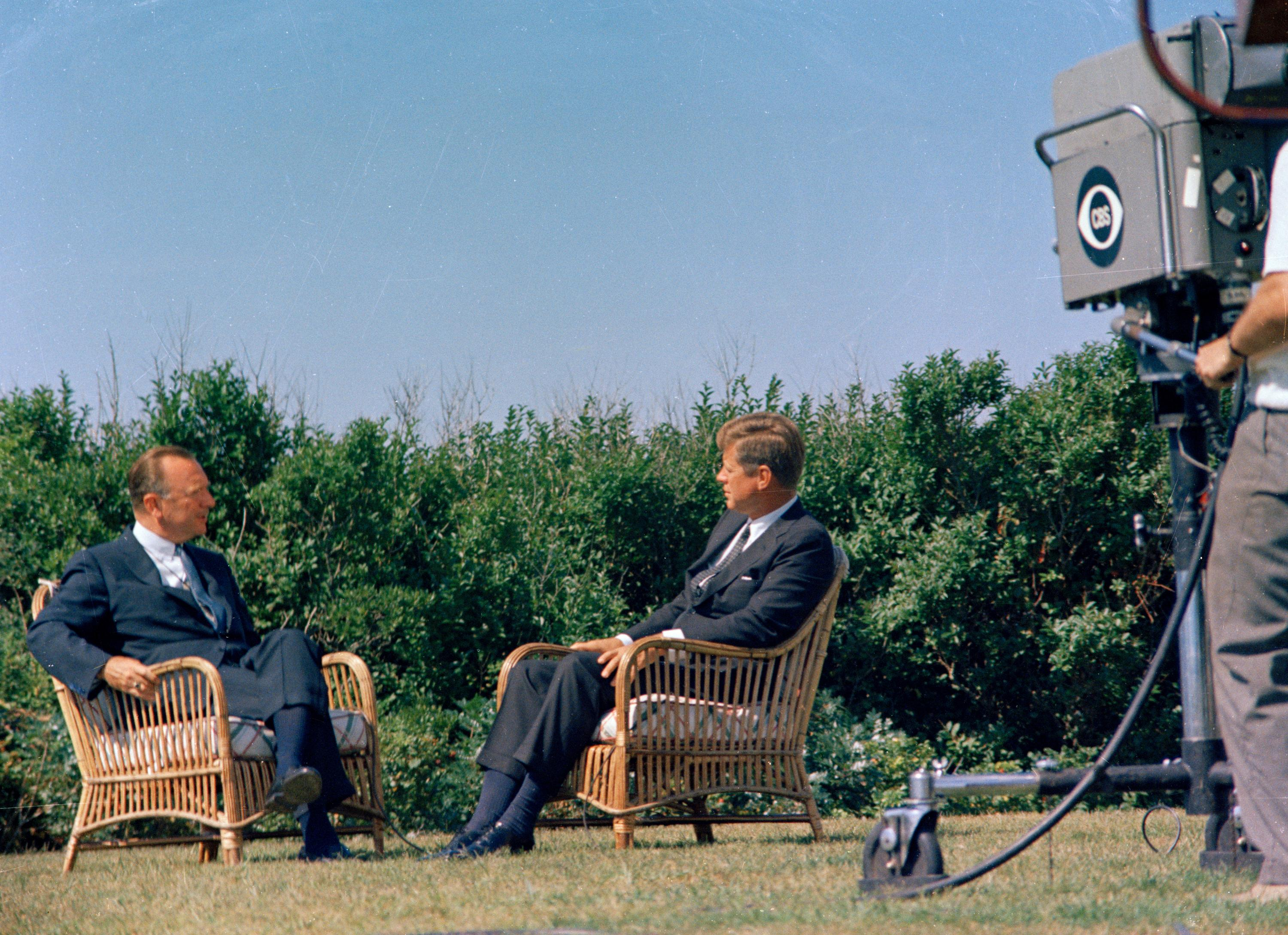
Cronkite interviews President John F. Kennedy to inaugurate the first half-hour nightly news broadcast in 1963

The CBS Evening News was first transmitted in color as a one-evening test broadcast on August 19, 1965, before permanently switching to the format on January 31, 1966. On February 5, 1966, the first Saturday edition of the Evening News debuted, anchored by Roger Mudd.

Under Cronkite, the newscast began what eventually became an 18-year period of dominating the ratings among the network evening news programs. In the process, Cronkite became "the most trusted man in America" according to a Gallup Poll, a status that had first been fostered in November 1963 through his coverage of the assassination of President John F. Kennedy.

In February 1968, Cronkite, who was well-regarded for his work as a war correspondent during World War II, made a special trip to South Vietnam to report on the Tet Offensive, which was then under way. His prime time special report, titled Who, What, When, Where, Why, which was broadcast after he returned, on February 27, 1968, ended with Cronkite declaring that the United States could only hope for a "stalemate" in the Vietnam War. It is often credited with influencing President Lyndon B. Johnson's decision to drop out of the 1968 United States presidential election. "If I've lost Walter Cronkite... [I]'ve lost Middle America," he reportedly stated.

In late 1972, Cronkite prodded the show's producers to feature two nights of in-depth coverage on the unfolding Watergate scandal, which had been reported on extensively by The Washington Post, but had not received major national coverage on television. After the first part of this reportage, shown on a Friday, ran for 14 minutes (roughly half of the air time of the program), Nixon administration officials complained to CBS founder William S. Paley. The second half of the report was aired the following Monday, but only for eight minutes.

=== Dan Rather (1981–2005) ===
==== 1981–1993 ====
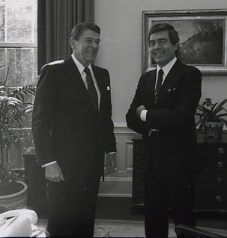
Rather (right) with President Ronald Reagan in 1982

Cronkite was replaced as anchor of the program the Monday after his retirement, March 9, 1981, by 49-year-old Dan Rather, who had been with CBS News as a correspondent since the early 1960s, and later became a correspondent for the network's news magazine, 60 Minutes. Concerns about excessive liberalism in the media were frequently leveled at Rather, the CBS Evening News, CBS News, and CBS in general. Some of these concerns dated from Rather's position as White House correspondent for the network's news division during the Nixon administration. A shouting match with Vice President George H. W. Bush during an interview on live television in January 1988 related to the Iran–Contra affair did little to dispel those concerns. Rather unapologetically defended his behavior in statements the following day, and Bush went on to win the presidential election in November.

Earlier, on September 1, 1986, amid a brewing battle among CBS's board of directors for control of the company and turmoil at CBS News, Rather closed his Monday broadcast with the word "courage", and repeated it the following night. On September 3, Rather said the masculine noun for the Spanish word for "courage", coraje (the primary translation for "courage" in Spanish is valor). In the face of media attention and pleas from his staff, Rather abandoned the signoff on September 8.

On September 11, 1987, Rather marched off camera in anger just before a remote broadcast of the program when it appeared that CBS Sports' coverage of a U.S. Open tennis semifinal match between Steffi Graf and Lori McNeil was going to run over into time allotted for the newscast. Rather was in Miami covering the visit to the city by Pope John Paul II. When the tennis match ended sooner than expected at 6:32 pm Eastern, Rather was nowhere to be found, and six minutes of dead air followed before he returned to the broadcast position; nearly half of the audience watched and waited. Rather attempted to explain his actions with a statement release on Sunday, but made no mention of it on his next newscast on Monday, delayed by the men's final. By 1990, the CBS Evening News had fallen to third place in the ratings, behind ABC's World News Tonight with Peter Jennings and NBC Nightly News with Tom Brokaw.

On January 22, 1991, demonstrators from the AIDS Coalition to Unleash Power (ACT UP) broke into the CBS News studio and chanted "Fight AIDS, not Arabs" during the show's introduction. One protester was seen on camera just as Rather began speaking. Rather immediately called for a commercial break, but the screen went black instead for six seconds before returning to Rather. He apologized twice to viewers about the incident.

==== Connie Chung as co-anchor (1993–1995) ====
On May 31, 1993, CBS News correspondent Connie Chung began co-anchoring the broadcast with Rather. Chung normally co-anchored in the studio with Rather, but sometimes one of them appeared on location, while the other remained in the studio. Though Rather never said so publicly, CBS News insiders said he did not approve of her appointment. Chung's last broadcast as co-anchor was on May 19, 1995.

==== 1995–2005 ====
The newscast returned to a solo anchor format on May 22, 1995, with Dan Rather continuing in his role as anchor. At age 73, Rather retired from the Evening News on March 9, 2005, exactly 24 years after succeeding Cronkite.

Rather left the anchor position amid controversy and a credibility crisis over reports broadcast during the 2004 presidential election campaign. The report was a segment featured on a September 2004 broadcast of 60 Minutes Wednesday, questioning President George W. Bush's Texas Air National Guard record. Conservative activists challenged the authenticity of the documents used for the report. A number of bloggers analyzed scans of the documents, and rapidly concluded they were forgeries. Subsequently, CBS commissioned an independent inquiry into the matter and several CBS staffers were fired or asked to resign.

After departing from the Evening News, Rather remained with CBS News as a correspondent. On June 20, 2006, CBS News President Sean McManus announced that Rather and CBS had agreed to end his 44-year career with the network.

=== Bob Schieffer (2005–2006) ===
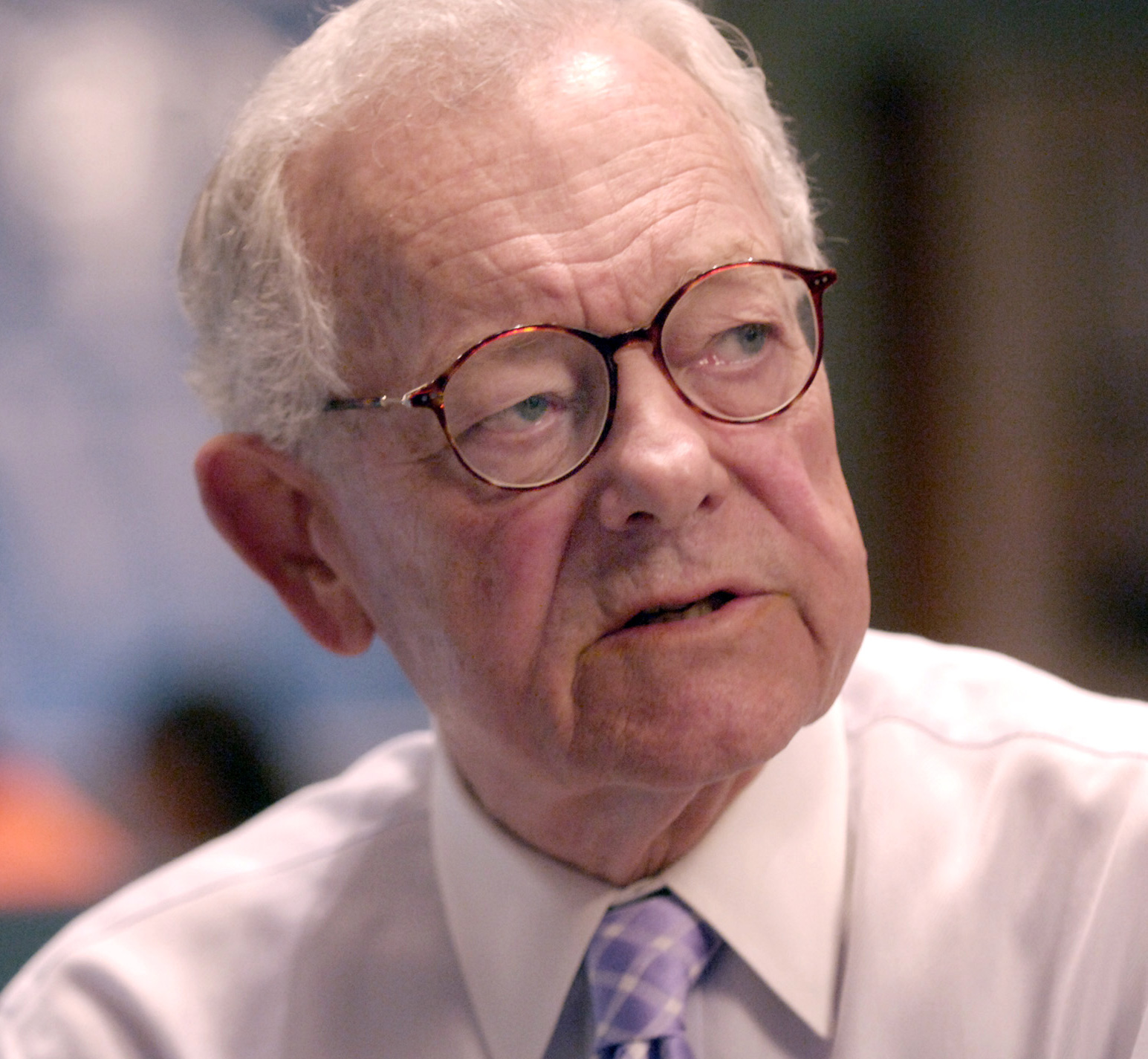
Schieffer in April 2006

On March 10, 2005, Rather was succeeded on an interim basis by Face the Nation host and CBS News correspondent Bob Schieffer. At the time Schieffer took over, how long he would host the broadcast, whether it would retain its current structure, or instead would adopt some kind of multiple host or alternative format was uncertain. Under Rather in the years leading up to his retirement, the CBS Evening News trailed its rivals at ABC and NBC by a fairly large margin. White House correspondent John Roberts, and Scott Pelley, his predecessor in that position, were often mentioned as possible successors to Rather when he retired. Jim Axelrod became White House correspondent when Roberts later left for CNN.

In the months following Rather's departure, the program came to emphasize live exchanges between Schieffer and various CBS News correspondents around the world. In contrast to traditional network news practice, these exchanges were unrehearsed as part of an effort to make the language on the broadcast sound more "natural". Viewership increased over this period, with the program being the only network evening news broadcast to gain viewers during 2005. In November 2005, CBS announced that CBS Evening News executive producer Jim Murphy would be replaced by Rome Hartman, who took over in January 2006.

Schieffer led the CBS Evening News to become the number-two evening news broadcast, ahead of ABC's World News Tonight. The ABC News division was in flux following the death of anchor Peter Jennings in 2005, and with the adoption of a dual-anchor format on World News Tonight, life-threatening injuries suffered by co-anchor Bob Woodruff in January 2006 when an Iraqi military convoy he rode in hit a roadside bomb, leaving Elizabeth Vargas as sole anchor. When Charles Gibson was appointed sole anchor of World News Tonight in May 2006, after Elizabeth Vargas resigned in connection with her pregnancy, ABC regained stability and momentum to regain the second spot.

Bob Schieffer's final CBS Evening News program was broadcast on August 31, 2006. Russ Mitchell filled in for the following nights (September 1, September 4, 2006), after which he was succeeded by Katie Couric on September 5, 2006.

=== Katie Couric (2006–2011) ===
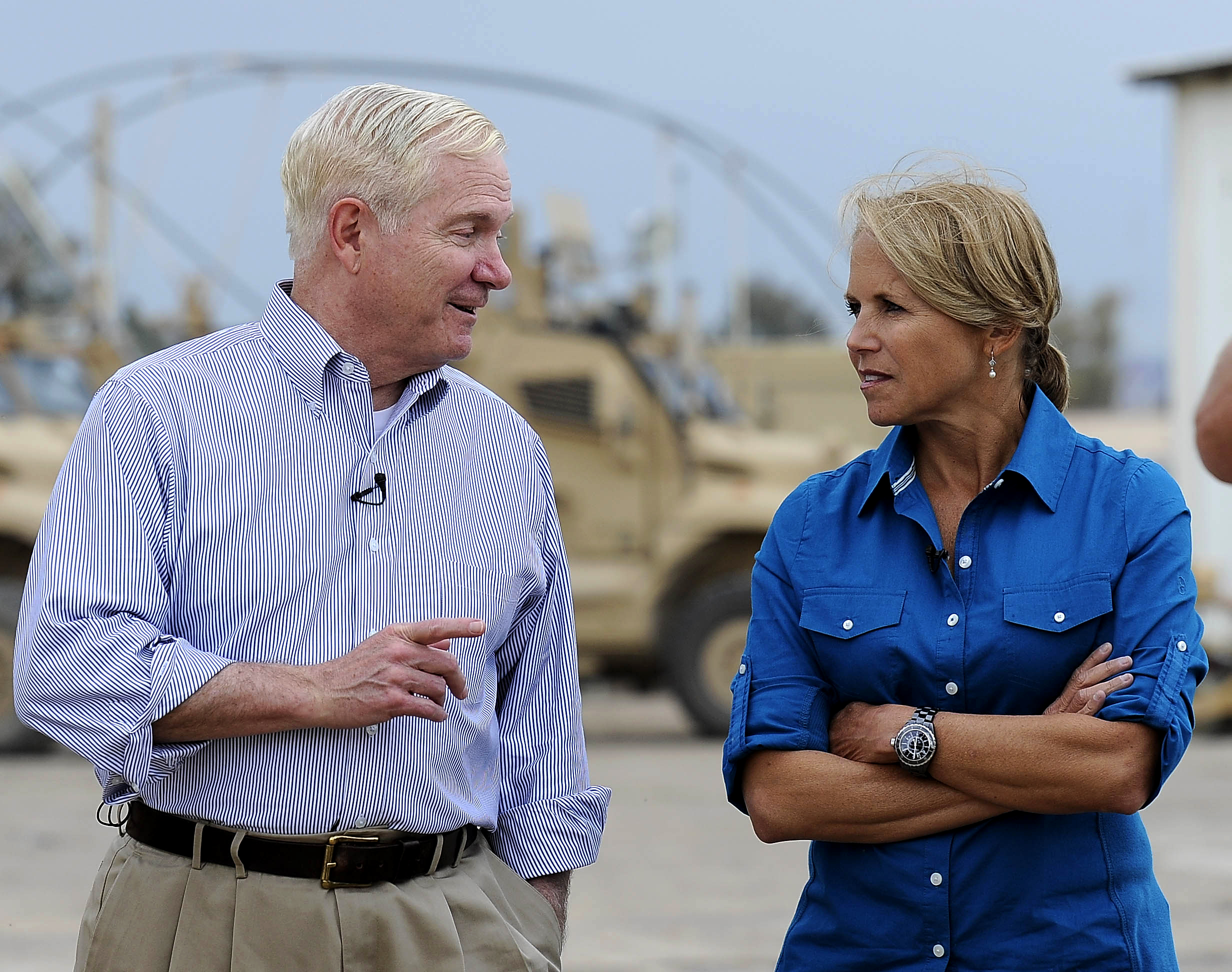
Couric with U.S. Defense Secretary Robert Gates in Mosul, Iraq, April 8, 2011

On December 1, 2005, Katie Couric, co-anchor of NBC's Today, reportedly was considering an offer by CBS to anchor the Evening News. Couric officially signed a contract to become anchor of the CBS Evening News on April 1, 2006, and formally announced four days later on Today that she would be leaving the show and NBC News after a 15-year run as the morning show's co-anchor. Ratings during Couric's period as anchor fluctuated, seemingly improving at times, but also posting historic lows rivaling those dating back to at least the 1991–92 season.

Couric began working at CBS News in July 2006. During her first broadcast as anchor on September 5, 2006, a new graphics package and set, and a new theme composed by Academy Award-winning composer James Horner were introduced. Similar graphics and music were introduced on other CBS News programs such as Up to the Minute, CBS Morning News, and The Early Show throughout October. A new opening title sequence was designed, with Walter Cronkite providing the voiceover, replacing Wendell Craig unless a temporary voice-over was needed. Following Cronkite's death months earlier, actor Morgan Freeman recorded a new voice-over for the title sequence, which debuted on January 4, 2010. The program also debuted a new feature called "freeSpeech" in which different Americans, ranging from well-known national figures to average people, would provide news commentary. After overwhelmingly negative reaction, the segment was discontinued.

On March 8, 2007, The New York Times reported that the program's executive producer Rome Hartman was being replaced by television news veteran Rick Kaplan. Hartman left as executive producer on March 7. Kaplan came to the Evening News after stints at MSNBC, CNN, and ABC's World News Tonight with Peter Jennings.

On April 4, 2007, Couric read a one-minute commentary about the importance of reading, in a piece substantially lifted from a Wall Street Journal column by Jeffrey Zaslow. Couric appeared to personally reminisce about her first library card — "I still remember when I got my first library card, browsing through the stacks for my favorite books" — but the words were all Zaslow's. It was later determined that a producer had actually plagiarized the piece, and the video was subsequently removed from the CBS News website. Zaslow responded that CBS had "been very gracious and apologetic, and we at the Journal appreciate it." Furthermore, this was a notable case of "double plagiarism"; the producer claimed the text from Zaslow, and the anchor claimed the words from the producer. That producer, Melissa McNamara, was fired hours after the Journal contacted CBS News to complain. The network promised changes to its procedures.

On July 28, 2008, the CBS Evening News became the third network evening newscast to begin broadcasting in high definition (behind NBC Nightly News and PBS's The NewsHour with Jim Lehrer).

On August 27, 2008, Mediabistro wrote a piece about the Big Three network newscasts, praising Couric's Evening News for extensive reporting that had, in its opinion, content better than its rivals. Another critic from MarketWatch praised Couric's work, and said that people should watch out for her in 2009. Washington Post writer Tom Shales praised Couric as a warmer, more benevolent presence than her two competitors, something that she brought to the program nearly 16 years of goodwill from doing Today and becoming America's sweetheart, or else very close to it, and he claimed that this goodwill remained. Shales added that viewers "may find bad news less discomforting and sleep-depriving if Couric gives it to them". He also added that she does not try to "sugarcoat" or "prettify" grim realities. According to Shales, the Evening News may be a more hospitable, welcoming sort of place than its competitors. He concluded by stating, "it's naive to think that viewers choose their news anchor based solely on strict journalistic credentials, though Couric's do seem to be in order, despite her critics' claims."

The CBS Evening News with Katie Couric won the 2008 and 2009 Edward R. Murrow Award for best newscast. In September 2008, Couric interviewed Republican vice presidential nominee Sarah Palin, earning respect from a MarketWatch critic for asking tough questions. In 2011, the program was the recipient of both an Emmy for Outstanding Continuing Coverage and the Edward R. Murrow Award for Video News Series for foreign correspondent Terry McCarthy's feature story "Afghan Bomb Squad."

On May 18, 2009, the newscast's graphics were overhauled, using a blue and red color scheme with web-influenced motifs and layouts. The new graphics design featured a look influenced by the graphics that CBS used during the 2008 presidential election coverage.

On April 3, 2011, the Associated Press reported that Couric would be leaving the Evening News when her contract expired in June. Couric later confirmed her departure to People, citing a desire for "a format that will allow (her) to engage in more multidimensional storytelling." On May 13, 2011, Couric announced that the following Thursday, May 19, 2011, would be her last broadcast.

Despite originally retooling the newscasts to add more features, interviews, and human-interest stories, over time, it returned to the hard-news format popularized by Cronkite. Harry Smith served as an interim anchor until Pelley's tenure started on June 6, 2011 (like Couric before him, Smith would also depart from CBS a month later).

=== Scott Pelley (2011–2017) ===
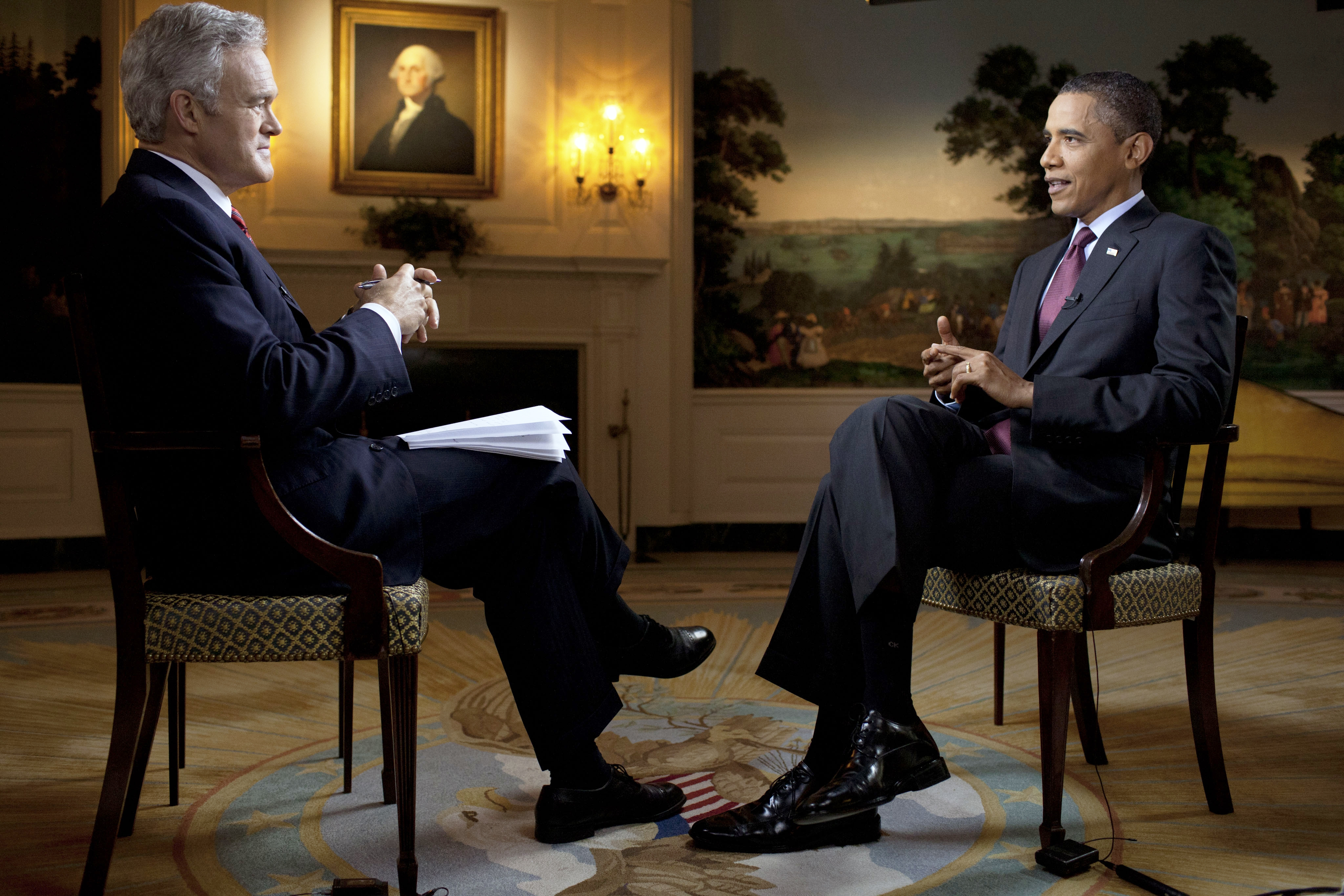
Pelley interviews President Barack Obama in the Diplomatic Receiving Room of the White House in 2011.

In an April 2011 article, the New York Times reported that 60 Minutes correspondent Scott Pelley was considered to be the front-runner to replace Couric as anchor of the program.

On May 3, 2011, CBS confirmed that Pelley would replace Couric as anchor for the CBS Evening News in June. The graphics were subtly updated (the Couric 2009-2011 graphics were used for the first four years of Pelley's tenure as anchor from 2011 to 2015), the American flag background on the news set (which had been used since the 2008 elections, this was last used on Harry Smith interim anchor episodes until 2011) was replaced by a replica of the globe fixture during the Cronkite era, and the James Horner theme was replaced by the 1987–91 theme composed by Trivers-Myers Music that was used during the early part of the Dan Rather era (the theme was last used on Up to the Minute on June 24, 2011, and was replaced by the Rather and Pelley theme the same year).

By March 2012, within his first nine months in the anchor chair, Pelley gained an additional 821,000 viewers. In 2013, at the end of the second season, Pelley added nearly 500,000 viewers from a year ago. On May 29, 2015, The Wrap wrote: "These days, CBS brass may finally have a reason to smile. On Wednesday, the network announced 'Evening News with Scott Pelley' added more than 1.25 million viewers over the past four years – a whopping 21% jump. The show also saw audience growth for the fifth consecutive season, the first time any network evening news broadcast has done that since 1987."

At the end of the 2015–2016 television season, CBS News announced, "The CBS Evening News with Scott Pelley, America's fastest-growing network evening news broadcast, finished the 2015–16 television season with CBS's highest ratings in the time period in 10 years (since the 2005–06 season), according to Nielsen most current ratings. The CBS Evening News has grown its audience for six consecutive seasons, a first-time achievement for any network evening news broadcast since the advent of people meters (since at least 1987). Under Pelley, who assumed the anchor chair in June 2011, the CBS Evening News added 1.4 million viewers and an audience increase of 23%, double NBC and ABC's growth combined over the same period (since the 2010–11 season).

Pelley refocused the program towards hard news and away from the soft news and infotainment features of the early Katie Couric era. Story selection focused more on foreign policy, Washington politics, and economic subjects. The program's audience viewership began to grow immediately, closing the gap between the CBS Evening News and its competitors by one million viewers within a year, although the CBS program remains in third place among the network evening newscasts. In late May 2016, a new theme tune composed by Joel Beckerman of Man Made Music was introduced. Later that same year in December, the program moved permanently into CBS Studio 57, which the newscast used during their 2016 election coverage (moving from its longtime home of studio 47) at the CBS Broadcast Center, and gained a new set to go with it.

On May 30, 2017, reports surfaced confirming that Scott Pelley had been relieved of his duties at CBS Evening News. Pelley remained at CBS News as a 60 Minutes correspondent. Pelley reportedly asked staff members to clear out his office. The move was made official on May 31, 2017, and Anthony Mason was named interim anchor. On June 6, 2017, CBS Evening News announced that Pelley would anchor until June 16, 2017.

=== Jeff Glor (2017–2019) ===
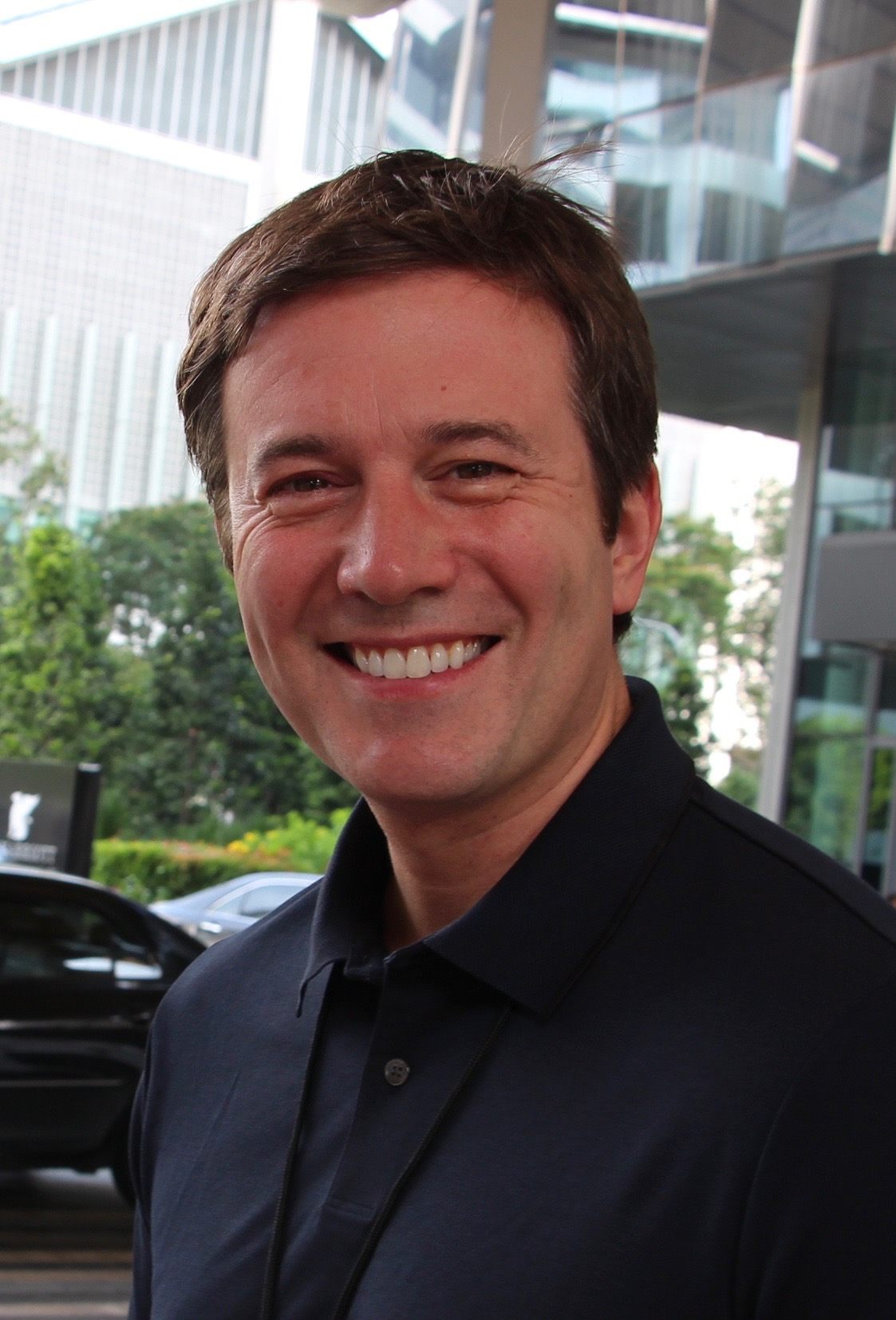
Glor in Singapore in 2018

On October 25, 2017, CBS News announced that correspondent Jeff Glor would be the new CBS Evening News anchor. On November 26, 2017, the organization announced his first official air date for December 4, 2017. Together with Glor's debut, the newscast also updated its looks and used a new logotype and updated typography, using Ridley Grotesk as its base. However, the theme music and set from the later Pelley era were retained.

On May 6, 2019, it was announced that Glor would leave CBS Evening News. The last day of his tenure was May 10, 2019. John Dickerson, Major Garrett, Margaret Brennan, Anthony Mason, David Begnaud, Bob Schieffer, Bill Whitaker, James Brown, Jane Pauley, Jim Axelrod, Maurice DuBois, and Tony Dokoupil anchored on an interim basis until Norah O'Donnell took the anchor chair on July 15, 2019.

=== Norah O'Donnell (2019–2025) ===
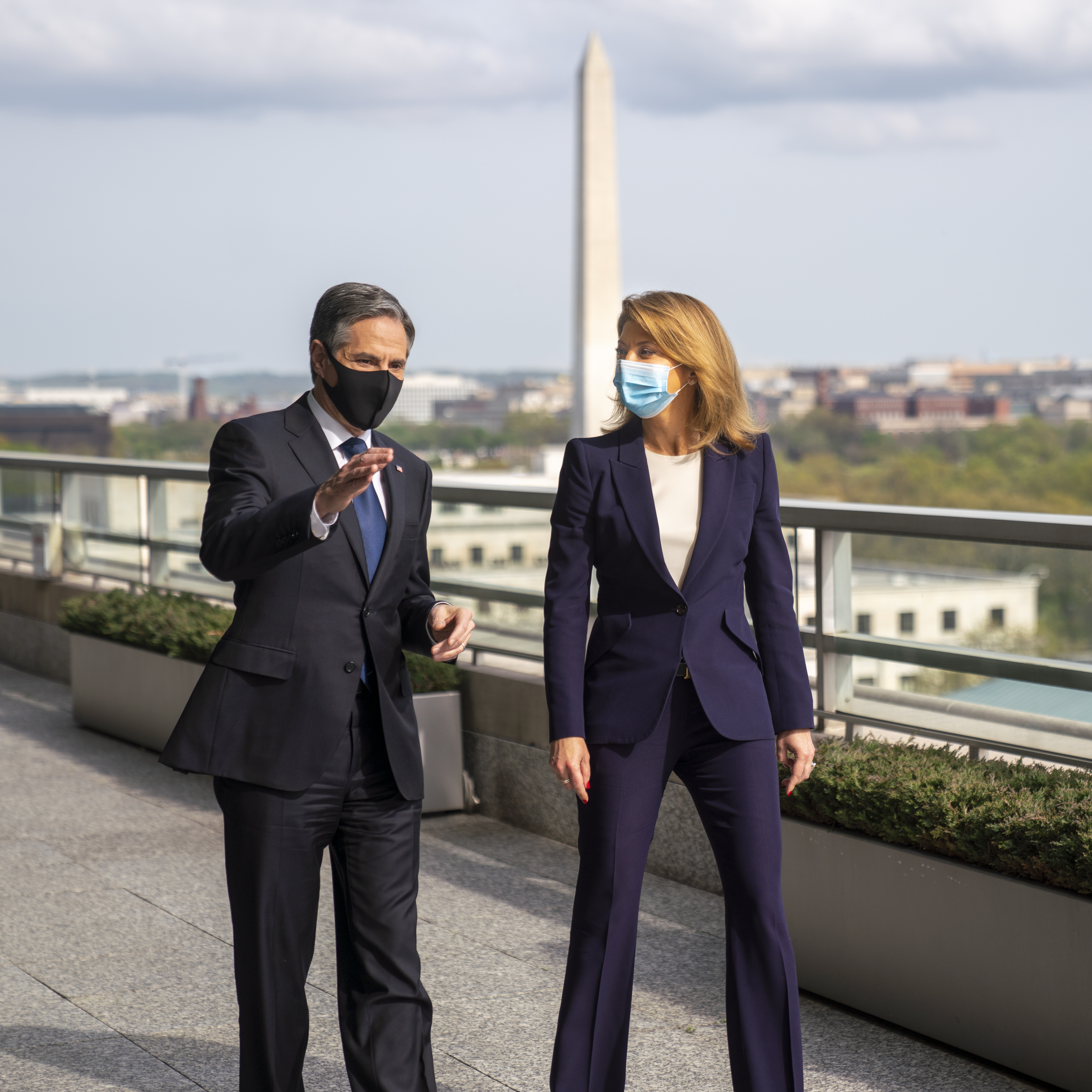
O'Donnell speaks to US Secretary of State Antony Blinken at the US State Department in April 2021.

On May 6, 2019, CBS News announced that Norah O'Donnell was named anchor and managing editor of CBS Evening News to replace Glor, effective July 15, 2019. CBS also announced that the show would be moving to Washington, DC, on December 2, 2019. This marked the first time that a major network evening news program was based outside of New York City since 1978, when ABC World News Tonight used bureaus in Washington, DC, Chicago, and London for its broadcasts. O'Donnell's approach has been described by her as "hard news with heart", combining investigative reporting and original storytelling, which connects with people and is solutions-oriented.

On April 8, 2022, O'Donnell reportedly had renewed her contract through at least the 2024 presidential election. A rebranding of the program was unveiled on August 29, 2022, featuring a world map motif (a design that has frequently been used in CBS News programming as an homage to Walter Cronkite's era) and elements of the CBS brand identity first introduced in 2020. As part of the rebrand, the show introduced a new theme composed by Antfood's Wilson Brown and Dalton Harts, which is an arrangement of the 1987−91 Trivers-Myers theme used during Dan Rather and Scott Pelley's tenures as anchor during their respective eras (1987 and 2011) that incorporates Antfood's sonic branding for the network.

=== John Dickerson and Maurice DuBois (2025) ===
On July 30, 2024, O'Donnell announced that she would step down as anchor of the CBS Evening News after the 2024 elections. She remains with CBS News as a senior correspondent. On August 1, CBS News announced that the Evening News would undergo a retool and introduce a multianchor format with an emphasis on its "ensemble of journalists"; John Dickerson and Maurice DuBois would serve as co-anchors, while Margaret Brennan of Face the Nation and WCBS-TV weather reporter Lonnie Quinn would serve as regular contributors for politics and weather-related topics. 60 Minutes executive producer Bill Owens was named supervising producer, and fellow 60 Minutes producer Guy Campanile was named executive producer. O'Donnell anchored her final edition of the CBS Evening News on January 23, 2025, with Dickerson and DuBois debuting on January 27, 2025.

The retooled Evening News carried a news magazine-like format with a focus on long-form stories, rather than the headline-focused formats of its main competitors (brief summaries of other headlines are relegated to a short "RoundUp" segment at the end of the opening block). CBS News and Stations CEO Wendy McMahon explained that the program would share the "values" of 60 Minutes and make use of its correspondents, aiming for it to be "[where] they have big news to break". Dickerson explained that "people have the news all day in their pockets, and we're not trying to compete with that. What we can share is the perspective that comes from the deep reporting that our correspondents do." DuBois emphasized the increased emphasis on correspondents in the new format, explaining that they would "feel like people you know describing incredible things that they just witnessed."

Production returned to studio 47 at the CBS Broadcast Center in New York City, with a new studio using a three-sided LED video wall that displayed both graphics and digital scenery. The theme music adopted in 2022 was also dropped, with the original version of the Trivers-Myers theme reinstated a second time. Alongside the new Evening News, CBS also announced that it would introduce a half-hour extension—CBS Evening News Plus—anchored by Dickerson, which premiered two weeks later on February 10, 2025. Similarly to CBS Mornings Plus (a similar extension of CBS Mornings that premiered in September 2024), the program streamed on CBS News 24/7, and aired on selected CBS owned-and-operated stations (predominantly on the West Coast) alongside the main program.

By February 12, 2025, the new format began to see changes, including some broadcasts featuring a more traditional "tease" in the introduction, or leading with conventional, headline-based packages in the opening block rather than immediately beginning with a long-form story. On April 22, 2025, Owens resigned from CBS News; amid ongoing legal action from President Donald Trump over a story broadcast on 60 Minutes during the lead-up to the 2024 presidential election, Owens believed he could no longer "make independent decisions based on what was right for 60 Minutes."

In October 2025, amid changes to CBS News under new parent company Paramount Skydance, Dickerson announced that he would depart the division at the end of the year. In addition, as part of staff cuts by Paramount Skydance and the installation of Bari Weiss as editor-in-chief of CBS News. CBS Evening News Plus was also cancelled.

=== Tony Dokoupil (2026–present) ===
On December 4, 2025, DuBois announced that he too would depart from CBS News. On December 10, 2025, it was subsequently announced that CBS Mornings co-host Tony Dokoupil would take over as the new anchor of the CBS Evening News. Dickerson and DuBois hosted their final edition on December 18, 2025, while Dokoupil's tenure was to begin on January 5, 2026, with a two-week "Live from America" tour of broadcasts from Miami, Atlanta, Dallas, Denver, San Francisco, Detroit, Minneapolis, Chicago, Cincinnati, and Pittsburgh.

Amid the editorial changes being undertaken by Bari Weiss, Dokoupil released a promo promising that the CBS Evening News planned to remain objective and editorially independent from politicians, advertisers, and corporate interests (including those of CBS itself). He argued that news media coverage at CBS on topics such as the Iraq War, COVID-19 pandemic, Hillary Clinton's emails, and Hunter Biden's laptop was "skewed" in favor of "political and academic elites and away from the concerns of normal people". CBS reported its 38-page handbook of principles was reduced to "5 simple values", of which one was "we love America". Variety reported the pro-America pledge "reinforce[d] speculation that Ellison put Weiss in charge of CBS News in an effort to boost its appeal among MAGA supporters generally — and with President Trump specifically".

Following the United States strikes in Venezuela, Dokoupil soft launched his tenure on January 3 with a special edition from the KPIX studios in San Francisco, before returning to the CBS Broadcast Center in New York for his debut broadcast on January 5, and then commencing the "Live from America" on January 6 from Miami. With Dokoupil's formal debut, the CBS Evening News largely reverted to its previous format. A new closing segment known as "Only in America" was introduced, which features a lighthearted story profiling an American.

The visual overhaul implemented for the Dickerson–DuBois tenure was reverted in favor of a design closer-resembling other CBS News programs. Its logo and some graphics feature the Didot typeface, which had historically been used by CBS since the 1950s. Initially, Studio 47 was configured with a new anchor desk using the newsroom as a backdrop, rather than the LED "volume". By mid-March 2026, the broadcast had returned to using the video walls, mirroring how they were used during the Dickerson–DuBois production. The Trivers-Myers theme was also replaced by the 1991 Rick Patterson-composed theme music used during the later portion of Dan Rather's tenure. On October 5, 2026, a new opening theme was introduced, presumably composed by Antfood, only for the original Patterson theme to be reinstated a week later on October 12.

Dokoupil's first week on-air was seen by an average of 4.17 million nightly viewers, a 23% decline in comparison to the same week in 2025 (which fell during Norah O'Donnell's final weeks as anchor).

== Weekend editions ==
The CBS Evening News expanded to weekend evenings on February 5, 1966. Sunday editions of the program were dropped in September 1971, when CBS began airing 60 Minutes at 6:00 pm Eastern time slot to help affiliates fulfill requirements imposed by the Federal Communications Commission's Prime Time Access Rule. The Sunday edition returned in January 1976, when the network moved 60 Minutes one hour later to 7:00 pm Eastern Time. The weekend editions of the CBS Evening News were periodically abbreviated or pre-empted outright due to CBS Sports programming. On May 2, 2016, CBS announced that the weekend editions of the CBS Evening News, effective May 7, would be revamped as the CBS Weekend News. The new program would rely on resources from CBS's streaming news channel CBSN (now CBS News 24/7), as well as reports from local affiliates, and highlights from the past week.

== Western edition ==
CBS introduced a Western edition of the program in 1979, which was anchored by Terry Drinkwater with staff based in its Los Angeles bureau being placed on standby for updates to the main CBS Evening News broadcast each weeknight; this lasted until September 1985, when CBS News instituted layoffs at the Los Angeles bureau following a successful fending off of a takeover attempt of the network by Ted Turner. The program eventually resumed production of the Western edition from its New York City and Washington studios (which may also be produced from remote locations where the program is broadcast when warranted). The host previously announced, "good evening to our viewers in the West" and packages had been updated to reflect late breaking news.

== Anchors ==
- Richard Hubbell (1941–1942)
- Ned Calmer (1944)
- Everett Holles (1944–1945)
- Allan Jackson (1944–1945)
- Dwight Cooke (1945–1946)
- Tom O'Connor (1945–1946)
- Bob McKee (1946)
- Milo Boulton (1946)
- Jim McMullin (1946–1947)
- Larry LeSueur (1947)
- Douglas Edwards (1947–1962)
- Walter Cronkite (1962–1981)
- Terry Drinkwater (Western Edition co-anchor; 1979–1985)
- Dan Rather (1981–2005)
- Connie Chung (co-anchor; 1993–1995)
- Bob Schieffer (2005–2006)
- Katie Couric (2006–2011)
- Scott Pelley (2011–2017)
- Jeff Glor (2017–2019)
- Norah O'Donnell (2019–2025)
- John Dickerson (January-December 2025)
- Maurice DuBois (January-December 2025)
- Tony Dokoupil (2026–present)

== Audio format ==
Former CBS Radio owned news stations had aired an audio simulcast of the CBS Evening News airs weekdays. KYW is the last of these stations to do so. Only the first 13-15 minutes of the broadcast are aired, before resuming regular programming.

WCLO airs an audio simulcast of the entire CBS Evening News from Madison-based WISC-TV.

In addition to a radio broadcast, the CBS Evening News is also available as a podcast.

== International broadcasts ==
From March 17, 1987, until the early 2000s, the program was shown daily (from Tuesday to Saturday) with French subtitles on French network Canal+ at 07:00 every morning.

The program was broadcast on the American Network in Mexico, Guatemala, and El Salvador.

In Japan, the CBS Evening News was shown on BS-TBS as part of that network's morning news program.

The Evening News was broadcast live on ATV World in Hong Kong daily until January 1, 2009.

Belize's Tropical Vision Limited occasionally airs the program as a substitute for its airing of the NBC Nightly News on Saturdays and occasionally during the week.
