= Rick Kaplan =

American network television producer

- Born: Richard N. Kaplan; April 18, 1948 (age 78); Chicago, Illinois
- Education: B.A., University of Illinois
- Occupation: Television producer
- Television: ABC News, MSNBC, CNN,Fox Television

Richard N. Kaplan is an American television producer and author. He has worked with CBS, ABC, CNN/U.S., Fox Television, and MSNBC. Kaplan has served as an executive producer for programs featuring Walter Cronkite, Peter Jennings, Ted Koppel, Diane Sawyer, Katie Couric, and Christiane Amanpour.

Kaplan began his broadcast journalism career at CBS WBBM-TV in Chicago. He worked for CBS until 1979. He then moved to ABC, where he served until 1997. He then served as the president of CNN/U.S. until 2000. He became senior vice president of ABC News in 2003 and was named president of MSNBC in February 2004. In June 2006, Kaplan resigned as president of MSNBC. The following year, he replaced Rome Hartman as executive producer of the CBS Evening News with Katie Couric. In 2011, he was named executive producer of This Week with Christiane Amanpour and was put in charge of ABC News’s political coverage, including the 2012 election coverage and specials. In August 2012, Kaplan founded Kaplan Media Partners. He has received 30 Emmy Awards.

== Early life and education ==
Richard Kaplan was born in Chicago, Illinois. He graduated from the University of Illinois in 1971, where he was a member of the Alpha Epsilon Pi fraternity.

== Career ==
Kaplan's broadcast journalism career began at CBS News, where he was an associate producer for the CBS Evening News with Walter Cronkite from 1974 to 1979 and an associate producer for the CBS Morning News from 1971 to 1974. He was a writer, assignment desk editor, and producer at WBBM-TV, the CBS-owned station in Chicago, from 1969 to 1971.

Kaplan joined ABC News in 1979 as a senior producer for World News Tonight with Peter Jennings. From 1979 to 1997, Kaplan held a variety of positions at ABC News and the ABC Television Network.

Before joining Nightline, Kaplan was the executive producer of World News This Morning and Good Morning America news programs.

After serving as executive producer of ABC's Nightline during the 1980s, Kaplan served as the executive producer of ABC's Primetime Live from 1989 to 1994.

In January 1994, Kaplan became executive producer of World News Tonight with Peter Jennings and was responsible for the program's direction and overall editorial content.

As the President of CNN-US, Kaplan was responsible for news and programming at the flagship network of the CNN News Group.

Kaplan reportedly clashed with CNN anchor Lou Dobbs.

On April 20, 1999, CNN was covering President Clinton's speech in Littleton, Colorado, following the Columbine High School massacre. Dobbs ordered the producer to cut away from the speech and return to broadcast Moneyline. Dobbs' order was countermanded by Kaplan, who ordered CNN to return to the speech. Kaplan later stated, "Tell me what journalistic reason there was not to cover the president at Columbine soon after the shootings? Everyone else was doing it." Dobbs announced on the air that "CNN President Rick Kaplan wants us to return to Littleton." A few days later, Dobbs announced his departure from the network to start a website devoted to astronautical news. In June 2003, Kaplan was appointed senior vice president of ABC News. He became president of MSNBC in February 2004. Kaplan stepped down from the position in June 2006, amid declining ratings and network restructuring efforts. In March 2007, he was named executive producer of the CBS Evening News with Katie Couric. In May 2011, Kaplan was named executive producer of ABC News' This Week With Christiane Amanpour and placed in charge of political coverage, including the 2012 election coverage and specials.

Kaplan founded Kaplan Media Partners in August 2012. Kaplan Media Partners' first client was Aaron Sorkin and the HBO program The Newsroom, where Kaplan served as a creative consultant beginning with the second season. Writing for the second season began in September 2012.

Kaplan has taught journalism classes every semester since 1993 at the University of Illinois College of Communications in Urbana–Champaign. In 1999, Kaplan received an honorary Doctor of Letters from the University of Illinois, his alma mater. He has also taught and lectured at universities across the country, including Duke University, Columbia University, Cornell, Wellesley, Boston College, Columbia College, USC Berkeley, and the University of Pennsylvania.
