= Terry Drinkwater =

American television and radio journalist

- Born: May 9, 1936; Denver, Colorado, U.S.
- Died: May 31, 1989 (aged 53); Malibu, California, U.S.
- Education: Pomona College (1958), UC Berkeley (Master of Arts, 1959)
- Occupations: Radio and television news reporter and correspondent
- Employer: CBS News (1963–1988)
- Awards: Three Emmy Awards, Alfred I. duPont–Columbia University Award

Terry Drinkwater (May 9, 1936 – May 31, 1989) was an American television and radio journalist most widely known for his quarter-century career as a correspondent for CBS News. Drinkwater was also an anchorman for the West Coast editions of the CBS Evening News, covering events that occurred after the East Coast version with Walter Cronkite aired.

== Education ==
A native of Denver, Colorado, Drinkwater attended Pomona College, where he co-founded KSPC radio and earned a bachelor's degree in 1958. The following year he received a Master of Arts at the University of California at Berkeley.

== Radio career ==
Drinkwater's first major break in broadcasting came when he was hired in 1959 as general manager of Pacifica Radio KPFK-FM, a public station in Los Angeles. Under his leadership KPFK won a Peabody Institutional Award the following year, in recognition of the station's programming.

== Television career ==
Drinkwater joined CBS News in 1963, after working as a reporter at television station KTLA in Los Angeles. At CBS, his main assignment was as a regional correspondent, "roaming the West from the Rocky Mountains to Alaska." Drinkwater and fellow CBS News correspondent, Roger Mudd, were on scene in the Embassy Ballroom of the Ambassador Hotel in downtown Los Angeles in the early morning hours of June 5, 1968 when United States Senator Robert F. Kennedy was shot. Kennedy died the following day at Good Samaritan Hospital. He covered such notable events as the 1974 kidnapping of Patricia "Patty" Hearst and the 1980 eruption of Mount St. Helens.

Drinkwater received three Emmy Awards and an Alfred I. duPont–Columbia University Award. He once received a 90-day suspension from CBS for representing a wine-company employee as a satisfied customer.

== Death ==
Drinkwater filed his last report for CBS News in August 1988. He died at his home in Malibu, California at the age of 53 after a six-year battle with cancer. At the time of his death, he was senior correspondent in the Los Angeles Bureau of CBS News.
