= Margaret Brennan =

American journalist (born 1980)

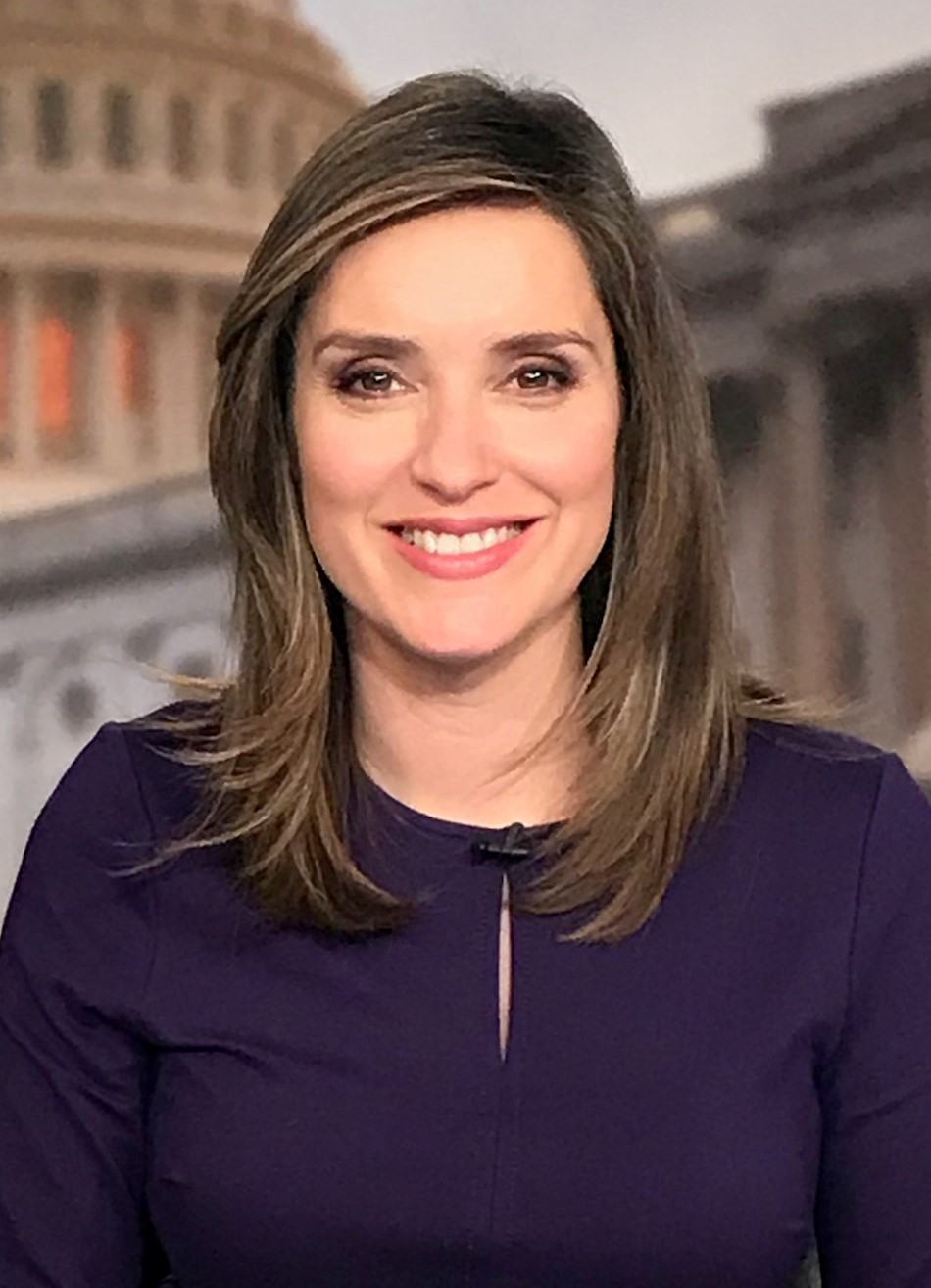
- Brennan on set of Face the Nation in 2018
- Born: Margaret Mary Brennan; March 26, 1980 (age 46); Stamford, Connecticut, U.S.
- Education: University of Virginia (BA)
- Notable credits: Face the Nation with Margaret Brennan moderator (2018–present); CBS News correspondent (2012–present)
- Spouse: Yado Yakub (m. 2015)
- Children: 2
- Website: facethenation.com

Margaret Mary Brennan (born March 26, 1980) is an American journalist and moderator of Face the Nation on CBS News, the network's chief foreign affairs correspondent and a fill-in and substitute anchor for CBS Evening News. Brennan was previously a White House correspondent for CBS and has covered Washington since 2012.

Before CBS, Brennan anchored the weekday show InBusiness with Margaret Brennan on Bloomberg Television. She was also a CNBC correspondent contributing to various NBC News programs.

Brennan is a board member of the Council on Foreign Relations and a member of the Gridiron Club. She serves on the alumni advisory board at the University of Virginia, and the advisory board of the Smurfit School of Business at University College Dublin.

== Early life ==
Brennan was born on March 26, 1980, in Stamford, Connecticut, to Edward Brennan and Jane Brennan. She is of Irish descent.

In 1998, Brennan graduated with honors from the Convent of the Sacred Heart in Greenwich, Connecticut. She attended the University of Virginia, graduating with highest distinction in 2002 with a Bachelor of Arts degree in foreign affairs and Middle Eastern studies and a minor in Arabic. She was named an Emmerich-Wright scholar for her thesis and also studied abroad at Yarmouk University in Irbid, Jordan, on a Fulbright-Hays Grant.

In 2015, she received an honorary Doctor of Humane Letters degree from Niagara University for her work in international affairs.

== Career ==
=== CNBC ===
Brennan began her business news career in 2002 at CNBC as a producer for prominent financial journalist Louis Rukeyser. She wrote, did research, and booked guests for the weekly Louis Rukeyser's Wall Street program and prime-time specials.

Brennan later worked as a producer on Street Signs with Ron Insana, for which she coordinated guest bookings and produced interviews with former president George W. Bush and former secretary of state Colin Powell.

As a CNBC correspondent, she covered the 2008 financial crisis with a focus on consumer issues.

She conducted interviews with former Walmart CEO Lee Scott and Irish Prime Minister Brian Cowen. She broke the story of Circuit City's liquidation in 2009 and regularly covered changing consumer trends for the network.

=== Bloomberg Television ===
On June 24, 2009, Margaret Brennan left CNBC to join Bloomberg Television:

"I think across the board, you can't separate the business stories from the international political stories any longer. Covering the global consumer, covering the global markets—all that is going to be a part of the canvas here."

— Margaret Brennan, Observer

At Bloomberg, she anchored InBusiness with Margaret Brennan, a weekday program broadcast live from the New York Stock Exchange that covered the top political, economic, and global financial news impacting the marketplace. During her tenure, she broadcast live from Riyadh, Dubai, Cairo, London, Dublin, Abu Dhabi, and Davos. Brennan covered top breaking news stories involving the European debt crisis, the largest insider trading case in U.S. history, and the BP oil spill. She anchored live from Tahrir Square as Hosni Mubarak stepped down after 30 years in power.

Additionally, Brennan has interviewed the International Monetary Fund's Christine Lagarde, investor George Soros, and former British Prime Minister Tony Blair as well as Ireland's Prime Minister and Dubai's ruler during their respective debt crises.

She also helped to anchor coverage of Bloomberg's 2012 Republican presidential candidate debates.

Brennan left Bloomberg in 2012; on April 27, 2012, she hosted her last show of InBusiness. There was no reason for her departure other than the chance to pursue new opportunities.

=== CBS News ===
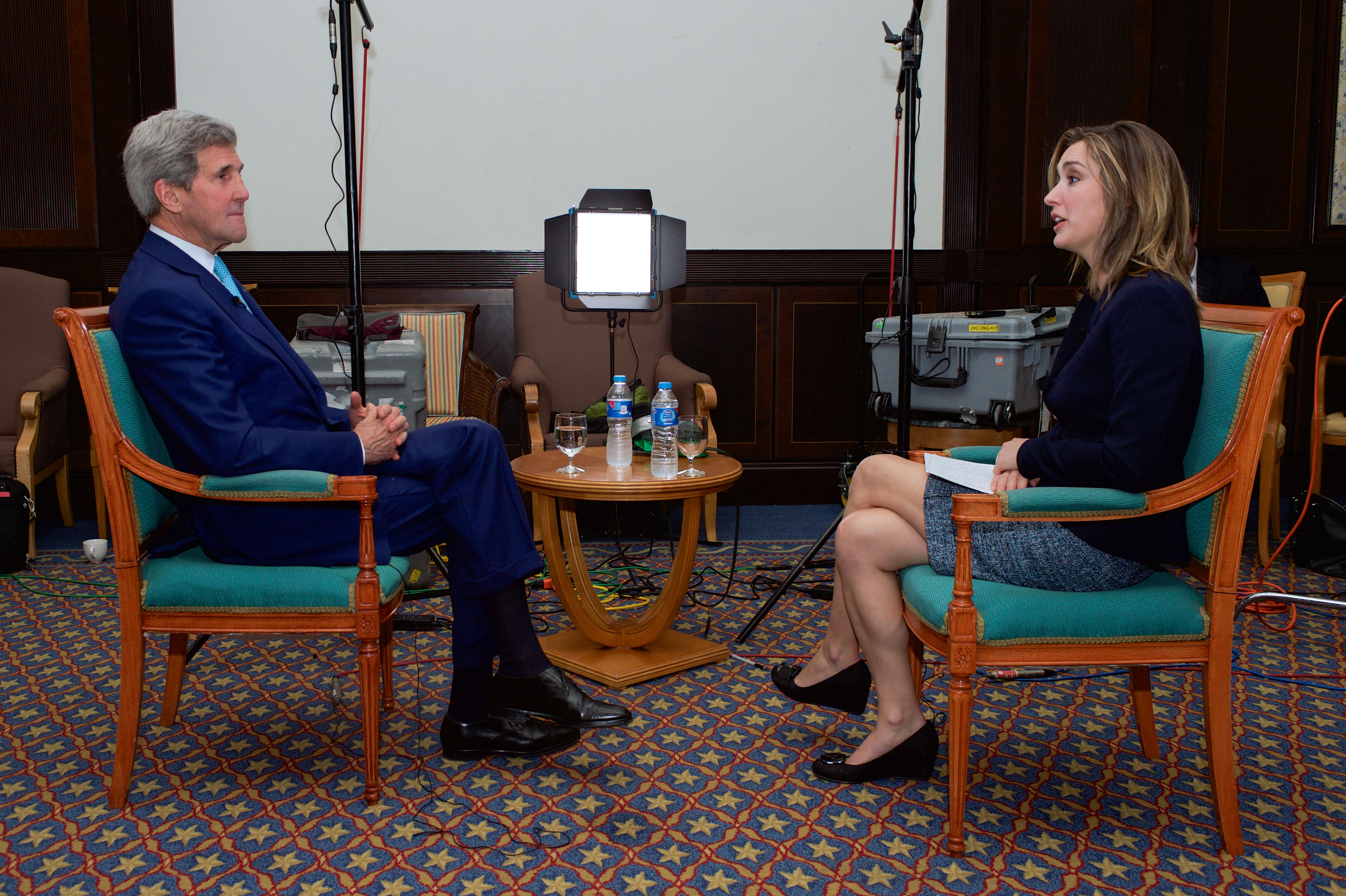
Brennan with Secretary of State John Kerry in 2015

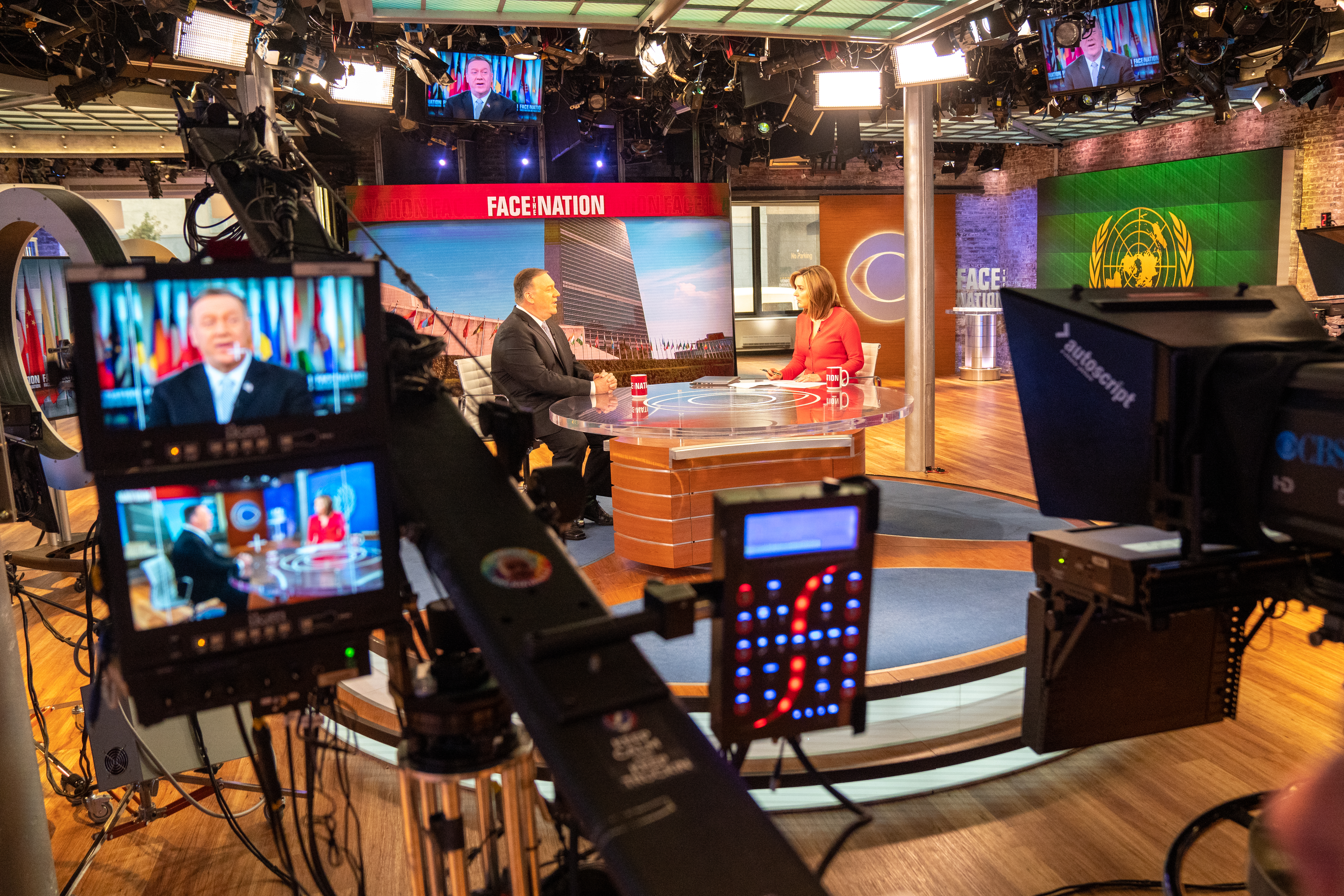
Brennan interviews US Secretary of State Mike Pompeo in 2019

Brennan joined CBS News in July 2012 and has been based in Washington since that time. She reported on the White House throughout the Obama and Trump administrations for CBS programs and is a substitute anchor on CBS This Morning and the CBS Evening News. Brennan was also part of the CBS News team honored with a 2012-2013 Alfred I. Dupont-Columbia Award for coverage of the Newtown tragedy.

Brennan's reporting has taken her to Tehran, Baghdad, Kabul, Beijing, and Havana. She has covered diplomatic negotiations, including the nuclear deal with Iran, the chemical weapons deal in Syria, and the reopening of relations with Cuba. She conducted the first US interview with South Korean President Park Geun-Hye, covering the president's hardline policy against North Korea.

The interview made headlines in Pyongyang and Seoul, where Brennan's etiquette was the topic of a morning show.

At a press conference on September 9, 2013, she asked Secretary of State John Kerry about any possibility for the Syrian government to avoid a U.S. strike. Kerry's answer, that Assad could "turn over every single bit of his chemical weapons to the international community in the next week" (although later his answer was retracted as "a rhetorical argument about the impossibility and unlikelihood of Assad turning over chemical weapons he has denied using" by a State Department spokesperson), led Russia's foreign minister Sergey V. Lavrov to propose this as a solution to the crisis.

On February 22, 2018, she was named the 10th moderator of Face the Nation, the CBS Sunday morning political interview program, becoming the second woman to moderate the program. On October 1, 2024, she was one of the moderators of CBS' 2024 United States vice presidential debate.

== Honors and awards ==
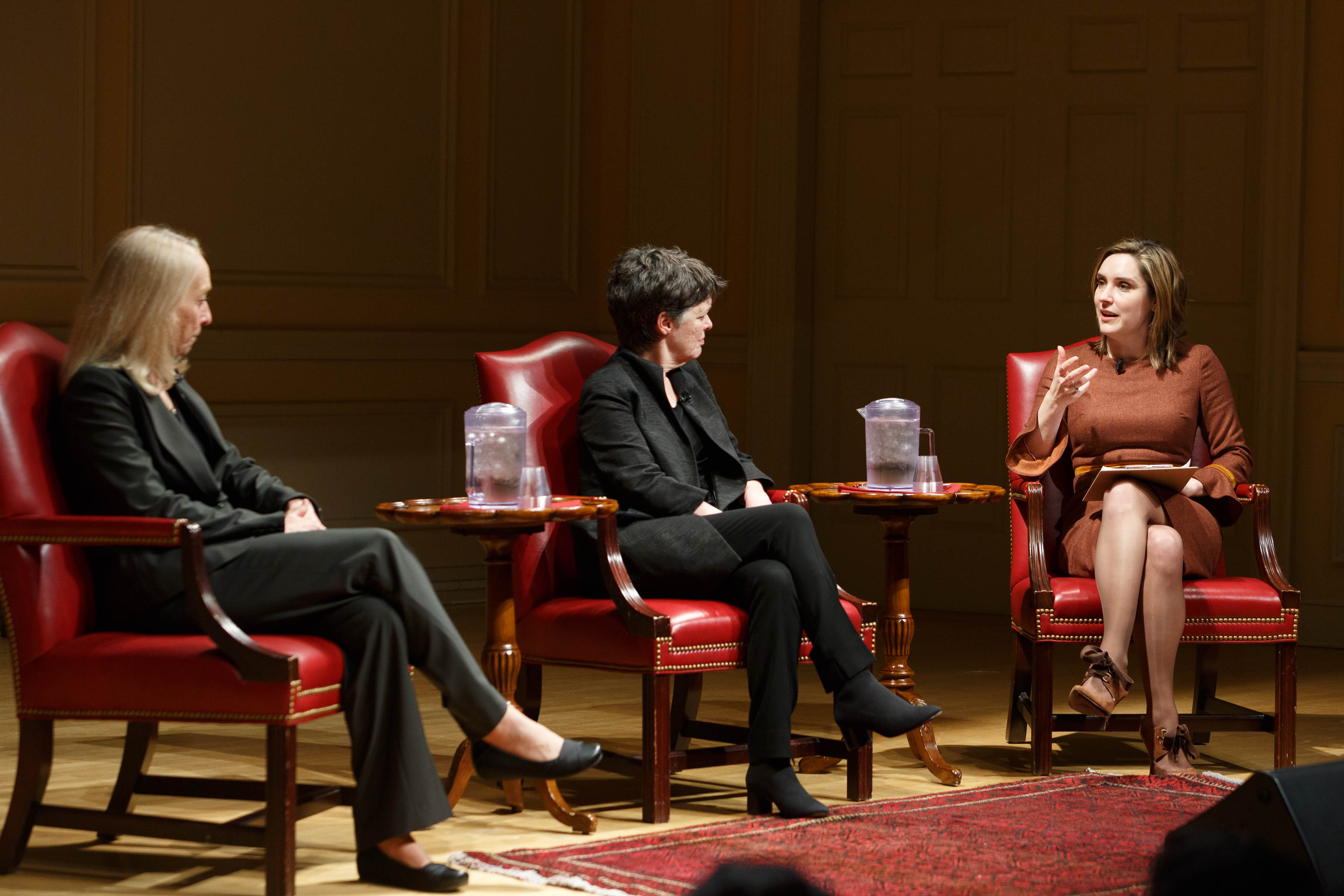
Brennan (right) speaks on Irish-American identity with Mary Gay Scanlon and Alice McDermott in 2020

Irish America magazine named her one of the top Irish Americans and one of the top 100 Irish-Americans in business and in media. In 2003, she was named one of the top journalists under the age of 30 by the NewsBios/TJFR Group.

Brennan received the Fulbright Award for International Understanding in 2010.

Brennan won an Emmy Award for "Outstanding News Special" for her coverage of the Parkland High School shooting. Brennan received two Emmy nominations for "Outstanding News Analysis", for her coverage of both the COVID-19 pandemic and Iran–United States relations.

In 2020, she won a Wilbur Award from the Religion Communicators Council. In 2021, she received first place in the National Headliner Awards for her coverage of the COVID-19 outbreak in "Facing the Pandemic".

== Personal life ==
On April 11, 2015, Brennan married Yado Yakub, a Syrian-American attorney who is a judge advocate in the United States Marine Corps. During an appearance on The Late Show with Stephen Colbert on April 30, 2018, Brennan announced she was pregnant with their first child, a boy who was born on September 11, 2018. Her second child, a son, was born on April 28, 2021.

Media offices
Preceded by John Dickerson	Face the Nation Moderator; February 22, 2018 – current	Incumbent
Preceded by David Begnaud (interim)	CBS Evening News anchor May 28, 2019 – May 31, 2019 (interim); June 12, 2019 - June 13, 2019 (interim)	Succeeded by David Begnaud (interim); Jim Axelrod (interim)
