= David Begnaud =

American journalist and news correspondent

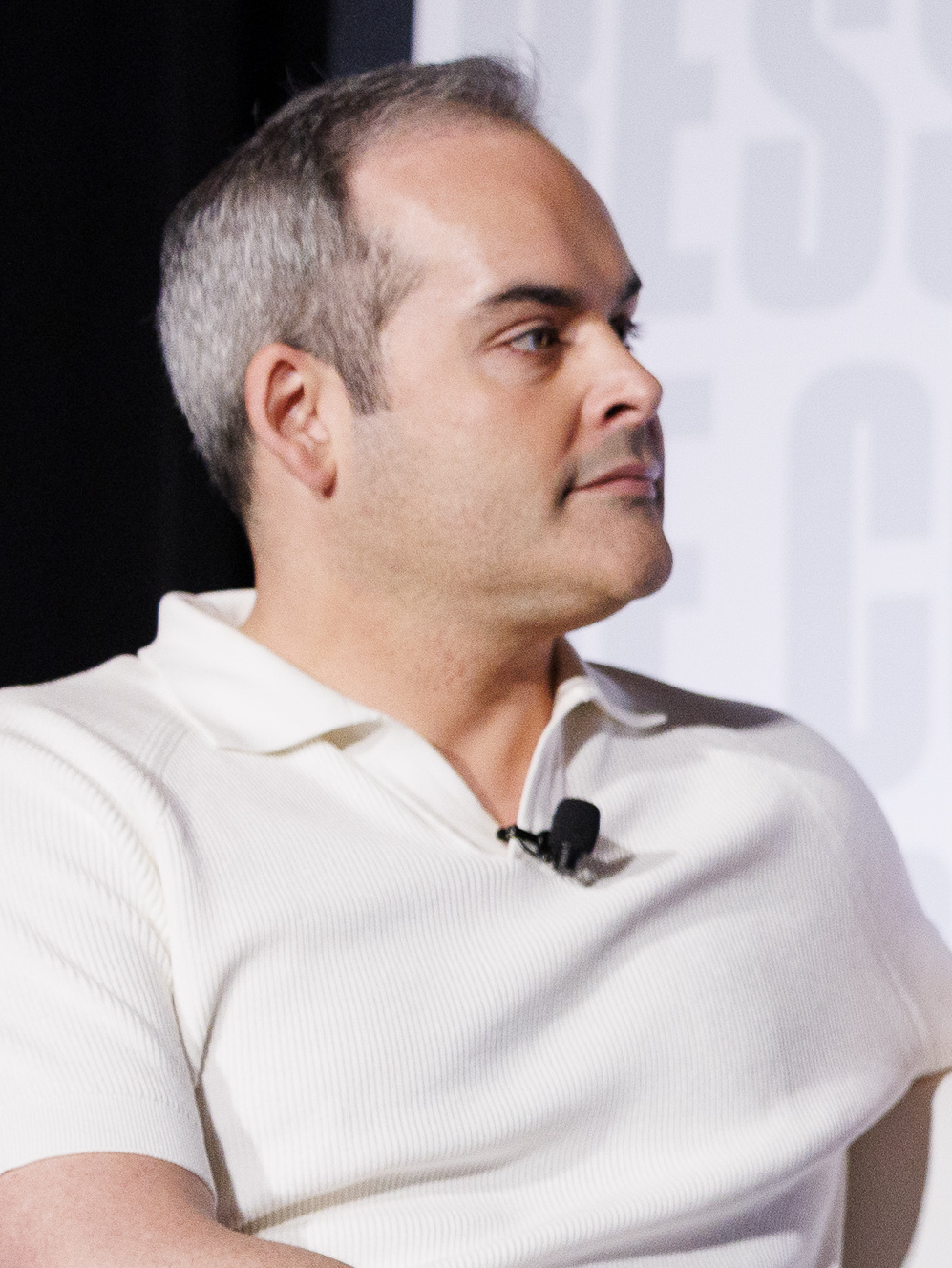
- Begnaud at the 2023 National Book Festival
- Born: June 13, 1983 (age 43); Lafayette, Louisiana, U.S.
- Education: University of Louisiana at Lafayette
- Occupations: Network News Journalist; Storyteller
- Years active: 2005–present

David Begnaud (born June 13, 1983) is an American television journalist who has worked for CBS News since 2015. His reporting has been featured across CBS News broadcasts and platforms including CBS This Morning, the CBS Evening News, 48 Hours, CBS Sunday Morning, as well as CBS News Streaming, CBS News' 24/7 streaming news service.

== Early life and education ==
Begnaud is from Lafayette, Louisiana, the heart of Cajun country. (Note: He is said to be a Cajun : He is a graduate of Teurlings Catholic High School (class of 2001). While in high school, Begnaud competed local and nationally in Speech and Debate making a name for himself as a high school orator. He credits speech with giving him the foundation for his story telling career in television. In 2023, Begnaud was honored with a Lifetime Achievement Award by the National Speech & Debate Association. NPR article.) He went to Catholic school and was an altar boy and Eucharistic minister. Begnaud received a bachelor's degree in general studies from the University of Louisiana at Lafayette in 2005.

== Career ==
Begnaud started his television career as a teen reporter, while in high school, at KLFY TV 10 in Lafayette, LA. When he walked into his first day of college at the University of Louisiana at Lafayette, Begnaud's instructor asked if he was the man she'd seen anchoring the evening news the night before. He was. Begnaud went on to anchor the weekend morning and evening editions of Eyewitness News, while attending college during the week. Begnaud worked at KSLA in Shreveport Louisiana from 2005 to 2007. He then joined KOVR in Sacramento, where he spent three years, before joining KTLA in Los Angeles. In 2015, CBS News named him the Miami-based correspondent for the network. He then relocated to the network's Dallas bureau in January 2017.

In September 2017, Begnaud was sent to Puerto Rico by CBS News to report on Hurricane Irma and remained there for Hurricane Maria. From various locations in Puerto Rico, Begnaud filed multiple reports of conditions on the ground that were broadcast through CBS News. In addition, Begnaud reported through his own various social media accounts. His social media accounts have been hailed for helping keep followers in the mainland US informed about the conditions in Puerto Rico.

After his time in Puerto Rico for Hurricane Maria, Begnaud continued to file reports through CBS news, or his own social media accounts, on topics related to Puerto Rico and the Hurricane Maria recovery. CBS news also continued to send Begnaud to various locations, including additional trips to Puerto Rico, to report on other breaking stories such as a mistreated children's case in California, wildfires in California, and undocumented immigrant children separations.

In July 2019, Begnaud was back in Puerto Rico reporting on the Puerto Rico protests, and the resignation of then governor Ricardo Rossello and was received warmly by the Puerto Ricans on the island, who see him as their ally.

== Personal life ==
Begnaud resides in Manhattan. In 2018, Begnaud reported to Washington Blade that he and his partner, Jeremy, of Los Angeles had been together for almost 12 years. He also stated that he had come out to his family 10 years earlier. Begnaud came out publicly on June 24, 2018, by posting a picture with his partner after seeing pride celebrations in New York City.

Begnaud was diagnosed with Tourette syndrome at age 6. In December 2018, he revealed this fact publicly; he said his parents never allowed him to use it as an excuse for not succeeding, and that Tourette's was one of the primary motivators for him to persevere and succeed in journalism. His tics, which are mainly nonvocal, include sniffing.

== Awards and honors ==
In February 2018, Begnaud was awarded the George Polk journalism award for public service for his work reporting on Puerto Rico and Hurricane Maria. Additionally, Begnaud received the Radio Television Digital News Association's First Amendment Leadership Award for his significant contribution to the protection of the First Amendment and freedom of the press. He was also designated a "Puerto Rican Champion" and participated in the 2018 Puerto Rican Day Parade in New York City. Begnaud is an honorary Puerto Rican highly esteemed by the people of Puerto Rico. In 2023, David was honored with the Alumni Lifetime Achievement Award from the National Speech and Debate Association. David credits speech, and his beloved speech coach, Josette Cook Surratt, with helping him find his voice, and himself.

== Notes ==
Media offices
| Preceded by Major Garrett (interim); Maurice DuBois (interim) | CBS Evening News anchor May 27, 2019 (interim); June 3, 2019 – June 11, 2019 (interim); July 1, 2019 - July 5, 2019 (interim) | Succeeded by Margaret Brennan (interim); Jim Axelrod (interim) |
