= Jim Axelrod =

American journalist

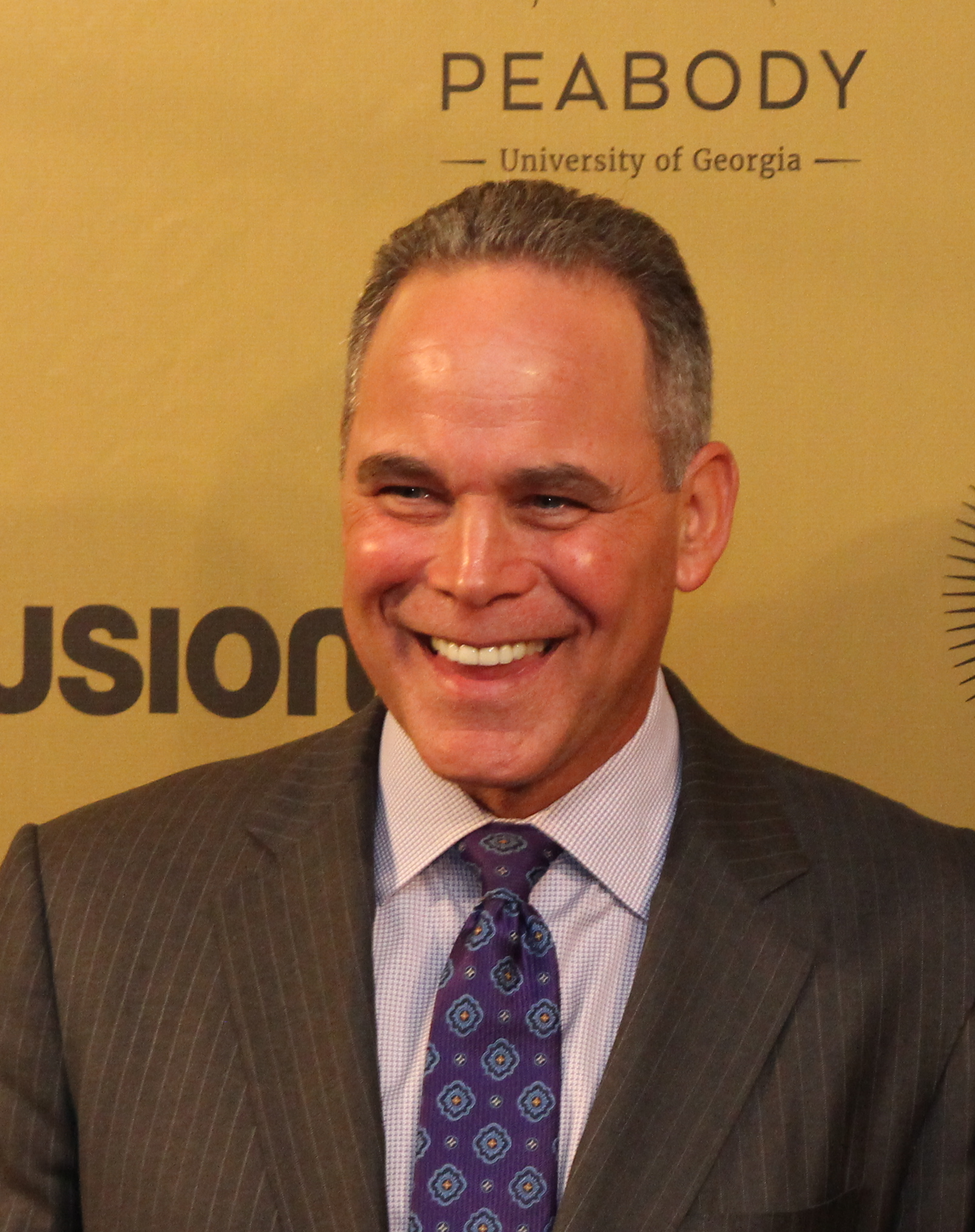
- Axelrod in May 2017
- Born: January 25, 1963 (age 63); New Brunswick, New Jersey, U.S
- Education: Cornell University (B.A.); Brown University (Master's)
- Occupation: Reporter
- Title: CBS News Chief Investigative Correspondent
- Spouse: Christina Axelrod
- Children: Emma Axelrod, Will Axelrod, Bobby Axelrod

Jim Axelrod (born January 25, 1963) is an American journalist. He is the chief investigative correspondent for CBS News and reports across all CBS News programs and platforms.

Axelrod was one of CBS News' embedded correspondents in Iraq and was the first TV reporter to broadcast live from Saddam International Airport, now Baghdad International Airport, after its takeover by American forces during the Iraq War.

== Early life and education ==
Axelrod was born on January 25, 1963, to a Jewish family in New Brunswick, New Jersey. Raised in Highland Park, New Jersey, he attended Highland Park High School. He received a B.A. in 1985 from Cornell University in history and an M.A. in 1989 from Brown University, also in history.

== Career ==
In 1989, Axelrod began his career in journalism at WVII-TV in Bangor, Maine. He subsequently was a general assignment and political reporter at WRAL-TV in Raleigh, North Carolina. Before WRAL, Axelrod worked at WSTM-TV in Syracuse, New York and WUTR in Utica, New York.

== Personal life ==
Axelrod resides in Montclair, New Jersey, with his wife and their three children.

Media offices
Preceded by Margaret Brennan (interim); David Begnaud (interim)	CBS Evening News anchor June 14, 2019 (interim); July 8, 2019 - July 12, 2019 (interim)	Succeeded by Maurice DuBois (interim); Norah O'Donnell
