= Ted Koop =

Theodore Frederick Koop (1907 – July 7, 1988) was an American journalist who worked for CBS.

== Early life ==
Born in Iowa, and a 1928 journalism graduate of the University of Iowa, Koop began his career at the Associated Press and later went to National Geographic.

== Time at CBS ==
At CBS, Koop hired Walter Cronkite, and also served as the first host of Face the Nation, with Senator Joseph McCarthy as the first guest. He later rose to vice president at CBS, and also offered to become a wartime censor in the event of nuclear war; he ultimately retired in 1971.

He also became the first broadcast journalist elected president of the National Press Club, in 1953.

== Later life ==
He died in July 1988. Koop's papers at held at his alma mater.
