= Guy Campanile =

Guy Campanile is an American journalist. He is the former executive producer of the CBS Evening News.
