= Face the Nation =

American public affairs TV program

- Genre: Public affairs/political talk program
- Created by: Frank Stanton
- Directed by: Sheldon Schwartz
- Presented by: Margaret Brennan (for past moderators, see section)
- Narrated by: John Hartge; Jim Bohannon (substitute)
- Theme music composer: Unknown artist (1954-1983); Eugene Clines and Richard Einhorn (1983–1992); Score Productions (1992–2002); Peter Fish (2002–2018); Man Made Music (2018–present)
- Country of origin: United States
- Original language: English
- No. of seasons: 73

Production
- Executive producers: Mary Hager Laird (2011–2025); Anne Hsu (2025–present)
- Producers: Anne Hsu, Avery Miller, Deanna Fry, Alana Anyse, Carol Ross Joynt, and Jake Miller (senior producers); Elizabeth Campbell, Jake Miller, Kelsey Micklas, Claire Moran, and Mia Salenetri
- Production locations: CBS News Washington Bureau, Washington, D.C.
- Camera setup: Videotape; Multi-camera
- Running time: 30 minutes (1954–2012); 60 minutes (2012–present)
- Production company: CBS News

Original release
- Network: CBS
- Release: November 7, 1954 – present

Face the Nation is a weekly news and morning public affairs program airing Sundays on the CBS Radio and television network. Created by Frank Stanton in 1954, Face the Nation is one of the longest-running news programs in the history of television.

Typically, the program features interviews with prominent American officials, politicians, and authors. Margaret Brennan has been the moderator of Face the Nation since 2018, though former host John Dickerson substituted during Brennan's maternity leave in spring and summer 2021. Upon Brennan's return to the program in September 2021, its title was changed to Face the Nation with Margaret Brennan.

The show's full hour is broadcast live from the CBS News Washington, D.C., bureau at 10:30 a.m. Eastern Time, though some stations delay or abbreviate episodes to accommodate local (usually church service) and sports programming.

In 2017, Face the Nation's audience was the largest of all Sunday public affairs programs, with an average of 3.538 million viewers. NBC competitor Meet the Press closely competed for the title in 2018, besting Face the Nation's audience for several months.

== Format ==
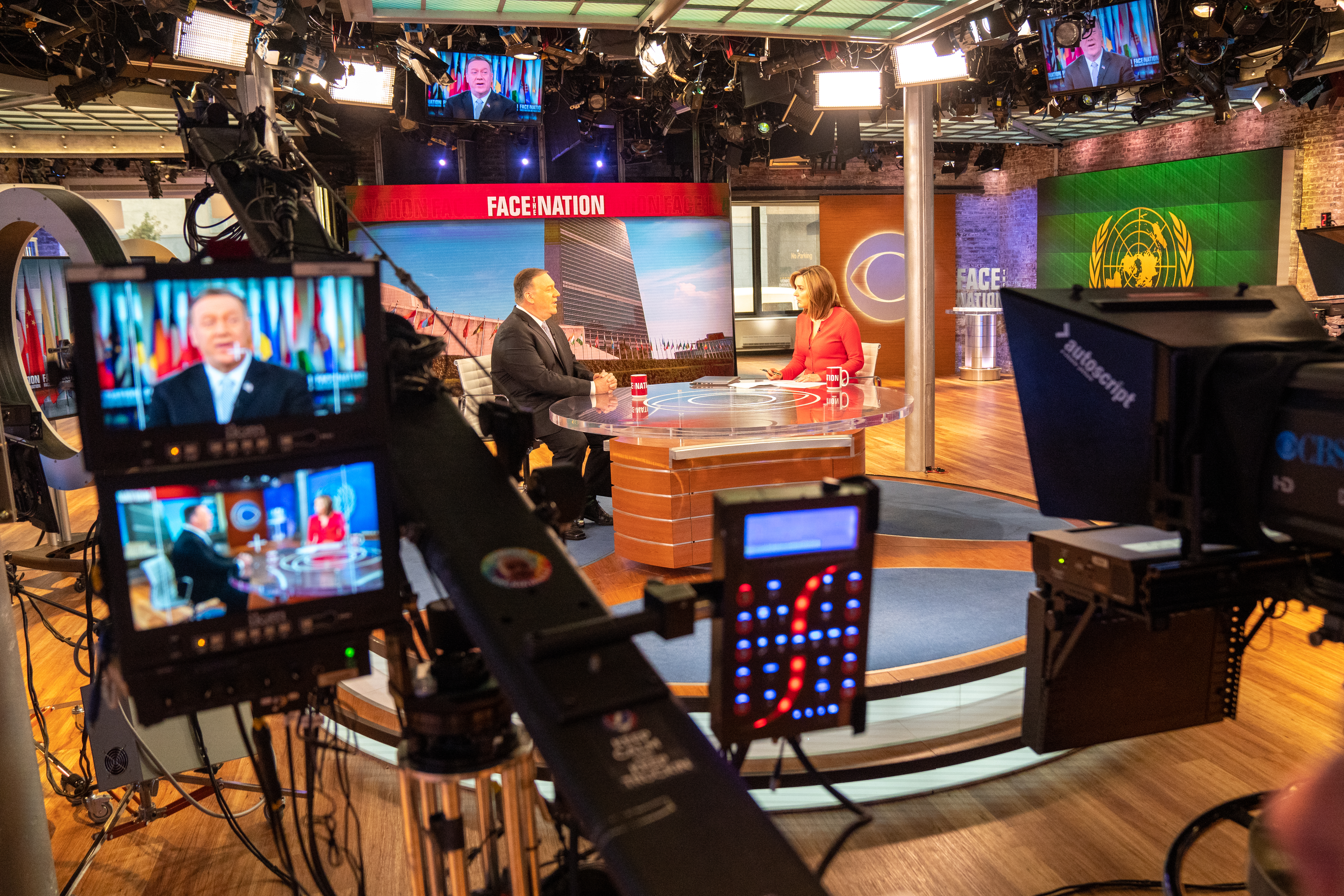
Margaret Brennan interviews US Secretary of State Mike Pompeo in 2019

Similar to its Sunday morning competitors, Face the Nation begins each episode with a short "tease" segment recapping the week's events and teasing the day's guests, set to the show's theme music.

The remainder of the program's first half-hour typically features interviews of prominent politicians, often lawmakers and cabinet or White House officials, responding to issues from the week's news.

The program's second-half hour transitions to more discussion-oriented segments, including interviews of notable authors with forthcoming books and a weekly roundtable discussion, with a rotating cast of panelists. The program's inclusion of a roundtable discussion has been indefinitely suspended since circa May 2020, the producers citing their desire to devote more time to interviews (and remained suspended in fall 2022).

Unlike some of its competitors, Face the Nation generally books only journalists and columnists for its panel discussions, omitting current and former politicians from providing punditry.

During major news events or breaking news, the program will often feature reports from various CBS News correspondents before the day's interviews, to allow guests the opportunity to respond to the latest news.

== Distribution ==
Face the Nation's first half-hour airs on CBS television stations throughout the United States, typically in the morning. In 2018, the CBS News digital streaming network began re-airing the program's full hour at 11:00 a.m., 3:00 p.m., and 6:00 p.m. Eastern Time.

Many of the network's affiliates in the Pacific Time Zone air Face the Nation at 8:30 a.m. local time, serving as a lead-in to the CBS Sports program The NFL Today during the football season.

A delayed audio broadcast of the program is also carried on a handful of radio affiliates through the CBS Radio Network, and in the late afternoon on C-SPAN's Washington area radio station WCSP-FM. CBS Radio also edits and distributes a slightly abbreviated version of the program as a weekly podcast.

=== Face the State ===
As a complement to the national program, several CBS affiliates, mainly based in state capital cities, carry their own programs leading into and out of Face the Nation titled Face the State dealing with state and local politics with the same format as Face the Nation, including KTVN in Reno, Nevada (in the same metropolitan area as Carson City), the stations of the Montana Television Network, WBNS-TV in Columbus, Ohio, WFSB in Hartford, Connecticut, and WHP-TV in Harrisburg, Pennsylvania, while Miami's CBS-owned station WFOR-TV has a complementary program titled Facing South Florida. Other stations carry the same format under other titles, such as For the Record on WISC-TV in Madison, Wisconsin.

== History ==
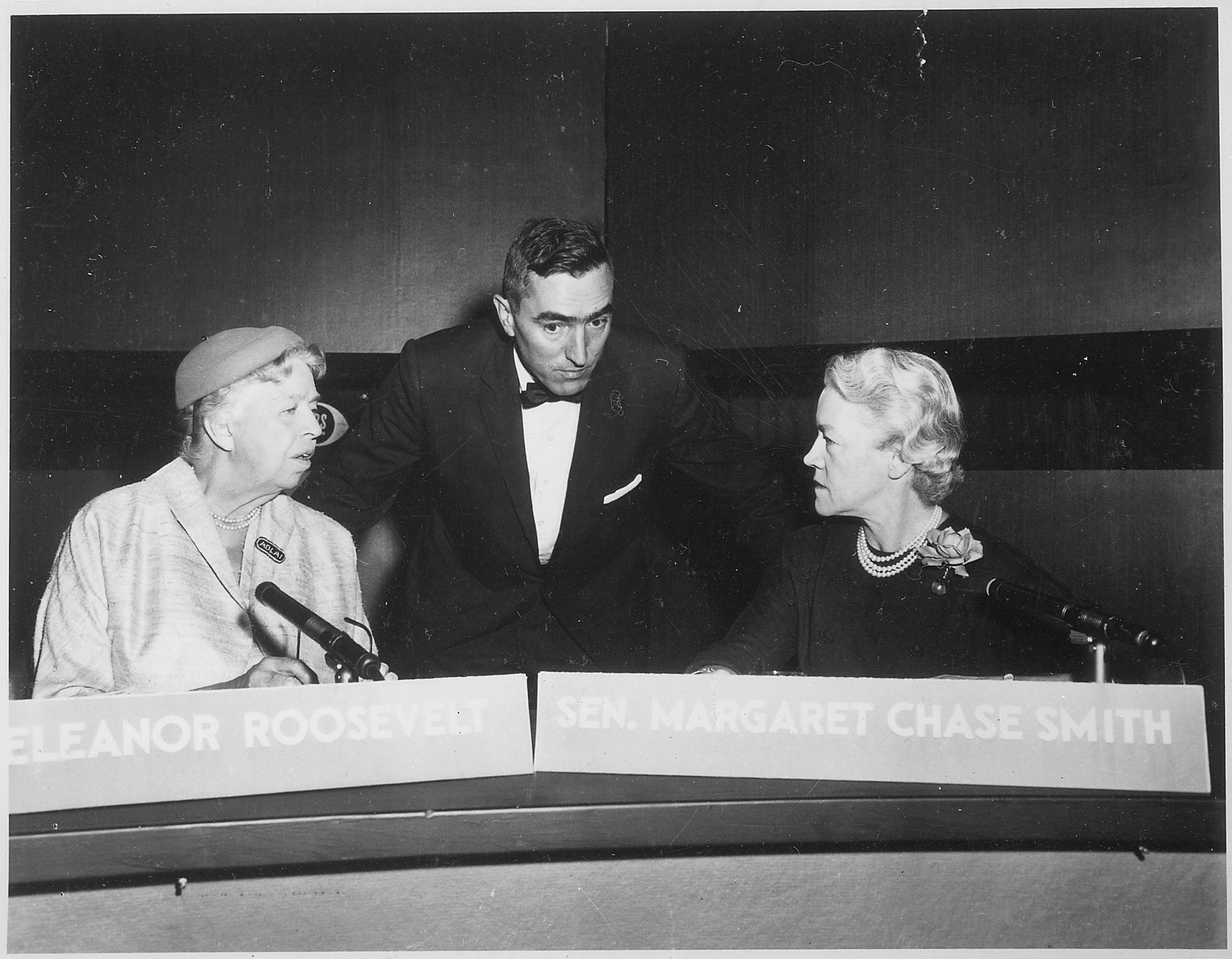
Eleanor Roosevelt and Margaret Chase Smith on Face the Nation on November 11, 1956.

Face the Nation premiered on November 7, 1954, and was originally broadcast on Sunday afternoons at 2:30 p.m. Eastern Time. Bill Shadel was then the Washington, D.C. bureau chief for CBS News. On that first program, the host was Ted Koop; his guest was Wisconsin senator Joseph McCarthy. Guests were rarely scheduled far in advance, in order to keep on top of current news stories.

=== Lesley Stahl ===
As the first female host of Face the Nation, Stahl became one of the most recognizable female faces on television. She held the position for eight years before stepping down to focus on 60 Minutes.

=== Under Schieffer ===
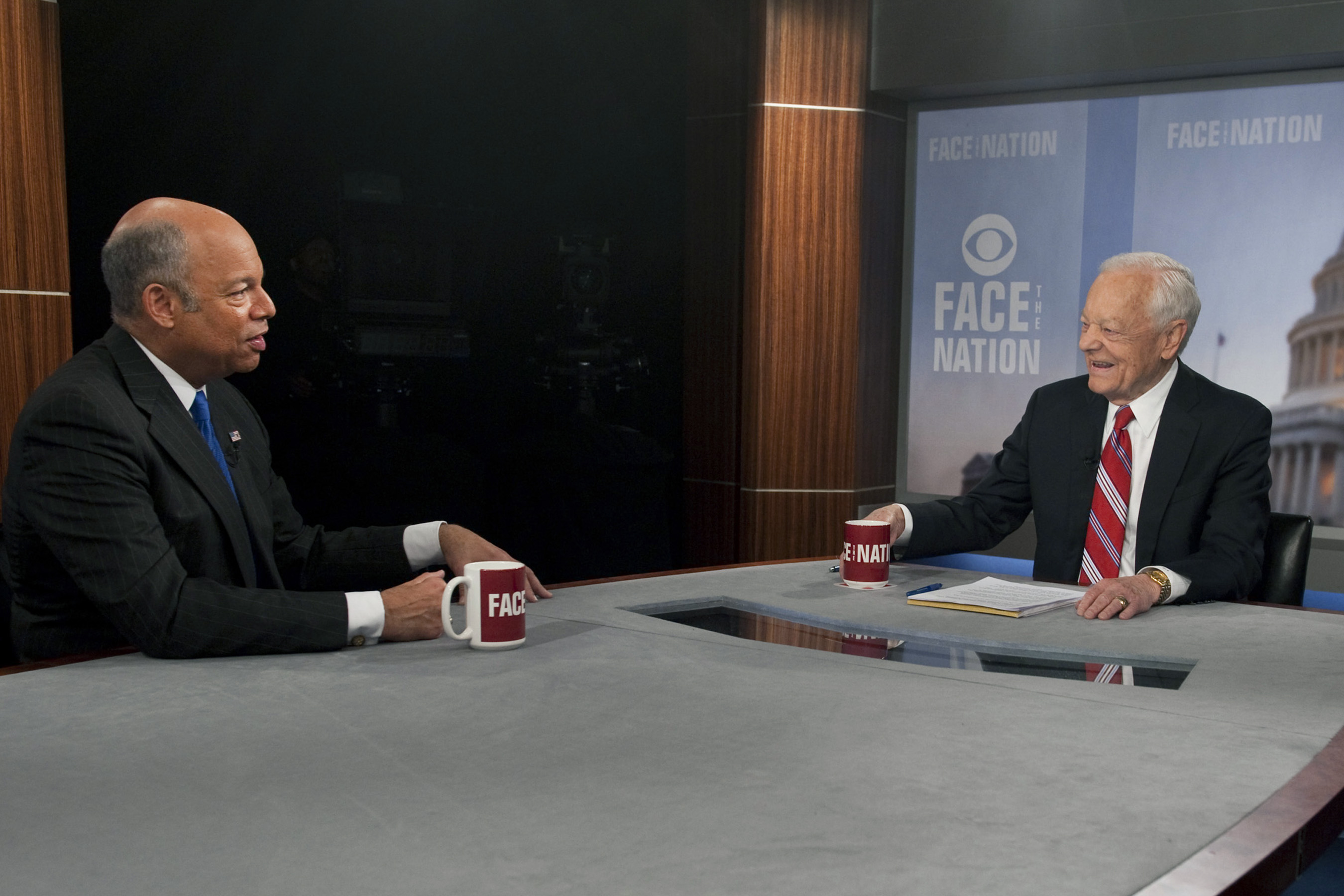
Schieffer interviewing Jeh Johnson in 2015

In 1991, Bob Schieffer took over as moderator for Lesley Stahl, who as previously mentioned, held the position for eight years. Under Schieffer, ratings boomed and the program extended its half-hour time frame to a full one hour. Ratings soared to over 3 million viewers every Sunday, as Face the Nation surpassed all competitors in the ratings. Schieffer won numerous awards with the program, including two Emmy's for Outstanding News Discussion & Analysis, an Edward R. Murrow Award, and the Overseas Press Club Award.

In July 2011, Face the Nation became the last Sunday morning talk program to begin broadcasting in high definition (leaving CBS' overnight news program Up to the Minute as the only American news program on the major broadcast networks and cable news channels that continued to broadcast in standard definition, until it converted to HD in late November 2012). Another big change came for the program in December 2011, when they permanently extended the half-hour broadcast to a full hour. The move came after Face the Nation's competitors, NBC's Meet the Press, ABC's This Week, and Fox News Sunday, all extended their programs to one-hour. The delay came from dispute among the network's affiliate stations.

On November 11, 2026, Bari Weiss eyed replacing ‘Face the Nation’ host Margaret Brennan as two top producers exit CBS show.

On November 12, 2026, Two top leaders are leaving CBS News’ ‘Face the Nation’.

=== After Schieffer ===
Logo used from 2014 to 2021.

In 2015, Bob Schieffer, the longest-serving moderator in the program's history, retired after 24 years. He was replaced by John Dickerson on June 7, 2015.

On February 22, 2018, CBS announced Margaret Brennan as the new host, replacing John Dickerson, who served as moderator for less than three years to let him focus on his anchor duties on CBS This Morning. Brennan is the second female host in the program's history, after Lesley Stahl.

Brennan conducted numerous interviews with members of the Trump administration, including former Secretary of State Rex Tillerson and House Oversight Committee Chairman Trey Gowdy. Margaret Brennan also serves as the network's senior foreign affairs correspondent. Brennan interviewed Vice President Mike Pence in her last episode before maternity leave.

== Moderators ==
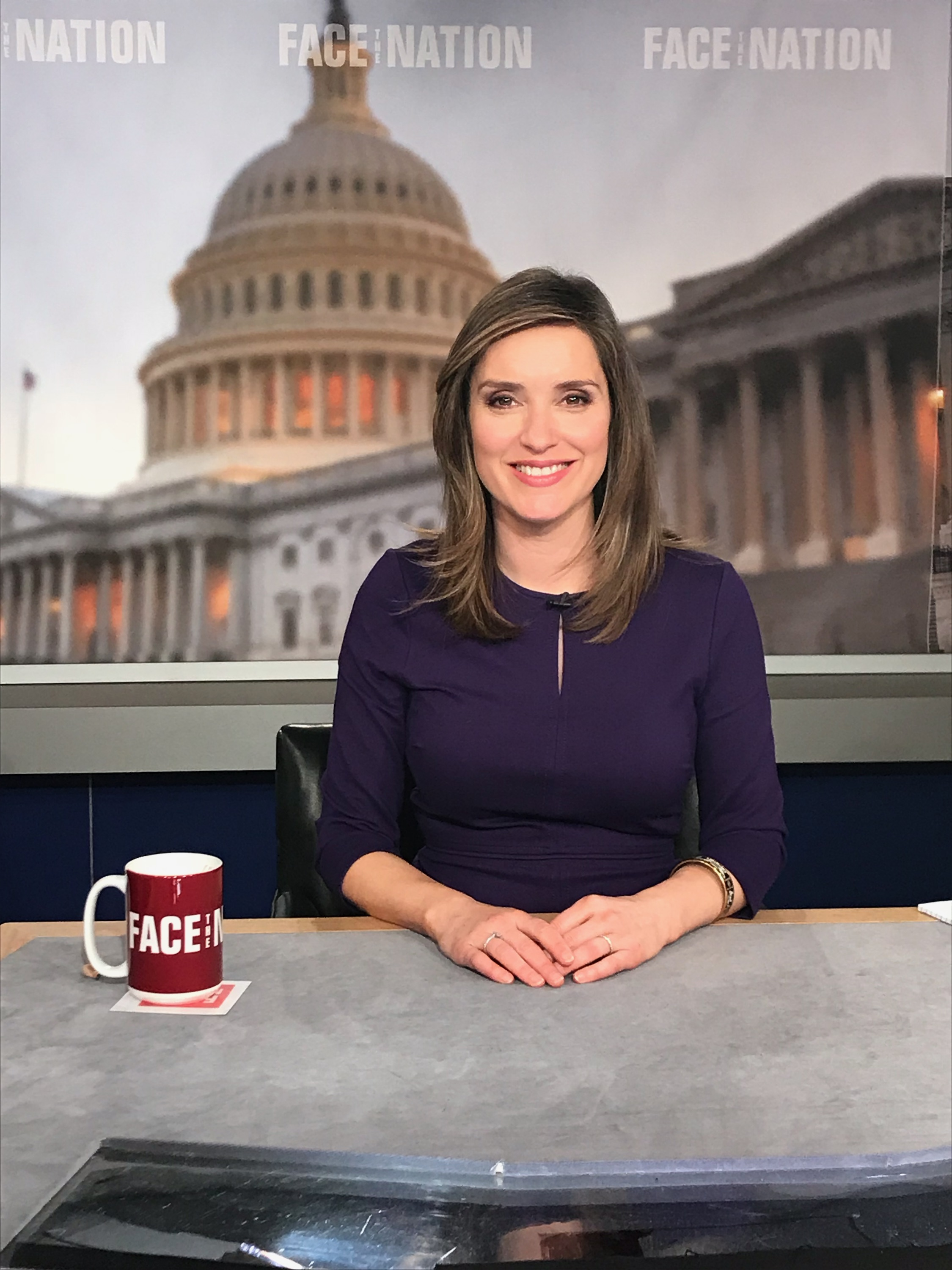
Current moderator Margaret Brennan

The program has been hosted by ten moderators to date, beginning with Ted Koop. The current moderator, Margaret Brennan, has hosted since February 2018.

The following is the list of moderators for Face the Nation:

Ted Koop	1954–1955
Stuart Novins	1955–1960
Howard K. Smith	1960–1961
Paul Niven	1961–1965
Martin Agronsky	1965–1968
George Herman	1968–1983
Lesley Stahl	1983–1991
Bob Schieffer	1991–2015
John Dickerson	2015–2018
Margaret Brennan	2018–present

== Program length ==
The program ran 30 minutes for much of its history. It expanded to 60 minutes for a preliminary 20-week period in April 2012, and was extended to that time length permanently on July 29, 2012. There is a deliberate break between the first and second half of the program, to allow local affiliates to begin airing another program if they wish to do so.

Approximately 81% of the stations affiliated with CBS air the second half-hour contiguously with the first; the remainder either do not air the second half-hour at all such as KDKA, or air that portion of the program on a tape delayed basis, because of station commitments to other programming (mainly station-produced NFL pre-game shows leading into The NFL Today, along with E/I commitments and advertorial, outdoors or religious programming). Other stations choose to air the second half-hour after primetime following their late local newscasts or in a later time slot as part of their late night schedule, though the number of stations carrying the full hour in pattern has increased over time with the end of former commitments as of 2017, from 64% in 2012.

Face the Nation was the last Sunday public affairs program to extend its length to a full hour. The move came as a way to draw viewers away from competitors.

== In popular media ==
Face the Nation has been mentioned by Stephen Colbert using the nickname "The Nation Face" on several occasions.

The comic strip Grin and Bear It satirized the show as "Faze the Nation".

== See also ==
- List of longest-running United States television series
