= Rome Hartman =

American television journalist and producer

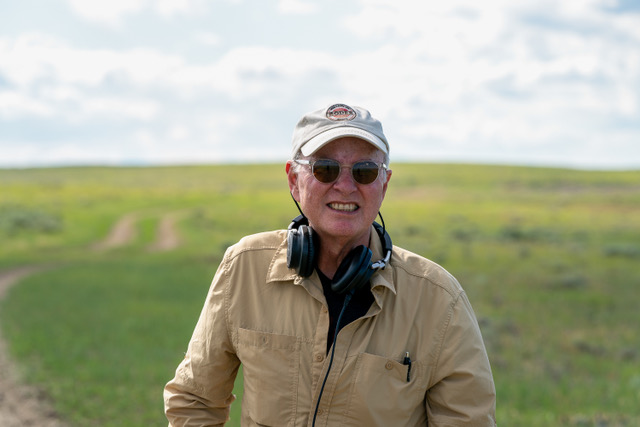
Rome John Hartman III

Rome John Hartman III is an American television journalist and producer.

== Early life and education ==
Hartman was born on August 11, 1955, in West Palm Beach, Florida. He attended Catholic primary and high school in West Palm Beach and graduated from Duke University in 1977 with a BA in political science. He served a term on the board of visitors at Duke University's Sanford School of Public Policy.

== Career ==
Hartman started his television journalism career in 1977, working at three local television stations in West Palm Beach, Miami, Florida, and Washington, D.C. In 1983, he launched his network career as a field producer for CBS News in the Atlanta bureau.

Hartman's tenure at CBS News began in 1983 as key producer in the coverage of major events. From 1986 to 1989, he worked as the White House producer and received his first national Emmy award for his coverage of the Reagan-Gorbachev summit in Reykjavik, Iceland. Hartman served as the senior producer for the CBS Evening News in Washington, D.C. from 1989 to 1991. He joined 60 Minutes as a producer in 1991, where he produced 100 segments for Correspondent Lesley Stahl between 1991 and 2005.
