= Andrew Cohen (filmmaker) =

American filmmaker and journalist

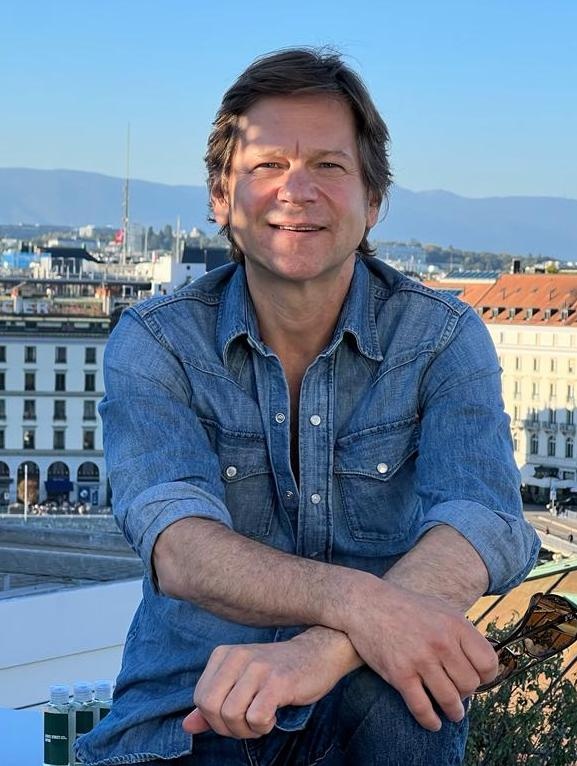
- Cohen in 2022
- Born: 16 March 1965 (age 61); New York, New York
- Occupations: Film director; film producer; journalist
- Website: www.acfilmsinc.com

Andrew "Andy" Cohen (born March 16, 1965) is a three-time Emmy nominated independent filmmaker whose recent films received three Academy Awards nominations spanning both scripted and documentary genres: The Apprentice in 2025 for Best Actor (Sebastian Stan), Best Supporting Actor (Jeremy Strong) and To Kill A Tiger in 2024 for Best Feature Documentary.

The founder of AC Films Inc, Cohen has directed, written, and produced feature-length and short-form films.

Cohen's work as a feature documentary producer includes among others To Kill a Tiger (2024, nominated Academy Award for Best Documentary), Ai Weiwei's Human Flow (2017, short-listed Academy Award for Best Documentary), Hooligan Sparrow (2016, short-listed Academy Award for Best Documentary), Ai Weiwei: Never Sorry (2012, short-listed Academy Award for Best Documentary), and The World Before Her (2012, Best Documentary Feature, Tribeca Film Festival).

His feature fiction titles include: Little Death (2024), starring David Schwimmer, directed by Jack Begert, written by Dani Goffstein and Jack Begert, produced alongside Psycho Films and Darren Aronofsky's Protozoa Pictures, which premiered at the 40th Sundance Film Festival in 2024, winning the Next Innovator Award and The Apprentice (2024 film).

== Early life ==
Born and raised in New York City, Cohen attended Trinity School until the 9th grade, after which he pursued an alternative education.

In 1986, he worked in the sound department at Dino De Laurentiis' non-union studio in North Carolina. After the boom operator broke his leg, Cohen operated the boom for the Freddie Fields produced, Bruce Beresford directed film Crimes of the Heart (1986) starring Diane Keaton, Jessica Lange, Sissy Spacek, and Sam Shepard.

== Career ==
He produced and co-wrote his first film from 1989-1996, Gaylen Ross' Dealers Among Dealers, about the New York City diamond business. Cohen would later co-write and produce Ross' 2008 documentary Killing Kasztner on the life and assassination of Rezso Kasztner.

From 2010 to 2013, Cohen directed and wrote a nine-part series of short films on China's leading contemporary artists in collaboration with Art Asia Pacific for which he is a contributing editor.

Cohen wrote, directed and produced the documentary Ximei (2019 Movies that Matter Activist Award), which premiered at the International Film Festival and Forum on Human Rights in Geneva. Produced by Ai Weiwei, the film is centered around Liu Ximei, a female subsistence farmer infected with AIDS during China's Black Blood Economy in the 1990s. Production of Ximei lasted seven years, due to interference from Chinese officials; Cohen's phone and internet messages were spied on and parts of footage were regularly confiscated.

Cohen participated in Global Geneva's first 'Youth Writes' (Young Journalists and Writers Initiative) workshop in Versoix, Switzerland, in March 2019, helping high school students better understand the role of documentary film reporting.

He wrote, directed and produced Beijing Spring (2021, Amnesty International / FIFA jury Award) which chronicles China's first Democracy movement and protest demonstration for artistic freedom following China's brutal Cultural Revolution.

His work has been screened at festivals around the world, including the Venice Film Festival, Telluride Film Festival, Tribeca Film Festival, Toronto International Film Festival, Berlin Film Festival, Sundance Film Festival and Cannes Festival and has been streamed on platforms such as Netflix, Amazon Prime, Apple TV+.

== Filmography ==
- Dealers Among Dealers (1996) – producer
- Killing Kasztner (2008) – writer, producer
- Ai Weiwei: Never Sorry (2012) – executive producer
- The World Before Her (2012) – executive producer
- Hooligan Sparrow (2016) – executive producer
- Human Flow (2017) – executive producer
- Ximei (2019) – writer, director, producer
- Beijing Spring (2020) – writer, director, producer
- To Kill a Tiger (2022) – executive producer, creative consultant
- Jackie the Wolf (2023) – producer, executive producer
- Little Death (2024) – producer
- The Apprentice (2024) – producer
- Mediha (2024) – executive producer
- Tacheles (2025) – writer, director, producer
- Ai Weiwei's Turandot (2025) – producer
- Village Gate (2026) – writer, director, producer
- Rough & Polished (2026) – writer, director, producer
- Ukraine Rising (2026) – writer, director, producer
