= Iberic (Carmen Herrera) =

Painting by Carmen Herrera

- Artist: Carmen Herrera
- Year: 1949
- Medium: acrylic paint, canvas, cardboard
- Movement: geometric abstraction
- Location: Metropolitan Museum of Art
- Accession: 2019.13

Iberic is 1949 painting by Carmen Herrera. It is in the collection of the Metropolitan Museum of Art.
