= The 100 Years Show =

- Directed by: Alison Klayman
- Starring: Carmen Herrera
- Release date: 2015
- Country: United States

The 100 Years Show is a 2015 short documentary film that follows the Cuban-American abstract, minimalist painter Carmen Herrera as she celebrates her 100th birthday. The film is directed by Alison Klayman, who also directed Ai Weiwei: Never Sorry.

== Background ==
Director Klayman became interested in Herrera's work after hearing about her in 2013. "When some people from Lisson Gallery told me about Carmen in fall 2013, I immediately made plans to visit her in New York. I thought she had a lot of wisdom to impart and a fascinating life story to accompany a stunning body of work, but also I was excited that telling her story would challenge me in several ways," Klayman said in an interview with T: The New York Times Style Magazine.

The film follows Herrera through her current daily work schedule while also taking a look at her long life.

The film premiered on Netflix and Vimeo On Demand on Sunday, September 18, 2016. A screening of the film accompanied the Whitney Museum of American Art's exhibition of Herrera's work, "Carmen Herrera: Lines of Sight."

On January 11, 2017, The 100 Years Show premiered in New York City at Film Forum alongside Everybody Knows...Elizabeth Murray, a film exploring the life and work of Elizabeth Murray. The screening received positive reviews from multiple sources, including Hyperallergic, Film Journal International, The Guardian, The Huffington Post, The New York Times, and was featured in a segment on CBS This Morning.

On January 10, 2017, in anticipation of the screening, director Alison Klayman and the director of Everybody Knows...Elizabeth Murray, Kristi Zea, appeared on The Leonard Lopate Show on WNYC radio in a segment titled, "Shattering the Art World’s Glass Ceiling." During the interview Klayman states, "This isn't a story of an older person who suddenly decided to take up painting...this is the story of a full life, of basically a full century of working."

== Critical reception ==
The film premiered at the Hot Docs Canadian International Documentary Festival in Toronto, ON, Canada. The film won Best Documentary Short at the 2015 Heartland Film Festival, the Ozark Foothills Film Festival, the Ashland Independent Film Festival, the River Run International Film Festival, the DOCUTAH Film Festival, and the Indigo Moon Film Festival. It won Best Director and Best Editing at the DOCUTAH Film Festival as well.
