= Jon Wertheim =

Journalist and author (born 1970)

- Born: Lewis Jonathan Wertheim; November 11, 1970 (age 55); Bloomington, Indiana, US
- Education: Yale University
- Occupations: Journalist, editor
- Years active: 2020–present
- Notable work: Sports Illustrated (staff writer, since 1997)
- Spouse: Ellie Jill Spielberger (m. 1999)
- Children: 2

Lewis Jonathan Wertheim (born November 11, 1970, in Bloomington, Indiana), also credited as L. Jon Wertheim, is an American sports journalist and author who has produced work in most major forms of media. He is a senior writer for Sports Illustrated and has been part of the magazine's full-time writing staff since 1996.

As a correspondent for 60 Minutes on CBS, Wertheim has covered a wide range of topics within and outside of sports. He is the author of eleven books and is an on-air tennis commentator, primarily for Tennis Channel. He has hosted and been a guest on multiple sports and news podcasts. He was executive producer and on-air reporter for the 2025 HBO Max documentary Surviving Ohio State.

== Sports Illustrated ==
Wertheim is Senior Enterprise Writer for Sports Illustrated. He writes stories about professional tennis, basketball, mixed martial arts and other sports as well as deeply interviewed stories about the athletes who participate. He has also written stories that cover broader cultural and legal issues that relate to sports. Examples are his reporting on the use of anabolic steroids by elite athletes and the Ohio State University abuse scandal. The Ohio State reporting ("Why Aren't More People Talking About the Ohio State Sex Abuse Scandal?"),^{[2]} focused on the decades-long abuse of male wrestlers by the team doctor, as well as the university's cover-up. It was the basis for the 2025 HBO Documentary Films Surviving Ohio State for which Wertheim was Executive Producer and on-air reporter. Aired by HBO Max, the documentary received a duPont-Columbia journalism award.

Wertheim writes the weekly Tennis Mailbag for SI.com, in which he responds to readers questions and comments about the sport, business, and culture of tennis.

== 60 Minutes and CBS News ==
Wertheim has been a correspondent for the CBS News program 60 Minutes since 2017 where he has covered diverse topics including Denmark's increasing wealth due to new-generation weight-loss drugs, George Clooney's Broadway role as pioneering journalist Edward R. Murrow, and the prevalence of Australian actors in Hollywood. He was one of the reporters for the episode "A Central Ally/The Lost Music" which received an Emmy nomination. He has been the author of a number of extended interviews with sports stars such as Caitlin Clark and Rafael Nadal. On December 14, 2025, 60 Minutes aired a Wertheim story on the remarkable turnaround of the Indiana Hoosiers football team from his hometown of Bloomington, Indiana. Not just an athletic story, it also covered how changes in the business of modern college sports have affected what has happened for the Hoosiers team.

Wertheim has produced stories for CBS News Sunday Morning including "Daria Kasatkina, the world's bravest tennis player" about the Russian-born player who is openly gay and has been an outspoken critic of Russia's war on Ukraine. Kasatkina has since become a permanent resident of Australia.

On December 21, 2025, 60 Minutes aired a Wertheim story about the Kanneh-Mason siblings, virtuoso classical musicians from Nottingham, England.

=== Leadership changes at CBS News ===
Changes in 2025 and 2026 at CBS News resulted in significant upheaval in the 60 Minutes organization. Under Bari Weiss's leadership firings included Sharyn Alfonsi, Cecilia Vega, Draggan Mihailovich, and correspondent Scott Pelley. Executive Producer Tanya Simon was also fired and replaced with Nick Bilton. Three remaining correspondents: Lesley Stahl, Bill Whitaker, and Wertheim put out a statement on June 5, 2026, that they would be staying on saying in part "We don’t want to see 60 Minutes die."

== Books ==
Wertheim is the author of eleven books, including Strokes of Genius: Federer, Nadal, and the Greatest Match Ever Played, which gives a stroke by stroke analysis of the 2008 Men's Singles Wimbledon final between Roger Federer and Rafael Nadal and is a co-author (along with Toby Moskowitz) of the New York Times bestseller Scorecasting: The Hidden Influences Behind How Sports Are Played and Games Are Won, a wide-ranging statistical analysis of common misconceptions in American sports.

- (2021) Glory Days: The Summer of 1984 and the 90 Days That Changed Sports and Culture Forever
- (2016) This Is Your Brain on Sports: The Science of Underdogs, the Value of Rivalry, and What We Can Learn from the T-Shirt Cannon with Sam Sommers
- (2014) You Can't Make This Up: Miracles, Memories, and the Perfect Marriage of Sports and Television with Al Michaels
- (2014) The Rookie Bookie with Tobias J. Moskowitz
- (2012) Scorecasting: The Hidden Influences Behind How Sports Are Played and Games Are Won with Tobias Moskowitz, L.
- (2010) Blood In The Cage: Mixed Martial Arts, Pat Miletich, and the Furious Rise of the UFC
- Strokes of Genius: Federer, Nadal, and the Greatest Match Ever Played (2009)
- (2009) Venus Envy: Power Games, Teenage Vixens, and Million-Dollar Egos on the Women's Tennis Tour
- (2008) Running the Table: The Legend of Kid Delicious, the Last Great American Pool Hustler
- (2005) Transition Game: How Hoosiers Went Hip-Hop

== On air television commentary ==
Wertheim is an on-air commentator for Tennis Channel, regularly attending the Grand Slams and other tournaments where he often conducts on-court interviews with winning players after their matches. In 2025 and 2026, he was among the analysts and interviewers at the French Open tennis tournament in Paris, France, for TNT Sports.

In a hot mic incident on November 9, 2024, Wertheim made a joking comment about player Barbora Krejčíková's appearance, unaware he was on air. In response to his comment, Krejčíková posted a disappointed reaction on social media and Wertheim publicly apologized to her. He was temporarily suspended from Tennis Channel, returning on-air in January, 2025

== Podcasts and social media ==
Wertheim was host for two Sports Illustrated podcasts. Beyond the Baseline (2018–2022) covered a variety of tennis topics and interviews with players, coaches, and others involved with the sport behind the scenes. For the podcast The Record (2020), Wertheim selected and discussed seven of the most consequential Sports Illustrated stories "about the moments that defined the most legendary athletes in sports." Since its inception in 2024, Wertheim has been a regular contributor to Andy Roddick's Served podcast which can also be watched on YouTube. He has been a frequent guest on other podcasts, including multiple appearances on The Dan Patrick Show, CBS Sunday Morning with Jane Pauley, and The Rich Eisen Show.

Wertheim maintains a social media presence, posting regularly on X/Twitter and Instagram.

== Awards ==
2026 Recipient duPont-Columbia award for "Surviving Ohio State" (HBO Max)

2023 Nominee 75th Writers Guild of America Awards "The Longest Running Oil Spill" – 60 Minutes (CBS News) Shared with Oriana Zill de Granados

2022 Recipient International Tennis Hall of Fame Special Award Eugene L. Scott Award for communicating honestly and critically about the game, and having a significant impact on the world of tennis.

2020 Nominee Emmy Awards Outstanding Arts, Culture and Entertainment Report "A Central Ally/The Lost Music" 60 Minutes (CBS News) Shared with Katherine Davis and Bill Owens

2019 Nominee Sports Emmy Awards Outstanding Sports Long Documentary "Strokes of Genius" Shared with: Ken Solomon, Angus Wall, Linda Carlson, Paul Davies, Mick Desmond, Justin Falvey, Darryl Frank, Bob Whyley, and Andrew Douglas

== Personal life and education ==
Wertheim has two adult children and lives in New York City with his wife. In an interview for the New York Times before 2023's US Open tennis tournament, Wertheim talked about his writing habits and his pleasure in finding something "off the beaten path" to appreciate in the city. He described a Sunday routine that includes grocery shopping at Trader Joe's.

He has an undergraduate degree from Yale University and a Juris Doctor degree from the University of Pennsylvania.
