= Tanya Simon =

American television producer

Tanya Simon is an American television producer. She was the executive producer of the news magazine program 60 Minutes, the first woman to hold the position.

== Career ==
Simon earned a Bachelor of Art in comparative literature from Columbia University.

In 1996, Simon began working as a researcher for the CBS News program 48 Hours. She became an associate producer for 60 Minutes in 1999 or 2000, eventually becoming a senior producer and later the executive editor of the show. At 60 Minutes, she collaborated with correspondent Ed Bradley on coverage of the September 11 attacks.

In April 2025, Simon was named interim executive producer of 60 Minutes following the resignation of Bill Owens in April 2025. A group of 60 Minutes correspondents, including Sharyn Alfonsi, Anderson Cooper, Scott Pelley, Lesley Stahl, Cecelia Vega, and Jon Wertheim, reportedly sent a letter urging George Cheeks, the co-CEO of Paramount Global, to appoint Simon as the permanent executive producer of the show.

On May 28, 2026, CBS dismissed Simon from her producer position, and appointed journalist Nick Bilton to replace her. 60 Minutes correspondent Cecilia Vega and executive editor Draggan Mihailovich were also fired by the network, the same week that correspondent Sharyn Alfonsi confirmed that her contract had not been renewed.

Simon has earned various awards for her work, including Emmy Awards, a Peabody Award, and a DuPont-Columbia Award.

== Personal life ==
Simon is the daughter of Bob Simon, a former correspondent for 60 Minutes.
