= Brandy Melville =

Multinational clothing brand

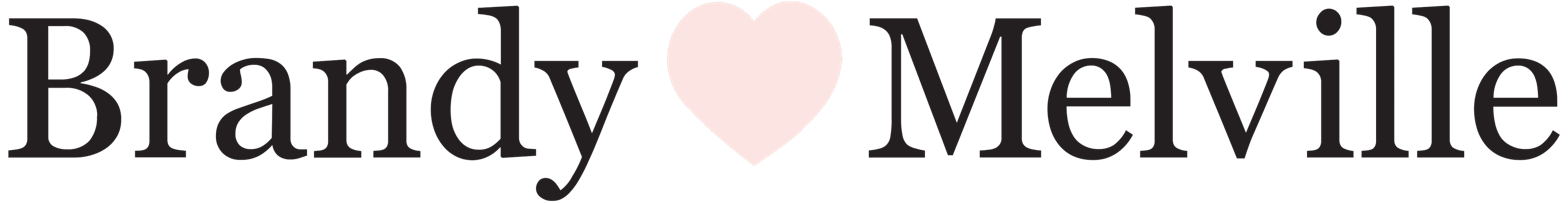

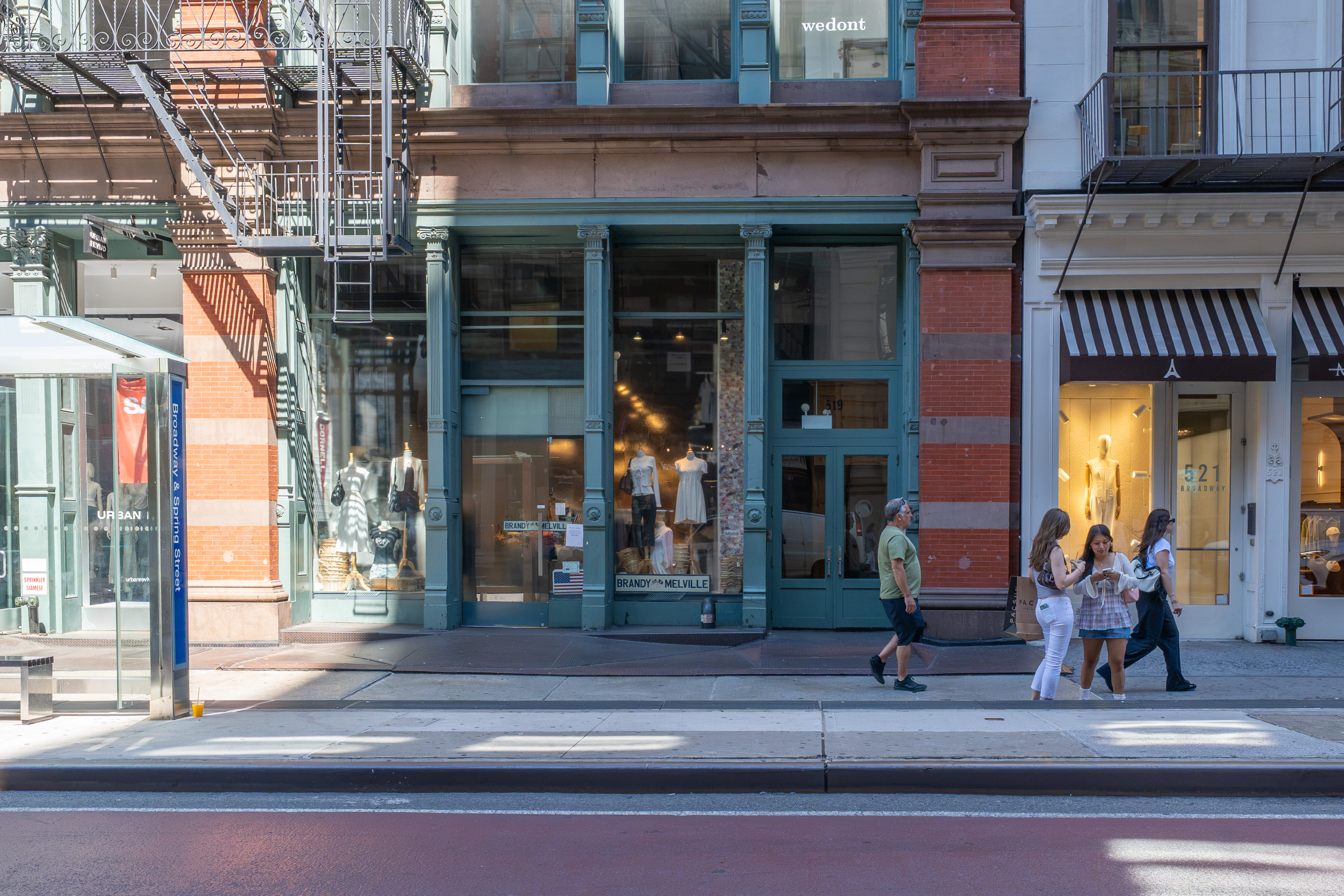
- Flagship Store in SoHo, Manhattan
- Industry: Fashion
- Founders: Silvio Marsan
- Number of locations: 133
- Key people: Stephan Marsan (CEO); Salvatore Rianna (CFO)
- Products: Apparel
- Website: brandymelville.com

Brandy Melville is a multinational fast-fashion clothing company owned by Stephan Marsan. Established in Italy by Silvio Marsan, it gained international popularity after switching to a California-based style and reaching American consumers.

The company's products are sold in physical stores in Europe, the United States, Asia, Canada, and Australia, as well as on their website. The stores feature a bleached wood theme and muted color palette.

The retailer has faced controversy for making clothes of only one size, and following the slogan 'One size fits all'. The retailer has also faced numerous accusations of reclusive leadership, persistent bigotry, and discrimination.

== History ==
Silvio Marsan and his son Stephan founded Brandy Melville in Italy in the early 1980s, and opened their first US store in 2009, in the Westwood area of Los Angeles, which borders the UCLA campus. Stephan is now the company's CEO. The brand name and logo is inspired by the fictional tale of two people – Brandy, an American girl, and Melville, an Englishman, who met and fell in love. The business grew popular among young girls, in part due to their Malibu teen aesthetic. Thirty-six Brandy Melville outlets have opened across the globe in the fifteen years since the brand began retailing in the United States.

On April 4, 2026, Brandy Melville opened in Winter Park, Florida. Despite little announcement from the company, local magazines and journals reported crowds packed inside and lines wrapped outside the store for much of the day.

== Market and target demographic ==
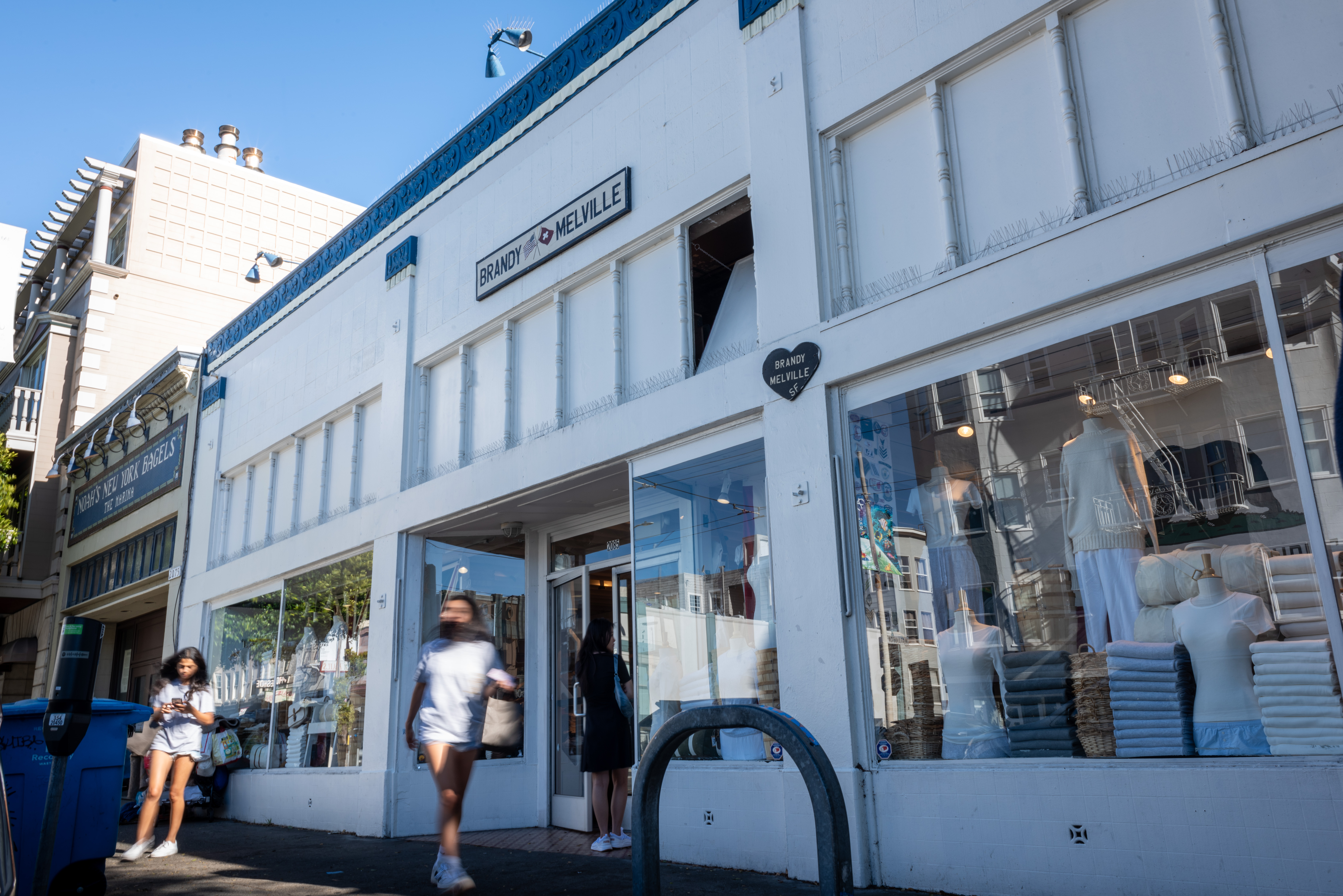
A Brandy Melville store in San Francisco.

Brandy Melville has been described as trendy fast fashion, and their most prominent buyers are teenage girls looking for fashionable clothing from popular name brands. Brandy Melville has maintained a significant presence in the market, making over $212 million in sales in 2023 and operating about 100 stores globally. The brand is considered by its fans to be a part of the "Coquette aesthetic". The product research team consists of teenage employees, starting at age 14, who attempt to keep the company's styles contemporary and on trend. Kjerstin Skorge, an employee at the company's Santa Monica store, said, "There are all kinds of things that we get asked, and we give our honest opinion". The company relies on the opinions and advice of their employees as they are a part of their target market.

The company does not use traditional advertising and instead depends heavily on social media marketing and partnerships. Ariana Grande wears Brandy Melville, helping promote the brand. Well-known stores such as PacSun and Nordstrom also sell the company's products. There is very little evidence of company representatives speaking on record, rarely any promotional press, and there has been a rumor that the employees are not allowed to discuss the company's history or the identity of the CEO with anyone.

Brandy Melville sells a sub-brand named John Galt (or J. Galt), named for the character in Ayn Rand's novel Atlas Shrugged and referring to CEO Stephan Marsan's interest in Libertarianism.

In April 2024, Brandy Melville opened a sister store named St. George. Unlike its parent brand that takes a one-size-fits-all approach, St. George is more size-inclusive, offering sizes from small to at least large. The most recent post on the official Brandy Melville Instagram referencing the St. George brand was in June 2023, where it referred to St. George as a standalone coffee shop opening in New York. Brandy Melville has another coffee shop in The Grove, a shopping center in Los Angeles. The brand's website lists 5 standalone St. George locations in Santa Monica, Chicago, 2 stores in London, and the store previously mentioned location in Los Angeles. The coffee shop in New York is not listed. The official St. George Instagram, joined in September 2023, also lists London, Santa Monica, Chicago, and Los Angeles with no mention of a New York in its bio.

Yellow Rat Bastard, originally a New York-based men's streetwear retailer, is another clothing brand associated with Brandy Melville. Y.Y.G.M. SA, the company that holds the Brandy Melville trademark, has also filed U.S trademark applications for Yellow Rat Bastard covering clothing and retail services. Yellow Rat Bastard merchandise is sold in Brandy Melville stores alongside products from John Galt and St. George.

== Controversies ==
Brandy Melville has faced considerable backlash for its "one-size" policy (generally considered to be a size small or extra-small), narrowly promoting a skinny aesthetic, and predominantly limiting hiring to girls who can fit into its clothes. Because of their "one-size" policy, ethical questions about the brands integrity and morals have been raised. Backlash against the brand is common, because of their sizing policy, which excludes the majority of body types besides those who are small or extra small. Brandy Melville's sizing policy was criticised by proponents of the Body Positivity Movement, which emphasizes acceptance and inclusion of all body types. Brandy Melville has attempted to broaden their policy from "one-size fits all," as it originally proclaimed, to "one-size fits most." While the new slogan was intended to give clarity towards their sizes being directed towards more petite customers, some felt that the change still implied that the majority of people are supposed to be able to fit in their clothes. In the 2024 documentary film Brandy Hellville & the Cult of Fast Fashion directed by Eva Orner, it was mentioned that former employees talked about their struggles with eating disorders, body dysmorphia, and maintaining a positive body image while working at the stores and feeling forced to fit into the brand's clothes.

According to a former store owner, CEO Stephan Marsan has said he doesn't want black people shopping at his stores or working in publicly visible areas as it would hurt the brand. Marsan and other top executives routinely shared jokes about Adolf Hitler and the Holocaust in a group chat titled "Brandy Melville gags". Hitler was reportedly mentioned 24 times in 150 message screenshots reviewed by Insider, including one image that showed Marsan's head photoshopped onto Hitler's body—an image he allegedly created himself. In Vanity Fair, James Pogue wrote that the brand has a reputation as "fashionwear for girls with 'fascist leanings'". In 2025, Brandy Melville's store in Korea drew backlash for staff who couldn't speak Korean and only in English.

Brandy Hellville & the Cult of Fast Fashion detailed extensive allegations of bigotry and body shaming at the company; these included claims that white employees were more likely than others to be assigned roles in the front of the store, that Marsan collected full-body photos of his young female employees, a sexual assault that happened at a New York City apartment controlled by the company, and that hiring and firing decisions were explicitly made based on the appearance of employees, among others. The film also discussed the brand's fast fashion status. Brandy Melville is a fast fashion retailer and it is criticized as environmentally harmful and incompatible with long-term sustainability. The rapid expansion of the fast fashion industry highlights how Brandy Melville has generated significant profits while contributing to environmental degradation. Brandy Melville has faced criticism for many forms of exploitation, including its marketing toward and employment of teenage girls, as well as reports of Chinese immigrant workers producing its clothes under poor conditions in Prato, Italy. The film discussed how the company's business model is unclear, with each store being owned by a different shell company while the trademark itself is owned by a Swiss company. Marsan was also criticized for his elusive online and public presence. The documentary implied the company's business model was designed to be untraceable.

Despite these controversies and concerns about the brand's ethics, they are still prospering, with a reported earning of around 282-million-dollar profit from their US operations in 2025. Some believe that Brandy Melville remains a popular brand because of their clothing quality. Although they are a fast fashion company, a high majority of their clothing items are made of 100% cotton, as well as other natural fibers like wool and silk.

Many pose environmental concerns about Brandy Melville, since they are a fast fashion brand. Brandy Melville discloses little to no information about the creation of their clothing's environmental impacts, or the innerworkings of their company to the public.
