= American Dharma =

2018 British-American documentary film

- Theatrical release poster
- Directed by: Errol Morris
- Produced by: Errol Morris; Steven Hathaway; Marie Savare; P.J. van Sandwijk; Robert Fernandez
- Starring: Steve Bannon; Errol Morris
- Cinematography: Igor Martinovic
- Edited by: Steven Hathaway
- Music by: Paul Leonard-Morgan
- Production companies: Fourth Floor Productions; Maje Productions; Storyteller Productions; Moxie Pictures
- Distributed by: Utopia
- Release dates: September 4, 2018 (Venice); November 1, 2019
- Running time: 95 minutes
- Countries: United States; United Kingdom
- Language: English
- Box office: $51,891

American Dharma is a 2018 documentary film directed by Errol Morris. The film follows the career of political strategist Steve Bannon. The film was released on November 1, 2019, by Utopia.

== Synopsis ==
American Dharma consists of a dialogue between documentary subject Steve Bannon and director Errol Morris focusing on Bannon's film-making, time as the executive chairman of Breitbart News, time as the chief executive of Donald Trump's 2016 United States Presidential campaign, time on the United States National Security Council for Trump's administration, and commentary on several films. The documentary is segmented into five sections: The Fog of #war, Honey Badgers, Angry Voices, What Have I Done?, and Go F#ck Yourself. Morris's documentary cuts together footage from Twelve O'Clock High, The Searchers, The Bridge on the River Kwai, The Man Who Shot Liberty Valance, Chimes at Midnight, The Candidate, In the Face of Evil: Reagan's War in Word and Deed, Generation Zero, My Darling Clementine, Paths of Glory and audio from The Fog of War: Eleven Lessons from the Life of Robert S. McNamara as Bannon addresses these films’ effects on his perceptions and beliefs. The interview takes place on a set replicating the air-strip and Quonset hut from Twelve O'Clock High and they watch clips from these films on a projector out of frame. The documentary juxtaposes interview footage with related filmography, archival footage, and graphics displaying news headlines during the presidency and candidacy of Trump.

== Production ==
Errol Morris cites his desire to understand the United States 2016 Presidential Election, "So that we can try to make sure it doesn't happen again", as inspiration for the film. The decision to interview Steve Bannon specifically was brought on by the filmmaker's reading of Michael Wolff's Fire and Fury. In an interview with WBUR-FM, Morris says that Bannon "was flattered that I wanted to make a movie about him". "And I'm always looking for a different way in. Doesn't matter exactly what that way in, but it has to be different if you expect to get something that you haven't heard before. My way in was through his obsession with the movies, in particular a 1949 movie, 'Twelve O'Clock High,' starring Gregory Peck."

Morris interviewed Bannon for five days between February and April in Boston. The Quonset hut used as a set for the interview was constructed for American Dharma as a replica of the set in Twelve O'Clock High. The set was constructed on top of an abandoned airfield. Morris first heard about Bannon's love of Twelve O'Clock High in Joshua Green's Devil's Bargain. According to the director, "He [Bannon] loved walking through the set." The film's penultimate shot, wherein the Quonset hut has burned to the ground, was captured using a drone.

Bannon was not dressed by the crew; it was his choice to wear three shirts on set. During the filming, Bannon was reading a book on the Great Wall of China.

15 to 16 hours of footage was recorded during the interviews. Cut footage from the film made use of Morris's interrotron device, which allows for both first person perspective and eye contact between the interviewer and the subject. Morris decided not to use the interrotron, "very late in the game". During the Lawfare Podcast, Morris cites his fatigue with the use of the interrotron and desire to do something different and more adversarial as reasons for the change. In post-production, Morris showed Bannon 20 minute cuts of the film, but retained decision making on the final cut. The film was nearly titled "American Carnage" after Donald Trump's inaugural address.

== Soundtrack ==
Paul Leonard-Morgan's soundtrack includes tracks with titles in line with key notes from American Dharma. "Charlottesville" is named after the city in Virginia where the Unite the Right rally occurred in 2017. "American Carnage" is named in reference to Trump's 2017 inauguration speech, wherein the phrase "American Carnage" was employed to describe the United States in an apocalyptic frame. Tracks such as "Andrew Breitbart", "Comey", and "Mueller" denote Andrew Breitbart, James Comey, and Robert Mueller respectively as figures that, while not interviewed by Errol Morris, appear prominently in archival footage. Tracks "Falstaff", "Paradise Lost", and "The Bridge" recall Chimes at Midnight, Paradise Lost, and The Bridge on the River Kwai. Each aforementioned media form appears prominently within the documentary as Steve Bannon discusses his interpretations of these works.

=== Track listing ===
American Dharma (2018) by Errol Morris

All music is composed by Paul Leonard-Morgan.

No.	Title	Length
1.	"American Dharma"	5:05
2.	"Fear of the Unknown"	4:12
3.	"Globalism"	1:52
4.	"Revolution"	1:02
5.	"Charlottesville"	4:38
6.	"The Freak Show"	2:27
7.	"Political Power"	3:48
8.	"American Carnage"	2:43
9.	"Angry Voices"	3:06
10.	"Andrew Breitbart"	2:39
11.	"A Revolution Is Coming"	4:56
12.	"Billy Bush"	4:35
13.	"Apocalypse"	2:50
14.	"Executive Orders"	2:33
15.	"Corrupt"	1:22
16.	"American Horror"	1:28
17.	"Comey"	3:18
18.	"Falstaff"	4:08
19.	"Paradise Lost"	0:34
20.	"Mueller"	1:39
21.	"The Bridge"	2:48
22.	"In the Face of Evil"	1:22
23.	"The Accusers"	3:56
24.	"Go F**k Yourself"	2:42
25.	"Trust No One"	4:11
Total length:		73:54

== Release ==
American Dharma premiered at the 75th Venice International Film Festival on September 4, 2018, in the "out of competition" category. Steve Bannon was not present at the premier event in Venice. The film premiered in Canada at the 2018 Toronto International Film Festival (TIFF) on September 9. The United States premiere occurred on September 29, 2018, at the New York Film Festival (NYFF). American Dharma was subsequently screened alongside a talk given by Errol Morris at the International Documentary Film Festival Amsterdam (IDFA) on November 18.

In August 2019, the film was purchased by the distribution company Utopia and slated for a theatrical release on November 1, 2018, at the Film Forum in New York City. The trailer for theatrical release was premiered with outlet IndieWire on September 19. The Film Forum release weekend resulted in a reported $7,522 in revenue. After 10 weeks of release, American Dharma had a box-office revenue of $50,250, and ended the run with a total revenue of $51,891. On January 31, 2019, the film was made available for streaming on Kanopy. Since then, American Dharma has been made available on other streaming and VOD services.

== Reception ==
The review aggregator website Rotten Tomatoes gives the film an approval rating of 62%, based on 60 reviews. The website's consensus reads, "American Dharma offers a fascinating glimpse of a political influencer's public persona - and a frustrating missed opportunity to interrogate his actions and stated beliefs." On Metacritic, the film has a score of 62 out of 100, based on 22 critics, indicating "generally favorable" reviews.

=== Accolades ===
Year	Group	Award	Result
2018	Chicago International Film Festival	Best Documentary	Nominated

== See also ==
- The Brink (2019), a documentary by Alison Klayman about Steve Bannon's attempt to build a global populist movement.
