= Never Forget National Humiliation =

Never Forget National Humiliation: Historical Memory in Chinese Politics and Foreign Relations is a 2012 political science book written by Zheng Wang, an associate professor in the School of Diplomacy and International Relations at Seton Hall University.

== Plot ==
Wang's book investigates the reasons why the CCP managed to continue increasing its political power after the government's suppression of the Beijing Spring in 1899. He described Jiang Zemin's 1991 patriotic education campaign as a national re-education campaign, which required junior high and high schools to provide core history courses, as well as the construction of 100 "memory sites" regarding Chinese history, forty percent of which were related to past conflict and wars with foreign nations, such as Japan in its 1931–1945 war with China.

The book has been described by researcher Su-Jeong Kang as focusing less on the actual events that occurred in the history of China and more than on "what the Chinese population chose to remember and what they chose to forget", thus attempting to explain the behavior of post-Tiananmen China through the lens of historical memory, which the book considers to be an influential factor in the molding of modern Chinese identity and worldview.
