= Equilibrium (Carmen Herrera) =

Painting by Carmen Herrera

- Equilibrium (Carmen Herrera)
- Artist: Carmen Herrera
- Year: 2012
- Medium: acrylic paint, canvas
- Movement: geometric abstraction
- Dimensions: 48 in (120 cm) × 60 in (150 cm)
- Location: Metropolitan Museum of Art
- Identifiers: The Met object ID: 725932

Equilibrium is 2012 painting by Carmen Herrera. It is in the collection of the Metropolitan Museum of Art.
