= The Brink (2019 film) =

2019 American documentary

- Poster
- Directed by: Alison Klayman
- Produced by: Alison Klayman; Marie Therese Guirgis
- Starring: Steve Bannon
- Cinematography: Alison Klayman
- Edited by: Brian Goetz; Marina Katz
- Music by: Ilan Isakov; Dan Teicher
- Release date: 30 January 2019 (Sundance Film Festival)
- Running time: 91 minutes
- Country: United States
- Language: English

The Brink is a 2019 documentary film, directed by Alison Klayman. The film is produced by Marie Therese Guirgis, and Alison Klayman under the banner of AliKlay Productions, Claverie Films, and RYOT Films. The film stars Steve Bannon.

== Plot ==
The film follows Bannon from his latter days in the Trump administration to just after the 2018 midterms as he attempts to form a global populist movement with like-minded individuals such as Nigel Farage, Marine Le Pen, Jair Bolsonaro, Viktor Orban, Kent Ekeroth, Filip Dewinter, and others.

== Cast ==
- Steve Bannon
- Nigel Farage

== Reception ==
On the review aggregator Rotten Tomatoes, the film holds an approval rating of 84%, based on 103 reviews, with an average rating of 7.2/10. The website's critical consensus reads, "The Brink won't change many minds about its subject, but it remains a compelling – if perhaps difficult to watch – look at a divisive ideological lightning rod." Metacritic, which uses a weighted average, assigned the film a score of 71 out of 100, based on 25 critics, indicating "Generally favorable reviews".

New York Magazine's David Edelstein wrote that the film is "the year’s most urgent documentary — the one you need to see this week, not this year." In his positive Variety review, Owen Gleiberman wrote "The Brink is a far better and more penetrating film than Errol Morris’s Bannon portrait, American Dharma, which let Bannon bathe in his own aura." He also says "Bannon has a way of revealing himself when he thinks he’s not."

David Fear of Rolling Stone wrote in his review "Portrait of a Political Charlatan in Winter": "The Brink, Alison Klayman’s insightful and often unnerving look at one of the most divisive figures in recent memory, isn’t a particularly fun or easy watch". He also says the director's "methodology feels like a combo of fly-on-the-wall and give-’em-enough-rope.". A. O. Scott of The New York Times gave the film a Critic's Pick.
