= White Hot: The Rise & Fall of Abercrombie & Fitch =

2022 American documentary film

- Promotional poster
- Directed by: Alison Klayman
- Produced by: Emmet McDermott; Hayley Pappas; Alison Klayman
- Cinematography: Julia Liu
- Edited by: Jen Fineran; Colleen Flanagan; Brian Goetz; Steph Ching
- Music by: Amy Wood
- Production companies: AliKlay Productions; Secondnature Productions; Cinetic Media; All3Media; Cannibal Content
- Distributed by: Netflix
- Release date: April 19, 2022
- Running time: 88 minutes
- Country: United States
- Language: English

White Hot: The Rise & Fall of Abercrombie & Fitch is a 2022 American documentary film made for Netflix and directed by Alison Klayman. The film focuses on Abercrombie & Fitch's massive success and controversies during the late 1990s and 2000s. It was released on April 19, 2022.

== Synopsis ==
White Hot: The Rise & Fall of Abercrombie & Fitch details the store's success and controversies, including its racist and exclusionary practices. The documentary focuses on the rise in popularity of the brand after the arrival of CEO Mike Jeffries in 1992, and his practices which led to a 2003 class-action suit which alleged racial and other forms of discrimination in the stores’ hiring policies. Director Alison Klayman explores the company's toxic culture, featuring interviews from some of the original participants in the class action lawsuit. The documentary also features Samantha Elauf, who was rejected by Abercrombie for employment due to wearing a headscarf to the interview. Abercrombie fought back and the case ultimately went to the Supreme Court in 2015, which ruled in favor of Elauf.

== Reception ==
On the review aggregator website Rotten Tomatoes, 66% of 29 critics' reviews are positive.

== See also ==
- Brandy Hellville & the Cult of Fast Fashion
