= Jagged (film) =

- Promotional release poster
- Directed by: Alison Klayman
- Produced by: Jaye Callahan; Alison Klayman; Kyle Martin
- Starring: Alanis Morissette
- Cinematography: Alison Klayman; Julia Liu; Tasha Van Zandt; Sebastian Zeck
- Edited by: Brian Goetz
- Production companies: HBO Documentary Films; Ringer Films
- Distributed by: HBO
- Release dates: September 13, 2021 (TIFF); November 19, 2021
- Running time: 97 minutes
- Country: United States
- Language: English

Jagged is a 2021 American documentary film directed by Alison Klayman. It follows the life and career of musician Alanis Morissette centering on the release of her 1995 album Jagged Little Pill.

The film's world premiere occurred at the Toronto International Film Festival on September 13, 2021. It was released on November 19, 2021 by HBO as part of its Music Box series of music documentary films.

== Release ==
It had its world premiere at the 2021 Toronto International Film Festival on September 13, 2021.

== Reception ==
=== Critical reception ===
Jagged holds a 78% approval rating on review aggregator website Rotten Tomatoes, based on 18 reviews, with a weighted average of 6.60/10.

=== Morissette's response ===
On September 10, 2021, The Washington Post reported that Morissette was unhappy with the film and would not attend its premiere at the 2021 Toronto International Film Festival. On September 14, Morissette issued a statement stating: "I agreed to participate in a piece about the celebration of Jagged Little Pill’s 25th anniversary, and was interviewed during a very vulnerable time (while in the midst of my third postpartum depression during lockdown). I was lulled into a false sense of security and their salacious agenda became apparent immediately upon my seeing the first cut of the film. This is when I knew our visions were in fact painfully diverged. This was not the story I agreed to tell. I sit here now experiencing the full impact of having trusted someone who did not warrant being trusted. I have chosen not to attend any events around this movie for two reasons: one is that I am on tour right now. The other is that, not unlike many “stories” and unauthorized biographies out there over the years, this one includes implications and facts that are simply not true. While there is beauty and some elements of accuracy in this/my story to be sure, I ultimately won’t be supporting someone else’s reductive take on a story much too nuanced for them to ever grasp or tell." Prior to Morissette's statement, Alison Klayman stated: "Of course, it would have been great if she could be here with us, but I’m so grateful for all the time that she did put into making this film."
