= Chasing Asylum =

2016 documentary film

- Directed by: Eva Orner
- Produced by: Eva Orner; Annabelle Johnson (co-producer)
- Cinematography: Corey Baudinette; Khadim Dai; David Bacon; Michael Downey
- Edited by: Annabelle Johnson
- Music by: Cornel Wilczek
- Release date: 2016
- Running time: 90 minutes
- Country: Australia
- Language: English

Chasing Asylum is a 2016 documentary film directed and produced by Eva Orner. It examines Australia's treatment of asylum seekers and refugees.

== Production ==
The movie is a mix of interviews, news stories, press conferences and footage shot secretly inside the detention camps.

== Reception ==
Rotten Tomatoes lists 12 critics with 11 assessed as fresh and 1 as rotten. It gave the film a score of 92%.

The Guardian's Luke Buckmaster gave it 4 stars, writing "Its remit, after all, was to examine the human cost of stopping the boats. On those terms it is not just successful, but awfully and unforgettably effective: vital, evocative and gut-wrenching." Writing in the Age Jake Wilson gives it 3 1/2 stars concluding "But this must be the most thorough exposé yet of the so-called Pacific Solution, which for those it affects most directly is no solution at all." Richard Kuipers of Variety gave it a positive review saying "Orner wisely chooses not to apply fancy frills to the film’s visual presentation. “Asylum” rests squarely, and entirely appropriately, on the strength of its humanist convictions and the power of its stories."

== Awards ==
- 6th AACTA Awards
  - Best Feature Length Documentary - Eva Orner - won
  - Best Direction in a Documentary - Eva Orner - nominated
  - Best Sound in a Documentary - Andy Wright, Diego Ruiz, Mario Vaccaro, Adam Connelly - nominated
