= Bob Simon =

American journalist (1941–2015)

- Simon c. 2013
- Born: Robert David Simon; May 29, 1941; New York City, U.S.
- Died: February 11, 2015 (aged 73); New York City, U.S.
- Occupation: News reporter
- Years active: 1969–2015
- Television: 60 Minutes (1996–2015)
- Spouse: Françoise Anne-Marie (m. 1966)
- Children: 1 daughter Tanya Simon

Robert David Simon (May 29, 1941 – February 11, 2015) was an American television correspondent for CBS News. He covered crises, war, and unrest in 67 countries during his career. Simon reported the withdrawal of American troops from Vietnam, the Israeli–Lebanese Conflict in 1982, and the student protests in China's Tiananmen Square in 1989. During the Persian Gulf War in 1991, he and four of his TV crew were captured and imprisoned by Iraq for 40 days. He published a book about the experience titled Forty Days.

He became a regular correspondent for CBS's 60 Minutes in 1996 and, in 1999, for 60 Minutes II. At the time of his death in an auto crash, he served as 60 Minutes senior foreign correspondent. Simon is described as having been "a giant of broadcast journalism" by CBS News President David Rhodes. He is recognized as one of the few journalists who have covered most of the major overseas conflicts since 1969. For his extensive reporting over a 47-year career, he earned more than 40 major awards, including the Overseas Press Club award and 27 Emmy Awards for journalism.

On February 11, 2015, Simon was critically injured in a car crash in Manhattan, New York. He was transported to St. Luke's–Roosevelt Hospital (now Mount Sinai West), where he died shortly afterwards.

== Early life and education ==
Simon was born to a Jewish family in The Bronx in New York City. In 1962, he graduated Phi Beta Kappa from Brandeis University with a degree in history. From 1964 to 1967, Simon served as an U.S. Foreign Service officer and was a Fulbright Scholar in France and a Woodrow Wilson scholar. From 1969 to 1971, he worked at the CBS News London bureau, and from 1971 to 1977, was based in the London and Saigon bureaus, where he worked as a Vietnam War correspondent. From 1977 to 1981, he was assigned to the CBS News Tel Aviv bureau.

== Career ==
Simon began reporting news in 1969, during The Troubles in Northern Ireland. In Vietnam, he began reporting the war in 1971; for his reports of Hanoi's Easter Offensive, he won an Overseas Press Club award. He won another as part of the team that covered the final six weeks of U.S. involvement, where he boarded one of the last helicopters to leave in 1975. In subsequent years, he reported from war zones in Grenada, Somalia and Haiti. He was in Poland during martial law, with Israeli troops during the Israeli–Lebanese Conflict, and in Egypt following the uprisings in 2011.

From 1981 to 1982, Simon spent time in Washington, D.C., as the CBS News State Department correspondent. From 1982 to 1987, Simon served as a New York-based CBS News national correspondent, and in 1987, was named the CBS News Chief Middle Eastern correspondent.

During the opening days of the Gulf War in January 1991, Simon and his CBS News team were captured by Iraqi forces and spent 40 days in an Iraqi prison, most of it in solitary confinement. Simon later said that it was a "careless mistake" for him and his crew to have crossed the border, and he chronicled the experience in the book Forty Days.

In 1996, Simon joined 60 Minutes as a correspondent, and he was also a correspondent for seven seasons on 60 Minutes II, from January 1999 to June 2005, after which he became a full-time correspondent. His coverage of foreign events were broadcast on all CBS News shows and earned him more than 40 major awards, including the Overseas Press Club's highest honor for a body of work, the President's Award. Simon also received 27 Emmy Awards, believed to be the most earned by a field journalist.

CBS News President David Rhodes described him as "a giant of broadcast journalism." Similarly, former CBS News anchor Dan Rather said Simon was "one of the best writers ever to work in television journalism." He is described by Rather, who worked with him for 38 years, as having been an "old school" journalist, one of the few well-informed "scholar correspondents," and someone who thrived on challenging and dangerous assignments:

He didn't just witness history, he strived to understand it. Yes, he was fearless when bullets were flying, but he also never blinked when staring down a despot or thug in an interview ... He knew when he was being lied to or toyed with, and rather than shirk from the challenge, he would embrace it and become more determined to expose the truth ... There was no issue he couldn't cover, no story he couldn't tell.

His numerous award-winning stories during his 47-year career took him throughout the world: He won his fourth Peabody Award along with an Emmy Award for covering the world's only all-black symphony in Africa, and won his 27th Emmy for broadcasting details about an orchestra in Paraguay that could only afford to make their instruments out of trash. Simon reported from Pakistan after their earthquakes and later from Japan after the 2011 earthquake in Fukushima, which led to a tsunami and nuclear disaster. He has also won Emmy Awards for his reporting from Vietnam (two awards), Lebanon, Cambodia, Saudi Arabia, India, and China.

War zone stories covered by Simon include conflicts in Portugal, Cyprus, the Falkland Islands, the Persian Gulf, Yugoslavia, Grenada, Somalia, and Haiti. After the 1994 Olympic Winter Games in Norway, he earned an Emmy for covering the attempt by Mossad, Israel's secret intelligence agency, to avenge the deaths of Israeli athletes at the Munich Olympics in 1972. And during the 1998 Olympic Winter Games in Nagano, Japan, he delivered a 30-minute report on Louis Zamperini, an American Olympic runner who survived World War II as a Japanese prisoner of war. For the story, Simon received a Sports Emmy.

In 2011, Simon was granted access to Mount Athos and made a two-part 60 Minutes report on the monks.

== Personal life ==
Simon married Françoise Anne-Marie in 1966, whom he met when he studied in France while on a Fulbright scholarship. They had one daughter, Tanya, who later became a producer for 48 Hours and 60 Minutes, with both collaborating on several stories for the latter series.

== Death ==
On February 11, 2015, Simon was discovered unconscious with severe head injuries in a car crash on the West Side Highway of Manhattan, New York. His for-hire driver had lost control, resulting in a collision with another vehicle. Simon was extracted from the roof of the limo by rescue workers and transported to St. Luke's–Roosevelt Hospital, where he died a short time later. The for-hire driver, who survived the crash, had his driver's license suspended nine times between 2011 and Simon's death. Simon's widow Françoise Anne-Marie filed a wrongful death action against Skyline Credit Line Limousine, which was settled in August 2017 for an undisclosed amount.

== Honors and awards ==
Simon won three Peabody Awards and 27 Emmy Awards, including a 2012 Emmy for his report on the world's only all-black symphony orchestra in Central Africa. He would win yet another Emmy Award with his reporting about an orchestra in Paraguay whose poor members constructed instruments from the trash retrieved from a local landfill. He was a four-time recipient of the Overseas Press Club's highest honor for a body of work, the President's Award. He received the Edward Weintal Prize given by Georgetown University's Institute for the Study of Diplomacy in recognition of distinguished reporting on foreign policy and diplomacy. After his story titled "Shame of Srebrenica," a 60 Minutes II report about genocide during the Bosnian War, he was awarded the Alfred I. duPont-Columbia University Award.
