= Surviving Ohio State =

2025 American documentary film

- Release poster
- Directed by: Eva Orner
- Based on: "Why Aren't More People Talking About the Ohio State Sex Abuse Scandal?" by Jon Wertheim
- Produced by: Eva Orner; Joshua Rofé; Steven J. Berger
- Cinematography: Nick Higgins
- Edited by: Charles Olivier
- Production companies: HBO Sports Documentaries; Smokehouse Pictures; 101 Studios; Nerdy Girl
- Distributed by: HBO
- Release dates: June 9, 2025 (Tribeca); June 17, 2025 (United States)
- Running time: 108 minutes
- Country: United States
- Language: English

Surviving Ohio State is a 2025 documentary film, directed and produced by Eva Orner. It follows the Ohio State University abuse scandal. George Clooney serves as a producer under his Smokehouse Pictures banner.

It had its world premiere at the Tribeca Festival on June 9, 2025, and was released on June 17, 2025, by HBO.

== Premise ==
The film explores the Ohio State University abuse scandal. It is based upon the 2020 Sports Illustrated article "Why Aren't More People Talking About the Ohio State Sex Abuse Scandal?" by Jon Wertheim.

== Production ==
In February 2021, it was announced George Clooney and Grant Heslov would produce a documentary series revolving around the Ohio State University abuse scandal. In June 2022, Eva Orner was announced to direct the project, now a feature-length film, with HBO distributing. By October 2023, production had commenced, with the filmmakers uncovering new data.

== Release ==
It had its world premiere at the 2025 Tribeca Festival on June 9, 2025. It was released on June 17, 2025.
