= Ohio State University abuse scandal =

1978–1998 sexual abuse scandal

The Ohio State University abuse scandal centered on allegations of sexual abuse that occurred between 1978 and 1998, while Richard Strauss was employed as a physician by the Ohio State University (OSU) in the Athletics Department and in the Student Health Center. An independent investigation into the allegations was announced in April 2018 and was conducted by the law firm Perkins Coie.

In July 2018, several former wrestlers accused former head coach Russ Hellickson and U.S. representative Jim Jordan, who was an assistant coach at OSU between 1987 and 1994, of knowing about Strauss's alleged abuse but failing to take action to stop it. Jordan has denied that he had any student-athlete report sexual abuse to him.

The report, released in May 2019, concluded that Strauss abused at least 177 male student-patients and that OSU was aware of the abuse as early as 1979, but the abuse was not widely known outside of athletics or student health until 1996, when he was suspended from his duties. Strauss continued to abuse OSU students at an off-campus clinic until his retirement from the university in 1998. OSU was faulted in the report for failing to report Strauss's conduct to law enforcement.

In May 2020, the university entered into a settlement and agreed to pay $40.9 million to 162 sexual abuse survivors. Five lawsuits against the university are pending.

== Background ==
Richard Strauss (1938–2005) received his medical degree from the University of Chicago in 1964, and interned at the associated hospital system until June 1965. Afterward, he served as a lieutenant in the Medical Corps of the United States Navy from 1966 to 1968, and received an honorable discharge. He then took a two-year post-doctoral fellowship at the School of Medicine at the University of Washington until 1970, and then worked as an assistant professor of physiology at both the University of Pennsylvania (1970–1972) and the University of Hawaiʻi (1972–74). After Hawaii, Strauss worked as a medical resident at Rutgers University (1974–1975) and as a research fellow at Harvard Medical School (1975–1978). Hawaii found no records of any complaints filed against Strauss during his time there.

Strauss was hired as an assistant professor in the OSU College of Medicine in September 1978; shortly afterward, he began volunteering as a team physician at Larkins Hall, OSU's physical education building. He was appointed to a position in the athletics department in 1981, and to student health in 1994. In athletics, Strauss served as a team physician for multiple teams, including men's wrestling, gymnastics, fencing, lacrosse, and swimming and diving; he additionally treated students on the hockey, cheerleading, volleyball, soccer, track, golf, baseball, tennis, water polo, and football teams. Strauss was not formally appointed to a position at Student Health until 1994, but was known to have started performing treatments there as early as 1978.

Is this injury bad enough that I'm going to get molested for it?

— Nick Nutter, former OSU wrestler, quoted in the Associated Press, July 6, 2018

By 1979, athletics department officials knew that Strauss conducted unusually prolonged genital examinations on male athletes, and that athletics staff were not permitted to be present during these examinations. In addition, Strauss was known to shower alongside male students at Larkins Hall, a behavior which was unique to Strauss among team physicians. Between 1979 and 1996, multiple students complained about Strauss's excessive and unnecessary genital examinations, but no action was taken by OSU until January 1996, when he was placed on administrative leave in response to patient complaints.

Larkins Hall, which served OSU as its physical education facility and natatorium, was perceived as a sexualized environment, and multiple witnesses reported that voyeurism and public sex acts occurred there from the early 1980s to the late 1990s. Thirty wrestlers and gymnasts reported voyeurs were routinely present at Larkins Hall in the locker room, shower, and sauna areas, ranging from college age to approximately 60 years old; the "leering" voyeurs would ogle student-athletes that were using the facilities and some would masturbate. Sources familiar with then-head coach Russ Hellickson's actions at the time said that the situation was so egregious that Hellickson would occasionally have to drag the voyeurs out of the building, and that he also pleaded with the university to move their athletes to a private facility. Strauss was counted among the voyeurs; former OSU students stated that Strauss would shower among athletes multiple times per day or stare into the shower while seated on a stool. In addition, peepholes were found in bathroom stalls and shower walls. The building was completed in 1932, named for retired OSU Athletic Director Dick Larkins in 1976, expanded in 1977, and demolished in 2005.

After a closed-door hearing on June 5, 1996, Strauss was terminated from his position with the Athletics Department at the end of July 1996, and terminated from Student Health on August 5, 1996. However, Strauss opened a private off-campus clinic and continued to abuse male patients there. Former employees of the off-campus Men's Clinics of America recalled Strauss placing advertisements in the student newspaper promising student discounts and prompt treatment of genital issues. He also continued as a tenured faculty member in the School of Public Health until his voluntary retirement on March 1, 1998, upon which he gained emeritus status.

Strauss died by suicide in August 2005. According to his suicide note, he had been suffering from "significant escalating medical and pain problems since January 2002".

In 2019, OSU published its annual campus safety report, which reflected that Strauss committed 1,430 instances of fondling and 47 rapes during his tenure.

== Investigation ==
Mike DiSabato was one of the first to report that Strauss had groped him during medical exams. He first requested information about Strauss in January 2018 via a letter to the university; after failing to get a timely response, he approached The Columbus Dispatch with the allegations of abuse in April. DiSabato, who wrestled at Ohio State from 1987 to 1991, added that his first examination with Strauss occurred at the age of 14, when Strauss was conducting research on the body fat of high school wrestlers; the body fat testing included an unnecessary genital exam. At the time, DiSabato did not recognize Strauss's behavior as sexual abuse and that it was considered an "open secret" amongst the wrestling team.

In response, the Ohio State University announced that an investigation had been launched into the long-term sexual abuse in April 2018, asking former students and coaches to come forward with any information that might help the investigation. At the time, the independent investigation was being led by Bricker & Eckler. After the Ohio Attorney General's office appointed Porter Wright Morris & Arthur as the university's legal counsel, Porter Wright commissioned Perkins Coie to lead the independent investigation. OSU President Michael Drake sent an email in May 2018 to more than 100,000 alumni asking them to contact Perkins Coie with any allegations of abuse. Based on the evidence uncovered, in June 2018 Perkins Coie expanded the scope of the investigation to include Strauss's examinations of high school students.

The investigation was estimated to have cost $6.2 million by the time the report was released in May 2019.

Strauss's son, Scott Strauss, released a statement in July 2018 expressing that the Strauss family was "shocked and saddened" by the allegations against Richard Strauss.

The Office for Civil Rights (OCR) of the United States Department of Education announced it had opened a separate investigation into the university's response in August 2018. Several advocacy groups had sent a letter to OCR earlier in August, alleging that OSU's actions violated Title IX regulations.

The Ohio State Medical Board confirmed that it had received complaints about Strauss and had turned over confidential records to OSU lawyers in December 2018. However, because the records were confidential, the investigators were not allowed to access them. The board had investigated Strauss in 1996 but never disciplined him. Details of the investigation were made public in the report by Perkins Coie; specific identifying details were redacted. In May 2019, after the redacted report was released, the State Medical Board voted to release the records of its 1996 investigation if the alleged victims agreed to waive their confidentiality. Ohio Governor Mike DeWine created a review group via executive order in May 2019. The group's charter was to review the actions that were taken by the State Medical Board in response to the complaints about Strauss.

The investigators conducted interviews with 177 students who provided evidence that Strauss had committed sexual abuse; although not all of the students felt his behavior was abusive, consultation with independent medical doctors confirmed they were not appropriate patient–doctor interactions. The majority of abuse (143 victims) was categorized as genital fondling associated with medically unnecessary genital or rectal examinations. Of the 177, 153 were student-athletes, of which a plurality (48) were members of the men's wrestling team.

== Civil lawsuits and subsequent developments ==
=== Lawsuits ===
Several civil lawsuits have been filed against the Ohio State University in conjunction with the abuse committed by Strauss. Three federal lawsuits had been filed by July 2018; the third lawsuit named several OSU administrators including ex-Athletic Director Andy Geiger as having knowledge of Strauss's abuse. By September 2018, the university had filed motions to dismiss the first three lawsuits based on associated statutes of limitations. Two of the suits were merged in October 2018. In total, more than 20 school officials and staff were named as knowing of complaints about Strauss's abuse but failing to stop him.

In June 2020, Ohio State University agreed to pay $40.9 million to settle the lawsuits of 162 men who alleged sexual abuse during Strauss's tenure.

In September 2021, a judge dismissed several cases brought against the university on grounds that the statute of limitations had passed. A federal appeals court ruled in September 2022 that the lawsuits could move forward, stating the judge had "erred" in his ruling. In June 2023, the Supreme Court rejected the university's appeal of the September 2022 ruling, allowing the lawsuits to proceed.

As of October 2023, five lawsuits against the university from 236 men were pending. The university denied admitting to any wrongdoing in its handling of Strauss's abuses.

On June 3, 2026, Ohio State University agreed to pay approximately $100 million to settle legal claims from hundreds of former student athletes who said they were sexually abused decades ago by Dr. Strauss at the university.

=== Jim Jordan's involvement ===
In June 2018, at least eight former wrestlers reported that then-coaches Russ Hellickson (head coach, 1986–2006) and Jim Jordan (assistant coach, 1987–1995) were aware of the abuse by Strauss but failed to put a stop to it. Jordan's locker was adjacent to Strauss's, and while he was assistant wrestling coach, he created and awarded a "King of the Sauna" certificate to the member of the team who spent the most time in the sauna "talking smack".

Former wrestling team members David Range, Mike DiSabato, and Dunyasha Yetts asserted that Jordan knew of Strauss's misconduct. Yetts said, "For God's sake, Strauss's locker was right next to Jordan's and Jordan even said he'd kill him if he tried anything with him". No wrestlers have accused Jordan of sexual misconduct, but four former wrestlers named him as a defendant in a lawsuit against the university. Several former wrestlers, including ex-UFC fighter Mark Coleman, allege that Hellickson contacted two witnesses in an alleged attempt to pressure them to support Jordan the day after they accused Jordan of turning a blind eye to the abuse.

Jordan denied that any student-athlete had reported any abuse to him. Jordan said the timings of the allegations that he knew of the abuse were "interesting ... in light of things that are going on in Washington", referring to Jordan's role as a founder of the Freedom Caucus and his potential candidacy for Speaker of the House. Speaker Paul Ryan defended Jordan as "a man of honesty, a man of integrity" and discouraged an investigation by the House Ethics Committee, as the abuse had occurred before Jordan's election to the House of Representatives. Other ex-wrestlers defended Jordan, who was interviewed by Perkins Coie later in July.

In response to Jordan's denials, DiSabato said, "I considered Jim Jordan a friend. But at the end of the day, he is absolutely lying if he says he doesn't know what was going on."

On July 13, 2018, the editorial board of the Cleveland Plain Dealer wrote, "Jim Jordan must acknowledge what he knew".

In May 2019, DiSabato filed a Title IX lawsuit against OSU. In one count of the court papers, DiSabato alleged that a second cousin of Jordan's had attempted to "intimidate and retaliate" against him. In 2019, DiSabato shared text messages with NBC News that were corroborated by another former wrestler indicating that Jim Jordan, Russ Hellickson, and high school wrestling coach Jeff Jordan (Jim Jordan's younger brother) conspired to engage in witness tampering and intimidation when they called former OSU wrestler Mark Coleman and his parents to pressure him to recant his earlier accusation that Jordan was aware of the abuse. Coleman had shared a room with Jordan while traveling to several wrestling meets.

In November 2019, a retired wrestling referee filed a lawsuit alleging that he had warned Jordan and Hellickson about Strauss's misconduct but they had dismissed his warning. Jordan dismissed the referee as "another person making a false statement".

In February 2020, Adam DiSabato – the brother of Mike DiSabato – testified under oath that Jordan telephoned him "crying, groveling...begging me to go against my brother.... That's the kind of cover-up that's going on there", described Jordan as a "coward" and accused Hellickson of "abandon[ing]" the wrestlers who came forward with allegations about Strauss.

In March 2020, six former OSU wrestlers told CNN that Jordan was aware of sexual misconduct accusations against Strauss. Eight others said Strauss's behavior was an open secret in the OSU athletic department and that Jordan had to have known about it.

In October 2023, the former OSU wrestlers who accused Jordan of ignoring the scandal opposed his bid for Speaker of the House.

=== Documentary ===
In February 2021, The Hollywood Reporter reported that George Clooney's film production company Smokehouse Pictures would be teaming with Sports Illustrated Studios and 101 Studios to produce a docuseries about the scandal, and that the series would be based on an October 2020 Sports Illustrated article by Jon Wertheim detailing Strauss's abuse.

HBO announced in June 2022 that the documentary had started production, with a planned debut on HBO and HBO MAX. Australian director Eva Orner is directing the documentary. The filmmakers have interviewed several abuse survivors. A staffer at Smokehouse Pictures said in October 2023 that they were "still thick in production on it".

On April 16, 2025, it was announced that the film, titled Surviving Ohio State, would have its world premiere at the 2025 Tribeca Film Festival in addition to airing on HBO.
