= Jensen Farley Pictures =

Defunct American film distribution company

- Company type: Entertainment
- Industry: Film distribution and production
- Founded: 1980; 46 years ago
- Founder: Rayland Jensen; Clair Farley
- Defunct: December 30, 1983; 42 years ago
- Fate: Bankruptcy
- Headquarters: Salt Lake City, Utah, U.S.

Jensen Farley Pictures was an American independent film distribution company based in Utah that released several films between 1980 and 1983, founded by Rayland Jensen and Clair Farley, former heads of Sunn Classic Pictures. The company filed for Chapter 11 bankruptcy on December 30, 1983, and ceased distribution.

== Films distributed ==
- Agency (1980)
- The Gods Must Be Crazy (1980)
- The President Must Die (1981)
- Private Lessons (1981)
- The Boogens (1981)
- Madman (1981)
- If You Could See What I Hear (1982)
- Baker County, U.S.A. (1982)
- Homework (1982)
- Wacko (1982)
- The Last Unicorn (1982)
- Timerider: The Adventure of Lyle Swann (1982)
- The Vals (1983)
- Joysticks (1983)
- Curtains (1983)
- Triumphs of a Man Called Horse (1983)
- Chained Heat (1983)
- Off the Wall (1983)
- The Return of Captain Invincible (1983)

== See also ==
- Sunn Classic Pictures
