= Beijing Spring (film) =

2020 documentary film

- Official release poster
- Directed by: Andy Cohen; Gaylen Ross
- Written by: Andy Cohen; Gaylen Ross
- Produced by: Andy Cohen; Gaylen Ross; Constance Le Marié
- Edited by: Andrew Ford
- Music by: Matt Clifford; Damian Lazarus; Zhou Yunpeng
- Production company: AC Films
- Release date: March 2021 (FIFDH)
- Running time: 100 minutes
- Country: United States
- Languages: English; Mandarin

Beijing Spring is a 2021 American documentary film directed by Andy Cohen and co-directed by Gaylen Ross. The film chronicles the struggle for free speech and free artistic expression in the People's Republic of China (PRC) during a brief period of political reform during the late 1970s known as the Beijing Spring. Production started in 2010 and finished in 2020. Due to legal and jurisdictional issues surrounding the rights of Chi Xiaoning's never-before-seen archival footage, production was halted for four years until Hong Kong's M+ Museum untangled complicated ownership rights.

== Background ==
The Beijing Spring began with Mao Zedong's death in September 1976 and peaked with Deng Xiaoping's liberalization efforts in 1978–1979. Along with economic reforms, Deng loosened censorship, allowing western books and ideas into China, and experimented with free speech, allowing citizens to express their thoughts freely in one easily monitored locale: the Democracy Wall, a long brick wall running along Xidan Street near Tiananmen Square. Farmers and workers posted big character posters (dazibao) on the Democracy Wall, expressing grievances suffered during the Cultural Revolution (1966 – 1976) and demanding reparations for deaths, torture and arbitrary imprisonment of family members. Artists and essayists also began to post unofficial art works and writings on the wall from underground magazines that bucked official propaganda, criticized the Chinese Communist Party (CCP) and called for democracy.

The film focuses on a group of artists called the Stars, which grew out of the underground magazine Today. At Democracy Wall, the artists pushed the limits of free speech by posting prohibited art forms such as abstraction and nudity, photos and poetry depicting everyday life, as well as sculpture critical of the CCP. Meanwhile, overt calls for democracy were penned and posted by activists Wei Jingsheng of Explorations magazine and Xu Wenli of the April Fifth Forum.

After being refused the right to officially exhibit their avant-garde work in a gallery, the Stars held an illegal exhibition on the fence outside the National Museum of China. It was immediately taken down by the police and the works confiscated. Continuing the struggle for free artistic expression, the Stars and democracy activists held a protest rally at Democracy Wall on National Day, the annual October 1 celebration of the founding of the PRC. After the speeches, the gathered crowd marched to the Municipal Building with thousands of ordinary people joining along the way. The artists and activists feared long prison sentences or death.

Provoked and incensed, Deng cracked down on the Democracy Wall movement and Stars art group in 1980, closing the wall and issuing arrests, putting an end to the Beijing Spring. The government-sponsored Anti-Spiritual Pollution campaign that followed sought to curtail Western-inspired liberal ideas from "polluting" China's youth and culture. The Democracy Wall activists and artists were targeted by the authorities and were subsequently forced into exile abroad.

=== Use of archival footage hidden from authorities ===
For the first time ever, Beijing Spring shows 16 mm footage of the illegal 1979 Stars art exhibit hung on the iron fence of the National Museum, as well as modern China's first protest rally and march through the city streets. After being detained by the authorities for illegally filming the illegal protest, Chi Xiaoning tricked the authorities into believing he destroyed the footage by exposing a blank reel of film. Chi hid the actual footage with friends, which was passed around and hidden underground in Beijing for four decades until Cohen tracked it down with the help of his Mandarin-speaking cousin.

== Key themes ==
=== Free speech ===
Beijing Spring is the story of the struggle for freedom of expression. Dozens of art pieces created by the unofficial Stars artists are presented in the film, paying tribute to the courage of the artists/activists of the time who dared break with the restrictive aesthetic mandates laid down by Maoist policy.

=== Censorship ===
The film focuses on the Democracy Wall activists' and Stars artists' fight against censorship after Mao's death in 1976. Censorship in mainland China, and now in Hong Kong, was and continues to be a formidable foe of free speech in the realm of art, writing and democracy movements. The trial of Wei Jingsheng was closed, yet the artists managed to secretly record the hearing and post the transcript on Democracy Wall. The Stars also pushed for the right to peacefully gather and protest.

=== Women's rights ===
Themes of women's rights are explored through the art and eyes of activists and artists. Stars artist Li Shuang spent two years in jail for dating a foreigner, French diplomat Emmanuel Bellefroid, to whom she was eventually married in Paris after her release with the help of the French government.

== Cast ==
The story is told through archival images and audio recordings, art works and recent testimonies from participants of the Stars including Ai Weiwei, Ma Desheng, Huang Rui, Wang Keping, Qu Leilei, Li Shuang and Shao Fei among others. Democracy activists Wei Jingsheng and Xu Wenli also appear in the film, who between the two of them spent more than 35 years in jail, often in solitary confinement.

== Reception ==
The reviews were positive, valuing the film's dramatic storyline and intricate weave of archival footage, photos, art, poetry, music, dance, underground magazines as well as testimony from the Democracy Wall artists and activists who battled totalitarianism. Beijing Spring brings to light a story that had been censored from China's official history books.

Le Culte's Marius Gellner writes, "This feature film by Andy Cohen and Gaylen Ross holds us spellbound, educates us and amazes us by mixing archival footage and testimonies of the artists who raised their voices against censorship in the late 1970s."

And according to Guylaine Massoutre of Spirale Magazine,

"Watching Beijing Spring, the documentary that opens the 39th edition of FIFA in Montreal, one knows the bar has been set high."

In the Jerusalem Post, Hannah Brown wrote that the Democracy Wall movement "is the subject of a fascinating documentary, Beijing Spring."

"Beijing Spring is an essential document," Art Asia Pacific states, "that chronicles several key events in the transformative history of 20th-century China."

== Awards ==
- Jury Prize FIFA/Amnesty International, Montreal—2021
- Dart Best International Documentary Award, Barcelona—2021
- Lonely Wolf Best Feature Documentary Award, London—2021
- Lonely Wolf Outstanding Achievement in Documentary Editing, Archival Usage & Assembly Award, London—2021
- Austin International Art Festival Best Feature Documentary, Austin—2021

== Press ==
- "Two documentaries distill the struggle of political dissent in China decades apart". Los Angeles Times.
- "'Beijing Spring' Review: The Politics of Aesthetics". The New York Times.
- "Beijing Spring: Documenting the Thaw After the Cultural Revolution". jbspins.com.
- "BEIJING SPRING". hammertonail.com.
- 专访《北京之春》导演：民主墙、星星美展、首曝光的现场镜头. Radio Free Asia.
- "Heroic artists shine in 'Beijing Spring' at Epos Art Film Festival". The Jerusalem Post.
- "Beijing Spring : la naissance de l'art dans la censure". leculte.ca. Archived from the original on 2021-06-04.
- "Le Printemps de Pékin". spiralemagazine.com.
- "Le film secret du "printemps de Pékin"". letemps.ch.
- ""Beijing Spring": Andy Cohen et Gaylen Ross racontent une Chine sans censure". ledevoir.com.
- "The Story of Chi Xiaoning and His Smuggled Camera". mplus.org.
- ""Beijing Spring", témoignage inédit d'une expérience démocratique". heidi.news.
