= Junk (2024 film) =

- Release poster
- Directed by: Jack Begert
- Written by: Dani Goffstein; Jack Begert
- Produced by: Darren Aronofsky; Andy Cohen; Dylan Golden; Brendan Naylor; Sam Canter; Noor Alfallah
- Starring: David Schwimmer; Gaby Hoffmann; Dominic Fike; Talia Ryder; Jena Malone; Sante Bentivoglio
- Cinematography: Christopher Ripley
- Edited by: Jake Torchin
- Production companies: AC Films; Protozoa Pictures; Psycho Films
- Distributed by: Mubi
- Release dates: January 19, 2024 (Sundance); October 23, 2026 (United States)
- Running time: 99 minutes
- Country: United States
- Language: English

Junk is a 2024 American comedy-drama film directed by Jack Begert in his directorial debut, co-written with Dani Goffstein. It stars David Schwimmer, Gaby Hoffmann, Karl Glusman, Dominic Fike, Talia Ryder, Jena Malone and Sante Bentivoglio. Darren Aronofsky serves as a producer under his Protozoa Pictures banner.

The film premiered under the title Little Death at the 2024 Sundance Film Festival on January 19, and won the NEXT Innovator Award. It was released on Mubi on October 23, 2026.

== Premise ==
The life of a bitter and misanthropic TV writer intersects with the story of two addicts on an odyssey trying to find a stolen backpack.

== Cast ==
- David Schwimmer as Martin Solomon
- Gaby Hoffmann as Martin 2.0
- Dominic Fike as AJ
- Talia Ryder as Karla
- Jena Malone as Jessica
- Sante Bentivoglio as Greg
- Karl Glusman as Grady
- Chase Sui Wonders as Tilly
- Angela Sarafyan as Record Store Woman
- Travis Bennett as Brian
- Fred Melamed as Augustus
- Seth Green as David
- Ben Feldman as Jayson
- Lauren Weedman as Lynette
- Maya Kazan as Stella

== Production ==
In July 2022, it was announced David Schwimmer, Dominic Fike and Talia Ryder had joined the cast of the film, with Jack Begert making his directorial debut from a screenplay he wrote alongside Dani Goffstein, and Darren Aronofsky set to produce under his Protozoa Pictures banner, alongside Sam Canter of Psycho Films and Andy Cohen of AC Films, his first venture into narrative film from documentary. Cinematographer Christopher Ripley shot it in 35mm film.

Initially titled Little Death, it was later retitled Junk.

== Release ==
The film premiered in the Next section at the 2024 Sundance Film Festival on January 19, 2024, and was released on Mubi on October 23, 2026.
