= Ximei =

- Directed by: Andy Cohen, Gaylen Ross
- Written by: Andy Cohen
- Produced by: Chin-chin Yap, Ai Weiwei
- Starring: Liu Ximei
- Edited by: Ying Lu
- Production company: AC Films
- Release date: 2019
- Languages: English, Mandarin

Ximei is a 2019 American documentary directed by Andy Cohen, co-directed by Gaylen Ross and produced by Ai Weiwei. In a gritty, vérité style, the film follows the harrowing crusades of a peasant woman named Liu Ximei. She fights for the survival of fellow AIDS victims who contracted AIDS in the 1990s when Chinese health officials encouraged millions of poor farmers to sell their blood for a pittance under catastrophic health conditions.

Production of Ximei lasted seven years, due to interference from Chinese officials; Cohen's phone and internet messages were spied on, parts of the footage regularly confiscated, and he and Ross were expelled from the AIDS villages on various occasions. Subjects of the film were often detained by the authorities and forced to sign statements and the film's Chinese cameraman was arrested and later released for his activism.

== Reception ==
The LA Times’ Kimber Myers observed, "No wonder China was so concerned about the production of Ximei…But this isn’t simply a damning indictment of the nation; it is a hopeful celebration of one woman’s activism and kindness in the face of her own struggle with AIDS."

In the opinion of Ben Kenigsberg of the NY Times, "It does pay its subjects the ultimate courtesy, treating them as officials have not: as fully rounded human beings."

Joe Bendel wrote, "Cohen & Ross’s Ximei (executive produced by Ai Weiwei) is very highly recommended as a profile in courage and an indictment of the CCP’s callous contempt for human life."

In Spiritual Practice Micah Bucey states, "Ximei, directed with a combination of in-the-moment grit and great sensitivity by Andrew Cohen and Gaylen Ross, follows this no-nonsense justice warrior through her often mundane days."

== Awards ==
- Close Up Edinburgh Docufest – Best social impact Doc
- Movies that Matters – Golden Butterfly Award
- The Telly Awards – Silver Telly Award
- Golden Gate International Film Festival – Film of the Festival
- Golden Gate International Film Festival – Best Cinematography
