= Noor Alfallah =

Kuwaiti American film producer

Noor Alfallah (born December 2, 1993) is a Kuwaiti-American film producer. Alfallah first came to public attention through her relationship with English rock singer Mick Jagger of the Rolling Stones.

== Early life ==
Alfallah is the daughter of a Kuwaiti businessman and an American mother. She grew up in Los Angeles County in the city of Beverly Hills and studied at the University of Southern California's Cinematic School of Arts and the UCLA School of Film and Television.

== Career ==
Alfallah works in the media industry and is a producer and executive producer for several film and television productions. She was co-producer, along with five other people, of the film Little Death, starring David Schwimmer, which was presented at the Sundance Film Festival 2024. In 2024, she produced the drama Billy Knight together with six other executive producers, with her ex-partner Al Pacino in the lead role. She is also the producer of Dead Man's Wire, Gus Van Sant's latest film.

== Personal life ==
Alfallah first came to public attention in 2017 through a reported relationship with musician Mick Jagger. Following their split, she told Hello! that their age difference “didn’t matter” to her, describing it as her “first serious relationship” and “a happy time”. In the years that followed, Alfallah continued to attract considerable media attention due to her relationships with significantly older men. In 2018, she was in a relationship with 61-year-old billionaire Nicolas Berggruen. She denied media reports of a relationship with American actor Clint Eastwood, calling the actor a "family friend".

In 2022, Alfallah began a relationship with 82-year-old film actor Al Pacino and the couple had a son, Roman, in 2023. Alfallah and Pacino ended their relationship in October 2024 but share custody of their son, with Alfallah still considering Pacino her "best friend".

== Filmography ==
=== As producer ===
- Brosa Nostra (2018)
- La Petite Mort (2019)
- Little Death (2024)
- Los Frikis (2024)
- Marion (2024)
- American Sweatshop (2025)
- Billy Knight (2025)
- Dead Man's Wire (2025)

== See also ==
- Age disparity in sexual relationships
