= Carmen Herrera =

Cuban-American painter and visual artist (1915–2022)

- Carmen Herrera by Alina Roque
- Born: May 31, 1915; Havana, Cuba
- Died: February 12, 2022 (aged 106); New York City, U.S.
- Known for: Painting
- Style: Minimalism
- Movement: Abstract Expressionism

Carmen Herrera (May 31, 1915 – February 12, 2022) was a Cuban-born American abstract, minimalist visual artist and painter. She was born in Havana and lived in New York City from the mid-1950s. Herrera's abstract works brought her international recognition late in life.

== Early life ==
Herrera was born on May 31, 1915, in Havana, Cuba. She was one of seven siblings. Her parents, Antonio Herrera y López de la Torre (1874–1917) and Carmela Nieto de Herrera (1875–1963), were part of Havana's intellectual circle. Antonio had served as a captain in the Cuban army during the Cuban War of Independence. After the war, he became executive editor of Cuba's first post-independence newspaper, El Mundo, founded in 1901. Carmela was a pioneering journalist and respected author, philanthropist, and feminist. Herrera began taking private art lessons from professor Federico Edelmann y Pinto when she was eight years old. Herrera attributed these lessons to her facility for discipline and for providing her with the fundamentals of academic drawing. She furthered her training in 1929, at the age of 14, when she attended the Marymount International School in Paris. In 1938, Herrera continued her education at the Universidad de la Habana to study architecture, where she stayed for only one academic year because in the time she wanted to pursue her architectural career there was as she related ..."always revolutions going on, and fighting in the street. The university was closed most of the time, so it affected my studies." This year had a strong impact on Herrera and she is quoted as having said, "There, an extraordinary world opened up to me that never closed: the world of straight lines, which has interested me until this very day."

== Middle years: (1939–early 1960s) ==
In 1939, Herrera married English teacher Jesse Loewenthal (1902–2000), whom she had met in 1937 when he was visiting Cuba from New York. She moved to New York to be with him and they lived in his apartment on East Nineteenth Street. From 1943 to 1947, she studied at the Art Students League in New York City, where she had received a scholarship. Here, she studied painting with Jon Corbino (1905–1964). She left the Art Students League in 1943 when she felt that she had learned all that she could from Corbino. She then began taking printmaking classes at the Brooklyn Museum, but left there after a year. In New York, Herrera struggled to be included in museum exhibitions, and felt that Havana would have provided her with more opportunities than she was offered in the United States.

In 1948, Herrera and Loewenthal moved to Paris, where they stayed for nearly five years. At the time, the city was a meeting place for various artistic styles and movements, including influences from the Bauhaus and Russian Suprematism. Herrera encountered various international artists such as Theo van Doesburg in Paris at the Salon des Réalités Nouvelles. During these Paris years she also become associated with the French intellectuals and philosophers Simone de Beauvoir and Jean-Paul Sartre.

Herrera began to refine her hard edge, non-objective style during this time period, although, as Whitney Curator Dana Miller comments, her work still contained "a lot of vibrancy and life," as well as an "almost spiritual quality." Her style at the time has been retrospectively compared to the work of Ellsworth Kelly, who was also working in Paris during these years, but who received far more publicity.

In 1950, Herrera made a return trip to Cuba where she painted a series of highly gestural abstract paintings. The works produced on this trip were reflective of contemporary developments in abstraction and have a style and color palette that is not seen again in Herrera's works. She exhibited these works in a solo show in December 1950 in Havana at the Lyceum, but the audience was not receptive.

After her return to Paris, financial difficulties and her husband's inability to secure a job forced the couple to move back to New York in 1953. At the time of her return to New York, Herrera and others continued to develop a rational style. At this time she began to experiment with "the physical structure of the painting...paintings becoming an object." In this period, she also grew close to other postwar abstractionists, including Leon Polk Smith, Mark Rothko, and Barnett Newman.

Herrera continued to face rejection from the art world during her time in New York, largely due to her gender. Herrera herself commented that "the fact that you were a woman was against you." When attempting to enter her art for an exhibition at the Rose Fried gallery, the female curator, Rose Fried, told her she could not include the work because Herrera was a woman.

Herrera continued creating without recognition until her late-life discovery, beginning in the early 2000s.

== Style and progression ==
Untitled Estructura (Yellow) (1966/2016) at the National Gallery of Art in 2022

The key to understanding Herrera's style is remembering that, before she left Cuba, she was trained as an architect. According to Herrera, her optical and minimalist approach to form illustrated her "quest ... for the simplest of pictorial resolutions."

"This foundation can be seen in her urge to use measurements and tools to create orderly art in a chaotic world. In an article for the New York Times critic Ted Loos succinctly captured the essence of Carmen Herrera's work, as characterized by "signature bold simplicity: sharply delineated blocks of color often energized by a strong diagonal line." In her own words, Herrera thought about "the line, the paper, about a lot of tiny things that get bigger and bigger... and then a picture comes up." She was also a self-professed believer in the adage that "less is more" and painted with her brain rather than her heart. This drove her to consider not only whether she liked a color, but also what it did to the other colors involved and whether she could reduce an aspect of her work to improve it.

== Creative process ==
Herrera's creative process was relatively straightforward and orderly, as one might expect given her professional training. Step one, she sketched with a pencil and graph paper while sitting beside a long bank of windows looking out over E 19th St. This process began by 9:30 every morning. Step 2, she "transfers the idea to a small piece of vellum, and, using acrylic paint marker, does the sketch in color." Then came a larger iteration of the work to make sure her initial concept still translated. If it met her approval, she proceeded to have her assistant, Manuel Belduma, map out the lines with tape on canvas under her exacting gaze. Then the painting process could begin. Typically, she would put on the first coat and Belduma applied subsequent layers. Once completed, the art was placed around the studio for her consideration, and even then she would sometimes scrap it and go back to the drawing board in pursuit of simplicity. In addition to providing a capable set of hands, Belduma was also responsible for gathering materials and helping her with day-to-day studio operations. He was an often-overlooked contributing factor to Herrera's artistic process.

== Work ==
Equilibrium (2012) at the Metropolitan Museum of Art in 2022

While some of her work has drawn comparisons to Brazilian neo-concretists Lygia Clark and Hélio Oiticica, according to the New York critic Karen Rosenberg, Herrera's style is defined by her "signature geometric abstractions." She presented "pared-down paintings of just two colors [that contain] seemingly infinite spatial complications." These sensibilities were initially developed during her six years stint in post WWII Paris, where she encountered the ideas of artists like Kazimir Malevich, Piet Mondrian, and other devotees of Suprematism and De Stijl. She is not only significant for her contributions to geometric abstraction; many of her works are also complex representations of the natural world. For example, her seminal twelve-year series Blanco y Verde (1959) is a deconstruction of traditional landscape painting. First, she utilized horizontal lines to create a sense of horizon. This sense is then heightened by her signature diagonal line, which combines to create the traditional focal point that is a hallmark of many landscapes. The deliberate contrast of white on green also captures the essence of many landscape color-schemes in a very abstract sense.

Another notable facet of Herrera's early development was her experimentation with canvas shape. Sara Rich, a Pennsylvania State University professor specializing in the connection between American Abstraction and the visual culture of the Cold War, explains that Herrera's earliest works focused primarily on orienting the canvas appropriately to reflect its shape. In the beginning, Rich contends, Herrera was essentially concerned with reminding audiences that, for example, a circular canvas, in the real world, "wanted to roll." She mainly tried to achieve this by employing arrows and other similarly shaped directional devices. This exploration led her to consider triangles and the motion indicated by painted marks continuing off of the canvas and around its edge. Herrera is notable for consistently having manipulated the effect that triangles often have in paintings, which is providing context and perspective that takes away from a works abstraction. Sara Rich also notes that Barnett Newman was also an early friend and extremely formative influence on the young Herrera's works after she left Cuba in 1939.

== Late-life discovery ==
Herrera was not broadly recognized or appreciated for decades, though she sold her first piece of art at age 19. Prior to her recent shows at the Lisson Gallery and Whitney Museum, she had only one major show in 1984 at the now defunct Alternative Museum in New York. As Karen Rosenberg noted, Herrera's first solo art exhibition came over fifty years after she first moved to New York, where she has been since 1954. This is primarily a result of dominant attitudes towards women in art and Cubans in America, which both constitute hurdles she has overcome throughout her career. All of this finally changed for Herrera in 2004. Her close friend and advocate, the painter Tony Bechara, attended a dinner with Frederico Sève, the owner of the Latin Collector Gallery in Manhattan. Sève was in the process of developing a much-publicized show featuring female geometric painters, from which an artist had dropped out.[5] Bechara recommended Herrera.[5] When Sève saw her paintings, he at first thought they were done by Lygia Clark, but he subsequently found out that Herrera's paintings had been done a decade before Clark's.[5]

Despite living in the United States for much of her life, publications writing about her recent rediscovery have often labeled her as a Cuban-American artist. Although proud of her heritage, Herrera has consciously avoided relating her work to a particular national or ethnic aesthetic. Even in times of Cuban turmoil, such as during the Cuban Revolution of the late 1950s, she consciously avoided a politicization of her work.

Carmen Ramos, a curator of Latino Art at the Smithsonian, noted that "Unlike many European émigré artists to the U.S., Herrera, who has lived in the United States since her early twenties, has rarely been identified as an American artist. Her recent success appears predicated on her Latin American status and ultimately obscures her visibility as a U.S.-based artist."

In 2019 Herrera was elected to the Royal Academy of Arts in London, as an Honorary Royal Academician (HonRA).

== Permanent collections ==
Herrera's work can be found in collections of major institutions around the world, such as the National Gallery of Art, Washington; the Tate Modern, London; the Museum of Modern Art, New York; and the Pérez Art Museum Miami, among many others.

Among Herrera's last works was a mural for the exterior of the Blanton Museum of Art in Austin, Texas. Verde, que te quiero verde [Green, How I Desire You Green] (a title inspired by the refrain of Federico García Lorca’s poem Romance Sonámbulo) was begun in 2020 and posthumously opened to the public in 2023. It was the artist's first major public mural commission. "I worked mainly in solitude for many years," said Herrera, "The opportunity to do something in such a grand scale and in a site of such importance was very appealing." She called the work "a high point in my long career."

== Exhibitions ==
Herrera exhibited several times at the Salon des Réalités Nouvelles beginning in 1949. Solo exhibitions were hosted at the Galeria Sudamericana (1956), Trabia Gallery (1963), Cisneros Gallery (1965) and Alternative Gallery (1986). El Museo del Barrio in East Harlem, New York, mounted Carmen Herrera: The Black and White Paintings, 1951–1989, an exhibition of Herrera's work in 1998. Latincollector held Carmen Herrera: Five Decades of Painting, a large retrospective in 2005. Latincollector presented Estructuras, the first exhibition of several of her wooden structures in 2007. A retrospective exhibition opened in July 2009 at the nonprofit IKON Gallery in Birmingham, England, and travelled to the Pfalzgalerie Museum in Kaiserslautern, Germany in 2010.

In 2016, she also had exhibitions at the Whitney Museum of Art and at the Lisson Gallery, and in 2019, her work was included in the group show The Gift of Art, at Pérez Art Museum Miami. The exhibition highlighted important artworks within PAMM's permanent collection on Latinx and Latin American artists. Among the artists featured in the exhibition were José Bedia (Cuba), Teresa Margolles (Mexico), Roberto Matta (Chile), Oscar Murillo (Colombia), Amelia Peláez (Cuba), Zilia Sánchez (Cuba), Tunga (Brazil) and Wifredo Lam (Cuba).

In 2020 she had a solo exhibition at The Museum of Fine Arts Houston. Herrera has also had a breakthrough with her exhibition at the Museum of Modern Art.

Herrera's work was included in the 2021 exhibition Women in Abstraction at the Centre Pompidou. In April, 2024, Herrera was posthumously featured in the 60th Venice Biennale, Italy, curated by Brazilian curator and museum director Adriano Pedrosa.

=== Exhibition at the Whitney Museum of Art ===
From September 6, 2016, to January 9, 2017, Herrera's works were displayed in Carmen Herrera: Lines of Sight at the Whitney Museum of American Art, which was her first museum exhibition in almost two decades. With over fifty works shown, the show focused on pieces created from 1948 to 1978 and included paintings, works on paper, and three-dimensional projects. Dana Miller, a curator at the Whitney, organized the showing in chronological order, with three separate sections dedicated to important time periods in Herrera's work. The first section focused on works created from 1948 to 1958, during which time Herrera experimented with many types of abstraction. The second section focused on works from 1959 to 1971 and is a collection of paintings entitled Blanco y Verde, which Herrera considered the most important work of her career. The last section consisted of works from the 1960s and 1970s and contained more experimental pieces, as well as four wooden sculptural works. These pieces show Herrera's experimentation with figure/ground relationships and exhibit clear influence from Herrera's background in architecture. Many of these works had never been displayed to the public before. Miller said in regards to the design of the exhibition: "With material this strong, the curatorial imperative is really to step back and let the work shine". This exhibition was shown at the Wexner Center for the Arts, from February 4, 2017, to April 16, 2017.

=== Exhibition at Lisson Gallery ===
From May 3, 2016, to June 11, 2016, Herrera's works were displayed at Lisson Gallery in an exhibition titled Carmen Herrera: Recent Works. The exhibition showcased 20 major paintings and one sculpture created between 2014 and 2016. The show consisted of large-scale geometric paintings, with a few diptychs and triptychs as well. This exhibition was considered a tribute to Herrera, and also featured photographs of her studio and her New York apartment, which she lived in from 1954 on.

=== Estructuras Monumentales ===
"Estructuras Monumentales" was the first major exhibition of outdoor sculptures by Herrera, exhibited from July 11, 2019, through Nov 8, 2019 at City Hall Park in Manhattan. She first conceived the series in the 1960s with a group of diagrammatic sketches that extended the experience of her paintings into three dimensions, but the works remained unrealized. This exhibition, organized by Public Art Fund and curated by Daniel S. Palmer shared her "estructuras" with public audiences for the first time.

== Film ==
Beginning in 2014, Alison Klayman, director of the acclaimed Ai Weiwei: Never Sorry, started work on a documentary about Herrera. The documentary, titled The 100 Years Show, premiered in 2015 at the Hot Docs Film Festival in Toronto. It was then released to Netflix and Vimeo on Demand on September 18, 2016.

The documentary "profiles abstract minimalist pioneer Carmen Herrera as she enjoys artistic success and fame that literally took a lifetime to happen". While focusing on her then upcoming 100th birthday, Klayman explores Herrera's upbringing, later years, and delayed rise to fame. The film generated largely positive reviews and further invigorated interest in Herrera's works.

== Later years and death ==
Losing the ability to walk, she lived at home with full-time carers in her later years. Her close friend and neighbor, Tony Bechara, gave her artistic input and critique. Manuel Belduma also continued to aid her.

She remarked that it is the "beauty of the straight line" that kept her going.

Carmen Herrera died on February 12, 2022, at the age of 106.
