= Madman (1981 film) =

1982 film

- Original 1981 theatrical one-sheet
- Directed by: Joe Giannone
- Written by: Joe Giannone
- Produced by: Gary Sales
- Starring: Gaylen Ross; Tony Fish; Harriett Bass; Seth Jones; Jan Claire; Alex Murphy; Jimmy Steele; Carl Fredericks; Michael Sullivan; Paul Ehlers
- Cinematography: James Lemmo
- Edited by: Daniel Lowenthall
- Music by: Stephen Horelick
- Distributed by: Jensen Farley Pictures
- Release date: October 30, 1981 (Albuquerque)
- Running time: 88 minutes
- Country: United States
- Language: English
- Budget: $350,000
- Box office: $1.3 million

Madman is a 1981 American slasher film written and directed by Joe Giannone and starring Gaylen Ross and Paul Ehlers. The plot focuses on an axe-wielding murderer named Madman Marz who, after accidentally being summoned by a group of campers during a campfire tale, begins to stalk and murder the young adults.

Originally based on the upstate New York urban legend of the Cropsey maniac, the film was conceived by Giannone and producer Gary Sales, both first-time feature filmmakers who had met in college. Their initial premise and main antagonist was changed last-minute due to conflicts with The Burning (1981), which featured the Cropsey villain and was in production at the same time.

Madman was given a regional platform release by Jensen Farley Pictures, opening in Albuquerque, New Mexico on October 30, 1981, and screening throughout the United States over the following two years. It received largely unfavorable reviews from critics, though it became a sleeper hit in the drive-in theater circuit in the United States. Though not prosecuted for obscenity nor officially listed as a video nasty, the film was seized by police forces in Hampshire, England during the video nasty panic.

In the years since its release, Madman has achieved a cult following. In 2017, it was named one of the greatest slasher films of all time by Complex magazine.

== Plot ==
Near the end of camping season, a group of senior counselors and campers—including T. P., Betsy, Ellie, Dave, Stacy, Bill, Richie, and the middle-aged head counselor Max—are gathered around a campfire. Max tells them the legend of Madman Marz, who murdered his wife and children with an axe in a nearby abandoned house. He was lynched and scarred by angry villagers, but somehow escaped from his noose into the woods. When Max warns the campers that saying his name aloud will summon him, Richie mockingly shouts his name aloud and throws a rock through the window of Marz's old home, to Max's annoyance. After finishing the story, the counselors and campers all return to their campsite, except for Richie, who spots a figure in the trees and stays behind to follow him. Unknown to him, the figure is Marz, having been summoned by Richie's incitement. Richie enters Marz's home, but finds no trace of him.

Max leaves the campsite to get supplies and spend the night out on his own, leaving the others in charge. The campsite's drunken chef is killed by Marz while the other counselors relax. When Dave discovers Richie is missing, T. P. sets out into the woods to look for him, but is caught by Marz, who hangs him from a tree with a noose. Dave then sets out to look for both of them and is decapitated by Marz. Stacy, who has by now become suspicious, leaves Betsy to watch the children and warns Ellie and Bill. She then drives out into the woods and discovers Dave's body; in a panic, she tries to escape in her truck, but it stalls. When she exits the truck to fix it, Marz jumps onto the hood of the truck while she is still under it, decapitating her.

After Ellie discovers Marz taking Stacy's body away, she and Bill attempt to escape in the truck themselves, but Marz pulls Bill out of the truck and kills him. Ellie flees back to the campsite, but Marz stalks her through the cabins and eventually hits her in the chest with his axe. Meanwhile, having been lost in the woods for some time, Richie returns to Marz's home. He enters the basement and is horrified by what he sees there.

Betsy glimpses Ellie's bloodied body through the cabin window and phones Max to warn him. She arms herself with a double-barrel shotgun after seeing Marz running through the camp, but accidentally shoots and kills the wounded Ellie when Marz throws her against the window. The children are awoken by the gunshot, and Betsy immediately orders them onto the bus. Marz tries to board the bus, but Betsy fends him off. After ordering the bus driver to bring the children to safety, Betsy pursues Marz into his home, but he overpowers her and drags her into the basement where he has been keeping all the bodies of his victims, including those of his wife and children. Marz impales Betsy on a coat rack, but she manages to wound him with a hunting knife before dying, causing him to knock over a candle and start a fire. Marz escapes into the forest as the house burns down.

As Max is driving back to camp, he encounters a traumatized Richie on the road, who tells him that Madman Marz is real. Marz is then seen stalking through the forest, waiting to be summoned again.

== Cast ==
- Gaylen Ross as Betsy (credited as Alexis Dubin)
- Tony Fish as T. P.
- Harriet Bass as Stacy
- Seth Jones as Dave
- Jan Claire as Ellie
- Alex Murphy as Bill
- Jimmy Steele as Richie
- Carl Fredericks as Max
- Michael Sullivan as "Dippy"
- Paul Ehlers as "Madman" Marz

== Production ==
=== Development ===
In 1979, filmmakers Joe Giannone and Gary Sales, both graduates of Richmond College, were inspired to make a horror film after the commercial successes of recent low-budget horror films. In developing a screenplay, Sales recalled the urban legend of the Cropsey maniac which he had heard as a child and suggested it as a possible basis for the story. The two devised the working title Madman: The Legend Lives, with Giannone writing the screenplay, while Sales attempted to find an investor to help fund the production. After numerous failed attempts at attracting an investor, producer Sam Marion agreed to help fund the picture.

By 1980, Giannone and Sales had secured enough financing to enter production; it was during this time that the filmmakers became aware of Harvey Weinstein’s The Burning (1981), also featuring the Cropsey maniac. Because the two films resembled each other too much—which would lead to a canceling effect for both projects—Giannone decided to halt production and rewrite the script. The idea of Cropsey was changed to the fictionalized "Madman Marz," a farmer who had massacred his family and lynched by an angry mob, whose presence is claimed to still haunt the woods near his home. With a Frank Sinatra tour entitled Frank Sinatra: The Legend Lives being produced around the same time, the filmmakers also decided to alter the film's name to simply Madman.

=== Casting ===
An advertisement in Backstage was placed to cast the film, and an open audition was held in which around 300 actors attended. Paul Ehlers, originally an artist designing promotional materials for the film, was offered the role of the villain, Madman Marz, by Giannone. Ehlers had trained in martial arts for many years and so had the requirements to play the killer.

For the role of Max, the middle-aged head counsellor, Giannone and Sales had originally wanted to approach screen legend Vincent Price, but with the movie being non-union, they felt that the actor would decline the offer. Gaylen Ross, who had previously starred in the zombie epic Dawn of the Dead (1978), was cast as the lead heroine, Betsy, and credited under the name Alexis Dubin. The rest of the cast were made up mainly of first-time actors. According to Ross, because the film was a non-union production, the cast and crew were credited with pseudonyms to avoid breaching their membership with the Screen Actors Guild.

=== Filming ===
During the summer of 1980, the producers had begun location scouting, eventually settling on Fish Cove in Southampton, New York, which provided all of the required locations in the script. Principal photography commenced in November 1980 at Fish Cove Inn in Southampton, for what was to be all-night shoots. According to actress Gaylen Ross, as the leaves were starting to turn brown and fall from the trees, the production were forced to find as many as possible and paint them green to give the impression that the film was set in summer. However, Frederik Neumann's character Max states early in the film, around the campfire, that there is only "one weekend left before Thanksgiving" and his "winter vacation down South", so it must be assumed then that the action does take place in a cold November night and not during Summertime.

Fish Cove not only provided a large house to film in but also twenty-five cabins that the cast and crew could stay in. As it was out of season, the filmmakers had to hire out the entire camp. For the room and board that the complex offered, the crew was charged only $25 per head, with the staff having to work nights to accommodate for their guests.

The special effects in the film were created with practical methods, some of which were dubious and demanded the scenes being filmed quickly: The opening scene, which sees Max tells the story of Madman Marz around a campfire, actor Tony Fish was given only one night to memorize the song that he sings in an effort to creep out his fellow counsellors, as the prosthetics for Madman Marz were late arriving on set, and the director was forced to rethink his shooting schedule. Other practical effects included dummy heads made of condoms with fake blood, which, when hit with an axe, created the image of a skull being crushed.

On December 8, 1980, towards the end of the shoot, filming was abandoned for one day when news came over the radio that singer John Lennon had been murdered in New York and so as a mark of respect, the filming was put on hold for the day.

== Soundtrack ==
Original music for Madman was created by Stephen (Steve) Horelick with Gary Sales filling the role as musical director.

== Release ==
Madman remained in distribution limbo through much of 1981 until being acquired by Jensen Farley Pictures at the end of the year. It received regional releases in numerous markets, opening on October 30, 1981, in Albuquerque, New Mexico. In January 1982, the film screened in Wilmington, Delaware and Detroit, Michigan. It had its premiere in New York City the following year on January 7, 1983, and in Los Angeles on February 18, 1983.

=== Home media ===
Madman was released on DVD in 2001 by Anchor Bay Entertainment with a non-anamorphic transfer. The film was again released on DVD by Code Red on September 28, 2010. This edition, though anamorphic, and containing numerous bonus materials, boasted an inferior transfer that lacked blue hues present in the original negative. On May 12, 2015, the independent label Vinegar Syndrome issued the film on Blu-ray for the first time, featuring a new 4K restoration from the original negatives. A Blu-ray release by Arrow Films followed in the United Kingdom in August 2015. In April 2022, Vinegar Syndrome reissued the film in 4K UHD Blu-ray format.

== Reception ==
=== Box office ===
Over the course of the year following its autumn 1982 release, Madman became a sleeper hit in the drive-in circuit and ultimately grossed $1.35 million in the United States.

=== Critical response ===
Linda Gross, of the Los Angeles Times, deemed the screenplay "predictable" and the film "another truly terrible and ludicrous horror movie about a crazy ax murderer lurking around a camp for gifted children." The Journal News referred to it as "the first moronic exploitation movie" of the year, deeming it "the sort of movie that parodies the frustrations of everyday life–the car that won't start when you most need it, the flashlight that refuses to light, the noose that won't untie once it's around your neck." The Baltimore Evening Sun's Lou Cedrone criticized the film's unoriginality, writing: "The butchery is the usual. There are decapitations and open gashes... There isn't a trace of intelligence in it." Bill O'Connor of The Akron Beacon Journal wrote that the film "takes the simple scenario of jump-at-you and plays with it again and again. There is no attempt to add mystery to the plot. We know whodunit." Variety awarded the film a favorable review, deeming it "a well-made, low-budget horror film."

Robert Firsching of AllMovie called it an "unremarkable slasher film", writing "only genre completists with completely undiscriminating tastes are likely to be frightened or entertained". Scott Weinberg of FEARnet gave the film a negative review, saying that Madman was "better left in the annals of your vague memory." TV Guide gave the film a negative review, complimenting the film's photography, but also stated that the film was "predictable" and "boring" calling it "[a] wholly derivative splatter movie".

Dennis Schwartz from Ozus' World Movie Reviews gave the film a grade D, calling it "Frightfully inept", and criticized the film's acting, execution, pacing, weak story line, and music.

On the review aggregator website Rotten Tomatoes, 30% of 10 critics' reviews are positive, with an average rating of 4.0/10.

== Legacy ==
Madman went on to develop a cult following in the years following its initial release. In 2017, Complex named it the 25th greatest slasher film of all time.

New York deathgrind band Mortician used a soundbyte from one of the film's trailers for the song "Madman Marz" on their 2004 album Re-Animated Dead Flesh.

In 2024, Vinegar Syndrome released a novelization of the film by author Matt Serafini.

== Sources ==
- Albright, Brian (2012). Regional Horror Films, 1958-1990: A State-by-State Guide with Interviews. Jefferson, North Carolina: McFarland. ISBN 978-0-786-47227-7.
- Bonacore, Victor (dir.) (2010). The Legend Still Lives: 30 Years of Madman (Documentary). Code Red DVD.
- Donahue, Suzanne Mary (1987). American Film Distribution: The Changing Marketplace. Ann Arbor, Michigan: UMI Research Press. ISBN 978-0-835-71776-2.
- Muir, John Kenneth (2010). Horror Films of the 1980s. Jefferson, North Carolina: McFarland. ISBN 978-0-786-45501-0.
- Nowell, Richard (2010). Blood Money: A History of the First Teen Slasher Film Cycle. London: Bloomsbury. ISBN 978-1-441-12496-8.
