= Gaylen Ross =

American actress

- Ross in 2026
- Born: August 15, 1950 (age 76); Indianapolis, Indiana, U.S.
- Citizenship: American; Israeli
- Education: Monterey Peninsula College; The New School
- Occupations: Director; writer; producer; actress
- Years active: 1978–present
- Website: grfilmsinc.com

Gaylen Ross (born August 15, 1950) is an American director, writer, producer and actress, directing documentaries for over 35 years including her documentary on diamond dealers and New York's 47th Street, Dealers among Dealers and for directing the 2008 documentary Killing Kasztner. She is also known for her brief career in front of the camera for playing Francine Parker in the 1978 horror film Dawn of the Dead.

== Background ==
Gaylen Ross was born and raised in Indianapolis, Indiana, where she graduated from Broad Ripple High School in 1967. She studied at Monterey Peninsula College in California, and later received her BA from The New School for Social Research in Literature. She was managing editor of the literary journal Antaeus and Ecco Press from 1975 to 1977.

Ross holds citizenship in the United States and Israel. In 2015, she was named to the Indianapolis Public School Education Foundation's Hall of Fame.

== Career ==
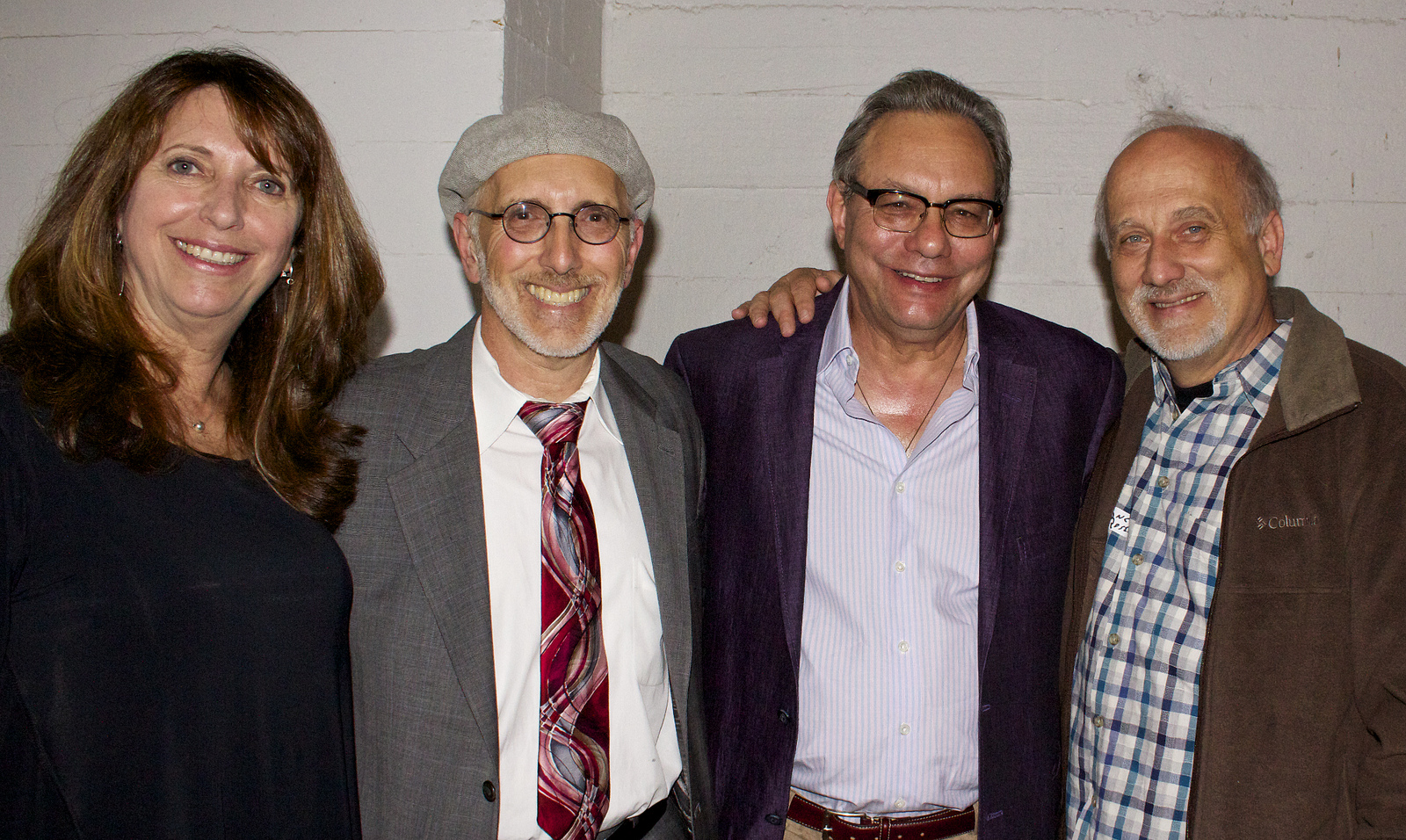
Gaylen Ross, Nick Licata, Lewis Black and Lance Rosen at Seattle's NW Film Forum, June 11, 2012

Ross's documentary films include 2008's Killing Kasztner and Dealers Among Dealers, a documentary of New York's 47th Street diamond trade. Ross's company, GR Films, has produced Listen To Her Heart: The Life and Music of Laurie Beechman; Not Just Las Vegas, about the rise of nationwide gambling in the USA; To Russia For Love, about the Russian Mail-order bride business; Selling The Dream: Stock Hype and Fraud; Dealers Among Dealers and the Emmy Award-winning Blood Money: Switzerland's Nazi Gold. Ross, along with John Connolly co-authored Married To A Stranger, about the Russian mail order bride business, published by Berkeley Publishing Group.

In 2009, Ross released Killing Kasztner on the life and assassination of Rezso Kasztner. Ross' other films include Dealers Among Dealers (1995) Ross wrote Blood Money: Switzerland’s Nazi Gold (1997), co-produced with Stephen Crisman; After Solidarity: Three Polish Families in America and Caris' Peace, which documents film and stage actress Caris Corfman. Other films and television projects have focused on bank fraud, gambling in America, and Russian mail-order brides. She has directed productions for “The Jewish Foundation for the Righteous" and the "UJA Federations of North America."

Ross starred as "Francine" in George A. Romero's 1978 horror film Dawn of the Dead, followed by her portrayal of "Betsy" in the 1981 slasher film Madman then as Leslie Nielsen's adulterous wife "Becky Vickers" in George Romero and Stephen King's 1982 film Creepshow.

Current projects include professional boxing documentary TitleShot. With co-director Andy Cohen, projects in post-production include films on the Village Gate, and human rights activists. Ross is collaborating with Cohen on Beijing Spring, a documentary about artistic freedom and the democracy movement between 1978 and 1982 in China.

Ross and Cohen directed the 2019 documentary Ximei, produced by Ai Weiwei. The film premiered at the International Film Festival and Forum on Human Rights in Geneva.

== Filmography ==
As a director:

- 1989 Out of Solidarity
- 1990 Time for Art
- 1991-2011 Investigative Reports
- 1994 Not Just Las Vegas
- 1995 Dealers Among Dealers
- 1999 To Russia for Love: Mail-Order Brides
- 2003 Listen to Her Heart: The Life and Music of Laurie Beeckman
- 2008 Killing Kasztner
- 2011 Caris' Peace
- 2019 Ximei
- 2021 Beijing Spring
- 2023 TitleShot
- Aaron Sapiro: The Jew Who Sued Henry Ford

As an actress:

- 1978 Dawn of the Dead as Francine "Fran Flygirl" Parker
- 1981 Madman as Betsy
- 1982 Creepshow as Becky Vickers
