= Killing Kasztner =

2008 film by Gaylen Ross

Killing Kasztner: The Jew who Dealt with the Nazis is a feature-length theatrical documentary about Rudolf Kastner, and directed by Gaylen Ross.

Ross first learned of Kasztner while working on another documentary, Blood Money: Switzerland's Nazi Gold. Ross interviewed a Hungarian woman who asserted that Kasztner had saved her life. Ross spent the next eight years researching and filming the documentary on Kasztner. She interviewed survivors who had been rescued by Kasztner, Kasztner's living relatives, the son of the opposing lawyer in Kasztner's case, historians, journalists, and Kasztner's assassin, Ze'ev Eckstein.

The film premiered at the 2008 Toronto International Film Festival, and was well received by critics. Its U.S. premiere was October 23, 2009.

== Pre-production ==
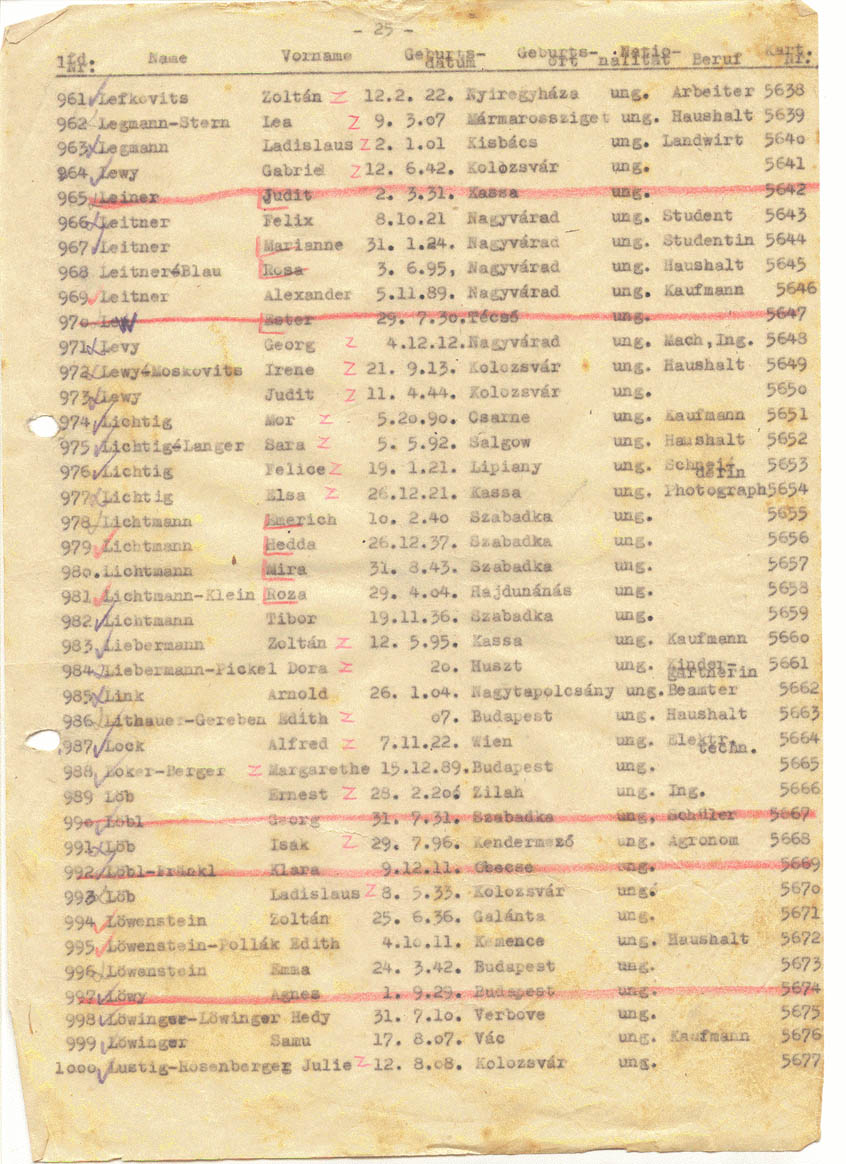
Kasztner train passenger list, page L25

In June 2001, Ross was invited to the Museum of Jewish Heritage in New York City to film the first conference on Kasztner in the United States. The event was intended as an academic forum, but Kasztner survivors became outraged when accusations of Kasztner's collaboration with the Nazis were brought up. Also in attendance was Kasztner's granddaughter, who asked why her grandfather was still being blamed for the deaths of Jews he could not save.

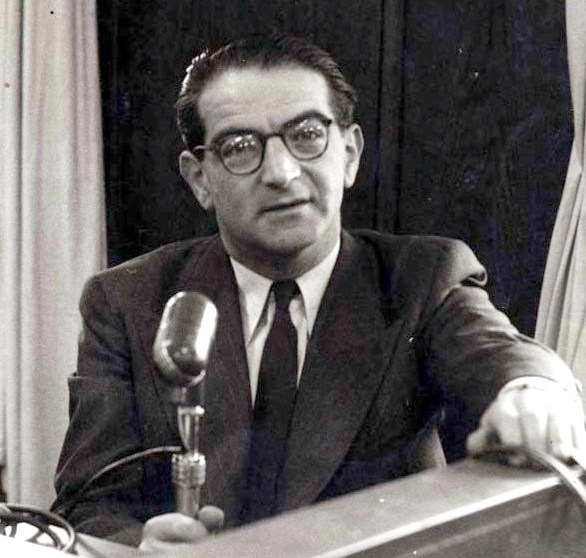
Rudolf Kasztner

== Synopsis ==
Kasztner's daughter and his three granddaughters seek redemption for their family name. Survivors of Kasztner's transport want the shame erased from their rescue. Their lives, they have been told, were delivered at the expense of others. On the other side of this issue is a young lawyer, whose father was responsible for Kasztner's legal defeat. He wants to fulfill his father's wish, and prevent Kasztner's name from joining the legion of Holocaust heroes.

Ross details Kasztner's rescue efforts as well as the accusations against Kasztner and the trial that followed. In the film, Ross interviews Ze'ev Eckstein, who was convicted for Kasztner's death. Eckstein and the other conspirators served only 7 years of their life sentences, after being commuted on recommendation from Israel's first Prime Minister, David Ben-Gurion.

Eckstein was 20 years old when he was first employed by Israel's fledgling secret service. Hoping to make a name for himself, he turned double agent by right-wing extremists. Eckstein's goal was to avenge the hundreds of thousands of Hungarian Jews whose deaths were blamed on Kasztner. On the night of the murder, Eckstein explains that the first bullet fired at Kasztner was a dud, prompting Kasztner to run into bushes in a dark Tel Aviv garden. Eckstein said he fired two additional bullets before another conspirator fired a fourth bullet that would ultimately kill Kasztner. As the film unfolds, Eckstein and Ross eventually revisit the scene of the crime. Zsuzsa accompanied by Michal and Merav later visited the graves of her parents, Kasztner and his wife to pay their respects.

Most notably, the film sets up a meeting between Kasztner's daughter and her father's assassin.

== Production ==
Ross commented in an interview with Aviva Berlin:

The film is very personal, very emotional in the portrayal of the families and survivors, and they were terribly candid and open in their view of what had happened to them over the years, and the effects of the trial and murder on their lives. Especially Kasztner's daughter Zsuzsi. And because the film shows the other side, significantly the murderer's revelations and personal history, and other detractors of Kasztner, I understood how sensitive and potentially upsetting the film could be. What was gratifying was to see how the audience respected the balance and understood, I believe, that I tried to show everyone in the film, pro or con Kasztner, with dignity and to allow their voices to be heard. I didn't always agree with some of the positions taken, but I tried to have their opinions represented.

When asked why it is still so difficult to talk about Kasztner even half a century later, Ross commented in her interview with FF2 Media's Jan Lisa Huttner:

I'm trying to separate the truth about Kasztner (and what Kasztner tried to do) from the rumors, falsehoods, misinformation, and politics. I was not there, but I've certainly read and looked at the newest research that has evolved over five decades. Archives have been opened, and new interpretations are now being given to the Hungarian Holocaust. This information was not available to Judge Benjamin Halevi during the original trial in Israel; not available to Ben Hecht, author of Perfidy (book); not available to the world then.

== Reception ==
The film was well received by critics. Amy Biancolli of the Houston Chronicle said, "Killing Kastzner...digs deep and scores big". Martin Perez of The New Republic called Kasztner, "a movie so philosophically contentious, also in the abstract, that anyone who ponders well will want to ponder here". Alison Gang of the San Diego tribute wrote, "It’s one thing when a documentary tells a story that has already unfolded. But when it provides a new window onto the past and even creates new chapters, that’s when documentary filmmaking reaches its pinnacle."

Killing Kasztner received the Audience Award for Best Documentary at the 2009 Boston Jewish Film Festival.
