= Beijing Spring =

Late-1970s period of liberalization in China

The Beijing Spring (Chinese: 北京之春; pinyin: Běijīng zhī chūn) refers to a brief period of political liberalization during the "Boluan Fanzheng" period in the People's Republic of China (PRC). It began as the Democracy Wall movement in Beijing, which occurred in 1978 and 1979, right after the end of the Chinese Cultural Revolution. The name is derived from "Prague Spring", an analogous event which occurred in Czechoslovakia in 1968.

== History ==
During the Beijing Spring, the general public was allowed greater freedom to criticize the government than the Chinese people had previously been allowed under the government of the People's Republic of China. Most of this criticism was directed towards the Cultural Revolution and the government's behavior during that time. It was made public with the Democracy Wall Movement, a Chinese democracy movement.

=== 1990s ===
The phrase "Beijing Spring" was also used during a more recent period of political thaw in the PRC from September 1997 to mid November 1998. During this 'new Beijing Spring' the Chinese authorities relaxed some control over political expression and organisation. The relatively trouble-free handover of Hong Kong to China from the United Kingdom and the death of Deng Xiaoping in early 1997 were precursors to this brief period of liberalisation.

It was during this second "Beijing Spring" that the China Democracy Party was founded and legally registered by some local authorities. The Democracy Wall Movement dissident Wei Jingsheng was released and exiled, China signed the International Covenant on Civil and Political Rights, and China was visited by US President Bill Clinton and UN Human Rights Commissioner Mary Robinson at this time. By the end of 1998 the government had again cracked down on leading dissidents and those involved in the fledgling opposition Chinese Democracy Party.

== See also ==
- 1976 Tiananmen incident
- Beijing Spring – 2020 documentary film
- Bourgeois liberalization
- Campaign against spiritual pollution
- Chinese democracy movements
- Democracy Wall
- Hundred Flowers Campaign
- Scar literature
- Wei Jingsheng
