= Eva Orner =

Australian film producer and director

- Occupations: Producer, director

Eva Orner is an Australian Academy and Emmy Award-winning film producer and director based in Los Angeles. Her works include Untold Desires (winner of Best Documentary at the Australian Film Institute Awards, the Logie Awards and the Australian Human Rights Awards), Strange Fits of Passion (nominated for the Critics' Award at the Cannes Film Festival), Taxi to the Dark Side (winner of the 2008 Academy Award for Best Documentary), and Gonzo, The Life and Work of Dr. Hunter S. Thompson. Orner's directorial debut, The Network, a feature documentary set behind the scenes of Afghanistan's largest television station, premiered in the US in March 2013.

== Early life ==
Orner grew up in Melbourne, Victoria, and was educated at Mount Scopus Memorial College and Monash University, where she earned a Bachelor of Arts degree in 1993.

== Career ==
Orner, along with actress Cate Blanchett, was one of only two Australians nominated for an Oscar in 2008. Most commentators predicted that Michael Moore's Sicko would win the Best Documentary category. However, to the surprise of many, Orner's Taxi to the Dark Side, which examines US torture practices in Afghanistan, Iraq and Guantánamo Bay, received the award. Within hours, Orner created controversy by describing the US Government as "a bunch of war criminals".

Orner directed and produced the AACTA award winning feature documentary Chasing Asylum. Released in 2016, the film takes a critical look at Australia's treatment of refugees and asylum seekers. She also directed and produced Bikram: Yogi, Guru, Predator, for Netflix. The film was released in 2019 and had its world premiere at the Toronto International Film Festival.

In 2021, her film Burning was released. It is about climate change and the Black Summer Australian fires of 2019–2020. Burning had its world premiere at the Toronto International Film Festival.

In June 2022, HBO announced that Orner would be directing a documentary about the Ohio State University abuse scandal. A staffer at Smokehouse Pictures said in October 2023 that they were "still thick in production" on the documentary. The resulting film, Surviving Ohio State, was released on June 17, 2025.

In April 2024, HBO released Brandy Hellville & the Cult of Fast Fashion, a documentary film directed by Orner.

== Personal life ==
Orner is a vegetarian. She drives an electric car.
