= Alison Klayman =

American filmmaker and journalist (born 1984)

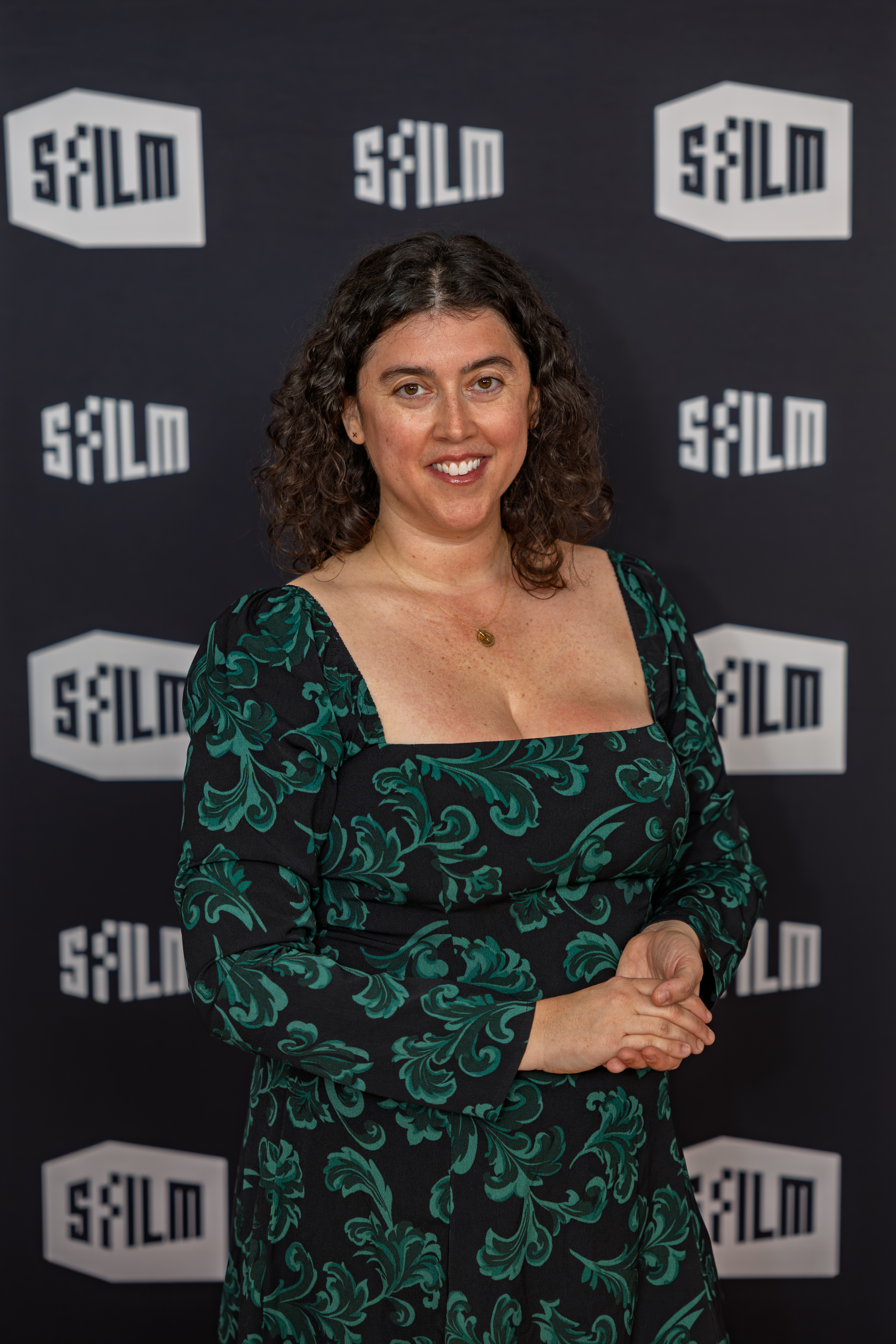
- Klayman in 2026
- Born: 1984 (age 41–42)
- Education: Brown University

Alison Klayman (born 1984) is an American filmmaker and journalist best known for her award-winning 2012 documentary Ai Weiwei: Never Sorry.

== Life and career ==
Klayman grew up in Philadelphia and graduated from Brown University in 2006 with a bachelor of arts degree in history. After her studies she went on a five-month trip to China with a college classmate and wound up staying to learn Chinese and work. She has contributed to PBS Frontline, National Public Radio and The New York Times.

After meeting artist Ai Weiwei while filming his exhibit for a local gallery, she started shooting footage for a longer documentary in December 2008. Ai Weiwei: Never Sorry debuted at the Sundance Film Festival and won the Special Jury Prize and a 2013 Alfred I. duPont-Columbia Award.

Klayman's documentary on Abercrombie & Fitch focused on the store's success and controversies, including its racist and exclusionary practices. White Hot: The Rise & Fall of Abercrombie & Fitch was released on Netflix in 2022.

In that same year, Klayman also released "Unfinished Business," a documentary centered on the WNBA, primarily the New York Liberty, one of the league's original franchises. The film centered upon the Liberty's debut season along with the rest of the league in 1997 as well as their 25th anniversary campaign in 2021. ""Unfinished Business," to me, means that there's a potential that has yet to be fulfilled for this league and its place in the culture," Klayman told Geoff Magliocchetti of Sports Illustrated. It stands for progress for women, trans, gay, black athletes, and so many things. But, fundamentally, I do think the biggest thing that this film talks about is the WNBA's trajectory."

Klayman is Jewish.

== Filmography ==
- Ai Weiwei: Never Sorry (2012)
- The 100 Years Show (2015)
- 11/8/16 (2017)
- Take Your Pills (2018)
- The Brink (2019)
- Jagged (2021)
- White Hot: The Rise & Fall of Abercrombie & Fitch (2022)
- Unfinished Business (2022)

== Awards and honors ==
- Alfred I. DuPont-Columbia Award
- Alliance of Women Film Journalists
- Ashland Independent Film Festival
- DGA Award nomination for Outstanding Directorial Achievement in Documentary
- Filmmaker Magazine "25 New Faces of Independent Film"
- New York Times International List of 20 Directors to Watch
- Sundance Film Festival – Special Jury Prize for Spirit of Defiance
- Taiwan International Documentary Film Festival
