= Draggan Mihailovich =

American television producer

- Occupations: Journalist, television producer
- Known for: Executive editor of 60 Minutes

Draggan Mihailovich is an American journalist and television producer. He was executive editor of 60 Minutes from August 2025 to May 2026.
