= Ai Weiwei: Never Sorry =

- Theatrical release poster
- Directed by: Alison Klayman
- Written by: Alison Klayman
- Produced by: Andy Cohen
- Starring: Danqing Chen; Ying Gao; Changwei Gu
- Production companies: United Expressions Media; MUSE Film and Television
- Distributed by: Sundance Selects
- Release dates: 22 January 2012 (Sundance Film Festival); 26 April 2012
- Running time: 91 minutes
- Country: United States
- Languages: English; Mandarin

Ai Weiwei: Never Sorry (in Chinese 艾未未：道歉你妹; official title in Taiwan 艾未未：草泥馬) is a 2012 documentary film about Chinese artist and activist Ai Weiwei, directed by American filmmaker Alison Klayman.

Director Klayman received a special jury prize at the 2012 Sundance Film Festival for the film, which also opened the Hot Docs Canadian International Documentary Festival in Toronto on 26 April 2012.

== Background ==
Klayman first met Ai in December 2008 in Beijing while she was living in China producing TV and radio features for PBS Frontline, National Public Radio, and AP Television. She filmed a short video for his show "New York Photographs 1983 - 1993" at Beijing's Three Shadows Photography Art Centre.

== Description ==
The film follows Ai from around the time he meets Klayman through just after his release from detention by Chinese authorities in spring of 2011. It presents him installing his show at the Haus der Kunst in Munich in September 2009 and his 100 million-ceramic porcelain piece at the Tate Modern a year later. In between he gets beaten up by the police in Chengdu, his million-dollar Shanghai studio is razed by the Chinese government, and he is finally detained in April 2011 at the Beijing airport on his way to Hong Kong and the international call for his whereabouts goes out. For the film, everyone from his brother to his mother to his first gallerist in New York to his wife are interviewed. Klayman deals with every aspect of his career as architect, photographer, conceptual artist, social critic and blogger.

Never Sorry opens in his studio compound in Beijing, called 258 Fake, home to 40 cats, and follows him from the development of his piece where he researched and posted the names of student victims of the May 2008 earthquake in Sichuan. The Sichuan Earthquake Names Project involves more than 50 volunteers and researchers collecting the names of the deceased students in Sichuan province towns, people Ai culled from his blog on Sina.com. On 12 May 2009, on the one-year anniversary of the disaster, Ai finishes posting the over 5,000 names. Two and a half weeks later, Ai's blog is shut down by Chinese authorities, and two days later, Ai joins Twitter. His Twitter page is still online, and he frequently posts new messages.

== Critical reception ==
Critics accorded the film an overwhelmingly positive response and it has a 98% rating on Rotten Tomatoes. Calling the film "galvanizing," critic Manohla Dargis of The New York Times noted: "The fluidity and convenience of digital moviemaking tools explain some of its freshness, as does Ms. Klayman's history as a budding documentarian. It's clear from watching both the feature and its earlier iterations that, while she was learning about Mr. Ai, she was also learning how to tell a visual story. It's easy to think that hanging around Mr. Ai, a brilliant Conceptual artist and an equally great mass-media interpolater, played a part in her education."

== Awards and nominations ==
- Won 2012 Sundance Film Festival "Special Jury Prize"
- Shortlisted for an Academy Award
- Alfred I. DuPont-Columbia Award
- Top Five Documentaries of 2012, National Board of Review
- Best Storytelling in a Documentary, Nantucket Film Festival
- Top Ten Films of the Year, New York Magazine
- Critics' Pick - New York Times, Washington Post
- Four Stars - Boston Globe, The Guardian | "A" rating - Entertainment Weekly
- News and Documentary Emmys - Best Arts Programming (Nominated)
- News and Documentary Emmys - Best Editing (Nominated)

== See also ==
- Ai Weiwei: The Fake Case, a 2013 documentary film
