= List of 60 Minutes episodes =

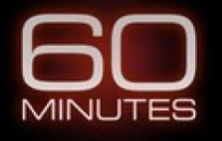
Logo of 60 Minutes, a CBS news magazine television show broadcast continuously since 1968

60 Minutes is an American television news magazine broadcast on CBS. Debuting in 1968, the program was created by Don Hewitt and Bill Leonard. The show is hosted by several correspondents; none share screen time with each other.

== Season overview ==
Series overview
Season	Episodes	Originally released (U.S.)		Rank	Average viewership (in millions)
Season	Episodes	First released	Last released	Rank	Average viewership (in millions)
1	19	September 24, 1968	July 22, 1969	83	12.5
2	23	September 16, 1969	September 1, 1970	92	12.8
3	18	September 15, 1970	June 8, 1971	101	10.3
4	32	September 19, 1971	June 18, 1972	66	14.0
5	39	October 1, 1972	September 7, 1973	68	15.4
6	31	January 6, 1974	September 1, 1974	78	21.5
7	34	January 5, 1975	September 7, 1975	57	– (Note: Partial season data not available)
8	33	December 7, 1975	September 12, 1976	52	23.4
9	49	September 16, 1976	September 4, 1977	18 (Note: Tied with Hawaii Five-O)	21.9
10	53	September 11, 1977	September 10, 1978	4 (Note: Tied with Charlie's Angels and All in the Family)	24.4
11	52	September 17, 1978	September 9, 1979	6	25.5
12	40	September 16, 1979	June 22, 1980	1	28.4
13	TBA	September 1, 1980	August 31, 1981	3	27.0
14	TBA	September 1, 1981	August 31, 1982	2	27.7
15	TBA	September 1, 1982	August 31, 1983	1	25.5
16	TBA	September 1, 1983	August 31, 1984	2	24.2
17	TBA	September 1, 1984	August 31, 1985	4	22.2
18	TBA	September 1, 1985	August 31, 1986	4	23.9
19	TBA	September 1, 1986	August 31, 1987	6	23.3
20	TBA	September 1, 1987	August 31, 1988	8	20.3
21	TBA	September 1, 1988	August 31, 1989	5	19.6
22	TBA	September 1, 1989	August 31, 1990	7	18.1
23	52	September 16, 1990	September 8, 1991	2	19.2
24	52	September 15, 1991	September 6, 1992	1	20.2
25	52	September 13, 1992	May 16, 1993	1	20.4
26	51	September 19, 1993	September 4, 1994	1	19.7
27	52	September 11, 1994	September 10, 1995	6	16.4
28	52	September 1, 1995	August 31, 1996	9	13.6
29	52	September 1, 1996	August 31, 1997	11	12.9
30	51	September 1, 1997	August 31, 1998	8	19.8
31	52	September 1, 1998	August 31, 1999	8	18.7
32	54	September 1, 1999	August 31, 2000	11	17.1
33	50	September 1, 2000	August 31, 2001	17	15.8
34	51	September 1, 2001	August 31, 2002	17	14.9
35	51	September 1, 2002	August 31, 2003	19	13.4
36	50	September 1, 2003	August 31, 2004	18	14.1
37	51	September 1, 2004	August 31, 2005	19	13.9
38	52	September 1, 2005	August 31, 2006	26	13.6
39	49	September 1, 2006	August 31, 2007	26	13.2
40	52	September 1, 2007	August 31, 2008	23	12.8
41	50	September 1, 2008	August 31, 2009	13	14.3
42	48	September 1, 2009	August 31, 2010	19	13.3
43	52	September 1, 2010	August 31, 2011	14	13.4
44	53	September 1, 2011	August 31, 2012	14	13.0
45	48	September 1, 2012	August 31, 2013	15	12.4
46	51	September 1, 2013	August 31, 2014	14	12.1
47	52	September 1, 2014	August 31, 2015	19	12.4
48	55	September 1, 2015	August 31, 2016	15	12.3
49	53	September 1, 2016	August 31, 2017	12	12.4
50	55	September 1, 2017	August 31, 2018	15	11.6
51	51	September 1, 2018	August 31, 2019	7	10.2
52	50	September 1, 2019	August 31, 2020	14	10.5
53	51	September 1, 2020	August 31, 2021	6	10.7
54	56	September 1, 2021	August 31, 2022	9	9.2
55	31	September 1, 2022	May 21, 2023	9	8.8
56	30	September 17, 2023	May 19, 2024	9	8.4
57	31	September 15, 2024	May 18, 2025	49 (Note: Starting with the 2024–2025 reason, Nielsen changed from a seven-day to 35-day, cross-platform rating system that measures viewers who may stream or watch linear programming.) (Note: Tied with Law & Order: Special Victims Unit)	8.7
58	30	September 28, 2025	May 17, 2026 (Note: One week after the season finale, additional new content was broadcast on May 24, 2026.)	27 (Note: Variety on September 15, 2016 reported 8.16 average viewers for the full season. The Guardian in August 2026 reported the average rating of 9.1 million viewers for the season.9.1 TV Series Finale reported the average rating as 7.782 million viewers. The Hollywood Reporter quoted a 9.7 million viewers using data until April 12, 2026 with the show tied at rank 27 with Wayward. The ranking period ended on April 12, 2026 before the finish of the season, not covering the final two months of broadcasts. Source: Analysis of Nielsen Multiplatform Data; Big Data P2+ Prime AA, L+35, 9/14/2025-4/12/2026 + Nielsen SCR, 35-Day Total Flight for streaming. Does not include series with less than 4 telecasts, sports or specials.)	8.2
59	TBA	September 13, 2026	TBA	TBA	TBA

== Episodes ==
=== Season 1 (1968–69) ===
The first season broadcast nineteen episodes from September 1968 to April 1969 with original content. There was one episode with rebroadcast segments. The two hosts were Harry Reasoner and Mike Wallace.

No.	Title	Topic(s)	Original release date
1	"U.S. Presidential Candidates"	U.S. politics; law enforcement; culture	September 24, 1968
2	"Richard Nixon Interview"	US defense; US politics; sports	October 8, 1968
3	"Hubert H. Humphrey Interview"	U.S. politics; U.S. defense; lifestyle	October 22, 1968
4	"Richard Nixon campaign/Joe Namath/invasion of Czechoslovakia/Percy Foreman"	U.S. politics; sport; French politics	November 12, 1968
5	"Jacqueline Grennan/Laurent Restaurant/Edmund Muskie"	U.S. politics; religion; food	November 26, 1968
6	"W. Averell Harriman/Prison Assaults/Dirty Football/Shoplifting/Adam Smith"	Incarceration in the United States; U.S. politics; sport; international finance	December 10, 1968
7	"Family of Martin Luther King, Jr./Ethel Kennedy/Jesus Christ"	U.S. civil rights; education; U.S. politics; religion	December 24, 1968
8	"Review 1968/Spiro Agnew/Smothers Brothers/Otto Skorzeny"	international events; U.S. politics; entertainment	January 7, 1969
9	"Middle East tensions/American whiskey/Enzymes"	Middle East; lifestyle	January 21, 1969
10	"Duke and Duchess of Windsor/Airline Hijacking/Eric Hoffer"	U.K. royalty; travel safety; U.S. crime	February 4, 1969
11	"Welfare/Skiing/Danny the Red/NYC Snow"	U.S. government; lifestyle; weather	February 18, 1969
12	"Fillmore/Presidential press conference/Pearl Harbor"	entertainment; U.S. politics; Japan-US relations	March 4, 1969
13	"Welfare/Palm Beach/John Mitchell/Baseball"	U.S. government; lifestyle; U.S. defense; sport	March 18, 1969
14	"H.L. Hunt/Post-war German children/Heroin addiction"	TBA	April 1, 1969
15	"Alice Roosevelt Longworth/Why Man Creates/Negative income tax/Nudity in Arts"	TBA	April 22, 1969
16	"Tora, Tora, Tora/The CLIO Awards"	TBA	May 13, 1969
17	"Africa war/Vaccine for German Measles/Fiddler on the Roof"	TBA	June 10, 1969
18	"The Death of Venice/American Detention Camps/Tito/Hair"	TBA	June 24, 1969
19	"Youth Rebellion / German Gas Warfare"	TBA	July 8, 1969

=== Season 2 (1969–70) ===
60 Minutes's second season from November 1969 to September 1970 with twenty-three episodes with original content and two with repeated segments.

No. overall	No. in season	Title	Topic(s)	Original release date
21	1	"Moscow After Dark/You're Getting Rich on My Land/Blacks in the construction industry/military punishment"	TBA	September 16, 1969
22	2	"Youth pandhandlers/Vietnam veterin inguries/Students visit USSR"	TBA	September 30, 1969
23	3	"Brig at Camp Pendleton/Crowhurst Saga/McCarthy"	TBA	October 14, 1969
24	4	"Third China/Sheen/Eyes Have It"	TBA	October 28, 1969
25	5	"Tensions in Northern Ireland/Avoiding the Draft/Zebra"	TBA	November 11, 1969
26	6	"Agnew and the Press/Walter Cronkite Goes Home/View from White House"	TBA	November 25, 1969
28	8	"Sex Education/Pro Football Betting/Haynesworth"	TBA	December 9, 1969
29	9	"Suicide/Mott/Russian Christians"	TBA	December 16, 1969
30	10	"Black Panther Party/Oral contraceptives/Military art"	TBA	January 6, 1970
31	12	"Gold mining labor conditions/Crime in Washington, D. C./business of gravestones "	TBA	January 20, 1970
32	13	"Hollywood cinematic products/Spanish bullfighting/Bernadette Devlin"	TBA	February 3, 1970
33	14	"Cause of avalanches/Federal gun control"	TBA	February 17, 1970
34	15	"U. S. Defense spending/Record industry/Golda Meir"	TBA	March 3, 1970
35	16	"Elizabeth Taylor, Richard Burton/Israel war tension/Auto bumpers"	TBA	March 24, 1970
36	17	"Emilio Pucci/Egypt war tensions/U.S. federal income tax returns"	TBA	March 31, 1970
37	18	"Rosemary Brown's music/Garbage crisis/Poll on Bill of Rights"	TBA	April 14, 1970
38	19	"Unemployment in the U.S./Bernie Cornfield/Interviews on Bill of Rights"	TBA	April 28, 1970
39	20	"Mitchell/Nickel/Krogager"	TBA	May 12, 1970
40	21	"White House Tour/Missing Children/Vietname Debate"	TBA	May 26, 1970
41	22	"Cry for Help/Stiles/B-1 Bomber"	TBA	June 9, 1970
42	23	"Vietname/Americans in Foreign Jails/Greatest Jazz Band"	TBA	June 16, 1970
43	24	"Special anthology edition"	TBA	August 18, 1970
44	25	"Nixon White House Tour/Military Amputees/Crowhurst"	TBA	September 1, 1970

=== Season 3 (1970–71) ===
60 Minutes's third season, eighteen episodes, from September 15, 1970, to June 8, 1971.

Mike Wallace was a host for the full season. Host Harry Reasoner left the show in December 1970 to co-anchor the ABC Evening News. On the December 8, 1970 show, Morley Safer replaced Reasoner.

No. in season	Title	Topic(s)	Original release date	Viewers (millions)
1	"When Porgy Came Home, If Cable TV Comes to Your House, Kurt Vonnegut"	TBA	September 15, 1970	N/A
2	"Police, William F. Buckley, Fidel Castro"	TBA	September 29, 1970	N/A
3	"Henry Kissinger, Will Rogers, Medgar Evers"	TBA	October 13, 1970	N/A
4	"Leila Khaled, Nuclear China, Detroit small cars"	TBA	October 27, 1970	N/A
5	"Charles de Gaulle, Marijuana Farming"	TBA	November 10, 1970	N/A
6	"Walter Nickel, Cannery Row, George McGovern, Aaron Copland at 70"	TBA	November 24, 1970	N/A
7	"Training Sky Marshals, Pierre Trudeau, Denisovich"	TBA	December 8, 1970	N/A
8	"Unsafe Toys, Faces of Jerusalem, Renaissance"	TBA	December 22, 1970	N/A
9	"Jews in Iron Curtain, Housing, Fellini"	TBA	January 5, 1971	N/A
10	"Underground Press, Carmelite Nuns, Helen Leavitt"	TBA	January 19, 1971	N/A
11	"Italian State Dinner, Ron Lyle"	TBA	February 2, 1971	N/A
12	"Crum, Gulf of Tonkin, Emmy Award"	TBA	March 16, 1971	N/A
13	"Thievery on the Waterfront, Tobacco Industry, Australian Women"	TBA	March 30, 1971	N/A
14	"George Scott, My Lay, Run Run Shaw"	TBA	April 13, 1971	N/A
15	"Chiang Kai-shek, Heart Health, Ping-Pong Diplomacy"	TBA	April 27, 1971	N/A
16	"LBJ Library, Swiss Banks, Mark-48 Torpedo"	TBA	May 11, 1971	N/A
17	"John Kerry, Middle East Oil Tankers, Eugene McCarthy"	TBA	May 25, 1971	N/A
18	"Immigration to Canada, People We Met"	TBA	June 8, 1971	N/A

=== Season 6 (1973-74) ===
- February 1974, "Oil and the Shah of Iran" interview of Shah Mohammad Reza Pahlavi by Mike Wallace

=== Season 9 (1976-77) ===
- October 24, 1976, "The Shah of Iran", second interview of Shah Mohammad Reza Pahlavi by Mike Wallace, produced by William K. McClure

A Peabody Award was given to CBS "60 Minutes" for work done in 1976.

=== Season 10 (1977-78) ===
Mike Wallace interviewed Vladimir Horowitz, pianist, on December 26, 1977. During the interview, Horowitz performed the piece “The Stars and Stripes Forever”.

During the summer of 1978, the segment "Three Minutes or So with Andy Rooney" featuring Andy Rooney first aired. On June 11, 1978, Rooney provided a video essay on advertising.

=== Season 12 (1979-80) ===
60 Minutes' twelfth season, forty episodes, from September 16, 1979 to June 22, 1980. The correspondents were Mike Wallace, Morley Safer, Dan Rather and Harry Reasoner. Weekly commentary provided by Andy Rooney.

No. in season	Title	Topic(s)	Original release date	Viewers (millions)
1	"On Trial for Murder;Palm Springs;Jesse Jackson & Billy Graham"	TBA	September 16, 1979	N/A
2	"Here's... Johnny;Oil in the Bank;Judgment Day"	TBA	September 23, 1979	N/A
3	"Castro;Northern Ireland;Getting High in School"	TBA	September 30, 1979	N/A
4	"Who Killed Georgi Markov?;The Luckiest Woman;The Bill"	TBA	October 7, 1979	N/A
5	"The Stolen Cezannes;Wimpy;The Grapes of Wealth"	TBA	October 14, 1979	N/A
6	"Edward Rubin, M.D.;Deep in the Heart of Scotland;By Design"	TBA	October 21, 1979	N/A
7	"Holy Smoke;The Pink Panther;The Great Depression"	TBA	October 28, 1979	N/A
8	"Swine Flu;Pavarotti;Give Me Your Tired..."	TBA	November 4, 1979	N/A
9	"Looking Back;Marva;It's a Doozie"	TBA	November 11, 1979	N/A
10	"The Ayatollah;The Foreign Legion;Wellness"	TBA	November 18, 1979	N/A
11	"Roy Innis;Justified Homicide?;Who Pays?.... You Do!"	TBA	November 25, 1979	N/A
12	"Equal Justice?;Safe Haven;The Brethren"	TBA	December 2, 1979	N/A
13	"It's No Accident;Helping;Garn Baum vs. the Mormons"	TBA	December 9, 1979	N/A
14	"The Hooker Memos;Earn It!;Snake Venom"	TBA	December 16, 1979	N/A
15	"Who Gives a Damn?;The Sheik;Hypnosis"	TBA	December 23, 1979	N/A
16	"Big John;Come Fly with Me;Roy Cohn"	TBA	December 30, 1979	N/A
17	"CCCP-TV in Moscow;B.M.O.C.;Native Sons"	TBA	January 6, 1980	N/A
18	"Deee-fense;Off the Books;George Who?"	TBA	January 13, 1980	N/A
19	"Bette Davis;The Thunderbirds;PDAP"	TBA	January 20, 1980	N/A
20	"Russian Spies in the U.S.A.;All About Oral;The Frontrunner?"	TBA	January 27, 1980	N/A
21	"Losers;Ezer;Wild to Regulate"	TBA	February 3, 1980	N/A
22	"Mr. X;Lenny; Me;The Marketplace"	TBA	February 10, 1980	N/A
23	"The Death of Edward Nevin;Anderson of Illinois;Yugoslavia"	TBA	February 17, 1980	N/A
24	"Uncle Sam Wants Your Money;Where There's a Will...;Citizen Loeb"	TBA	February 24, 1980	N/A
25	"The Iran File;Handcuffing the Cops?"	TBA	March 2, 1980	N/A
26	"Oman;Bobby Kright;Barry Goldwater"	TBA	March 9, 1980	N/A
27	"Remember Enewetak!;Blood Money;Cat Burglars"	TBA	March 16, 1980	N/A
28	"The Riddle of DMSO;Jarrett vs. Jarrett;Libya's Qaddafi"	TBA	March 23, 1980	N/A
29	"Inside Afghanistan;High-Low Silver"	TBA	April 6, 1980	N/A
30	"Scientology: The Clearwater Conspiracy;Gimme Shelter;Israeli Arms For Sale"	TBA	April 13, 1980	N/A
31	"Omega 7;Anne Lindbergh;Dam"	TBA	April 20, 1980	N/A
32	"Walking Small in Pitkin County;Here's...Johnny;$200 a Week - Tax Free"	TBA	April 27, 1980	N/A
33	"The Kissinger-Shah Connection?;Palm Springs;Not to My Kid, You Don't"	TBA	May 4, 1980	N/A
34	"Bonnie;Highway Robbery;Fellini"	TBA	May 11, 1980	N/A
35	"The Establishment vs. Dr. Burton;Who Killed Georgi Markov?;The Rock"	TBA	May 18, 1980	N/A
36	"Warning: living Here May be Hazardous to Your Health!;Memory of Vietnam;Hired Gun"	TBA	May 25, 1980	N/A
37	"A Nuclear Reaction;A Man Called L'Amour;This Year at Marienbad"	TBA	June 1, 1980	N/A
38	"Banking on Bahrain;God and Mammon;Cottage For Sale"	finance	June 8, 1980	N/A
39	"What Johnny Can't Read;The Foreign Legion;Who Gives a Damn?"	education;France	June 15, 1980	N/A
40	"Canary;Handcuffing the Cops?;Rolls-Royce"	criminal justice;transportation	June 22, 1980	N/A

=== Season 27 (1994–95) ===
- November 13, 1994 - Interview of the Rolling Stones, rock-n-roll band, by Ed Bradley

=== Season 42 (2009–10) ===
- January 31, 2010 - Interview of Beyoncé, pop singer, by Steven Kroft

=== Season 43 (2010–11) ===
- October 10, 2010 - Interview of Eminem, pop singer, by Anderson Cooper
- February 11, 2011 - Interview of Lady Gaga, pop singer, by Anderson Cooper

=== Season 44 (2011–12) ===
- November 20, 2011 - Interview of Taylor Swift, pop singer, by Lesley Stahl

=== Season 51 (2018–19) ===
- September 30, 2018 - Interview of Paul McCartney, pop singer, by Sharyn Alfonsi

=== Season 55 (2022–23) ===
60 Minutes's 55th season aired from September 1, 2022 to May 21, 2023. Full-time hosts include Lesley Stahl, Scott Pelley and Bill Whitaker. Reporters include Sharyn Alfonsi, Anderson Cooper and Jon Wertheim. On May 7, 2023, correspondent Cecilia Vega debuted on the show in the middle of the season. Norah O'Donnell contributed reporting on episode 13.

The 16th episode with the interview of Prince Harry had the highest ratings of the season.

No. in season	Title	Topic(s)	Original release date	Viewers (millions)
1	"President Biden, Ebrahim Raisi"	U.S. politics;Iran	September 18, 2022	10.197
2	"The Secretary of State, Inside the Committee, Rescuing Reefs"	international affairs; U.S. politics; ecology	September 25, 2022	7.144
3	"Olena Zelenska, What Happened at Grizzly Flats, Captain Kolisi"	Ukraine; ecology; sport	October 2, 2022	10.274
4	"Taiwan, After Ian, Church and State"	Taiwan;earth science;religion	October 9, 2022	7.624
5	"Bucha, Ukraine, Offshore wind farms; Deion Sanders"	Ukraine;energy;sport	October 16, 2022	10.719
6	"Dominion, American Prairie, Ina Garten"	U.S. elections;ecology;food	October 23, 2022	7.966
7	"Belief in the Ballot, Pathogen X, David Sedaris"	U.S. elections;healthcare;entertainment	October 30, 2022	8.041
8	"Angry in America, Buses from the Border, Ready or Not"	TBA	November 6, 2022	10.676
9	"The Surfside Mystery, The Paper Brigade, Sona and the Kora"	TBA	November 13, 2022	6.769
10	"The Most Dangerous Place in the World, The Panini Sticker Phenomenon, Wild Horses"	TBA	November 20, 2022	9.95
11	"Grave Injustice; Survival of the Friendliest; Comparative Oncology"	TBA	November 27, 2022	9.026
12	"French President; Mozambique Gorongosa National Park; Shane Van Boening"	TBA	December 4, 2022	10.464
13	"The Treasury Secretary, Suing Social Media, College of Magic"	TBA	December 11, 2022	7.825
14	"Convoy of Life, Litigation Funding, Lourdes"	TBA	December 18, 2022	9.594
15	"Radio Free Europe, The Vanishing Wild, Obesity"	TBA	January 1, 2023	9.258
16	"Prince Harry, Hans Zimmer"	TBA	January 8, 2023	11.215
17	"Star Power; Hide and Seek; The Guru"	TBA	January 15, 2023	6.33
18	"The IMF Report ; Investigating Donald Trump ; Red Hot Chili Peppers "	TBA	February 5, 2023	6.914
19	"Candles Against the Darkness; Prime Minister Marin; The Historymakers"	TBA	February 19, 2023	6.821
20	"Kherson Under Fire, The Girls of SOLA"	TBA	February 26, 2023	6.879
21	"Please Let Me Die; Who is Minding the Chatbots?; David Byrne "	TBA	March 5, 2023	6.932
22	"The State of the Navy; "Only in America" "	TBA	March 19, 2023	8.261
23	"Feeling of Feeling; Silicon Valley Scandal; Charles Barkley "	TBA	March 26, 2023	9.291
24	"MTG; The Secretary and the Border; Fire and Ice "	TBA	April 2, 2023	6.985
25	"The Origin of Everything; Sportswashing; The Resurrection Of Notre Dame "	TBA	April 9, 2023	7.571
26	"Revolution; The Unlikely Adventures of David Grann "	TBA	April 16, 2023	7.376
27	"Healing and Hope; Who is Ray Epps; Nicolas Cage"	TBA	April 23, 2023	7.414
28	"The Domino Effect; Out Of Thin Air; An American Down Under"	TBA	April 30, 2023	7.111
29	"This Ancient Atrocity; Lithium Valley; James Nachtwey"	TBA	May 7, 2023	7.234
30	"The Church's Firm; The Sperm Whales Of Dominica; Yannick Nézet-Séguin"	TBA	May 14, 2023	6.695
31	"Price Gouging; Targeting Seniors; Jeff Koons"	TBA	May 21, 2023	7.04

=== Season 56 (2023–24) ===
60 Minutes's 56th season aired from September 17, 2023, to May 19, 2024. Full-time hosts include Lesley Stahl, Scott Pelley and Bill Whitaker. Reporters include Sharyn Alfonsi, Anderson Cooper, Cecilia Vega and Jon Wertheim. With additional reporting by Holly Williams in the Ukraine for episode 2 and 29, Norah O'Donnell in episodes 4, 19, 31 and 33, Jonathan LaPook in episodes 4 and 27, and Margaret Brennan in episode 6.

Season 56 introduced a new feature ending each episode called "The Last Minute". The one-minute editorial provides an update on a previous story. The episode with the highest ratings was the first episode of the season.

No. in season	Title	Original release date	Viewers (millions)
1	"President Zelenskyy; Into the Streets; Prime Time in Colorado"	September 17, 2023	11.800
2	"CARE Court; Bankrolling the War; Hanging On"	September 24, 2023	7.184
3	"Attorney General; The Rise and Fall of Sam Bankman-Fried"	October 1, 2023	6.886
4	"The Godfather of AI; General Milley; Rich Paul; 3D Printing"	October 8, 2023	9.682
5	"President Biden; Rescue at the Kibbutz; The 50"	October 15, 2023	7.289
6	"The Five Eyes; A Prisoner of Iran; Pink; The Isle of Man "	October 22, 2023	9.907
7	"Vice President Harris; A Quiet Invasion; The Air We Breathe; The State of the Blues"	October 29, 2023	9.762
8	"John Eastman; Our Mistake Is Your Responsibility; Monkey Island"	November 5, 2023	7.393
9	"Iran's Assassins; The Heritage War; Horse Racing Reform?"	November 12, 2023	8.130
10	"Disappeared; The Stand; The Underboss; Africatown"	November 19, 2023	7.724
11	"Rise; Sealand; Ancient Vines"	November 26, 2023	8.415
12	"Chaos on Campus; Quantum Computing; Greta Gerwig"	December 3, 2023	6.547
13	"The Resistance; Red and Green; Novak Djokovic"	December 10, 2023	9.352
14	"The Hostage Story; Looting of Cambodia; Gnawa"	December 17, 2023	6.359
15	"Commercial Real Estate; Master of the Mind"	January 14, 2024	4.973
16	"Agency in Crisis/Interpol/Modern Ark"	January 28, 2024	6.546
17	"Chairman Powell; A Hole In The System; The Mismatch"	February 4, 2024	6.606
18	"Crisis in the Red Sea; Fake Electors; Finding Cillian Murphy"	February 18, 2024	7.160
19	"142 Days in Gaza; China"	February 25, 2024	6.762
20	"Operation Lone Star; 97 Books; Artemis "	March 3, 2024	7.334
21	"The Capital of Free Russia; Healing Justice"	March 17, 2024	7.161
22	"The Right to Be Wrong; AMLO; Law of the Sea "	March 24, 2024	7.120
23	"Targeting Americans; Indian Relay"	March 31, 2024	10.365
24	"Dr. Kuznetzov; Your Chatbot Will See You Now; The Ring"	April 7, 2024	6.653
25	"Scattered Spider; Knife; Tasmanian Tiger"	April 14, 2024	8.588
26	"Secretary of Commerce; On British Soil; Kevin Hart"	April 21, 2024	7.047
27	"Children of War; Nvidia; Crisis at Pearl Harbor"	April 28, 2024	6.809
28	"Leader Jeffries; Work to Own; St. Mary's"	May 5, 2024	6.509
29	"A Week in Israel; A Web of Intrigue"	May 12, 2024	6.216
30	"Pope Francis; Cuban Spycraft; The Album"	May 19, 2024	7.333

During the post-season, the July 14, 2024 episode contained original reporting on the July 2024 Trump assassination attempt.

=== Season 57 (2024–25) ===
60 Minutes' 57th season aired from September 15, 2024, to May 18, 2025. Full-time hosts included Lesley Stahl, Scott Pelley and Bill Whitaker. Reporters include Sharyn Alfonsi, Anderson Cooper, Cecilia Vega and Jon Wertheim. Additional coverage is provided by Norah O'Donnell in Washington, D.C. for episode 2, Holly Williams in Kyiv for episode 9, and Margaret Brennan on cryptocurrencies for episode 13.

The seventh episode on October 27, 2024, received the highest ratings of the season.

No. in season	Title	Original release date	Viewers (millions)
1	"The Prosecution of January 6th; Danger in the South China Sea; Dua Lipa"	September 15, 2024	10.477
2	"Scourge of Our Time; The Trustbuster; Inside the Archives"	September 22, 2024	6.601
3	"After the Hurricane; Vladimir Kara-Murza; Welcome to the W; The Mezcaleros"	September 29, 2024	9.565
4	"Election Special"	October 7, 2024	5.7
5	"Pennsylvania Counts; The Vatican's Orphans; Ballmer's Ballgame"	October 13, 2024	6.975
6	"Relief, N.C.; Navalny; The Swingiest County; The Cap Arcona"	October 20, 2024	7.284
7	"Deportation; Sanctions; Surfmen"	October 27, 2024	11.193
8	"Election Truth; Unintended Consequences; The Land of Novo"	November 3, 2024	8.168
9	"The Shift; The War Reporter; Robo; Mysterious Russian Deaths"	November 10, 2024	9.039
10	"The Promise; Aussiewood; Bhutan"	November 17, 2024	10.369
11	"Disruptor U.; Humans in the Loop; Lowriders of New Mexico"	November 24, 2024	6.786
12	"Notre Dame; Smith Island; Kate Winslet; Welcome to the Wedding"	December 1, 2024	9.057
13	"Boeing's Whistleblowers; Big Crypto; A Tutor for Every Student; Thai Elephants"	December 8, 2024	5.655
14	"Road to Damascus; Unveiling; The House of Hermès"	December 15, 2024	7.975
15	"The Pager Plot; The Iron River; Joy to the World"	December 22, 2024	8.736
16	"The Fires; The FBI Director; The Gaza Policy"	January 12, 2025	6.099
17	"What Will Mitch Do?; Robert Lighthizer; A Psychedelic Journey"	February 2, 2025	6.938
18	"28 Days; Policing the Internet; Timothée Chalamet"	February 16, 2025	5.592
19	"The Justice Department; CFPB; John Oliver"	February 23, 2025	6.826
20	"Allies and Enemies; Death Flights"	March 2, 2025	5.552 (Note: Broadcast during Super Bowl LIX.)
21	"Firing the Watchdogs; The Settlement; A Method to this Madness"	March 9, 2025	6.076
22	"Under The Radar; America's Own; Werner Herzog"	March 16, 2025	6.917
23	"Death On The Chazy River; Larkin's War; Mr. Clooney Goes To Broadway"	March 23, 2025	8.072
24	"Hostages; Voice Of America; Left Behind"	March 30, 2025	8.884
25	"The War in Gaza; The Prisoners; Wood to Whiskey"	April 6, 2025	5.669
26	"Zelenskyy; Greenland; Banana Ball"	April 13, 2025	9.626
27	"Bird Flu; Demis Hassabis; Flight of the Monarch"	April 20, 2025	6.332
28	"NIH; Evidence; Land of the Declining Sons"	April 27, 2025	6.689
29	"The Rule of Law; Freezing the Biological Clock"	May 4, 2025	6.855
30	"Fraud; To Walk Again; Jamie Lee Curtis"	May 11, 2025	6.097
31	"China's Spies; The Future of Warfare; Sounds of Cajun Country"	May 18, 2025	6.415

=== Season 58 (2025–26) ===
60 Minutes' 58th season started on September 28, 2025, with the same line-up of correspondents as season 57. The correspondents included in order of appearance during the first episode: Scott Pelley, Bill Whitaker, Anderson Cooper, Sharyn Alfonsi, Jon Wertheim, Cecilia Vega and Lesley Stahl. Additional reporting was provided by Margaret Brennan in episode 3, Norah O'Donnell in episodes 5, 6, 25, and 27, Holly Williams in episodes 15 and 23, and Major Garrett in episode 29.

The sixth episode on November 2, 2025 received the highest rating for the season. It was the highest rated episode since January 10, 2021 in season 53.

No. in season	Title	Topic(s)	Original release date	Viewers (millions)
1	"A Lonely Voice; The Mystery of the Eagle S; Dana White"	US current affairs; Baltic infrastructure; sports	September 28, 2025	10.025
2	"Vaccine Court; The Tequila Heist; This Is Rob Reiner"	Healthcare; criminal justice; entertainment	October 5, 2025	6.654
3	"The China Hack; Booms, Busts and Bubbles; The Road to Damascus"	Cyber-warfare; financial markets; Syria	October 12, 2025	10.149
4	"The Dealmakers; Erez Reuveni; Amy Sherald"	Middle East; US government; art	October 19, 2025	6.904
5	"On the Brink; Dr. Attia Will See You Now; The Mentalist"	Venezuela; aging; entertainment	October 26, 2025	11.100
6	"President Trump; Guinness Book of Records"	US government; entertainment	November 2, 2025	13.969
7	"The Family Farm; Collateral Damage; The Indomitable Margaret Atwood"	US economy; education; entertainment	November 9, 2025	7.569
8	"The President’s Pardon; Inside Anthropic; Chess Boxing"	US government; technology; sports	November 16, 2025	11.025
9	"The Bus on Route 62; The Last Best Place; The Empty Rooms"	Ukraine; war; Montana; land preservation; US gun violence	November 23, 2025	6.967
10	"Polymarket; CRISPR Kids; Lamine Yamal"	Speculation; science; sports	November 30, 2025	10.900
11	"MTG 2.0; Character AI; Watch Valley"	US government; AI; craft	December 7, 2025	7.250
12	"Germany Rearms; The Price of Life; Hooser Hysteria"	German defense; US medical; sports	December 14, 2025	10.160
13	"The Sherpas of Everest; Presenting the Kanneh-Masons"	Sports; music	December 21, 2025	10.350
14	"Maduro; Here Come the Humanoids; Alysa Liu"	Venezuela; US foreign relations; industrialization; artificial intelligence; sport	January 4, 2026	8.973
15	"Minneapolis, Inside CECOT, Salties"	Immigration enforcement; ecology	January 18, 2026	5.090
16	"Minneapolis; The Far Side of the Moon; Boom Chicago"	Immigration enforcement; space exploration; entertainment	February 1, 2026	7.000
17	"Generally Recognized as Safe; Youngest Survivors"	Food safety; nutrition; war survivors; US history	February 15, 2026	5.995
18	"Left Behind; South Africa’s Refugees; Is That Art?"	US economy; US immigration; South Africa; art	February 22, 2026	6.662
19	"Iran; Under Siege; Breaking The Cycle"	Iran; US justice system; mass shootings	March 1, 2026	7.214
20	"Targeting Americans; Pete Hegseth"	Military; technology; defense; Iran	March 8, 2026	7.320
21	"Choke Point; Laser Focus; Growing Up Behind Walls"	Military; technology; defense; Iran; disaster recovery	March 15, 2026	6.744
22	"Elemental Crisis; Turning the Ship Around; The Dog Aging Project"	Mining; industry; pets; science	March 22, 2026	7.807
23	"Inside the Tower; Unmanned; Wonder of the World"	Aircraft safety; military; technology; geography	March 29, 2026	10.299
24	"Return to RAM; Ghost Train; The Mardi Gras Indians"	US healthcare; transportation; culture	April 5, 2026	6.185
25	"Pope Leo's Church; Risk On The Road; What Happened To The Great White Sharks?"	Religion; transportation; ecology	April 12, 2026	10.058
26	"Iran's HEU; One Mother's Story; Wild Concerto"	Iran; nuclear security; Gaza; hostages; ecology; music	April 19, 2026	6.689
27	"Shots Fired; Ben Sasse; The Pigeon Mafia"	Political violence; lifestyle; criminal justice	April 26, 2026	7.332
28	"Disaster Tourists; Bird of War; Perfume Capital of the World"	Natural disaster; recovery; ecology; Columbia; lifestyle; France	May 3, 2026	6.740
29	"Prime Minister Netanyahu; Drawing the Lines; Gout Gout"	Israel; US politics; sport	May 10, 2026	6.564
30	"Betting on War; The Knowledge; Christopher Nolan"	Gambling; transportation; entertainment	May 17, 2026	7.265

=== Season 59 (2026) ===
60 Minutes' 59th season began on September 13, 2026. Three correspondents from the previous season — Lesley Stahl, Bill Whitaker and Jon Wertheim — will be joined by Ross Douthat and Norah O'Donnell. Douthat was a former opinion columnist at The New York Times. O'Donnell's role on the show changed from contributor to correspondent. Segments reported by additional contributors included Ariel Levy in episodes five and nine, Gianna Toboni, Holly Williams in episode six, Matt Gutman in episode seven and Trevor Phillips in episode eight. Several new contributors were introduced using the The Last Minute feature with the first on-screen appearances for Ariel Levy during the second episode, Gianna Toboni in the third episode, Trevor Phillips in the fourth episode and Sebastian Junger in the fifth episode. Matt Gutman's first on-screen appearance was during the introduction of the seventh episode.

No. in season	Title	Topic(s)	Original release date	Viewers (millions)
1	"Shot Down Over Iran; The Pardon Economy; Battering Ram"	U.S. military and Iran; U.S. justice system; sport	September 13, 2026	7.94
2	"Patrick Clancy; AI Data Centers; Shergar, Where are You?"	criminal justice; U.S. politics; technology	September 20, 2026	6.77
3	"Who needs humans?, The Thom Tillis Tightrope, Saint Francis in the Cloud"	AI; U.S. politics; art; technology	October 4, 2026	10.2
4	"In the Line of Fire,Lost Sheep,Jon Batiste"	U.S. government; security; Israel; Palestine; entertainment	October 11, 2026	6.06
5	"The Vote,Up in the Air,Sacha Baron Cohen"	U.S. elections; economy; entertainment	October 18, 2026	9.57
6	"Destination: Nowhere,#FreeTinaPeters,Australia's Experiment"	immigration enforcement; U.S. elections; social media	October 25, 2026	5.64
7	"Battleground,Cuba in Crisis,Wemby"	U.S. elections; Cuba; sport	November 1, 2026	10.41
8	"President Trump;France on Fire"	U.S. elections;France	November 8, 2026	7.8
9	"The Cost of War,Kratom,John Malkovich"	Iran;U.S. military;drug abuse;entertainment	November 15, 2026	N/A

== See also ==
- Battle of Tora Bora#Delta Force commander's account
- Betty Ford's August 1975 60 Minutes interview
- Brown & Williamson#60 Minutes
- "Inside CECOT"
- The Insider (film)
