= 60 Minutes =

American television news magazine program

- Genre: News magazine
- Created by: Don Hewitt
- Presented by: Lesley Stahl; Bill Whitaker; L. Jon Wertheim; Norah O'Donnell; Ross Douthat See § Correspondents
- Country of origin: United States
- Original language: English
- No. of seasons: 58
- No. of episodes: 2,500+ (list of episodes)

Production
- Executive producers: Don Hewitt (1968–2004); Jeff Fager (2004–2018); Bill Owens (2019–2025); Tanya Simon (2025–2026); Nick Bilton (2026–present)
- Camera setup: Multi-camera
- Running time: 60 minutes, including commercials
- Production company: CBS News Productions

Original release
- Network: CBS
- Release: September 24, 1968 – present

Related
- 60 Minutes (Australian TV program); 60 Minutes (New Zealand TV programme); 48 Hours; Face the Nation; CBS News Roundup

60 Minutes is an American television news magazine broadcast on the CBS television network. Debuting in 1968, the program was created by Don Hewitt and Bill Leonard, who distinguished it from other news programs by using a unique style of reporter-centered investigation. In 2002, 60 Minutes was ranked number six on TV Guide's list of the "50 Greatest TV Shows of All Time", and in 2013, it was ranked number 24 on the magazine's list of the "60 Best Series of All Time". In 2023, Variety ranked 60 Minutes as the twentieth-greatest TV show of all time. The New York Times has called it "one of the most esteemed news magazines on American television".

The program began in 1968 as a bi-weekly television show hosted by Mike Wallace and Harry Reasoner. The two sat on opposite sides of the cream-colored set, though the set's color was later changed to black, the color still in use. The show used a large stopwatch during transition periods and highlighted its topics through chroma key—both techniques are still used. In 1972, the program began airing from 6:00 p.m. to 7:00 p.m. Eastern time, although this time was sometimes disrupted by broadcasting of NFL games on Sundays. Since then, the show has generally kept the Sunday evening format, although the start time has occasionally been shifted. The program generally starts at 7:00 p.m. Eastern. If sports programming is airing that afternoon, 60 Minutes starts at 7:30 p.m. Eastern or at the game's conclusion.

The show is hosted by correspondents who do not share screen time with each other. Full-time hosts include Lesley Stahl, L. Jon Wertheim, Bill Whitaker, Ross Douthat and Norah O'Donnell. Several spinoffs have been made, including international formats of the show.

== Broadcast history ==
=== Early years ===
Since the show's inception in 1968, the opening of 60 Minutes features a stopwatch. The Aristo (Heuer) design first appeared in 1978. This version was used from 1992 to 2006 (the Eurostile type was changed in 1998).

External videos
- Panel discussion on the 30th anniversary of 60 Minutes at the Newseum, featuring Ed Bradley, Esther Hartigainer, Don Hewitt, Josh Howard, Steve Kroft, Mary Lieberthal, Andy Rooney, Morley Safer, Philip Scheffler, Lesley Stahl, and Mike Wallace

The program employed a magazine format similar to that of the Canadian program W5, which had premiered two years earlier. It pioneered many of the most important investigative journalism procedures and techniques, including re-editing interviews, hidden cameras, and "gotcha journalism" visits to the home or office of an investigative subject. Similar programs sprang up in Australia and Canada during the 1970s, as well as on local television news.

Initially, 60 Minutes aired as a bi-weekly show hosted by Mike Wallace and Harry Reasoner debuting on September 24, 1968, and alternating weeks with other CBS News productions on Tuesday evenings at 10:00 p.m. Eastern Time. The first edition, described by Reasoner in the opening as a "kind of a magazine for television," featured the following segments:

1. A look inside the headquarters suites of presidential candidates Richard Nixon and Hubert Humphrey during their respective parties' national conventions that summer;
2. Commentary by European writers Malcolm Muggeridge, Peter von Zahn, and Luigi Barzini Jr. on the American electoral system;
3. A commentary by political humor columnist Art Buchwald;
4. An interview with then-Attorney General Ramsey Clark about police brutality;
5. "A Digression," a brief, scripted piece in which two silhouetted men (one of them Andy Rooney) discuss the presidential campaign;
6. An abbreviated version of an Academy Award-winning short film by Saul Bass, Why Man Creates; and
7. A meditation by Wallace and Reasoner on the relation between perception and reality. Wallace said that the show aimed to "reflect reality".

The first "magazine-cover" chroma key was a photo of two helmeted policemen (for the Clark interview segment). Wallace and Reasoner sat in chairs on opposite sides of the set, which had a cream-colored backdrop; the more famous black backdrop (which is still used as of 2020) did not appear until the following year. The logo was in Helvetica type with the word "Minutes" spelled in all lower-case letters; the logo most associated with the show (rendered in Eurostile type with "Minutes" spelled in uppercase) did not appear until about 1974. Further, to extend the magazine motif, the producers added a "Vol. xx, No. xx" to the title display on the chroma key; modeled after the volume and issue number identifications featured in print magazines, this was used until about 1971. The trademark stopwatch, however, did not appear on the inaugural broadcast; it would not debut until several episodes later. Alpo dog food was the sole sponsor of the first program.

Don Hewitt, who had been a producer of the CBS Evening News with Walter Cronkite, sought out Wallace as a stylistic contrast to Reasoner. According to one historian of the show, the idea of the format was to make the hosts the reporters, to always feature stories that were of national importance but focused upon individuals involved with, or in conflict with, those issues, and to limit the reports' airtime to around 13 minutes. However, the initial season was troubled by lack of network confidence, as the program did not garner ratings much higher than that of other CBS News documentaries. As a rule, during that era, news programming during prime time lost money; networks mainly scheduled public affairs programs in prime time in order to bolster the prestige of their news departments, and thus boost ratings for the regular evening newscasts, which were seen by far more people than documentaries and the like. 60 Minutes struggled under that stigma during its first three years.

Changes to 60 Minutes came fairly early in the program's history. When Reasoner left CBS to co-anchor ABC's evening newscast (he would return to CBS and 60 Minutes in 1978), Morley Safer joined the team in 1970, and he took over Reasoner's duties of reporting less aggressive stories. However, when Richard Nixon began targeting press access and reporting, even Safer, formerly the CBS News bureau chief in Saigon and London, began to do "hard" investigative reports, and during the 1970–71 season alone, 60 Minutes reported on cluster bombs, the South Vietnamese Army, draft dodgers, Nigeria, the Middle East, and Northern Ireland.

=== Effects from the Prime Time Access Rule and later years ===
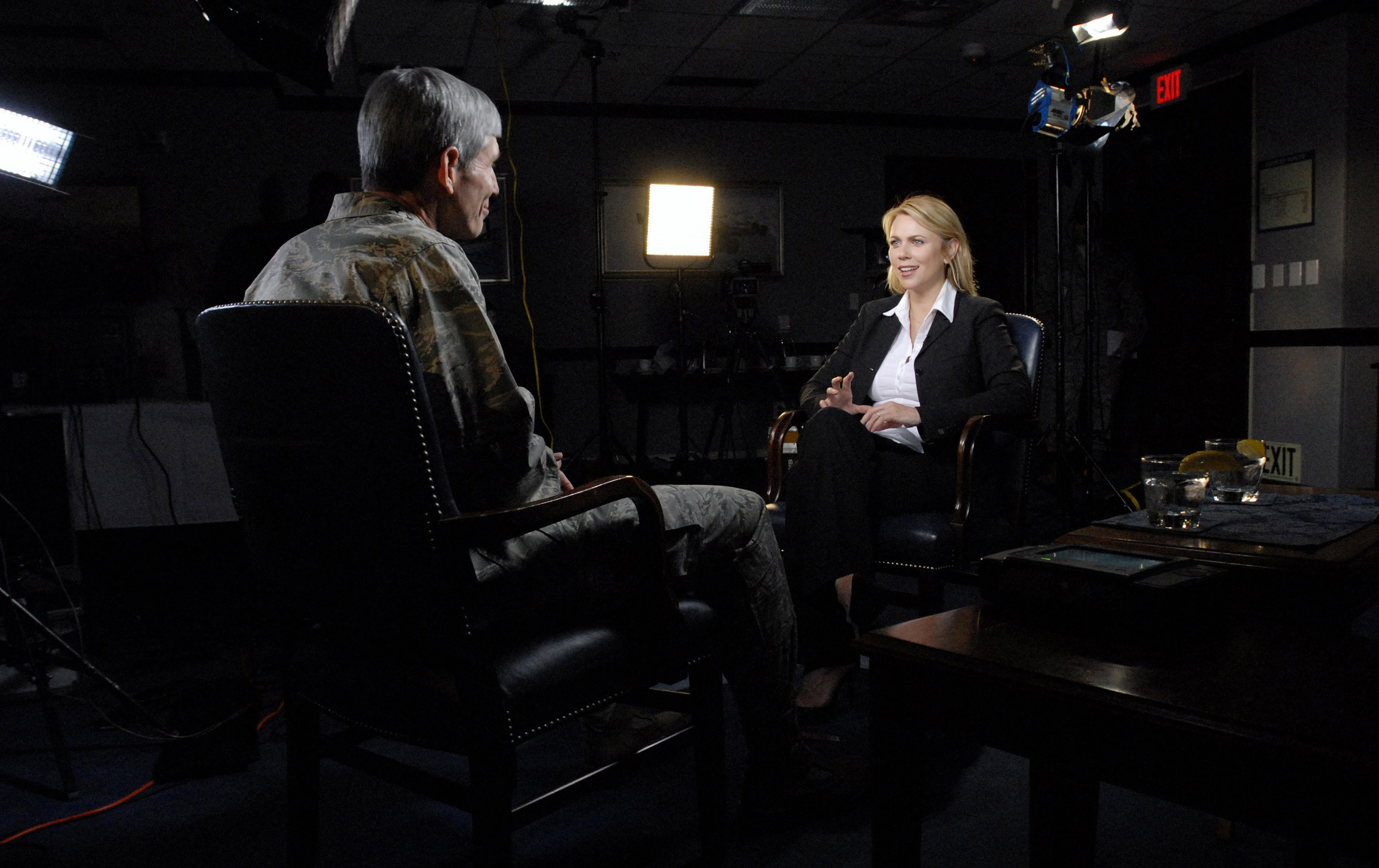
Air Force Chief of Staff Gen. Norton A. Schwartz in an interview with Lara Logan, April 15, 2009

By 1971, the Federal Communications Commission (FCC) introduced the Prime Time Access Rule, which freed local network affiliates in the top 50 markets (in practice, the entire network) to take a half-hour of prime time from the networks on Mondays through Saturdays and one full hour on Sundays. Because nearly all affiliates found production costs for the FCC's intended goal of increased public affairs programming very high and the ratings (and by association, advertising revenues) low, making it mostly unprofitable, the FCC created an exception for network-authored news and public affairs shows. After a six-month hiatus in late 1971, CBS found a prime place for 60 Minutes in a portion of that displaced time, 6:00 p.m. to 7:00 p.m. Eastern (5:00 p.m. to 6:00 p.m. Central Time) on Sundays in January 1972.

This proved somewhat less than satisfactory, however, because in order to accommodate CBS telecasts of late afternoon National Football League (NFL) games, 60 Minutes went on hiatus during the fall from 1972 to 1975 (and the summer of 1972). This took place because football telecasts were protected contractually from interruptions in the wake of the infamous "Heidi Bowl" incident on NBC in November 1968. Despite the irregular scheduling, the program's hard-hitting reports attracted a steadily growing audience, particularly during the waning days of the Vietnam War and the gripping events of the Watergate scandal; at that time, few if any other major network news shows did in-depth investigative reporting to the degree carried out by 60 Minutes. Eventually, during the summers of 1973 through 1975, CBS did allow the program back onto the prime time schedule proper, on Fridays in 1973 and Sundays the two years thereafter, as a replacement for programs aired during the regular television season.

It was only when the FCC returned an hour to the networks on Sundays (for news or family programming), which had been taken away from them four years earlier, in a 1975 amendment to the Access Rule, that CBS finally found a viable permanent timeslot for 60 Minutes. When the family-oriented drama Three for the Road ended after a 12-week run in the fall, the news magazine took its place at 7:00 p.m. Eastern Time (6:00 p.m. Central) on December 7, 1975, and has been aired at that time since then, making it not only the longest-running prime time program currently in production, but also the television program (excluding daily programs such as evening newscasts or morning news-talk shows) broadcasting for the longest length of time at a single time period each week in US television history.

This move, and the addition of then-White House correspondent Dan Rather to the reporting team, made the program into a strong ratings hit and, eventually, a general cultural phenomenon. This was no less than a stunning reversal of the historically poor ratings performances of documentary programs on network television. By 1976, 60 Minutes became the top-rated program on Sunday nights in the US. By 1979, it had achieved the #1 spot among all television programs in the Nielsen ratings, unheard of before for a news broadcast in prime time. This success translated into great profits for CBS; advertising rates increased from $17,000 per 30-second spot in 1975 to $175,000 in 1982.

The program sometimes does not start until after 7:00 p.m. Eastern, due largely to CBS Sports live sporting events. At the conclusion of an NFL game, 60 Minutes will air in its entirety and delay all subsequent programs. However, in the Pacific time zone, 60 Minutes is always able to start at its scheduled time as live sports coverage ends earlier in the afternoon. The program's success has also led CBS Sports to schedule events (such as the final round of the Masters Tournament and the PGA Championship and the second round and regional final games of the NCAA men's basketball tournament) leading into 60 Minutes and the rest of the network's primetime lineup for the night (as CBS never airs any sports programming on Sundays in primetime except for the AFC Divisional Round, AFC Championship Game, or the Super Bowl).

Starting in the 2012–2013 season, in order to accommodate a new NFL scheduling policy that the second game of a doubleheader start at 4:25 p.m., CBS changed the scheduled start time of 60 Minutes to 7:30 p.m. Eastern time (or game conclusion) for Eastern and Central Time Zone stations which are receiving a game in that window. The start time remains at 7:00 p.m. Eastern/Pacific (or game conclusion if a late single game is airing in the eastern markets) on stations which are not broadcasting a late game in a given week (or for Western time zones even if a doubleheader airs). Since the 2023–2024 season, the show began to have occasional 90-minute episodes.

=== Radio broadcast and Internet distribution ===
60 Minutes is also simulcast on several former CBS Radio flagship stations. WBBM in Chicago, KRLD in Dallas, WWJ in Detroit, KNX in Los Angeles, KYW in Philadelphia, KCBS in San Francisco (all owned by Audacy) and WBZ in Boston (owned by iHeartMedia). Anchorage-based station KFQD airs 60 Minutes as part of its affiliation with local CBS station KAUU. When it airs locally on their sister CBS Television Network affiliate, even in the Central and Eastern time zones, the show is aired at the top of the hour at 7:00 p.m./6:00 p.m. Central (barring local sports play-by-play pre-emptions and breaking news coverage) no matter how long the show is delayed on CBS Television, resulting in radio listeners often hearing the show on those stations ahead of the television broadcast. An audio version of each broadcast without advertising began to be distributed via podcast and the iTunes Store, starting with the broadcast on September 23, 2007. Video from 60 Minutes (including full episodes) is also made available for streaming several hours after the program's initial broadcast on CBSNews.com and Paramount+.

== Format ==
60 Minutes normally has three long-form news stories without superimposed graphics. There is a commercial break between two stories. Each story is introduced from a set featuring a large screen displaying a graphic designed to resemble a magazine story on the topic. The program undertakes its own investigations and follows up on investigations instigated by national newspapers and other sources. Unlike its competitor 20/20, as well as traditional local and national news programs, the 60 Minutes journalists never share the screen with (or speak to) other 60 Minutes journalists on camera at any time. This creates a strong psychological sense of intimacy between the journalist and television viewers.

=== Reporting tone ===
60 Minutes blends the journalism of the seminal 1950s CBS series See It Now with Edward R. Murrow (for which Hewitt served as director in its first years) and the personality profiles of another Murrow program, Person to Person. In Hewitt's words, 60 Minutes blends "higher Murrow" and "lower Murrow".

=== Point/Counterpoint segment ===
For most of the 1970s, the program included Point/Counterpoint, in which a liberal and conservative commentator debated an issue. This segment originally featured James J. Kilpatrick representing the conservative side and Nicholas von Hoffman for the liberal, with Shana Alexander taking over for von Hoffman after he departed in 1974. The segment was an innovation that caught the public imagination as live versions of competing editorials. In 1979, Alexander asked Hewitt to raise the $350 per week pay; Hewitt declined, and the segment ended.

Point/Counterpoint was lampooned by the NBC comedy series Saturday Night Live, which featured Jane Curtin and Dan Aykroyd as TV news reporters. Their segment featured a debate in comically complete abandonment of rhetorical decorum, with Aykroyd announcing the topic, Curtin making an opening statement, then Aykroyd typically retorting with ad hominem attacks, such as "Jane, you ignorant slut" and Curtin responding "Dan, you pompous ass", in the film Airplane! (1980), in which the faux Kilpatrick argues in favor of the plane crashing, stating "they bought their tickets, they knew what they were getting into", and an earlier sketch comedy film, The Kentucky Fried Movie, where the segment was called Count/Pointercount.

A similar concept was revived briefly in March 2003 featuring Bob Dole and Bill Clinton, former opponents in the 1996 presidential election. The pair agreed to do ten segments (titled Clinton/Dole and Dole/Clinton in alternating weeks), but these did not continue into the 2003–2004 fall season. Reports indicated that the segments were considered too gentlemanly, in the style of the earlier Point/Counterpoint, and lacked the feistiness of Crossfire.

=== Andy Rooney segment ===
From 1978 to 2011, the program usually ended with (usually light-hearted and humorous) commentary by Andy Rooney expounding on topics of wildly varying importance, ranging from international politics, to economics, and his personal philosophy on everyday life. One recurring topic was measuring the amount of coffee in coffee cans.

Rooney's pieces, particularly one in which he referred to actor Mel Gibson as a "wacko", on occasion led to complaints from viewers. In 1990, Rooney was suspended without pay for three months by then-CBS News President David Burke, because of the negative publicity around his saying that "too much alcohol, too much food, drugs, homosexual unions, cigarettes [are] all known to lead to premature death." He wrote an explanatory letter to a gay organization after being ordered not to do so. After four weeks without Rooney, 60 Minutes lost 20% of its audience. CBS management concluded that it was in their best interest to have Rooney return immediately.

Rooney published several books documenting his contributions to the program, including Years of Minutes and A Few Minutes with Andy Rooney. Rooney retired from 60 Minutes, delivering his final commentary on October 2, 2011; it was his 1,097th commentary over his 34-year career on the program. He died one month later on November 4, 2011. On November 13, 2011, 60 Minutes featured an hour-long tribute to Rooney and his career and included a rebroadcast of his final commentary segment.

=== Opening sequence ===
The show's current intertitle since October 29, 2006.

The opening sequence features a 60 Minutes "magazine cover" with the show's trademark, an Aristo stopwatch, intercut with preview clips of the episode's stories. The sequence ends with each of the correspondents and hosts introducing themselves. The last host who appears then says, "Those stories tonight on 60 Minutes". When Rooney was a prominent fixture, the final line was "Those stories and Andy Rooney, tonight on 60 Minutes". Before that, and whenever Rooney did not appear, the final line was "Those stories and more, tonight on 60 Minutes".

The stopwatch counts off each of the broadcast's 60 minutes, starting from zero at the beginning of each show. It is seen during the opening title sequence, before each commercial break, and at the tail-end of the closing credits, and each time it appears it displays (within reasonable accuracy) the elapsed time of the episode to that point.

On October 29, 2006, the opening sequence changed from a black background, which had been used for over a decade, to white. Also, the gray background for the Aristo stopwatch in the "cover" changed to red, the color for the title text changed to white, and the stopwatch itself changed from the diagonal position it had been oriented in for 31 years to an upright position.

=== Web content ===
Videos and transcripts of 60 Minutes editions, as well as clips that were not included in the broadcast are available on the program's website. In September 2010, the program launched a website called "60 Minutes Overtime", in which stories broadcast on-air are discussed in further detail. Previously the show had a partnership with Yahoo! for distribution of extra content.

== Correspondents and hosts ==
=== Correspondents and commentators ===
Hosts

- Lesley Stahl (1991–)
- Bill Whitaker (2014–)
- L. Jon Wertheim (2017–)
- Norah O'Donnell (part-time correspondent, 2015–2026; host, 2026–)
- Ross Douthat (2026-)

Part-time correspondents

- Jonathan LaPook (medical correspondent; 2013–)
- Matt Gutman (2026–)
- Sebastian Junger (2026-)
- Ariel Levy (2026-)
- Trevor Phillips (2026-)
- Gianna Toboni (2026-)

=== Former correspondents and hosts ===
Former hosts

- Harry Reasoner (host, 1968–1970, 1978–1991)
- Dan Rather (part-time correspondent, 1968–1975; host, 1975–1981 and 2005–2006)
- Mike Wallace (host, 1968–2006; correspondent emeritus 2006–2008)
- Morley Safer (part-time correspondent, 1968–1970; host, 1970–2016)
- Ed Bradley (part-time correspondent, 1976–1981; host, 1981–2006)
- Diane Sawyer (part-time correspondent, 1981–1984; host, 1984–1989) (at ABC News since)
- Steve Kroft (host, 1989–2019; co-editor, 2019) (retired)
- Christiane Amanpour (part-time correspondent, 1996–2000; host, 2000–2005)
- Scott Pelley (host, 2003–2026)
- Lara Logan (part-time correspondent, 2005–2012; host, 2012–2018)
- Anderson Cooper (host, 2006–2026) (also at CNN)
- Sharyn Alfonsi (host, 2015–2026)
- Cecilia Vega (host, 2023–2026)

Former part-time correspondents

- Eric Sevareid (1968–1969)
- Charles Kuralt (1968–1979)
- Roger Mudd (1968–1980)
- Walter Cronkite (1968–1981)
- Bill Plante (1968–1995)
- John Hart (1969–1975) (retired)
- Bob Schieffer (1973–1996)
- Morton Dean (1975–1979) (retired)
- Marlene Sanders (1978–1987)
- Charles Osgood (1981–1994)
- Meredith Vieira (part-time correspondent, 1982–1985 and 1991–1993; host, 1990–1991)
- Forrest Sawyer (1985–1987)
- Connie Chung (1990–1993) (retired)
- Paula Zahn (1990–1999)
- John Roberts (1992–2005) (at Fox News Channel since)
- Russ Mitchell (1995–1998) (at WKYC in Cleveland since)
- Bob Simon (1996–2015)
- Carol Marin (1997–2002)
- Vicki Mabrey (1999–2005)
- Katie Couric (2006–2011)
- Charlie Rose (2008–2017)
- Byron Pitts (2009–2013) (at ABC News since)
- Sanjay Gupta (2011–2014) (at CNN since)
- Alison Stewart (2012)
- Clarissa Ward (2012–2015) (at CNN since)
- Oprah Winfrey (2017–2018)
- John Dickerson (2019–2021)

=== Commentators ===
Commentators for 60 Minutes have included:

- James J. Kilpatrick (conservative debater, 1971–1979)
- Nicholas von Hoffman (liberal debater, 1971–1974)
- Shana Alexander (liberal debater, 1975–1979)
- Andy Rooney (commentator, 1978–2011)
- Stanley Crouch (conservative commentator, 1996)
- Molly Ivins (liberal commentator, 1996)
- P. J. O'Rourke (conservative commentator, 1996)
- Jimmy Tingle (humorist/commentator, 1999–2000)
- Bill Clinton (liberal debater, 2003)
- Bob Dole (conservative debater, 2003)

== Producers ==
Executive producers

- Don Hewitt (1968–2004)
- Jeff Fager (2004–2018)
- Bill Owens (2019–2025)
- Tanya Simon (2025–2026)
- Nick Bilton (2026–present)

Other producers

- Madeline Amgott
- Joel Bach
- Lowell Bergman
- Frank Braun
- Robert Chandler
- Adam Ciralsky
- Leslie Cockburn
- George Crile III
- Katherine Davis
- Shawn Efran
- Solly Granatstein
- Jim Hougan
- Neeraj Khemlani
- Jon Klein
- Peter W. Klein
- Andrew Lack
- Barry Lando
- Charles Lewis
- Lucy Spiegel
- Mary Mapes
- Jim Margolis
- Abigail Pogrebin
- Richard S. Salant
- Patricia Shevlin
- Charlene Leonora Smith
- Sanford Socolow
- Mary Ellen Synon
- Adrian Taylor
- Len Tepper
- Al Wasserman
- Joseph Wershba
- Holly Williams
- Palmer Williams
- Nieves Zuberbühler

== Ratings and recognition ==
=== Nielsen ratings ===
Based on viewership ratings, 60 Minutes is the most successful program in American television history since it was moved into its present timeslot in 1975. For five seasons it was the year's top program, a feat matched by the sitcoms All in the Family and The Cosby Show, and surpassed only by the reality competition series American Idol, which had been the #1 show for eight consecutive seasons from the 2003–2004 television season up to the 2010–2011 season. 60 Minutes was a top ten show for 23 seasons in a row (1977–2000), an unsurpassed record, and has made the Top 20 for every season since the 1976–1977 season, except from 2005 to 2008.

60 Minutes first broke into the Nielsen Top 20 during the 1976–77 season. The following season, it was the fourth-most-watched program, and by the 1979–80 season, it was the number one show. During the 21st century, it remained among the top 20 programs in the Nielsen ratings, and the highest-rated news magazine.

On November 16, 2008, the edition featuring an interview with President-elect Barack Obama, earned a total viewership of 25.1 million viewers.

On October 6, 2013, the broadcast (which was delayed by 44 minutes that evening due to a Denver Broncos–Dallas Cowboys NFL game) drew 17.94 million viewers; retaining 63% of the 28.32 million viewers of its lead-in, and making it the most watched 60 Minutes broadcast since December 16, 2012.

On December 1, 2013, the broadcast (delayed 50 minutes due to a Broncos–Kansas City Chiefs game) was watched by 18.09 million viewers, retaining 66% of its NFL lead-in (which earned 28.11 million viewers during the 7:00 p.m. hour).

On March 25, 2018, the edition featuring Stormy Daniels giving details on her alleged affair with President Donald Trump drew 22.1 million viewers, the most since the 2008 Obama interview. The broadcast was delayed due to the NCAA men's basketball regional final on CBS between Kansas and Duke going to overtime.

=== Recognition ===
==== Emmy Awards ====
As of June 26, 2017, 60 Minutes had won a total of 138 Emmy Awards, a record for American primetime programs.

==== Peabody Awards ====
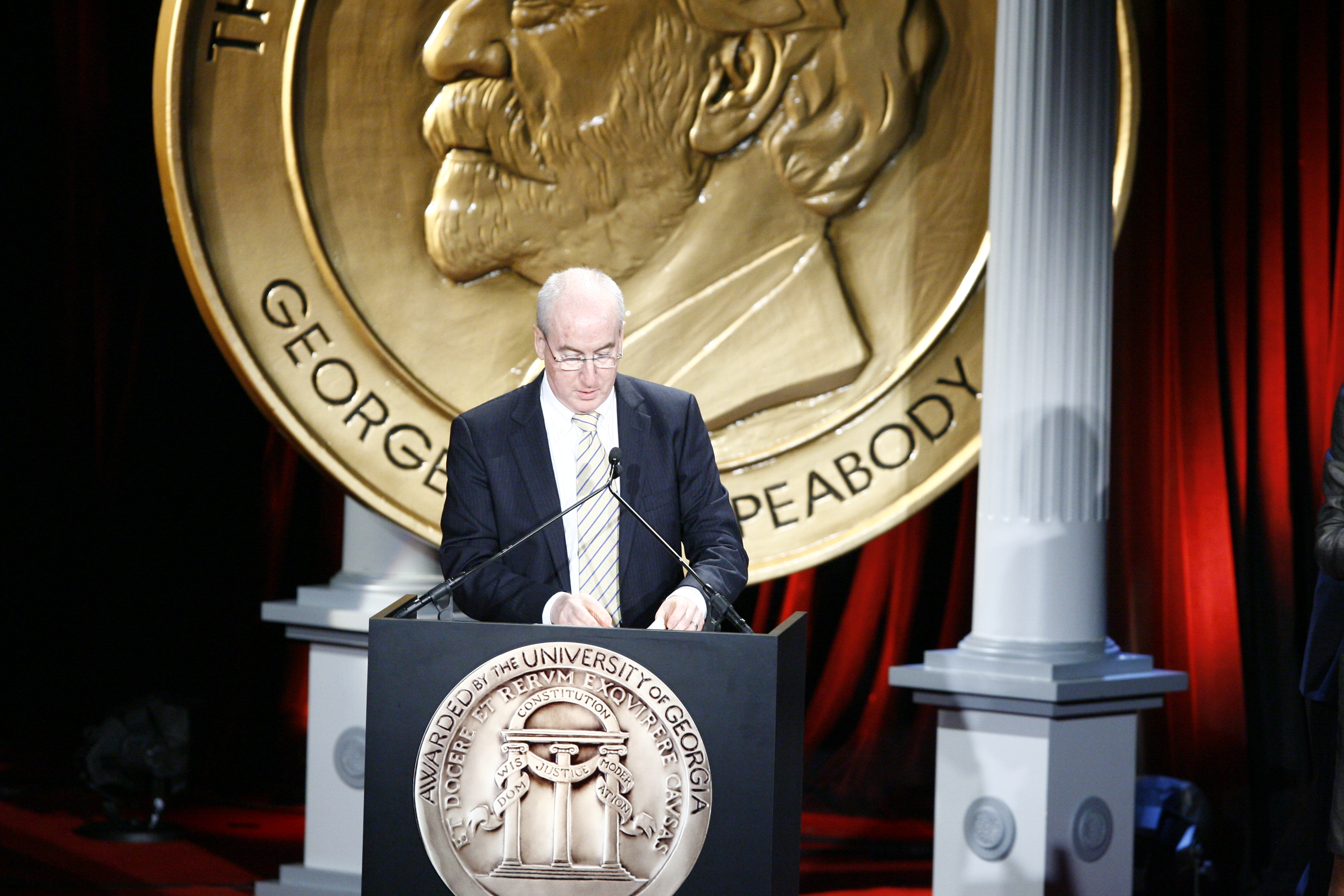
Henry Schuster at the 68th Annual Peabody Awards for 60 Minutes-Lifeline

The program has won 20 Peabody Awards for segments including "All in the Family", an investigation into abuses by government and military contractors; "The CIA's Cocaine", which uncovered CIA involvement in drug smuggling, "Friendly Fire", a report on incidents of friendly fire in the Gulf War; "The Duke Rape Case", an investigation into accusations of rape at an off campus lacrosse team party in 2006; and "The Killings in Haditha", an investigation into the killing of Iraqi civilians by U.S. Marines.

==== Other awards ====
The show received an Investigative Reporter and Editor medal for their segment "The Osprey", documenting a Marine cover-up of deadly flaws in the V-22 Osprey aircraft.

==== Exoneration ====
In 1983, a report by Morley Safer, "Lenell Geter's in Jail", helped exonerate a Texas man who was wrongly convicted and imprisoned for armed robbery.

=== Longest-running primetime show ===
As of 2021, 60 Minutes is the longest continuously running program of any genre scheduled during American network prime time. It has aired at 7:00 p.m. Eastern Time on Sundays since December 7, 1975 (although since 2012, it moves to 7:30 p.m. Eastern Time on Sundays if CBS has a late NFL game).

Meet the Press debuted in 1947 in prime time, but it has been a daytime program since 1965. The Walt Disney anthology television series, which premiered in 1954, and the Hallmark Hall of Fame, which has aired since 1951, have aired longer than 60 Minutes, but none of them has aired in prime time continually.

== Controversies ==
The show has been praised for landmark journalism and received many awards. However, it has also become embroiled in some controversy, including (in order of appearance):

=== Audi unintended acceleration ===
On November 23, 1986, 60 Minutes aired a segment greenlit by Hewitt, concerning the Audi 5000 automobile, a popular German luxury car. The story covered a supposed problem of "unintended acceleration" when the brake pedal was pushed, with emotional interviews with six people who sued Audi (unsuccessfully) after they crashed their cars, including one woman whose six-year-old son had been killed. In the 60 Minutes segment footage was shown of an Audi 5000 with the accelerator "moving down on its own", accelerating the car. It later emerged that an expert witness employed by one of the plaintiffs modified the accelerator with a concealed device, causing the "unintended acceleration". Independent investigators concluded that this "unintended acceleration" was most likely due to driver error, where the driver let their foot slip off the brake and onto the accelerator. Tests by Audi and independent journalists showed that even with the throttle wide open, the car would simply stall if the brakes were actually being used.

The incident devastated Audi sales in the United States, which did not rebound for 15 years. The initial incidents which prompted the report were found by the National Highway Traffic Safety Administration and Transport Canada to have been attributable to operator error, where car owners had depressed the accelerator pedal instead of the brake pedal. CBS issued a partial retraction, without acknowledging the test results of involved government agencies. Years later, Dateline NBC, a rival to 60 Minutes, was found guilty of similar tactics regarding the fuel tank integrity of General Motors pickup trucks.

=== Jeep rollovers ===
A segment aired in December, 1980, concerning the alleged Jeep CJ-5 high rollover risk as demonstrated in Insurance Institute for Highway Safety testing. The demonstration was a Jeep rolling over during an extreme turn at 20 mph (32 km/h), something that would not cause other cars to roll over. It was deemed by 60 Minutes reporters as the "most dangerous thing on four wheels". After the show aired, many people were concerned about the safety of the vehicle, and following sales plummeted. This tarnished the reputation of the Jeep CJ; the model was discontinued in 1986. Years after the incident occurred, it was found that the Insurance Institute for Highway Safety had attempted to roll the car 435 times, only having 8 rollovers. The show had also failed to mention/show that there were weights hanging on spots of the vehicle that had caused the vehicle to have a higher rollover risk.

=== Alar ===
In February 1989, 60 Minutes aired a report by the Natural Resources Defense Council claiming that the use of daminozide (Alar) on apples presented an unacceptably high health risk to consumers. Apple sales dropped and CBS was sued unsuccessfully by apple growers. Alar was subsequently banned for use on food crops in the U.S. by the Environmental Protection Agency (EPA).

=== Werner Erhard ===
On March 3, 1991, 60 Minutes broadcast "Werner Erhard," which dealt with controversies involving Erhard's personal and business life. A year after the 60 Minutes piece aired, Erhard filed a lawsuit against CBS, claiming that the broadcast contained several "false, misleading and defamatory" statements about him. One month after filing the lawsuit, Erhard filed for dismissal. Erhard later told Larry King in an interview that he dropped the suit after receiving legal advice telling him that in order to win it, he had to prove not only that CBS knew the allegations were false but also that CBS acted with malice. After numerous independent journalists exposed untruths and factual inaccuracies in the story the segment was removed by CBS from its archives, with a disclaimer: "This segment has been deleted at the request of CBS News for legal or copyright reasons."

=== Brown & Williamson ===
In 1995, former Brown & Williamson Vice President for Research and Development Jeffrey Wigand provided information to 60 Minutes producer Lowell Bergman pertaining to B&W having systematically hidden the health risks of their cigarettes. Furthermore, it was alleged that B&W had introduced foreign agents (such as fiberglass and ammonia) with the intent of enhancing the effect of nicotine. Bergman began to produce a piece based upon the information, but ran into opposition from Don Hewitt who, along with CBS lawyers, feared a billion-dollar lawsuit from Brown and Williamson for tortious interference for encouraging Wigand to violate his non-disclosure agreement. A number of people at CBS would benefit from a sale of CBS to Westinghouse Electric Corporation, including the head of CBS lawyers and CBS News. Also, because of the interview, the son of CBS President Laurence Tisch (who also controlled Lorillard Tobacco) was among the people from the big tobacco companies at risk of being caught having committed perjury. Due to Hewitt's hesitation, The Wall Street Journal instead broke Wigand's story. The 60 Minutes piece was eventually aired with substantially altered content and minus some of the most damning evidence against B&W. The exposé of the incident was published in an article in Vanity Fair by Marie Brenner, entitled "The Man Who Knew Too Much".

The New York Times wrote that "the traditions of Edward R. Murrow and '60 Minutes' itself were diluted in the process," though the newspaper revised the quote slightly, suggesting that 60 Minutes and CBS had "betrayed the legacy of Edward R. Murrow". The incident was turned into a seven-times Oscar-nominated feature film entitled The Insider, directed by Michael Mann and starring Russell Crowe as Wigand, Al Pacino as Bergman, and Christopher Plummer as Mike Wallace. Wallace denounced the portrayal of him as inaccurate to his stance on the issue.

=== U.S. Customs Service ===
In 1997, 60 Minutes alleged that agents of the U.S. Customs Service ignored drug trafficking across the Mexico–United States border at San Diego. The only evidence was a memorandum apparently written by Rudy Camacho, who was the head of the San Diego branch office. Based on this memo, CBS alleged that Camacho had allowed trucks belonging to a particular firm to cross the border unimpeded. Mike Horner, a former Customs Service employee, had passed the memos on to 60 Minutes, and even provided a copy with an official stamp. Camacho was not consulted about the piece, and his career was devastated in the immediate term as his own department placed suspicion on him. In the end, it turned out that Horner had forged the documents as an act of revenge for his treatment within the Customs Service. Camacho sued CBS and settled for an undisclosed amount of money in damages. 60 Minutes founder Don Hewitt was forced to issue an on-air retraction.

=== Kennewick Man ===
A legal battle between archaeologists and the Umatilla tribe over the remains of a skeleton, nicknamed Kennewick Man, was reported by 60 Minutes on October 25, 1998, to which the Umatilla tribe reacted negatively. The tribe considered the segment heavily biased in favor of the scientists, cutting out important arguments, such as explanations of the Native American Graves Protection and Repatriation Act. The report focused heavily on the racial politics of the controversy and also added inflammatory arguments, such as questioning the legitimacy of Native American sovereignty—much of the racial focus of the segment was later reported to have been either unfounded and/or misinterpreted.

=== Timothy McVeigh ===
On March 12, 2000, 60 Minutes aired an interview with Oklahoma City bomber Timothy McVeigh. At the time, McVeigh had already been convicted and sentenced to death for the bombing of the Alfred P. Murrah Federal Building in April 1995, and the subsequent deaths of 168 people. On the program, McVeigh was given the opportunity to vent against the government. Following the program, a federal policy called the Special Confinement Unit Media Policy was enacted prohibiting face-to-face interviews with death row inmates. A federal inmate challenged the policy in Hammer v. Ashcroft, under which the U.S. Court of Appeals for the Seventh Circuit upheld the prison policy. In March 2010, the United States Supreme Court declined to hear an appeal in the case, and the policy limiting media access to death row inmates remains in place. CBS refuses to show the entire interview, and has stated no reasons.

=== Killian documents controversy ===
The Killian documents controversy involved six documents critical of George W. Bush's service in the Texas Air National Guard from 1972 to 1973. Four of these documents were presented as authentic in a 60 Minutes II episode aired on September 8, 2004, less than two months before the 2004 presidential election, but it was later found that CBS had failed to authenticate the documents. Subsequently, several typewriter and typography experts concluded the documents are forgeries, as have some media sources. No forensic document examiners or typography experts authenticated the documents, which may not be possible without original documents. The provider of the documents, Lt. Col. Bill Burkett, claimed to have burned the originals after faxing copies to CBS. The incident was dramatized for the feature-length film, Truth.

=== "The Internet Is Infected" episode and the false hacker photo ===
On March 29, 2009, a segment titled "The Internet Is Infected" aired on 60 Minutes, which featured an interview with Don Jackson, a data protection professional for SecureWorks. Jackson himself declared in the program that "a part of [his] job is to know the enemy". However, during the interview, Jackson showed a photo of Finnish upper-level comprehensive school pupils and misidentified them as Russian hackers. In the photo, one of the children wears a jacket with the coat of arms of Finland on it. Another one wears a cap which clearly has the logo of Karjala, a Finnish brand of beer, on it. The principal of the school in Taivalkoski confirmed that the photo was taken at the school about five years before the program was broadcast.

The photo's exact origins are unknown, but it is widely known in Finland, having been originally posted to the Finnish social networking site IRC-Galleria in the early 2000s. It spread all over Finnish internet communities, and even originated a couple of patriotically titled (but intentionally misspelled) mock sites. 60 Minutes later issued a correction and on-air apology.

=== Benghazi report ===
After the 2012 Benghazi attack, 60 Minutes aired a report by correspondent Lara Logan on October 27, 2013, in which British military contractor Dylan Davies, identified by CBS under the pseudonym "Morgan Jones", described racing to the Benghazi compound several hours after the main assault was over, scaling a 12-foot wall and knocking out a lone fighter with the butt of a rifle. He also claimed to have visited a Benghazi hospital earlier that night where he saw Ambassador Christopher Stevens' body.

In the days following the report, Davies' personal actions were challenged. The FBI, which had interviewed Davies several times and considered him a credible source, said the account Davies had given them was different from what he told 60 Minutes. Davies stood by his story, but the inconsistency ultimately prompted 60 Minutes to conclude it was a mistake to include Davies in their report. The show issued a correction.

After the correction, a journalistic review was conducted by Al Ortiz, CBS News' executive director of standards and practices. Ortiz determined that red flags about Davies' account were missed. Davies had told the program and written in his book that he told an alternative version of his actions to his employer, who he said had demanded that he stay inside his Benghazi villa as the attack unfolded. That alternative version was shared with U.S. authorities; 60 Minutes was unable to prove the story Davies had told them was true.

Davies' book, The Embassy House, was published two days after the 60 Minutes report, by Threshold Editions, part of the Simon and Schuster unit of CBS. It was pulled from shelves once 60 Minutes issued its correction.

On November 26, 2013, Logan was forced to take a leave of absence due to the errors in the Benghazi report. Logan returned to work months later.

=== NSA report ===
On December 15, 2013, 60 Minutes aired a report on the workings of the National Security Agency (NSA) that was widely criticized as misleading and a biased "puff piece". Complaints included that the Agency's perspective was presented unchallenged and that privacy campaigners were not invited to present the counter-arguments to the Agency's claims. These claims included NSA denials of "potentially extralegal" data collection. The story was reported by John Miller, who once worked in the office of the Director of National Intelligence.

=== Tesla automaker report ===
On March 30, 2014, 60 Minutes presented a story on the Tesla Model S luxury electric automobile, with Scott Pelley conducting an interview with CEO Elon Musk concerning the car brand as well as his company SpaceX. Within a day, the automotive blog site Jalopnik reported that the sounds accompanying footage of the car shown during the story were actually sounds from a traditional gasoline engine dubbed over the footage, when in reality the electric car makes no such sounds. CBS released a statement explaining that the sound was the result of an audio editing error, and subsequently removed the sound from the online version of the piece. However, several news outlets, as well as Jalopnik itself, expressed doubt over the authenticity of this explanation, noting the similar scandal involving Tesla Motors and the New York Times in 2013.

=== Sexual harassment ===
After the resignation of CBS news head Les Moonves, an investigation into sexual harassment at CBS, including 60 Minutes, uncovered evidence of long-running sexual harassment issues stemming from behavior of producers Jeff Fager and Don Hewitt.

=== Florida COVID-19 vaccine rollout ===
In April 2021, Sharyn Alfonsi's story in 60 Minutes on Florida Governor Ron DeSantis and the state's COVID-19 vaccine rollout faced criticism for suggesting that a donation by the supermarket chain Publix to DeSantis' re-election campaign influenced Florida's partnership with Publix stores for vaccine distribution. Subsequently, Palm Beach County Mayor Dave Kerner accused 60 Minutes of reporting "intentionally false" information, while Karol Markowicz of the New York Post characterized Alfonsi as coming off as a "political activist" in the segment. A spokesperson for 60 Minutes defended the story for having included DeSantis' response to the accusation. PolitiFact stated that by omitting DeSantis' remarks on why the state partnered with Publix to distribute vaccines, the clip could be considered to be "deceptive editing".

=== Facial recognition report ===
On May 16, 2021, Anderson Cooper's story in 60 Minutes on the flaws in facial recognition technology used by the police resulting in incorrect identification of people of color received backlash for denying credit to the black female researchers who pioneered the field. The segment was criticized by the Algorithmic Justice League for "deliberately excluding the groundbreaking and award-winning work of prominent black women AI researchers Joy Buolamwini, Dr. Timnit Gebru, and Inioluwa Deborah Raji". The segment was called out for its hypocrisy for failing to credit black women for their pioneering work in a segment highlighting how facial recognition software often leaves out black, Asian, and female faces. CBS later issued a statement explaining that these researchers were not included due to time restrictions of the segment.

=== "Deceptive editing" lawsuit ===
On December 7, 2024, Donald Trump filed a $20 billion lawsuit against CBS and its parent company, Paramount Global, alleging that the network deceptively edited an interview with Vice President Kamala Harris on 60 Minutes to sway public opinion in her favor. The lawsuit, submitted in the lead-up to the 2024 presidential election, claims that the editing distorted Harris's response regarding Middle East policy. Both parties agreed to enter mediation, coinciding with a planned $8 billion merger between Paramount and Skydance, which requires approval from the Federal Communications Commission (FCC). Within Paramount, there was reportedly internal disagreement over whether to settle the dispute, as the producers of 60 Minutes maintained their conduct was appropriate and opposed offering an apology. In early April 2025, Trump expressed his "hope" that the FCC would punish CBS for running on 60 Minutes stories on Ukraine and Greenland that he disapproved of. Trump filed a lawsuit in Texas accusing CBS of violating the state's Deceptive Trade Practices Act, a consumer protection law.

On April 22, 2025, Bill Owens resigned as the show's executive producer, telling staff he believed he no longer had journalistic independence. He said in a memo that the show would continue to cover the second Trump administration the same way it has covered others. Some said that if the lawsuit by Trump is settled, it would "continue a trend" of institutions giving "in to his demands to avoid punishments such as losing federal funding or access to federal buildings." Others reported that while the show's staff was "shaken" by the departure of Owens, no one else was expected to resign because it "would be seen as giving in to Trump," with executive editor Tanya Simon, daughter of Bob Simon, beginning to run the show "on an interim basis," following the resignation of Owens.

In the "Last Minute" segment of the show on April 27, 2025, Scott Pelley praised Owens for ensuring that the types of controversial stories the show had covered since its creation, most recently the Gaza war and the Trump administration, were covered fairly. However, he claimed that recent changes, namely increased supervision—but not censorship—of the show's content by Paramount due to its desire to complete their merger, had led Owens to feel that he "lost the independence that honest journalism requires." Pelley concluded this public rebuke of the network's owner by stating that Owens proved to be the "right person" leading the show "all along."

On May 19, 2025, CBS News chief executive Wendy McMahon followed Bill Owens in resigning. McMahon explained in a memo to staff, “The past few months have been challenging. It's become clear that the company and I do not agree on the path forward.” On July 2, 2025, Paramount agreed to a $16 million settlement. As part of the deal, the company did not apologize or admit wrongdoing, agreed to release full transcripts of interviews with future U.S. presidential candidates after they air, and stated that the funds will go to Trump's future presidential library.

=== Postponed CECOT story ===
On December 21, 2025, CBS News abruptly pulled a planned segment on El Salvador's Terrorism Confinement Center (CECOT) and President Trump's deportation of Venezuelan migrants from that night's episode, and announced that it would be postponed to a future date. Correspondent Sharyn Alfonsi accused Bari Weiss—who had recently been named editor-in-chief of CBS News—of intervening for political reasons, despite the segment having been cleared by the network's staff. On December 22, Canadian broadcaster Global accidentally made the original cut of the episode containing the CECOT story available on its video on demand platform, causing it to be widely disseminated online.

Weiss claimed that the story "was not ready" for broadcast; sources within CBS News told outlets including the New York Times that two days before the anticipated broadcast, Weiss had asked the producers to arrange an interview with Trump administration operative Stephen Miller, who architected the deportation policy, or an administration operative of similar rank. Alfonsi stated in a email memorandum to colleagues that the production team did request comments and interviews from White House officials, the State Department, and the Department of Homeland Security, which were all refused.

On January 18, 2026, the segment aired alongside a piece on the relations between Minneapolis citizens and ICE officers after the death of Renée Good.

=== Firing of Scott Pelley ===
Correspondent Scott Pelley was fired in June 2026. He complained about management, including CBS News Chief Bari Weiss, and the incoming executive-producer of the show, Nick Bilton.

== Spin-offs ==
The main 60 Minutes show has created a number of spin-offs over the years.

=== 30 Minutes ===
30 Minutes was a news magazine aimed at children that was patterned after 60 Minutes, airing as the final program in CBS's Saturday morning lineup from 1978 to 1982. It was hosted by Christopher Glenn (who also served as the voice-over for the interstitial program In the News and was an anchor on the CBS Radio Network), along with Betsy Aaron (1978–1980) and Betty Ann Bowser (1980–1982).

=== 60 Minutes More ===
60 Minutes More was a spin-off that ran for one season from March 31, 1997, on the channel CBS Eye on People. The episodes featured popular stories from the past that were expanded with updates on the original story.

=== 60 Minutes II ===
On January 13, 1999, CBS premiered a new Wednesday-night edition of 60 Minutes known as 60 Minutes II.

In May 2004, it was announced that the show would be retitled to simply 60 Minutes (or alternatively 60 Minutes Wednesday) during the upcoming season; CBS News president Andrew Heyward felt that the "II" branding had falsely implied a "watered-down version" of the show (some CBS employees had internally called the show 60 Minutes Jr. before its premiere) rather than a high-quality program in the tradition of the long-running Sunday edition.

In September 2004, the program was marred by controversy when it aired a report alleging that presidential candidate George W. Bush had previously been suspended from the Texas Air National Guard as unfit for duty; the claims were found to have been based on falsified documents received by the show's staff.

The show later moved to Friday nights in July 2005 (rebranding back to 60 Minutes II), and aired its final episode on September 2, 2005.

=== 60 Minutes on CNBC ===
In 2011, CNBC began airing a 60 Minutes spin-off of its own, called 60 Minutes on CNBC. Hosted by Lesley Stahl and Steve Kroft, it aired updated business-related reports seen on the original broadcasts and offers footage that was not included when the segments first aired. It ended in 2015.

=== 60 Minutes Sports ===
In 2013, CBS's sister premium television network Showtime premiered 60 Minutes Sports, a monthly spin-off focused on sports-related stories and classic interviews from the show's archives. Personalities from CBS Sports also contributed to the program; correspondents included Sharyn Alfonsi and Armen Keteyian. The spin-off was considered a competitor to HBO's Real Sports. It was cancelled in January 2017.

=== 60 in 6 ===
In June 2020, the show launched 60 in 6 on Quibi, featuring original weekly 6-minute programs. Correspondents were Enrique Acevedo, Seth Doane, Wesley Lowery, and Laurie Segall. It was originally set to launch in April 2020. On the June 21, 2020, broadcast of 60 in 6, Doane covered the show's exposure to COVID-19 in a piece titled "CBS News Battles COVID-19". The piece revealed that CBS News had flown in staffers, including from Seattle and Rome, in early March 2020 to begin filming promotional material for 60 in 6. This brought COVID-19-positive people in close contact with CBS employees; as a result, CBS Broadcast Center and several other buildings in Manhattan were temporarily closed. Quibi went bankrupt in December 2020 and the program concluded with it.

=== 60 Minutes+ ===
In March 2021, Paramount+ premiered 60 Minutes+, a weekly spin-off aimed at a younger audience. The correspondents from 60 in 6 returned for this spin-off, as well as producer Jonathan Blakely. In January 2022, the show was cancelled after 30 episodes.

== 25th anniversary edition ==
For the 60 Minutes 25th anniversary program in 1993, Charles Kuralt revisited notable stories and celebrity appearances and also interviewed Don Hewitt and correspondents, both the active and some former ones.

== International versions ==
=== Australia ===
The Australian version of 60 Minutes premiered on February 11, 1979. It still airs each Sunday night at 7:30 p.m. on the Nine Network and affiliates. Although Nine Network has the rights to the format, as of 2007, it does not have rights to stories from the American program, which is owned by competitor 10 News Australia after Network Ten's acquisition by CBS in 2017. Nevertheless, stories from the flagship 60 Minutes program in the U.S. often air on the Australian program by subleasing them from Ten. In 1981, 60 Minutes won a Logie Award for their investigation of lethal abuses at the Chelmsford psychiatric hospital in Sydney.

=== Germany ===
In the mid-1980s, an edited version (approx. 30 minutes in length) of the American broadcast edition of 60 Minutes, entitled "60 Minutes: CBS im Dritten" ("60 Minutes: CBS on Channel 3") was shown for a time on Westdeutsches Fernsehen (regional channels were also called "Channel 3" to distinguish it from ARD and ZDF, the two national channels at the time). This version retained the English-language track of the original but also featured German dubbing.

=== New Zealand ===
The New Zealand version of 60 Minutes has aired on national television since 1989, when it was originally launched on TV3. In 1992, the rights were acquired by TVNZ, who began broadcasting it in 1993. The network aired the program for nine years before dropping it in 2002 for its own program, entitled Sunday, which is currently the highest-rated current affairs show broadcast on New Zealand television, followed by 20/20. 60 Minutes was broadcast by rival network TV3, before switching to the Sky Television owned Prime channel in 2013, when the contract changed hands.

=== Brazil ===
In 1992, the GNT channel brought its original version with dubbed subtitles from that country. And later, in 2004, Rede Bandeirantes, planned a licensed localized version, but the plan was cancelled. And even so that year, it returned as a frame, i.e. a rubric in the program Domingo Espetacular on Rede Record, a competitor of Rede Globo's program Fantástico.

=== Portugal ===
SIC Notícias acquired the broadcasting rights to the program in 2001. The original episodes were shown in Portugal with introductory and final comments by journalist Mário Crespo, who conducted the program until 2014. It is presently hosted by anchors of the aforementioned network on a rotational basis, who eventually adopted the previous model.

=== Chile ===
The news program of National Broadcasting of Chile (TVN), the public television network in that country, was named 60 Minutos ("60 Minutes") from 1975 to 1988, but the program had no association with the American version and no investigative reporting.

=== Other versions ===
- A Mexican version, which featured Juan Ruiz Healy serving as anchor, aired in the late 1970s and 1980s.
- A Peruvian version aired in the early 1980s, called 60 Minutos. However, in the late 1980s there was also a similarly named series, but unrelated to the series produced by CBS News.
- The Japanese version, CBS Document, aired from 1988 to 2010. Its primary presenter was Peter Barakan. It continued in a slightly different format, under the name CBS 60 Minutes, until 2014; Barakan hosted this version as well.
- Edited reruns of 60 Minutes interviews have aired on various cable channels in the United States, including TV Land and ESPN Classic.
- In Thailand, 60 Minutes (Thailand) was broadcast on TV 9 (from 1995 to 1997) and BBTV Channel 7 (from 1999 to 2001).
- In Catalonia, 60 Minutes has been broadcast by TV3 for 27 seasons.
- In France, M6 launched 66 minutes in 2006, a television magazine with a similar concept and format.

== See also ==
- Panorama (British TV programme), BBC current affairs series and the longest running current affairs TV show in the world
- This Hour Has Seven Days and W5, both of which pre-date 60 Minutes by a couple of years and are similar in journalistic style and format
- Betty Ford's August 1975 60 Minutes interview
- List of 60 Minutes episodes

== General and cited sources ==
- Who's Who in America 1998, "Hewitt, Don S." Marquis Who's Who: New Providence, NJ, 1998. p. 1925.
- Who's Who in America 1998, "Wallace, Mike." Marquis Who's Who: New Providence, NJ, 1998. p. 4493.
- Madsen, Axel. 60 Minutes: The Power and the Politics of America's Most Popular TV News Show. Dodd, Mead and Company: New York City, 1984.
