= 60 Minutes Sports =

- Genre: News television series
- Created by: Based on 60 Minutes, by Don Hewitt
- Starring: Sharyn Alfonsi; James Brown; Anderson Cooper; Armen Keteyian; Lara Logan; Scott Pelley
- Country of origin: United States
- Original language: English

Production
- Producer: CBS News
- Production locations: CBS Broadcast Center, New York City, NY
- Running time: 60 minutes

Original release
- Network: Showtime
- Release: January 9, 2013 – March 17, 2017

Related
- 60 Minutes

60 Minutes Sports is a news magazine that aired on Showtime from January 2013 to March 2017. It was a spin-off of 60 Minutes, a program aired by Showtime's parent network CBS, with a focus on sport-related topics, interviews with notable figures, and sports-related stories from the archives of 60 Minutes. The series also featured contributions from CBS Sports personalities.

CBS News chairman Jeff Fager stated that the program would "offer the same high-quality, original reporting and great storytelling our viewers have come to expect every Sunday night on CBS"; the premiere episode featured a story on Lance Armstrong's doping scandal, an interview with Lionel Messi, and an update to a past story on Alex Honnold. The Los Angeles Times noted that the series was likely intended as a competitor to Real Sports, a similar sports newsmagazine broadcast by HBO.

In January 2017, a CBS News spokesperson confirmed to TVNewser that 60 Minutes Sports had been cancelled. Its final episode aired on March 7, 2017.

On May 26, 2020 as schedule filler due to the COVID-19 pandemic, CBS announced that it would air a six-episode compilation of 60 Minutes Sports segments on weekend afternoons from May 30 to June 14, under the title 60 Minutes Sports: Timeless Stories.
