= Cecilia Vega =

American journalist

- Cecilia Vega at the 2026 conference of the National Association of Hispanic Journalists
- Born: Cecilia Marcellina Vega; January 7, 1977 (age 49); San Francisco, California, U.S.
- Education: American University (BA)
- Years active: 1999–present
- Employers: KGO-TV (2007–2010); ABC News (2011–2022); CBS News (2023–2026)

Cecilia Marcellina Vega (born January 7, 1977) is an American journalist best known for serving as a correspondent for 60 Minutes from March 2023 until May 2026. She previously worked at ABC News, serving as the network's Chief White House Correspondent and co-anchoring Good Morning America.

== Early life and education ==
Vega was born in San Francisco, California on January 7, 1977. She along with her brother were raised in the East Bay area. Her mother worked for the University of California. In 1995, Vega graduated from Salesian High School in Richmond, California. In 1999, she graduated from the American University School of Communication in Washington, D.C. She is of Mexican and Italian descent.

== Career ==
=== 1999–2010: Local news ===
In 1999, Vega started out as a newspaper journalist for the San Bernardino Sun, the Santa Rosa Press Democrat and then the San Francisco Chronicle where she covered the then-Mayor Gavin Newsom's administration. Her reporting received accolades from the California Newspaper Publishers Association, the East Bay Press Club, and the Hearst Corporation.

In 2007, she switched to broadcast media as a reporter for the local ABC television station KGO-TV in San Francisco. In 2010, Vega won a Northern California Emmy Award for the Best Daytime Newscast in a Large Market.

=== 2011–2022: ABC News ===
Vega joined the national ABC News in 2011 as a Los Angeles-based correspondent. In 2012, Vega covered the elections and second inauguration of President Barack Obama. She also covered the 2016 presidential election and the candidacy of Hillary Clinton. During her time as a national correspondent, Vega covered numerous stories, including the Fukushima power plant disaster, the appointment of Pope Francis, the 2014 Ebola epidemic in the United States, the Sony computer hacking, and the 2016 Summer Olympics.

On March 2, 2015, she became the anchor for the Saturday edition of World News Tonight, with Tom Llamas anchoring the Sunday edition. In January 2017, Llamas was named the full-time weekend anchor of World News Tonight, while Vega was moved to become the senior White House Correspondent.

On October 1, 2018, during a press conference about the United States–Mexico–Canada Agreement (USMCA), U.S. President Donald Trump called on her to ask him questions. He then joked at Vega's surprised reaction, stating: "I know you're not thinking. You never do." Vega brushed aside the remark, and asked Trump about the FBI investigation into then-Supreme Court nominee Brett Kavanaugh. Trump declined to answer, stating the question was unrelated to the trade deal. Vega later tweeted: "A news conference means you get to ask whatever question you want to ask. #FirstAmendment."

In January 2021, Vega was named as the Chief White House Correspondent for ABC News, succeeding Jonathan Karl.

=== 2023–May 2026: 60 Minutes ===
On January 19, 2023, it was reported that Vega was joining CBS News as a correspondent for 60 Minutes. Her hiring made Vega the first Latina correspondent for the program. Vega's first story was about sperm whales, which aired on May 14, 2023.

In 2024, the National Association of Hispanic Journalists (NAHJ) and CCNMA: Latino Journalists of California awarded Vega the 2024 National Latina Journalist of the Year.

On May 28, 2026, CBS News editor-in-chief Bari Weiss announced that Vega, her colleague Sharyn Alfonsi, and two senior executive producers had been fired from 60 Minutes as a result of a shakeup within the program. In response, Vega blasted CBS News, stating that her contract was not set to expire until March 2027 and accused the network of censorship that was "both imposed and self-driven". Remarking on her firing, Vega said in October 2026 that she was "told to put information that is just factually untrue in a piece of journalism", and that she "was fired without cause. I just find it exceptionally disturbing."
