= Laurie Segall =

American journalist and media executive

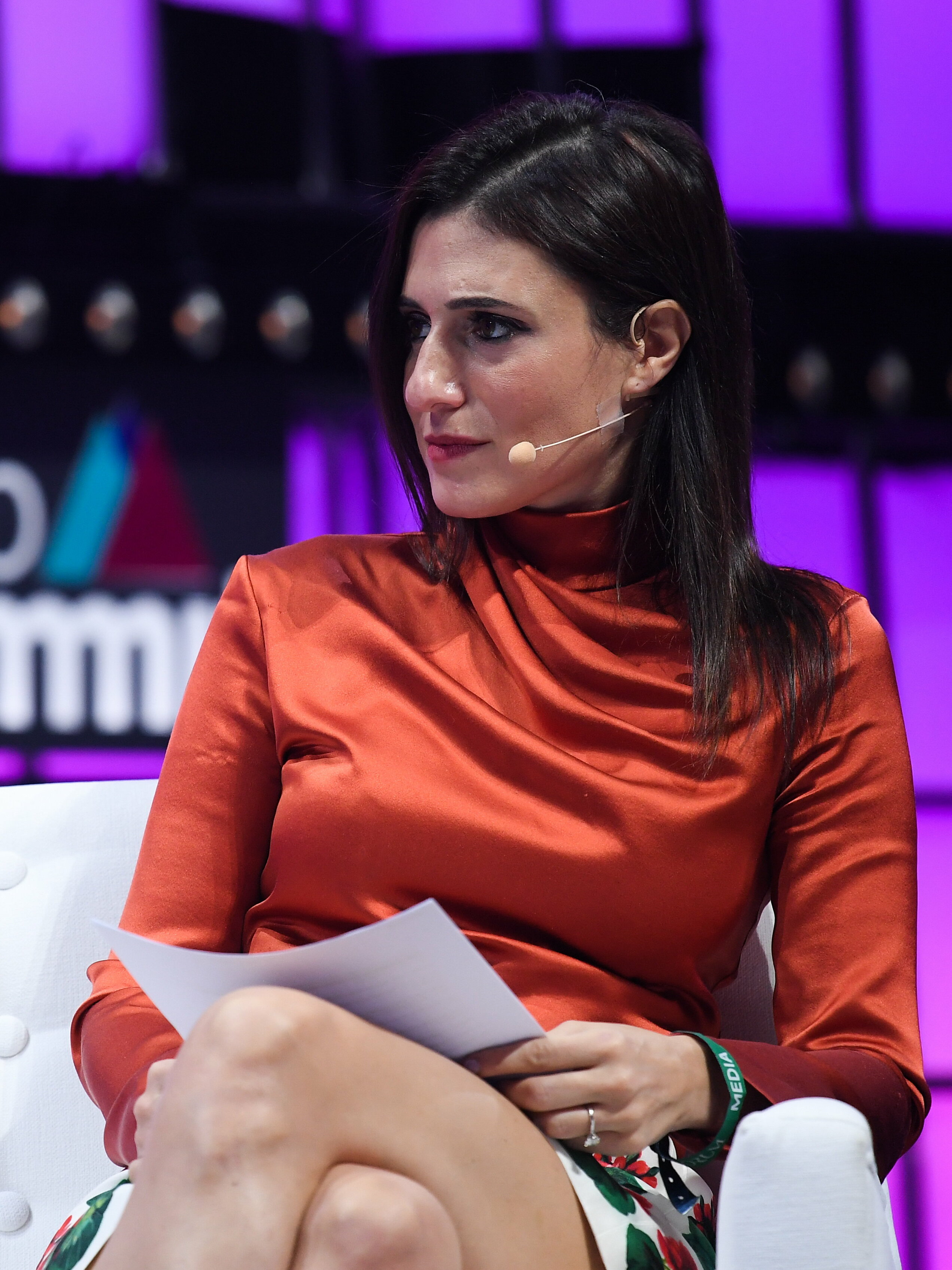
- Segall in 2021
- Born: August 18, 1985 (age 41); Atlanta, Georgia
- Education: University of Michigan (BA)
- Occupations: Journalist, media executive
- Years active: 2009-present
- Notable work: Special Characters: Adventures with Tech Titans and Misfits
- Spouse: Jon Jones (m. 2022)
- Children: 1
- Awards: Gracie Award (Revenge Porn: The War on Women); Webby Award ("My Deepfake Relationship with Mark Zuckerberg")
- Website: mostlyhuman.com

Laurie Segall is an American journalist and media executive. She is the CEO of Mostly Human, a New York-based entertainment media company she co-founded in 2019. Previously the senior technology correspondent and an editor-at-large for CNN, her work focuses on technology and its societal, cultural, and human impact.

== Early life and education ==
Segall was born in Atlanta, Georgia. She graduated from the University of Michigan with a BA in political science in 2008. During her senior year, she interned at CNN.

== Career ==
=== 2008-2018: CNN ===
Following her graduation, Segall worked at CNN as a news desk assistant. She began covering technology in 2009, reporting on startups including Twitter, Instagram and Uber. She interviewed Tim Cook and Mark Zuckerberg, including Zuckerberg during the Facebook–Cambridge Analytica data scandal. She also conducted early interviews with founders including Sam Altman, Jack Dorsey, and Travis Kalanick.

In 2015, she wrote, hosted, and executive produced Revenge Porn: The War on Women, which won a Gracie Award in 2016 for best original online programming. In 2017, she created, hosted, and executive produced Mostly Human with Laurie Segall, a six-part documentary series that explored sex, love, and death through the lens of technology.

=== 2019-present: Mostly Human, 60 Minutes, Special Characters ===
Segall left CNN in 2019 and co-founded Dot Dot Dot, a content studio that initially focused on the human impact of technology. Rebranded as Mostly Human Media in 2023, the studio's initial series was First Contact, an IHeart-distributed podcast. "A blueprint of sorts to the types of stories the new company might tell", early episodes covered the rise of dating bots, artificial empathy, and online privacy. She reported on the suicide of a teenage boy who had become attached to a chatbot on Character.ai; her segment brought international attention to chatbot addiction. Mostly Human's My Deepfake Relationship with Mark Zuckerberg, which examined the future of disinformation, won a 2025 Webby Award in the Social News & Politics (Video) category.

In 2020, she became a correspondent for the streaming extension of 60 Minutes, Sixty in 60. In addition to stories on the rise of online extremism, conspiracies, and the impact of COVID-19 on vulnerable populations, she covered the experience of domestic violence survivors during the pandemic, a segment that won a Gracie Award in 2021. She regularly appeared on CBS This Morning during her tenure on Sixty in 60.

Segall's memoir, Special Characters: My Adventures with Tech's Titans and Misfits, was published by HarperCollins in March 2022. In an article in the San Francisco Chronicle, Kevin Canfield wrote that the book was "a candid account of tech’s evolution in the 2010s, a period of absurd revenue streams, noteworthy innovation and alarming scandals...a relatable self-portrait of an ambitious, introspective person’s arrival at a professional crossroads."

Segall launched Mostly Human in April 2026 as a creator-led media venture focused on the human consequences of artificial intelligence and other technologies.

== Personal life ==
Segall and her husband, Jon Jones, were married in 2022. The founder of Relation Agency, a social impact media and creative shop, he was Barack Obama’s first digital strategist.
