= Frank Braun =

Brazilian journalist

Frank Dirceu Braun
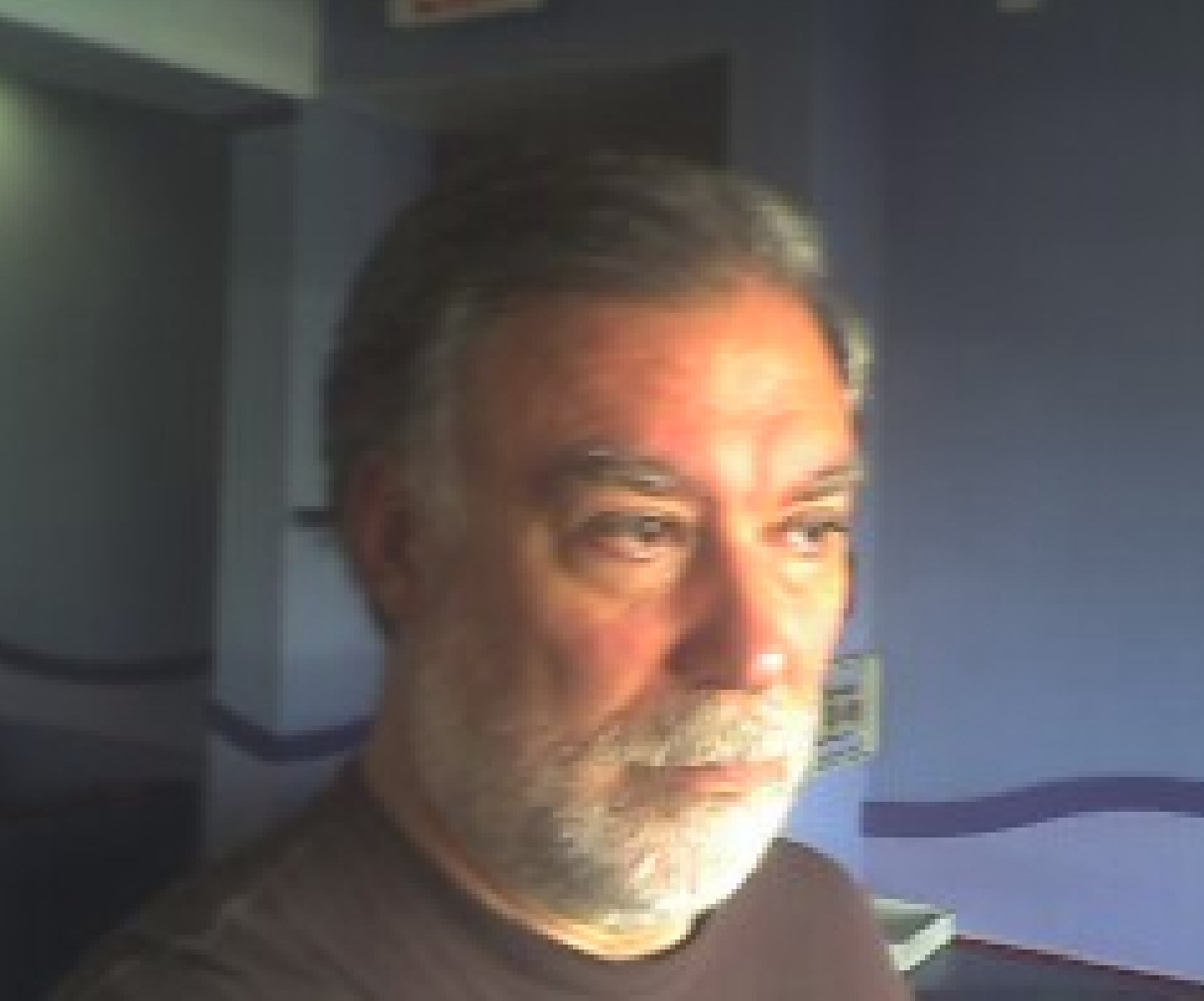
- Born: Niterói, Brazil
- Education: UCLA
- Occupations: Journalist author and entrepreneur
- Years active: 1976–present

Frank Dirceu Braun (Niterói) is a Brazilian and American journalist, author and entrepreneur. He is a writer and producer, with over 25 years of experience in both print and broadcast journalism. Braun has worked as an Associate Producer for 60 Minutes, and as an Investigative Producer for the CBS affiliated stations. He has covered the space programs of Brazil, the United States, and China for over a decade. Braun has also written for United Press International, CBS. News, Space News, and Business Week magazine.

Braun is currently working on a memoir, written as a novel, “In the New World”.

== Early life ==
Born in Brazil, and raised in the U.S., Braun is a graduate of UCLA with a degree in English literature. After graduation, he returned to Brazil to help launch The Latin America Daily Post, an English-language daily newspaper patterned after Europe's International Herald Tribune. He also worked for McKinsey & Company Inc, an international management consulting firm.

== Mid-life ==
=== The Apollo Mission Anniversary events ===
In 1994, Braun was the executive producer for the 25th Anniversary of Apollo 11, mankind's first landing on the Moon. Vice-President Al Gore was the keynote speaker; Braun also produced the 25th and 30th Anniversary Galas of the Apollo 13 mission. In December 2002, Braun and James Cameron's Earthship.TV co-produced the 30th Anniversary of Apollo 17, America's last mission to the Moon.

=== Fusion technology research ===
Braun serves a member of the business advisory board of a fusion technology company. He is also the co-founder of Tri-Alpha Energy Inc., a Research and Development company focused on developing fusion energy for the generation of electricity.

=== Collaboration with James Cameron and astronauts from the Apollo Missions ===
On November 15, 2001, Braun's production company collaborated with James Cameron's Earthship.TV to produce The Arthur C. Clarke 2001 Gala. The Clarke Gala honored Science Fiction Writer Arthur C. Clarke, and was attended by over 400 guests in Los Angeles. Keynote speakers included Film Director James Cameron, Actors Patrick Stewart and Morgan Freeman, and Astronauts Buzz Aldrin, James Lovell, and Robert Crippen. In December 2002, Braun and James Cameron's Earthship.TV co-produced the 30th Anniversary of Apollo 17, America's last mission to the moon.

=== Buzz Aldrin's official visit to Brazilian Launch Center Alcantara ===
In 2002, Braun coordinated the meeting for Buzz Aldrin and previous governor Roseana Sarney, followed by an official visit to the Brazilian rocket launch center of Alcantara.

=== The Third Global Summit on Peace through Tourism in Pattaya, Thailand, 2005 ===
Braun was one of the speakers on the session of "Role of Media in a 21st Century"

== Nominations and awards ==
In 1992, Braun was nominated for an Emmy and captured all of the significant awards presented by the San Diego Press Club for Best Investigative journalism for television. Those awards were presented for "Bad Doctors, Blind Trust", an investigative series Braun wrote and produced, which led to reform of the California Medical Board.

== Works cited by others ==
- Article Alcantara – Ready and Waiting was cited in Steven Lambakis's book, On the Edge of Earth: The Future of American Space Power.
- Article Brazilian Congress Criticizes Bilateral Agreement with US was cited in Victor Zaborsky's report, The Brazilian Export Control System.
- Article Romancing the Skies was cited in LT Col Robert D. Newberry's (USAF) journal Latin American Countries with Space Programs, Colleagues or Competitors?.

== Publications ==
- A Strange Confluence of Flights
- Brazil Exercises the Option to Say No
- Brazil Gears Up For Commercial Spaceport
- Brazil's Space Race on Throttle Up
- Brazil in Space Pushing To Be A Player
- Brazil: The Survival of the Poorest
- The Martian Metro
- Zheng He Revisited: Space Exploration and Sino-Brazilian Relations
