= Bill Whitaker (journalist) =

American journalist

- Born: August 26, 1951 (age 74); Philadelphia, Pennsylvania, U.S.
- Education: Hobart College (BA); Boston University (MA); University of California, Berkeley (MS)
- Occupation: Journalist
- Years active: 1979–present
- Known for: 60 Minutes
- Spouse: Teresita Michele Conley (m. 1982)
- Children: 2

Bill Whitaker (born August 26, 1951) is an American television journalist and a correspondent for the CBS News program 60 Minutes.

== Early life and education ==
Whitaker was born in Philadelphia on August 26, 1951. He graduated from Hobart College with a bachelor's degree in American history. He went on to graduate study at Boston University, earning a Master's degree in African-American studies. He also attended a graduate journalism program at the University of California, Berkeley, in 1978. He started his career before he could complete his master's thesis, which he ultimately did in 2016.

== Career ==
Whitaker's broadcast journalism career began in 1979 at KQED in San Francisco. In 1982, Whitaker became a correspondent for WBTV in Charlotte, North Carolina. He then moved to Atlanta, where he covered politics from 1985 to 1989. He joined CBS News as a reporter in November 1984. He became the CBS News Tokyo correspondent from 1989 to 1992. In November 1992, Whitaker moved to Los Angeles and became a CBS News correspondent there.

During his time at CBS, Whitaker has covered many big events and disasters. Some include the Fukushima Daiichi nuclear disaster, the 2010 Haiti earthquake and the war in Afghanistan (more specifically in Kabul). He also has covered many race-related issues such as policing in cities such as Cleveland, Chicago and Tulsa. In Tulsa, Whitaker had a notable first interview with Betty Jo Shelby, the former police officer accused of shooting and killing Terence Crutcher, an unarmed black man.

In March 2014, Whitaker became a correspondent for the CBS news program 60 Minutes, for which he began reporting in the fall season.

In 2021, following the death of host Alex Trebek, it was announced that Whitaker, among others, would guest-host Jeopardy! His ten episodes aired May 3–14, 2021.

== Awards and recognition ==
Whitaker was awarded an honorary Doctorate of Humane Letters from Hobart and William Smith Colleges in 1997.

In June 2015, Whitaker received an honorary doctorate from Knox College in Illinois.

== Personal life ==
Whitaker resides in New York City. He and his wife are the parents of two children.
