= Holly Williams (journalist) =

Australian journalist

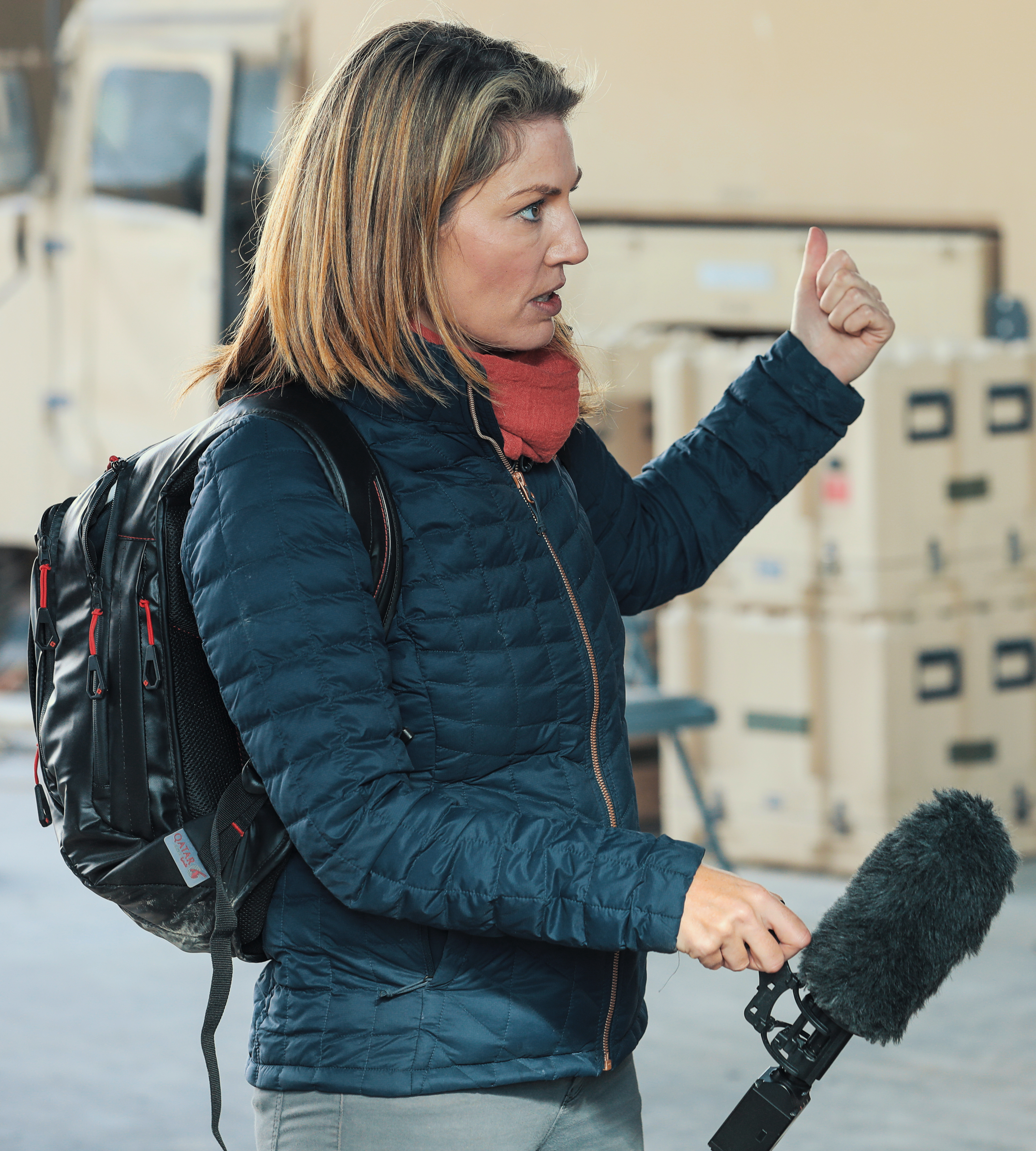
- Williams interviewing for CBS News at Al Asad Airbase after a missile attack, 2020.
- Born: Tasmania, Australia
- Education: Australian National University (BA); Deakin University (MA)
- Children: 2

Holly Williams is an Australian foreign correspondent and war correspondent who has worked for CBS since 2012. Prior to that, she worked for BBC News, CNN, and Sky News.

== Early life and education ==
Williams grew up in Tasmania and Victoria, Australia. She attended high school in Victoria. Growing up, she was interested in journalism. Williams became interested in China when she was 12 years old while watching the Tiananmen Square Protests on television. At age 15 she persuaded her parents to let her visit China for three months in an exchange program.

Upon returning home she began studying Chinese in high school. Williams became enamored with learning about and watching Chinese films, including “Farewell My Concubine,” directed by Chen Kaige. Years later as a reporter working in China, she interviewed Kaige.

Williams obtained a bachelor's degree in Chinese language studies and Asian history from the Australian National University. Then she earned a master's degree in international relations from Deakin University. After graduating, Williams became an intern for CNN working in China.

From 2007 to 2008, Williams was a Nieman Fellow at Harvard University.

== Career ==
After her internship, Williams began doing her own camera work, and covered the 2008 Summer Olympics in China. This led to her being hired for her first job as a correspondent and she spent 12 years in China, becoming fluent in Chinese. She worked for BBC News, CNN, and Sky News.

Williams next worked as a war correspondent in conflict areas in Iraq, Yemen, Pakistan, Afghanistan, Gaza, Syria and Libya. She also reported from the conflict area in the Donbas region of Ukraine in the trenches in the line of separation from pro-Russian rebels.

Williams was hired by CBS in October 2012. She then studied Turkish when she was a correspondent in Turkey.

On 21 August 2015, the New York Times included Williams in an article about leading female war correspondents. Elle magazine profiled Williams and several other women in a March 2016 article on female correspondents at CBS.

On 12 March 2017, 60 Minutes broadcast two segments Williams produced centered around a series of interviews she conducted with Mohamedou Slahi. Slahi was one of the few individuals held in Guantanamo that American officials explicitly acknowledge torturing. CBS News described the interviews as Slahi's first television interviews since his repatriation. Williams traveled to Mauritania for those interviews.

In 2021 Williams went back to Ukraine and began filming stories on the Russo-Ukrainian war. She visited eastern Ukraine to report on the war zone, where she was accompanied by Ukrainian President Volodymyr Zelenskyy.

== Journalism awards ==
Williams received the Edward R. Murrow Award and the Jack R. Howard Award for her war coverage of the terrorist organization ISIS. Williams and colleague Andrew Portch received the 2012 Polk Award for coverage of Chen Guangcheng, a Chinese human rights activist. In 2019 she received the Free Expression Award for courageous acts.

Williams also produced stories that won the Royal Television Society Award, the Foreign Press Association Award and the Golden Nymph.

== Personal life ==
Williams is married and lives with her husband and their daughter and son in Istanbul, Turkey.
