= Matt Gutman =

American reporter for CBS News (born 1977)

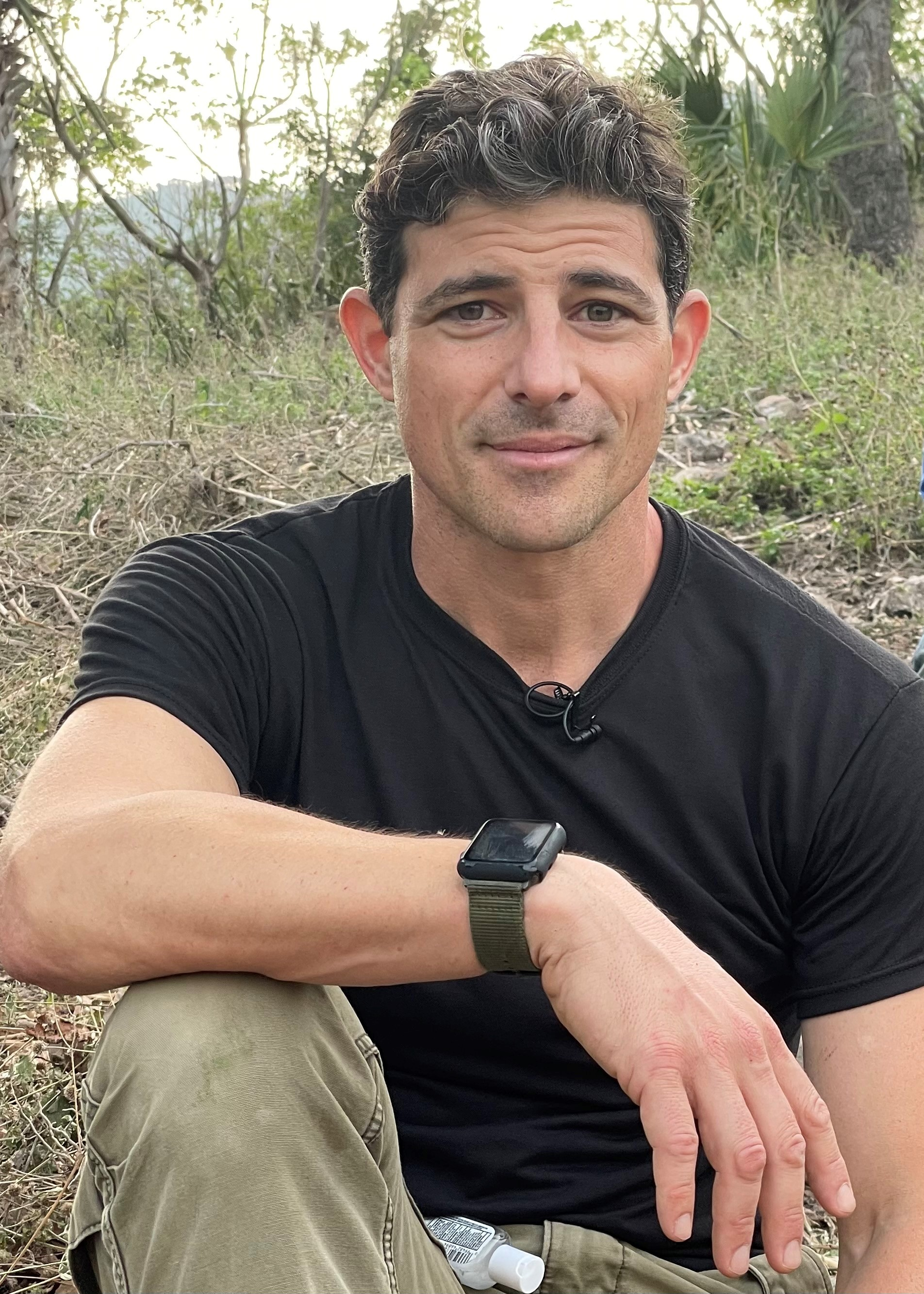
- Born: Matthew A. Gutman; December 5, 1977 (age 48); Princeton, New Jersey, U.S.
- Education: Williams College
- Years active: 2000–present
- Known for: Television reporter
- Spouse: Daphna Venyige (m. 2007)
- Children: 2

Matt Gutman (born December 5, 1977) is an American journalist and author who is currently the chief correspondent for CBS News.

He has been recognized with multiple awards from organizations including The Emmy Awards, RTDNA, the Peabody and the Society of Professional Journalists. He is also the author of the books No Time to Panic: How I Curbed My Anxiety and Conquered a Lifetime of Panic Attacks (2023) and The Boys in the Cave: Deep Inside the Impossible Rescue in Thailand (2018) about the Tham Luang cave rescue. He was the host of the American weekly TV series Sea Rescue when it ended in September 2018 and won an Emmy for Outstanding Children's Series in 2016.

== Early life and education ==
Matthew A. Gutman was born to a Jewish family in Princeton, New Jersey on December 5, 1977. His father, Paul, was killed in a small plane crash in Georgia on September 25, 1990, when Gutman was 12 years old.

Gutman attended Newark Academy, where he was honored as a scholar-athlete football player. He graduated from Williams College in 2000.

== Career ==
Gutman started as a freelance print reporter in Argentina in late 2000. His first published article was for the now-defunct English-language Buenos Aires Daily, about a robber who serially held up a Buenos Aires restaurant, sometimes showing up with what he said was a knife in his pocket, or a gun, sometimes a syringe. After more than a dozen attempts the proprietors would see him coming, knew him by name, and gave him a few pesos to walk away. The article was about the endemic crime in the city at the time. Gutman was also held up at gunpoint in a restaurant during his six months in the city.

=== Middle East ===
In mid 2001, Gutman moved to Tel Aviv during the peak of the Palestinian uprising known as the Second Intifada and worked for The Jerusalem Post from 2001 to 2005 covering the Israeli-Palestinian conflict. He also worked for USA Today before officially joining ABC News Radio in 2006. Gutman lived in the Middle East for nearly eight years, covering most major conflicts, including the wars in Iraq, Afghanistan, Syria and Lebanon, filing dispatches from nearly every country in the region.

He was working In August 2005, during Israel's controversial and tumultuous evacuation of its Gaza Strip settlements, Gutman was the lone foreign reporter on the rooftop of a synagogue in Kfar Darom, the last building in the last settlement to be evacuated. The young settlers had barricaded the building and were waging a last ditch battle on the rooftop, pelting soldiers below with projectiles. After a day-long siege by Israel's military, the Israeli military loaded baton-wielding soldiers onto shipping containers which there then hoisted onto the Synagogue's roof by cranes and detained them (and Gutman) and pushed them all into shipping containers and then bused them out of Gaza. During that confrontation, and in the haze of chemical irritants and sprays of water cannon, Gutman received a call from ABC News Radio asking him to describe the scene.

It was the start of what became Gutman's 20 year association with ABC News. He has continued to report from the region during major outbreaks of violence for both ABC News and CBS News.

=== ABC News ===
In 2008, Gutman moved to Miami, Florida for ABC News and began appearing on various programs and platforms for the network including ABC World News Tonight, Good Morning America, Nightline and the network's magazine show 20/20. From 2010 on he filed reports from more than 50 countries for ABC News. In 2014, he took over the hosting duties for Sea Rescue and hosted about 120 episodes of the show. In late 2016, while reporting on the collapsing health care system of Venezuela, he was detained and interrogated for five days by Venezuelan police and intelligence services.

He was named ABC News' Chief National Correspondent in January 2018. In his years with ABC News he covered wars from Ukraine to Gaza, and every kind of natural disaster, from earthquakes in Japan, to volcanoes in Chile to tornados in Oklahoma.

On the morning of January 7, 2025 he was among the first network reporters on scene at the Palisades fire in Pacific Palisades, California. He would report on the devastating impact of those fires on multiple Los Angeles-area cities for the next two weeks, while packing up his own family for evacuation.

On December 9, 2025, it was announced that he would leave ABC for CBS News.

=== CBS News ===
On December 9, 2025, CBS News announced that Gutman would be joining the network as chief correspondent on January 5, 2026, to be based in Los Angeles. He also serves as lead correspondent for 48 Hours and is a contributor for 60 Minutes, in addition to being a relief anchor for flagship broadcasts. He is considered the first major hire by CBS News' first editor-in-chief, Bari Weiss. Since then Gutman has covered the arrest of Venezuelan leader Nicolas Maduro, the immigration crackdown in Minneapolis and the war with Iran for the network.

=== Suspension and return ===
In January 2020, Gutman in a live special report broadcast minutes after the helicopter in which Kobe Bryant was traveling crashed, was suspended for a month by ABC News for incorrectly reporting that, during the death of Kobe Bryant in the 2020 Calabasas helicopter crash, all four of Bryant's children had died when only Bryant's 13-year-old daughter Gianna, "Gigi", was on board the helicopter and perished in the crash. Gutman's book indicates that experience served as a jumping off point "for a personal journey into the science and treatment of panic attacks," which his book says he has suffered for decades.

That February, Gutman resumed reporting for ABC and appeared on the network's shows. Later in the year, on October 23, 2020, his work appeared in an episode of 20/20 entitled "The Perfect Liar," a documentary about wrongful conviction, in which he interviewed jailhouse informant Paul Skalnik and death row inmate James Dailey.

In February 2021, Gutman was again suspended from ABC News for a short time for violating Disney COVID-19 policies for reporting in a Los Angeles-area hospital for newsgathering purposes. Despite being invited into the hospital by its CEO and medical staff, Gutman had not received the advance permission of ABC News management.

In September 2025 he was criticized for describing messages, read out to a packed press conference by Utah County Attorney Jeff Gray, between Tyler Robinson (alleged assassin of Charlie Kirk) and his partner as "a very intimate portrait," "fulsome" "speaking so lovingly about his partner" and "very touching."

On August 14, 2026, Gutman was accused of workplace harassment in a wrongful-termination lawsuit filed by a former ABC News colleague. The former colleague, Samira Said, alleges that Gutman created a hostile work environment through two incidents while they were colleagues at ABC News.

== Books ==
Gutman's first book, The Boys in the Cave, tells the story of the little known true events behind the miraculous rescue of 13 Thai boys and their coach from the Tham Luang cave in July 2018. It was published in November 2018. It has been translated into six languages.

Gutman's second book, No Time to Panic, published in 2023, and which became a best seller (USA Today) chronicles Gutman's previously undisclosed 20-year battle with panic attacks.
