= Len Tepper =

American investigative journalist (born 1954)

- Born: 1954 (age 71–72); New York, New York
- Education: City University of New York (BS)
- Occupations: Executive Director, CBS News Investigations

Len Tepper is an American investigative journalist previously serving as executive director, CBS News Investigations at CBS News.

== Career ==
While in college at the City University of New York, prior to graduating in 1976, Tepper joined WNBC's NewsCenter 4. He produced local investigative stories, the most well known detailing construction cost overruns on projects such as Yankee Stadium, the Water Tunnel #3 and Seton Park in the Bronx. Along with Chris Wallace and Bret Marcus, the team won the 1977 George Foster Peabody Award for their investigative reports.

=== NBC News ===
In 1982 Tepper went on to work for NBC News where he covered law enforcement. In 1985 he broke the Commission Case. The story detailed how state and federal agents bugged the homes and vehicles of the top Mafia Bosses of New York's five families. Two weeks later the US Attorney for the Southern District in New York indicted them. Tepper also covered the Colombo Family, the Pizza Connection and the John Gotti trials.

In 1985 Len Tepper broke The Pittsburgh drug trials where eleven Major League baseball players were suspended for cocaine usage. The players were granted immunity in exchange for their testimony. The Pittsburgh drug trials are considered one of baseball's biggest all-time scandals.

Tepper also covered the Wall Street Insider Trading scandals including the Michael Milken and Ivan Boesky federal cases.

=== ABC News ===
In 1997 Tepper joined the ABC World News Tonight Investigative Unit. He contributed to two Peabody and two Emmy Awards exposing government waste and international terrorism. Tepper covered 9/11 and was the producer for the 1998, John Miller exclusive interview with Usama Bin Laden. He also covered the Madoff scandal for ABC News and traveled to Nigeria for 20/20 stories on the prolific 419 scams: “Mugus and Masters.”

=== CBS News ===
In 2009, Tepper joined CBS News’ Investigative Unit as Chief of Investigative Projects. His stories were featured on CBS Evening News, CBS this Morning and 60 Minutes. He also contributed to CBS News’ coverage of the Boston Bombing, Newtown Massacre, and the terrorist attacks in Paris, Brussel, and Nice. In November 2013, Len Tepper and the investigative team was cited in a Politico story for having excellent sources inside the FBI.

In 2012, Tepper was named Senior Producer in charge of the CBS News Investigative Unit. In 2015, he was promoted to Supervising Senior Producer. Under his guidance CBS News won the prestigious 2015 George Polk and Emmy for Compounding Pharmacy Fraud. In addition, the unit has won numerous awards including the 2016 Emmy for Investigative reporting in a Regular Scheduled Newscast for Wounded Warrior, the 2017 Edward R Murrow for Genetic testing Gold Rush, and the 2017 Emmy for Investigative Report in a regular scheduled Newscast, ”U.S Air Force Academy Sexual Assault.” In June 2017, Tepper assisted with live updates to a shooting in a Bronx hospital.

In September 2020 Tepper has been promoted to executive director, CBS News Investigations, overseeing the Investigative Unit.

== Awards and honors ==
- 1977 – Peabody Award “WNBC, F.I.N.D Investigative Reports a part of NewsCenter
- 2001 – Emmy Award: “ABC News Post 9/11 Investigation”
- 2001 – Peabody Award: “Coverage of September 11th"
- 2001 – Society of Professional Journalists Sigma Delta Chi Award and Bronze Medallion: "Investigative Reports Post 9/11"
- 2006 – Emmy Award: "Conduct Unbecoming"
- 2006 – Peabody Award: "Conduct Unbecoming"
- 2007 – National Headliner Award Nigerian 4019 scam: "Mugus and Masters"
- 2008 – RTNDA Edward R. Murrow Award: "Pharmacy Errors"
- 2012/2013 – Columbia Dupont Award: "Newtown Massacre"
- 2013 – Emmy Award for CBS coverage of the Boston Marathon Bombing
- 2015 – Emmy Award: "Compounding Pharmacy Drug Fraud"
- 2016 – Emmy Award: "Wounded Warrior"
- 2017 – Edward R Murrow Award: "Genetic testing Gold Rush"
- 2017 – Emmy Award: "US Air Force Academy Sexual Assault"
- 2018- Society of Professional Journalist Sigma Delta Chi Award Television Investigative Reporting (Network/Syndication) “National Flood Insurance Mismanagement”[13]
- 2019 - Society of Professional Journalist Sigma Delta Chi Award and Bronze Medallion “Billion Dollar Medicare Fraud Expose”

– Source [14]

- 2020-Scripps Howard Award Excellence in Broadcast National/International Coverage, “CBS News for “Norah O’Donnell Investigates: Military Sexual Assault.” [15]
- 2020-Society of Professional Journalists Sigma Delta Chi for Excellence in Journalism- Television Investigative Reporting (Network/Syndication) “VA Ignores War's Signature Wound, Leaving Vets to Die”
- 2021-Society of Environmental Journalists- Kevin Carmody Award for Outstanding Investigative Reporting, Large- First Place-“Toxic Legacy”
- 2021-New York Press Club, Gold Keyboard Award- “Military Sexual Assault:Norah O’Donnell Investigates”[16]
- 2021- Society of Professional Journalists Sigma Delta Chi Award for Excellence in Journalism, Public Service in Television Journalism category for “Broken Medical Boards”[17]
- 2022-DuPont-Columbia Award- “Military Sexual Assault - Norah O’Donnell Investigates”[18]
