= Bill Leonard (journalist) =

American journalist and television executive

- Born: April 9, 1916; New York City, US
- Died: October 23, 1994 (aged 78); Laurel, Maryland, US
- Education: Dartmouth College
- Occupations: Journalist and television executive
- Employer: CBS News (1945–1982)

William Augustus Leonard (April 9, 1916 – October 23, 1994) was an American journalist and television executive who served as President of CBS News from 1979 to 1982.

== Early life and education ==
Leonard was born in Manhattan, the son of Jewish parents Ruth (Leonard) and James Garfield Moses, a lawyer. Leonard grew up in Orange, New Jersey, and Westport, Connecticut, attending Avon Old Farms School. He graduated from Dartmouth College in 1937, where he worked for the student newspaper, The Dartmouth.

== Career ==
After graduating from university, Leonard worked as a reporter for the Bridgeport Post and produced radio programs in his spare time.

Leonard joined the United States Navy in 1941, as an officer "in charge of guided missile countermeasures," in the Mediterranean theatre. Leonard reached the rank of Lieutenant Commander by the time he was discharged from the Navy. He served in the United States Navy until 1945, when he took a position at CBS as the radio anchorman for This Is New York and its subsequent television show Eye on New York.

He was chosen as a floor reporter for the 1952, 1956 and 1960 political conventions. After Leonard was promoted to correspondent, Fred W. Friendly chose him for the CBS Reports team. He led CBS's new news election unit from 1961 to 1965 and helped develop exit polling. He then held a series of management positions at CBS News, rising to president in 1979 until his 1982 retirement. As president, he chose 60 Minutes correspondent Dan Rather to succeed Walter Cronkite as anchor of the CBS Evening News in 1981. He also created Sunday Morning. Leonard and Chairman William S. Paley were the only two employees allowed to stay on past CBS's mandatory retirement age.

== This is New York (1945-1960) ==
New York City station WCBS Radio (WABC at the time) first broadcast This is New York on December 31, 1945. The program was broadcast six days a week broadcast at 6 a.m. until it moved to the 9-9:45 a.m. time slot in May 1946. Staff writer-reporters for This is New York included Al Morgan, Fred Freed, and Martin Weldon.

== Personal life ==
He was the stepfather of journalist Chris Wallace. Leonard died from a stroke in Laurel, Maryland.
