= Lucy Spiegel =

- Occupation: News producer
- Notable credit: CNN

Lucy Spiegel was an executive producer at CNN in 2001 and a staff member at the July 2016 Democratic Convention.

== Career ==
Spiegel worked at CBS on 60 Minutes, the CBS Morning News and the CBS Evening News. She was a producer in the New York, London, and Central America bureaus. In 1985, she was a bureau chief in Beirut.

At CNN, she worked on the Larry King Live show. She was a vice president for Weekend Political Shows at CNN. Spiegel served on numerous civic boards and art groups.

In January 2015, Spiegel left CNN after working as executive director for contributors and audience for six years. Spiegel has overseen network commentators, such as Jesse Jackson, James Carville, Mary Matalin, Jay Carney, Ana Navarro, and Donna Brazile.

At the 2016 Democratic Convention, Spiegel assisted Donna Brazile in writing her convention speech and choosing Brazile's wardrobe.

=== Awards ===
In 2009, she was a nominee and winner along with others, for the Emmy "Outstanding Live Coverage of a Breaking News Story - Long Form" for her work on the TV presentation "CNN Election Night in America 2008".
