= Sharyn Alfonsi =

American journalist and correspondent (born 1972)

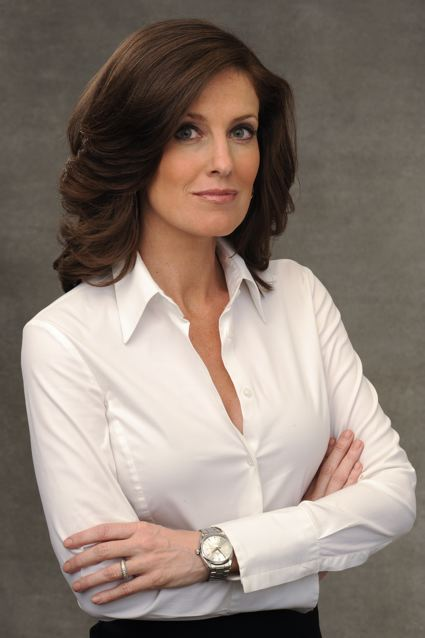
- Sharyn Alfonsi
- Born: Sharyn Elizabeth Alfonsi; June 3, 1972 (age 54); Pennsylvania, U.S.
- Education: University of Mississippi (BA)
- Occupation: Journalist
- Spouse: Matt Eby
- Children: 2
- Awards: Alfred I. duPont–Columbia University Award (2020); 3× Emmy Awards (2019, 2025); Gracie Award (2020); Writers Guild of America Award (2015); Sigma Delta Chi Award (2024); Ridenhour Prize (2026)

Sharyn Elizabeth Alfonsi (born June 3, 1972) is an American investigative journalist who worked as a correspondent for 60 Minutes from 2015 until CBS News did not renew her contract on May 28, 2026. She has won three Emmy Awards, the Alfred I. duPont–Columbia University Award, a Sigma Delta Chi Award, two Gracie Awards, the Ridenhour Prize for Courage, and a Writers Guild of America Award. She has reported from war zones in Iraq, Gaza, and Afghanistan, and covered major events including Hurricane Katrina and the U.S. withdrawal from Afghanistan.

== Early life and education ==
Alfonsi is from a large Italian family and attended high school in McLean, Virginia. She graduated with honors from the University of Mississippi in Oxford in 1994, where she was a James Love Scholar.

== Career ==
=== Early career ===
Alfonsi began her career in local news at KHBS-KHOG-TV in Fort Smith and Fayetteville, Arkansas, in 1995 then WVEC-TV in Norfolk, Virginia, and KIRO-TV in Seattle, Washington, and later WBZ-TV in Boston, Massachusetts. She was hired by Dan Rather at CBS News in 2002 as a correspondent based in New York. During her time as a CBS News correspondent, Alfonsi covered the Virginia Tech shooting, Hurricane Katrina, the Iraq War, and the Israel-Lebanon conflict. She left CBS in 2008 to work for ABC News, where she reported for World News Tonight and Nightline for five years. She returned to CBS in 2011 to work for 60 Minutes Sports, which aired on Showtime.

=== 60 Minutes ===
In 2015, Alfonsi made her debut appearance on 60 Minutes with an investigative story, "Storm After the Storm", about fraud after Hurricane Sandy. The investigation revealed that the Federal Emergency Management Agency was aware its insurance companies had committed fraud against Hurricane Sandy victims, leading to a congressional investigation and earning her a Writers Guild Award.

During the 2016-2017 season, Alfonsi's investigative work included a segment on phone hacking that demonstrated vulnerabilities in congressional security, and an investigation into the misuse of jailhouse informants in Orange County, California, which drew national attention to criminal justice system abuses. In 2018, her interview with Paul McCartney on the season premiere of 60 Minutes drew more than 13 million viewers.

In 2019, Alfonsi received two Emmy awards for her reporting following the mass shooting at Stoneman Douglas High School shooting in Parkland, Florida. She also interviewed Samuel Little, thought to be the most prolific serial killer in U.S. history.

Alfonsi made international news in 2020 when she was the first reporter to obtain photos from inside the jail cell of convicted felon Jeffrey Epstein and his autopsy photos, which aired on 60 Minutes. That same year, Alfonsi and her 60 Minutes producers won the Alfred I. duPont–Columbia University Award for their report On the Border examining the migrant crisis at the US-Mexico border. During her acceptance speech, Alfonsi dedicated the award to everyone who called her a "pain in the ass". She was also recognized in 2020 with a Gracie Award by the Alliance for Women in Media for Outstanding News/News Magazine talent.

During the COVID-19 pandemic, Alfonsi led multiple investigations, including a 2020 report on flawed COVID-19 antibody tests and one of the earliest recorded superspreader events, aboard the cruise ship Costa Luminosa. Her other investigative work during this period included reporting on eBay's harassment and stalking of critics, and the first television interview with David Nielsen, a whistleblower who raised concerns about the financial practices of Ensign Peak Advisors, the investment arm of the LDS Church (Mormons).

Following the U.S. withdrawal from Afghanistan in 2021, Alfonsi traveled to Kabul to cover the country's humanitarian crisis and conducted a rare interview with the Taliban's health minister. She also reported on the Oath Keepers following the January 6 United States Capitol attack and how the militia group mobilized for the assault on the Capitol.

Her profile work has included interviews with celebrities and public figures such as comedian Adam Sandler, actor Nicolas Cage, chef Ina Garten, gymnast Simone Biles, and actress Jamie Lee Curtis.

In 2024, Alfonsi was awarded the Society of Professional Journalists' Sigma Delta Chi Award for her investigative report on Boeing whistleblowers. In 2025, she won an Emmy award for her extensive reporting work from the southern border of the United States.

In December 2025, Alfonsi publicly challenged CBS News' decision to postpone her completed 60 Minutes investigation "Inside CECOT" just hours before its scheduled December 21 broadcast. The segment featured Alfonsi's interviews with Venezuelan deportees who described torture and abuse at El Salvador's Terrorism Confinement Center (CECOT), where the Trump administration had sent hundreds of migrants. In an internal memo to colleagues that was subsequently reported by multiple outlets, Alfonsi stated that the story had been "screened five times and cleared by both CBS attorneys and Standards and Practices" and was "factually correct." She characterized the decision to pull the segment as "political" rather than editorial, arguing that allowing the Trump administration's refusal to comment to block the story would create a government "kill switch" for inconvenient reporting. Alfonsi also stated that CBS had "a moral and professional obligation to the sources who entrusted us with their stories" and warned that the public would "correctly identify this as corporate censorship." CBS News editor-in-chief Bari Weiss, who had not attended any of the five internal screenings of the segment, pulled the story citing the need for additional reporting and on-camera responses from Trump administration officials. The segment was later streamed by Canada's Global Television Network and subsequently circulated online.

On May 1, 2026, Alfonsi received the Ridenhour Prize at the National Press Club in Washington, D.C. During her acceptance speech, she stated: "Thank you for this award. I didn't know that the theme was hope. My hope recently has been that I still have a job. And every morning I wake up to another headline that says I've been fired." A week later, it was reported that CBS News declined to renew Alfonsi's contract, which expired at the end of the month. Alfonsi has enlisted with Bryan Freedman, an entertainment attorney and litigator, to negotiate her exit package. On May 27, Alfonsi released a statement confirming that her contract had expired on May 23, and criticizing CBS management.

== Personal life ==
Alfonsi is an avid runner and sports enthusiast. She and her husband, Matthew Eby, have two children and live in Texas. In May 2013, she gave the commencement address at the Meek School of Journalism and New Media at the University of Mississippi. Her speech was named by NPR as one of "The Best Commencement Speeches, Ever".
