= 60 Minutes season 58 =

Season of television series

60 Minutes
- Season 58
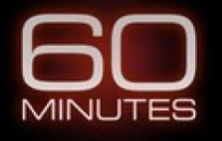
- Logo of 60 Minutes, a CBS news magazine television show broadcast continuously since 1968

Release
- Original network: CBS
- Original release: September 28, 2025

Season chronology
- ← Previous; Season 57 Next → Season 59

60 Minutes' 58th season began on September 28, 2025, to the present time. The line-up of correspondents is the same as season 57. The correspondents include: Sharyn Alfonsi, Anderson Cooper, Scott Pelley, Lesley Stahl, Cecilia Vega, Jon Wertheim and Bill Whitaker. The order of appearance changed throughout the season. Additional reporting was provided by Margaret Brennan in episode 3, Norah O'Donnell in episodes 5, 6, 25, and 27, Holly Williams in episodes 15 and 23, and Major Garrett in episode 29.

== Reception ==
=== Nielsen rating ===
The season 2025-2026 ratings were 8.16 million viewers per episode. The sixth episode on November 2, 2025, received the highest rating for the season. The highest rated episode since January 10, 2021, in season 53.

The partial season rank was 27th with 9.7 million viewers as of April 12, 2026. The show was tied with Wayward. This ranking period ended before the finish of the season. The final five episodes were not included in the April data.

== Episodes ==
No. in season	Title	Topic(s)	Original release date	Viewers (millions)
1	"A Lonely Voice; The Mystery of the Eagle S; Dana White"	US current affairs; Baltic infrastructure; sports	September 28, 2025	10.025
"A Lonely Voice" – impacts of assassination of Charlie Kirk with interview of Spencer Cox, Utah Governor, and Michelle Lujan Grisham, Governor of New Mexico, report by Scott Pelley, produced by Maria Gavrilovic; "The Mystery of the Eagle S" – review of Eagle S, a crude oil and oil products tanker linked to 2024 Estlink 2 incident and the NATO response with interviews of Toni Joutsia, Chief of Staff of the Finnish Navy, Petteri Orpo, Prime Minister of Finland, Jari Liukku, Helsinki, Chief of Helsinki Police Department, Risto Lohi, investigator for Finland's National Bureau of Investigation, Mikko Simola, Commander in Finnish Border Guard, and Keith Blount, Admiral in Royal Navy, report by Bill Whitaker, produced by Oriana Zill de Granados; Interview of Dana White, CEO and president of the Ultimate Fighting Championship, by Jon Wertheim, produced by Nathalie Sommer
2	"Vaccine Court; The Tequila Heist; This Is Rob Reiner"	Healthcare; criminal justice; entertainment	October 5, 2025	6.654
"Vaccine Court" – National Vaccine Injury Compensation Program and Vaccine Injury Table with interviews of impacted families, Renée Gentry, attorney, Denise Vowell and George Hastings, retired court-appointed special masters, report by Jon Wertheim, produced by Denise Schrier Cetta; "The Tequila Heist" – criminal activity of stealing in 2024 products by Santo Tequila, the tequila company jointly owned by Guy Fieri and Sammy Hagar with interviews of Dan Butkus, executive, and Fieri, report by Sharyn Alfonsi, produced by Lucy Hatcher; "This Is Rob Reiner" interview of Rob Reiner with additional interviews of Christopher Guest, Michael McKean, Harry Shearer from film "This Is Spinal Tap" by Lesley Stahl, produced by Shari Finkelstein
3	"The China Hack; Booms, Busts and Bubbles; The Road to Damascus"	Cyber-warfare; financial markets; Syria	October 12, 2025	10.149
"The China Hack" – Cyberwarfare and China with an interview of Timothy D. Haugh, former commander of the United States Cyber Command and former director of the National Security Agency, and previous chief of the Central Security Service, report by Scott Pelley, produced by Aaron Weisz; "Booms, Busts and Bubbles" – review of state of financial market and impacts of potential economic bubble with interview of Andrew Ross Sorkin, journalist and author, report by Lesley Stahl, produced by Shachar Bar-On; "The Road to Damascus" – interview of President of Syria Ahmed al-Sharaa on Syrian civil war in context of Middle East political landscape, report by Margaret Brennan
4	"The Dealmakers; Erez Reuveni; Amy Sherald"	Middle East; US government; art	October 19, 2025	6.904
"The Dealmakers" interviews with Jared Kushner and Steve Witkoff on Gaza peace plan, reported by Lesley Stahl, produced by Shachar Bar-On; Interview with Erez Reuveni, former lawyer for United States Department of Justice, on his involvement with deportation of Kilmar Abrego Garcia with interview of Peter Keisler, former acting Attorney General of the United States, reported by Scott Pelley, produced by Aaron Weisz and Ian Flickinger; Interview of Amy Sherald, American painter with interview of Sarah Roberts, art exhibition curator, by Anderson Cooper, produced by Graham Messick
5	"On the Brink; Dr. Attia Will See You Now; The Mentalist"	Venezuela; aging; entertainment	October 26, 2025	11.100
"On the Brink" United States–Venezuela relations with interview of James B. Story, former U.S. ambassador to Venezuela, President of Venezuela Nicolás Maduro, Rick Scott, U.S. Senator from Florida and Phil Gunson, analysis, report by Sharyn Alfonsi, produced by Michael Karzis; "Dr. Attia Will See You Now" age management medicine by Peter Attia, physician, and researcher, report by Norah O’Donnell, produced by Keith Sharman and Roxanne Feitel; "The Mentalist" interview of Oz Pearlman by Cecilia Vega, produced by Michael Reyl; In the Mail – Bill Whitaker shared comments from viewers from episode four with interviews Witkoff, Kushner and Reuveni
6	"President Trump; Guinness Book of Records"	US government; entertainment	November 2, 2025	13.969
Interview with US President Trump by Norah O'Donnell, produced by Andy Court and Keith Sharman; "Guinness World Records" – British reference book, Guinness World Records, published annually includes listing for world records, interviews with Colin Caplan, organizer for pizza party record, Craig Glenday, editor in chief, and Thomas Bradford, adjudicator, reported by Cecilia Vega, produced by Ayesha Siddiqi; The show broadcast the first segment with a 28 minute edit of the presidential interview by O’Donnell from October 31, 2025 at Mar-a-Lago. CBS News released the video and transcript of the complete 73 minute long interview at the beginning of the live broadcast.
7	"The Family Farm; Collateral Damage; The Indomitable Margaret Atwood"	US economy; education; entertainment	November 9, 2025	7.569
"The Family Farm" – American soybean farmers impacted by trade war between China and the United States and the suicide crisis in agriculture with interviews of Jeffrey Daniels and Franklin Carmack, farmers in Tennessee, Jolie Foreman, leader of NGO for mental health, and Brent Foreman, farmer in Missouri, reported by Cecilia Vega, produced by Michael Rey; "Collateral Damage" – research impacts at Harvard University from education policy of the second Trump administration with interviews of Joan Brugge, Don Ingber, and David Liu, medical researchers, and Steven Pinker, faculty member, reported by Bill Whitaker, produced Sarah Koch; "The Indomitable Margaret Atwood" – interview of Margaret Atwood, author of The Handmaid’s Tale, reported by Jon Wertheim, produced by Nathalie Sommer; In the Mail Cecilia Vega presents viewer responses from episode six to the interview of President Trump
8	"The President’s Pardon; Inside Anthropic; Chess Boxing"	US government; technology; sports	November 16, 2025	11.025
"The President’s Pardon" – Presidential pardon of Changpeng Zhao, Binance founder, a company with links to World Liberty Financial with interviews of Elizabeth Oyer, lawyer, Austin Campbell, former banker and academic, and Lawrence Lessig, academic, report by Scott Pelley, produced by Maria Gavrilovic; "Inside Anthropic" – interviews of Dario Amodei, CEO of Anthropic, Daniela Amodei, president of Anthropic, and Logan Graham and Josh Batson, researchers, on Claude AI's Constitutional AI, report by Anderson Cooper, produced by Nichole Marks; "Chess Boxing" – sport of chess boxing with interviews of Matt Thomas, coach, William Graif, Wayne Clark and James Canty III, chess players and boxers, and Peter Zhukov, promoter, report by Bill Whitaker, produced by Heather Abbott; The Last Minute – Anderson Cooper previews a segment called "Empty Rooms" for episode 9, a photojournalism piece on victims from school shootings
9	"The Bus on Route 62; The Last Best Place; The Empty Rooms"	Ukraine; war; Montana; land preservation; US gun violence	November 23, 2025	6.967
"The Bus on Route 62" – visit to Sumy, Ukraine on the impacts from April 2025 airstrike and investigations into Russian war crimes with interviews of Vitalii Dovhal, Ukrainian prosecutor, Beth Van Schaack, American diplomat, and two families of victims, report by Scott Pelley, produced by Nicole Young; "The Last Best Place" – land preservationists in Montana, known as The Last Best Place, influence U.S. legislation to remove provisions for sale of Federal public lands with interview of Mannix family, Montana ranchers, a conservation group, and Ryan Zinke, U.S. representative for a Montana district, report by Jon Wertheim, produced by David M. Levine; "The Empty Rooms" photojournalism project of correspondent Steve Hartman and photographer Lou Bopp on victims from school shootings with interviews of families of victims, report by Anderson Cooper, produced by Katie Brennan; The Last Minute preview of interview of Lamine Yamal for episode 10
10	"Polymarket; CRISPR Kids; Lamine Yamal"	Speculation; science; sports	November 30, 2025	10.900
"Polymarket" – interview with founder Shayne Coplan of Polymarket, a cryptocurrency-based prediction market with interviews of Domer, trader, report by Anderson Cooper, produced by Graham Messick; "CRISPR Kids" – student scientists from Lambert High School using CRISPR technology to detect Lyme disease and compete in iGEM competition in Paris with interviews of Sean Lee, Avani Karthik, and Claire Lee, team members, Janet Standeven, organizer for iGEM High School division, and Drew Endy, co-founder iGEM, report by Bill Whitaker, produced by Henry Schuster; Interview of Lamine Yamal, a soccer player for FC Barcelona and former member of Spain national football team with interviews of Ray Hudson, former player and broadcaster, and Joan Monfort, photographer, report by Jon Wertheim, produced by Draggan Mihailovich and Nathalie Sommer; The Last Minute update on "Flight on Monarchs" story from season 57, episode 27 on scientists using radio tags on butterflies
11	"MTG 2.0; Character AI; Watch Valley"	US government; AI; craft	December 7, 2025	7.250
"MTG 2.0" interview with Marjorie Taylor Greene by Lesley Stahl, produced by Denise Schrier Cetta; "Character AI" – Impact of AI on young users with focus on the service character.ai, interviews with Cynthia Montoya and Wil Peralta, family of victim, Shelby Knox and Amanda Kloer, researchers, and Mitch Prinstein, director at University of North Carolina, report by Sharyn Alfonsi, produced by Ashley Velie; "Watch Valley" – Swiss watchmaking traditions and current status with interviews of Philippe Dufour, watchmaker, Matthieu Sauret, brand director at Jaeger LeCoultre, Marc-André Deschoux, media personality, and employees at Richard Mille, report by Jon Wertheim, produced by Nathalie Sommer; The Last Minute preview of a future segment on comeback of Indiana Hoosiers football
12	"Germany Rearms; The Price of Life; Hooser Hysteria"	German defense; US medical; sports	December 14, 2025	10.160
"Germany Rearms" – increased investment in the German defense forces with interview of an unnamed German officer, Boris Pistorius, German defense minister, Sven Kruck, executive for Quantum-Systems, Stefan Wilhelm, technology executive for SWARM Biotactics, and Armin Papperger, executive for Rheinmetall, report by Bill Whitaker, produced by Marc Lieberman; "The Price of Life" – genetic therapies like Zolgensma offer new hope at a high cost of medical care in the United States which may not be covered by insurance with interviews of Ciji Green, family of patient, Jonathan Gruber, health economist at MIT, Mike Poore, hospital executive at Mosaic Life Care, report by Scott Pelley, produced by Aaron Weisz; "Hooser Hysteria" – comeback of Indiana Hoosiers football with interviews of Fernando Mendoza, player and Heisman Trophy winner, Don Fischer, announcer, John Mellencamp, singer and songwriter, Scott Dolson, athletic director, and Curt Cignetti, coach, report by Jon Wertheim, produced by David M. Levine; The Last Minute preview of a segment for next episode on Everest base camps by Cecilia Vega
13	"The Sherpas of Everest; Presenting the Kanneh-Masons"	Sports; music	December 21, 2025	10.350
"The Sherpas of Everest" – interview Sherpa people working as mountain guides, report by Cecilia Vega, produced by Jacqueline Williams; "Presenting the Kanneh-Masons" – classical muscians Isata Kanneh-Mason and Sheku Kanneh-Mason, reported by Jon Wertheim, produced by David M. Levine; The Last Minute preview of a future segment on the preparation for the United States Semiquincentennial by Bill Whitaker.; The segment "Inside CECOT" with a look inside Terrorism Confinement Center, a prison in El Salvador was postponed. The report was by Sharyn Alfonsi and produced by Oriana Zill de Granados.
14	"Maduro; Here Come the Humanoids; Alysa Liu"	Venezuela; US foreign relations; industrialization; artificial intelligence; sport	January 4, 2026	8.973
"Maduro" capture of President Nicolás Maduro and his wife Cilia Flores, with interviews of Roger D. Carstens, US hostage negotiator, Sandy Gonzalez, former member of Drug Enforcement Administration, and Mark Kelly, US Senator from Arizona, report by Scott Pelley, produced by Maria Gavrilovic, Aaron Weisz, Nicole Young and Pat Milton; "Here Come the Humanoids" – humanoid robots by Boston Dynamics with AI enhancements for manufacturing with interviews of Zack Jackowski, engineer for Atlas robot, Scott Kuindersma, engineer, Robert Playter, executive for Boston Dynamics, and Heung-soo Kim, executive at Hyundai Motor Company, report by Bill Whitaker, produced by Marc Lieberman; Interview with Alysa Liu, US figure skater with coaches Phillip DiGuglielmo and Massimo Scali, and skater's father Arthur Liu, by Sharyn Alfonsi, produced by Nathalie Sommer and Draggan Mihailovich; The segment on Boom Chicago was postponed due to the addition of the first segment on Maduro.
15	"Minneapolis, Inside CECOT, Salties"	Immigration enforcement; ecology	January 18, 2026	5.090
"Minneapolis" Operation Metro Surge in Minneapolis with interviews of Brian O'Hara, chief of Minneapolis Police Department and Marcos Charles, agent of United States Immigration and Customs Enforcement with report by Cecilia Vega, produced by Andy Court, Annabelle Hanflig, Camilo Montoya-Galvez, Michael Rey.; "Inside CECOT" Terrorism Confinement Center, a prison in El Salvador with interview of Luis Muñoz Pinto, Venezuelan college student deported from the U. S., Juan Pappier, deputy director at Human Rights Watch, Wuilliam Lozada Sanchez, Venezuelan national deported from the U. S., students at U.C. Berkeley's Human Rights Center, and Alexa Koenig, legal scholar at U. C. Berkeley, report by Sharyn Alfonsi and produced by Oriana Zill de Granados. The segment was postponed from a broadcast scheduled for December 21, 2025. It included a modified introduction and closing with statements from White House and Department of Homeland Security officials.; "Salties" conservation of saltwater crocodile in Australia and threats to humans with interviews of Tom Nichols, park ranger, Trevor Sullivan, conservationist, Bob Katter, Australian politician, Gleeson Nabulwad, nature guide, and Robert Namarnyilk, resident of Kakadu National Park, report by Holly Williams, produced by Erin Lyall
16	"Minneapolis; The Far Side of the Moon; Boom Chicago"	Immigration enforcement; space exploration; entertainment	February 1, 2026	7.000
"Minneapolis (Who can you kill?)" – update on killing of Alex Pretti in Minneapolis with interviews of Rand Paul, U.S. Senator, Sam Trepel, former prosecutor in the U.S. Department of Justice, and Daniel Altman, former agent in U.S. Customs and Border Protection, report by Scott Pelley, produced by Maria Gavrilovic, Aaron Weisz, and Nicole Young(Segment title given as "Minneapolis" in title of video for full episode. On screen segment labeled "Who can you kill?"); "Far Side of the Moon" – Artemis II mission sending astronauts to the moon with interviews of four astronauts on the mission Reid Wiseman, Victor Glover, Jeremy Hansen and Christina Koch, Jeff Radigan, NASA flight director, Scott Pace, former executive at National Space Council, and John Couluris, executive for Blue Origin, report by Bill Whitaker, produced by Marc Lieberman; "Boom Chicago" – improvisational comedy group called Boom Chicago, based in Amsterdam, Netherlands with interviews of Seth Meyers, comedian, Peter Grosz, writer, three members of the troupe Andrew Moskos, Saskia Maas, and Pep Rosenfeld, actors Josh Meyers and Ike Barinholtz, Brendan Hunt, comedian, and Stacey Smith, instructor, report by Jon Wertheim, produced by Michael Gavshon (Originally scheduled for January 4, 2026.); The Last minute – Lonnie Bunch III, Smithsonian Secretary, on Joseph Trammell's Freedom Papers, his favorite representation of America
17	"Generally Recognized as Safe; Youngest Survivors"	Food safety; nutrition; war survivors; US history	February 15, 2026	5.995
"Generally Recognized as Safe" – Ultra-processed food are discussed related to a proposed changes to the FDA handling of Generally recognized as safe standards with interviews of Robert F. Kennedy Jr, U. S. Secretary for Health and Human Services and David Kessler, former FDA Commissioner, and Michael Pollan, journalist, report by Bill Whitaker, produced by Sarah Koch CBS News requested comments on this segment from the Consumer Brands Association and the American Farm Bureau Federation.; "Youngest Survivors" – profile of three people, Mark Olsky, Hana Berger-Moran, and Eva Clarke, that were born while their mothers were under Nazi captivity in World War II with interviews of Wendy Holen, author who brought their story to a wider audience, and Charlie Olsky, family member, and the role LeRoy Emil Petersohn played in saving one of the subject's mother and his chronicle of events at Freiberg subcamp with interview of Brian Petersohn, family member, report by Lesley Stahl, produced by Shari Finkelstein; The Last Minute series "Reflections on America" with Ken Burns, filmmaker, in a video essay on "What would surprise the Founders?"
18	"Left Behind; South Africa’s Refugees; Is That Art?"	US economy; US immigration; South Africa; art	February 22, 2026	6.662
"Left Behind" – profile of the economic and social conditions in McDowell County, West Virginia with interviews of Brad Davis, pastor, Betty Stepp and Tabitha Collins, residents and Linda McKinney, director of a food bank, report by Cecilia Vega, produced by Ayesha Siddiqi; "South Africa’s Refugees" – review of the United States White South African refugee program with interviews Darrel Brown, Theunis Nel, Rene Nel, Nhlanhla Zuma , farmers, Wandile Sihlobo, economist and writer, Johann Kotzé, leader of agricultural organization, Max du Preez, writer and columnist, and Kallie Kriel, leader of AfriForum, report by Anderson Cooper, produced by Michael Gavshon and Nadim Roberts; "Is That Art?" Artificial intelligence visual art with interviews of Refik Anadol, artist, Glenn Lowry, museum director, Jerry Saltz, art critic, and Molly Crabapple, artist and author, report by Sharyn Alfonsi, produced by Michael Baltierra; The Last Minute – series "Reflections on America" with video essay by Mike Eruzione, hockey player, on Miracle on Ice, 1980 Winter Olympic hockey game
19	"Iran; Under Siege; Breaking The Cycle"	Iran; US justice system; mass shootings	March 1, 2026	7.214
"Iran" – interview with Reza Pahlavi, Iranian political activist and dissident in exile, with his views on the future for Iran, report by Scott Pelley, produced by Michael Karzis, Nicole Young, Maria Gavrilovic; "Under Siege" – Federal judges under threat including interviews of John Coughenour, district judge, John Jones, former district judge, Esther Salas, district judge, about her home attack, report by Bill Whitaker, produced by Heather Abbott; "Breaking The Cycle" – cycle of American school shootings and family factors questioned by trial of father for shooter at 2024 Apalachee High School shooting with interviews of Buck Myre and Steve St. Juliana, families of victims, and James Densley and Jillian Peterson, professors, report by Sharyn Alfonsi, produced by Ashley Velie; The Last Minute – series "Reflections on America" with video essay by Amanda Gorman; The "Iran" segment was added after the 2026 Israeli–United States strikes on Iran. The segment by Anderson Cooper called "Growing Up Behind Walls" about the recovery from 2021 Haiti earthquake and Mitch Albom's organization "Have Faith Haiti" was postponed due to the story about Iran.
20	"Targeting Americans; Pete Hegseth"	Military; technology; defense; Iran	March 8, 2026	7.320
"Targeting Americans" – investigation into the Havana syndrome with interviews of several victims, David Relman, microbiologist, unnamed former CIA officer and Marc Polymeropoulos, former American intelligence officer, report by Scott Pelley, produced by Michael Rey, Oriana Zill de Granados, Adam Ciralsky (second part only). The segment ended with a statement by the Office of the Director of National Intelligence on the agency's follow-up actions. The segment was the fourth in a series. The first segment was broadcast in March 17, 2019. The third on March 31, 2024, two years prior. Some critics of the CBS News reporting on this subject include Robert E. Bartholomew, Skeptical Inquirer.; Interview of Pete Hegseth, U.S. Defense Secretary by Major Garrett, produced by Andy Court, Andrew Bast, Arden Farhi; The Last Minute – series "Reflections on America" with video essay by Bill Ford on innovation in American history
21	"Choke Point; Laser Focus; Growing Up Behind Walls"	Military; technology; defense; Iran; disaster recovery	March 15, 2026	6.744
"Choke Point" – status of Strait of Hormuz during current crisis and the potential economic impacts with interviews of Silke Lehmköster, captain working for shipping company, Matt Smith, market analyst and Bob McNally, energy adviser, report by Cecilia Vega, produced by Lucy Hatcher and Jessica Kegu; "Laser Focus" AeroVironment defense contractor with interview Wahid Nawabi, executive, report by Lesley Stahl, produced by Shachar Bar-On and Jinsol Jung; "Growing Up Behind Walls" – recovery from 2021 Haiti earthquake and Mitch Albom's organization "Have Faith Haiti", report by Anderson Cooper, produced by Denise Schrier Cetta; The Last Minute – series "Reflections on America" with video essay by Jamie Lee Curtis on "a more perfect Union" in the Preamble to the United States Constitution
22	"Elemental Crisis; Turning the Ship Around; The Dog Aging Project"	Mining; industry; pets; science	March 22, 2026	7.807
"Elemental Crisis" – report from mining rare-earth element (Note: The term "rare-earth" is a misnomer, because these elements are not scarce. They are found only in compounds, not as pure metals, and are difficult to isolate and purify.) in the US when China is the largest producer in the world, report by Jon Wertheim, produced by Graham Messick; "Turning the Ship Around" – building up the capacity for shipbuilding in the United States with the help of Hanwha Ocean, Korean ship-making company, report by Lesley Stahl, produced by Shachar Bar-On and Jinsol Jung; "The Dog Aging Project" – study of aging in dogs to improve human longevity, report by Anderson Cooper, produced by Denise Schrier Cetta; The Last Minute – series "Reflections on America" with video essay by Katie Ledecky on lessons from Team USA at the Olympics.
23	"Inside the Tower; Unmanned; Wonder of the World"	Aircraft safety; military; technology; geography	March 29, 2026	10.299
"Inside the Tower" – interviews with air traffic controllers from 2025 Potomac River mid-air collision, report by Sharyn Alfonsi, produced Andy Bast; "Unmanned" – drone warfare in Russo-Ukrainian war since 2022, report by Holly Williams, produced by Erin Lyall; "Wonder of the World" – inside Hang Sơn Đoòng, a natural cove in Vietnam, the world's largest, report by Scott Pelley, produced by Nicole Young; The Last Minute – series "Reflections on America" with video essay by Mike Krzyzewski, basketball coach, on game plan for America's future
24	"Return to RAM; Ghost Train; The Mardi Gras Indians"	US healthcare; transportation; culture	April 5, 2026	6.185
"Return to RAM" – patient experiences from visiting Remote Area Medical clinics with commentary on founder Stan Brock with interviews of Sandra Tallent and Dave Burge, patients, Brad Sands, clinic coordinator, Chris Hall, executive, and Glen Goldstein, dentist, and Connor Gibson, engineer, reported by Scott Pelley, produced by Henry Schuster and Sarah Turcotte; "Ghost Train" – status of California High-Speed Rail and review of High-speed rail in the United States, report by Jon Wertheim, produced by David M. Levine Statement by Transportation Secretary Sean Duffy provided before broadcast.; "The Mardi Gras Indians" – report on traditions of Mardi Gras Indians of New Orleans, report by Bill Whitaker, produced by Nichole Marks; The Last Minute – series "Reflections on America" with video essay by Franklin Graham with views on American values
25	"Pope Leo's Church; Risk On The Road; What Happened To The Great White Sharks?"	Religion; transportation; ecology	April 12, 2026	10.058
"Pope Leo's Church" – interview of three Cardinals Blase Cupich, Archbishop of Chicago, Robert McElroy, Archbishop of Washington, D.C. and Joseph Tobin, Archbishop of Newark, NJ on 2026 Iran war and United States Immigration and Customs Enforcement and their thoughts on Pope Leo XIV with an additional interview of Manny Dorantes, priest, report by Norah O’Donnell, produced by Keith Sharman, Julie Morse Goff, and Roxanne Feitel; "Risk On The Road" – review safety record of trucking industry in the United States with focus on Super Ego Holding, a network of trucking and leasing carriers, with interviews of Rob Carpenter, safety consultant, Derek Barrs, administrator at Federal Motor Carrier Safety Administration, Daniel Sanchez, commercial driver, and anonymous whistleblower, report by Bill Whitaker, produced by Ashley Velie; "What Happened To The Great White Sharks?" – Great white shark morality off shores of South Africa with interviews of Chris Fallows, zoologist, Alison Kock, marine biologist, and David Hurwitz, tour operator, and Enrico Gennari,marine biologist, report by Anderson Cooper, produced by Michael Gavshon; The Last Minute – series "Reflections on America" with video essay by Sundar Pichai, corporate executive, expressing how "America must take the lead" on AI
26	"Iran's HEU; One Mother's Story; Wild Concerto"	Iran; nuclear security; Gaza; hostages; ecology; music	April 19, 2026	6.689
"Iran's HEU" – review Project Sapphire in Kazakhstan from 1994 as potential strategy for transferring Highly enriched uranium out of Iran with interviews of Andrew C. Weber, security expert, Matthew Bunn, policy analysis, and Scott Roecker, former official at National Nuclear Security Administration, Robert Harward, former Deputy Commander of the United States Central Command, report by Cecilia Vega, produced by Michael Karzis and Graham Messick; "One Mother's Story" – interview of Rachel Goldberg-Polin on kidnapping and killing of Hersh Goldberg-Polin with additional interviews of Or Levy, former hostage, report by Anderson Cooper, produced by Katie Brennan; "Wild Concerto" – Stewart Copeland and Martyn Stewart on their "Wild Concerto" album, report by Bill Whitaker, produced by Heather Abbott; The Last Minute – series "Reflections on America" with video essay by José Andrés, chef, on American food
27	"Shots Fired; Ben Sasse; The Pigeon Mafia"	Political violence; lifestyle; criminal justice	April 26, 2026	7.332
"Shots Fired" – Interview of President Donald J. Trump on 2026 White House Correspondents' Dinner shooting by Norah O’Donnell, produced by Maria Gavrilovic and Keith Sharman; "Ben Sasse" – Interview of Ben Sasse, former United States senator from Nebraska with additional interviews with Mark Warner and John Thune by Scott Pelley, produced by Maria Gavrilovic; "The Pigeon Mafia" – stolen pigeons with interviews of Tom Van Gaver, Ryan Zonnekeyn, Nikolaas Gyselbrecht and Ruben Lanckriet, report by Sharyn Alfonsi, produced by Guy Campanile; The Last Minute – series "Reflections on America" with video essay by William McRaven
28	"Disaster Tourists; Bird of War; Perfume Capital of the World"	Natural disaster; recovery; ecology; Columbia; lifestyle; France	May 3, 2026	6.740
"Disaster Tourists" – disaster tourism, report by Lesley Stahl, produced by Shachar Bar-On and Jinsol Jung; "Bird of War" – rare birds only found in remote parts of Colombia, report by Anderson Cooper, produced by Andy Court; "Perfume Capital of the World" – report on perfume production in Grasse, France, report by Cecilia Vega, produced by Natalie Jimenez Peel and Mirella Brussani; The Last Minute – series "Reflections on America" with video essay by Jill Lepore, historian, on constitutional amendments
29	"Prime Minister Netanyahu; Drawing the Lines; Gout Gout"	Israel; US politics; sport	May 10, 2026	6.564
"Prime Minister Netanyahu" – Interview with Benjamin Netanyahu, Prime Minister of Israel by Major Garrett, produced by Arden Farhi, Andy Court, Marc Lieberman, and Erin Lyall; "Drawing the Lines" – 2025–2026 United States redistricting and the U.S. Supreme Court decision Louisiana v. Callais with interview of Jeff Landry, Governor of Louisiana and Cleo Fields, United States House of Representatives representing Louisiana's 6th congressional district, report by Cecilia Vega, produced by Graham Messick, Michael Karzis and Ayesha Siddiqi; "Gout Gout" – sprinter Gout Gout, report by Jon Wertheim, produced by Jacqueline Williams
30	"Betting on War; The Knowledge; Christopher Nolan"	Gambling; transportation; entertainment	May 17, 2026	7.265
"Betting on War" – current events wagered at online gambling sites may be a form of insider trading, report by Jon Wertheim, produced by Andy Bast and Jessica Kegu; "The Knowledge" – London's taxi industry test, report by Anderson Cooper, produced by Katie Brennan; "Christopher Nolan" – Interview of Christopher Nolan, film director, including more about upcoming film The Odyssey, report by Scott Pelley, produced by Nicole Young; Season Finale

== Post-season ==
One week after the final episode of the season, episode thirty-one included a one new segment, a new The Last Minute feature along with two repeated segments:

No. in season	Title	Topic(s)	Original release date	Viewers (millions)
31	"Booms, Busts and Bubbles; Sculpting Evolution; The Payam Method"	TBA	May 24, 2026	5.287
"Booms, Busts and Bubbles" (repeat from October 12, 2025); "Sculpting Evolution" (repeat); "The Payam Method" – Payam Khastkhodaei on his method for teaching piano with interviews of Hans Zimmer, composer, student, Hadi Partovi, entrepreneur, and students with their parents, report by Bill Whitaker, produced by Rome Hartman; The Last Minute – video essay by Sally Field on the First Amendment of the U. S. Constitution

== Production ==
The executive producer was Tanya Simon. The segments broadcast this season included the following producers and the number of segments produced:

- Heather Abbott (3)
- Michael Baltierra
- Shachar Bar-On (4)
- Andrew Bast (2)
- Katie Brennan (3)
- Mirella Brussani
- Guy Campanile
- Adam Ciralsky
- Andy Court (6)
- Arden Farhi (2)
- Roxanne Feite (2)
- Shari Finkelstein (2)
- Ian Flickinger
- Maria Gavrilovic (7)
- Michael Gavshon (3)
- Annabelle Hanflig
- Lucy Hatcher (2)
- Natalie Jimenez Peel
- Jinsol Jung (2)
- Michael Karzis (3)
- Jessica Kegu (2)
- Sarah Koch (2)
- David M. Levine (4)
- Marc Lieberman (4)
- Erin Lyall (2)
- Nichole Marks (2)
- Graham Messick (4)
- Draggan Mihailovich (2)
- Pat Milton
- Camilo Montoya-Galvez
- Julie Morse Goff
- Michael Rey (4)
- Nadim Roberts
- Denise Schrier Cetta (3)
- Henry Schuster (2)
- Keith Sharman (4)
- Ayesha Siddiqi (2)
- Nathalie Sommer (5)
- Sarah Turcotte
- Ashley Velie (3)
- Aaron Weisz (5)
- Jacqueline Williams (2)
- Nicole Young (5)
- Oriana Zill de Granados (3)
