= 60 Minutes season 59 =

Season of television series

60 Minutes
- Season 59
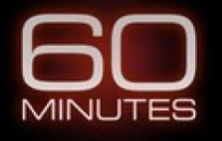
- Logo of 60 Minutes, a CBS news magazine television show broadcast continuously since 1968

Release
- Original network: CBS
- Original release: September 13, 2026

Season chronology
- ← Previous; Season 58

60 Minutes' 59th season began on September 13, 2026. The three correspondents from the previous season, Lesley Stahl, Bill Whitaker and Jon Wertheim are joined by Ross Douthat and Norah O'Donnell. Douthat was a former opinion columnist at The New York Times. Douthat debuted during the second episode. O'Donnell's role on the show changed from contributor to correspondent. Segments reported by additional contributors included Ariel Levy in episodes five and nine, Gianna Toboni, Holly Williams in episode six, Matt Gutman in episode seven and Trevor Phillips in episode eight. Several new contributors were introduced using the The Last Minute feature with the first on-screen appearances for Ariel Levy during the second episode, Gianna Toboni in the third episode, Trevor Phillips in the fourth episode and Sebastian Junger in the fifth episode. Matt Gutman's first on-screen appearance was during the introduction of the seventh episode.

== Pre-season ==
During summer 2026, four contributors of Sebastian Junger, Trevor Phillips, Gianna Toboni and Ariel Levy were hired to work on the show.

== Reception ==
=== Neisen Rating ===
The first episode received 7.94 million viewers. Variety and The Wire reported this was the lowest rating for a premiere episode in over twenty-five seasons.

== Episodes ==
No. in season	Title	Topic(s)	Original release date	Viewers (millions)
1	"Shot Down Over Iran; The Pardon Economy; Battering Ram"	U.S. military and Iran; U.S. justice system; sport	September 13, 2026	7.94
"Shot Down Over Iran" – Combat search and rescue operation in Iran after F-15E was shotdown with interviews of Brad Cooper, American commander, Pete Hegseth, U. S. Secretary of Defense, downed U.S. Air Force pilot, referred to as "BRAVO", and Dan Caine, American general; report by Norah O'Donnell, produced by Keith Sharman; "The Pardon Economy" – Brokering for federal pardons in the United States with hidden camera coverage of Jack Burkman and Jacob Wohl and interviews of Ammon Covino, Crystal Covino, Boosie Badazz, American hiphop artist, Mark Osler, American legal scholar, and Ed Martin, U. S. Justice pardon attorney; report by Lesley Stahl, produced by Shachar Bar-On and Michael Kaplan; "Battering Ram" – Interview of Sean McVay, coach of Los Angeles Rams, Les Snead, general manager of team, Matthew Stafford, NFL player, by Jon Wertheim, produced by Aaron Weisz and Ian Flickinger; The Last Minute – Ross Douthat, in his first on-screen appearance, introduced artificial intelligence as a theme for the season with reference to recent news on AI safety
2	"Patrick Clancy; AI Data Centers; Shergar, Where are You?"	criminal justice; U.S. politics; technology	September 20, 2026	6.77
"Patrick Clancy" – Interview with Patrick Clancy, former husband of Lindsay Clancy, with his wife Rachel Danis; by Ross Douthat, produced by Michael Karzis; "AI Data Centers" – AI data centers offering economic development and various community concerns is topic of political debate across the United States with a visit to Red Oak, Texas and interviews of Jazmin VIllegas, Dave Lowe and Blake O'Quinn, Texas residents, Michael Webber, professor and Dave Eagle, elected official; report by Norah O'Donnell, produced by Roxanne Feitel The introduction screen displayed "The Data Center Next Door" instead of the segment title.; "Shergar, Where are You?" – Shergar, racehorse theft from 1983; report by Jon Wertheim, produced by Nathalie Sommer and Kaylee Tully; The Last Minute – Ariel Levy on use of mobile phones in public and impacts on social life. Levy's first on-screen appearance for the show.
3	"Who needs humans?, The Thom Tillis Tightrope, Saint Francis in the Cloud"	AI; U.S. politics; art; technology	October 4, 2026	10.2
"Who needs humans?" - AI boom and the workplace with on site interviews at Mercor with Brendan Foody, executive, Shawna Miller, Robbie Hiser, and Melania Poonacha, freelance experts, Kim Herlihy, lawyer, Clara Shih, executive, and Daron Acemoglu, professor, report by Jon Wertheim, produced by David M. Levine and Meghan Lisson. The segment begins with an AI generated rendition of Wertheim speaking the introduction.; "The Thom Tillis Tightrope" - Thom Tillis, US Senator for North Carolina on topics from his forthcoming book "How to Lose Friends and Antagonize Presidents", report by Ross Douthat, produced by Graham Messick; "Saint Francis in the Cloud" - technology-assisted restoration of damaged artwork from Basilica of Saint Francis of Assisi after the 1997 earthquake with interviews of Guiulio Cesareo, friar, Giovanni Borelli, executive, Sergio Fusetti, art restorer, report by Bill Whitaker, produced by Heather Abbott; The Last Minute Gianna Toboni provides a brief biographical sketch of her career and her history of reporting on capital punishment. Toboni's first onscreen appearance for the show.
4	"In the Line of Fire,Lost Sheep,Jon Batiste"	U.S. government; security; Israel; Palestine; entertainment	October 11, 2026	6.06
"In the Line of Fire" interviews of two United States Secret Service members Sean M. Curran, Director and Matthew C. Quinn, Deputy Director, report by Norah O’Donnell, produced by Michael Rey, Pat Milton and Julie Morse Goff; "Lost Sheep" - sheep used to maintain boundaries, violence in Israeli settlements and the impact of the Hilltop Youth with interviews of Mordehai Minster, sheep farmer, Sayel Kanan, Mayor of Burqa, Waheed Marsouq, teacher, Faraj family members, and members of Bnei Avraham report by Lesley Stahl, produced by Shachar Bar-On; "Jon Batiste" - interview of Jon Batiste by Bill Whitaker, produced by Marc Lieberman and Cassidy McDonald; The Last Minute - Trevor Phillips with a provides a brief summary of protests in Europe. Phillips's first onscreen appearance for the show.
5	"The Vote,Up in the Air,Sacha Baron Cohen"	U.S. elections; economy; entertainment	October 18, 2026	9.57
"The Vote" - effort by the U.S. federal government to promote mistrust in the integrity of the 2026 U.S. midterm elections with interviews of Deidre Henderson, Lieutenant Governor of Utah and Harmeet Dhillon, U.S. Assistant Attorney General in Civil Rights Division, report by Lesley Stahl, produced by Andrew Bast; "Up in the Air" - disruption to the supply of helium after blockage of Strait of Hormuz and attacks at Ras Laffan, Qatar, report by Jon Wertheim, produced by Lucy Hatcher; "Sacha Baron Cohen" Interview with Sacha Baron Cohen on his previous work and his latest film Ali G: Who Iz I? by Ariel Levy, produced by Michael Karzis, Aaron Weisz and Ian Flickinger; The Last Minute - Sebastian Junger on Ukraine war and potential impact of diesel deal with Russia. Junger's first onscreen appearance for the show.
6	"Destination: Nowhere,#FreeTinaPeters,Australia's Experiment"	immigration enforcement; U.S. elections; social media	October 25, 2026	5.64
"Destination: Nowhere" - recent third-country removals like Moussa Diawara, departed to Ghana, then Mali, and associated legal cases, interview of Diawara and his family, James H. Percival, General Counsel for U.S. Department of Homeland Security and Meredyth Yoon, immigration attorney , report by Gianna Toboni, produced by Andy Court, Annabelle Hanflig, and Camilo Montoya-Galvez (duration 13:10); "#FreeTinaPeters" - Tina Peters clemency by Governor of Colorado Jared Polis, interviews with Kathleen Kelly, victim of Lee Fire in Colorado, Polis, Phil Weiser, Colorado Attorney General, Jena Griswold, Secretary of State of Colorado, Matt Crane, head of Colorado County Clerks Association and Peters, report by Bill Whitaker, produced by Sarah Koch (duration 13:22); "Australia's Experiment" - Australia's age-based limits on social media,report by Holly Williams, produced by Jacqueline Williams and Erin Lyall (duration 13:05); The Last Minute - Jon Wertheim previews a segment on Victor Wembanyama, NBA basketball player, for November 1st show (duration 1:21); After broadcast, CBS News released an extended interview of Homeland Security's James Percival from the ""Destination: Nowhere" segment. (duration 43:09)
7	"Battleground,Cuba in Crisis,Wemby"	U.S. elections; Cuba; sport	November 1, 2026	10.41
"Battleground" Michigan U.S. Senate election with interviews of Abdul El-Sayed, Democratic candidate and Mike Rogers, Republican candidate, report by Ross Douthat, produced by Keith Sharman (duration 13:25). The onscreen title for the segment was "Battleground" and the title shared with full-length video after broadcast was "Michigan Senate Race."; "Cuba in Crisis" - Cuba's citizens impacted by current events in Cuba–United States relations and the government with interviews of Carlos Fernández de Cossío, Cuba's deputy foreign minister, Alejandro Chong, doctor at William Soler Children's Hospital in Havana, Lorien Rodríguez, doctor, and Paloma Blanco, pregnant woman, report by Matt Gutman, produced by Gabrielle Schonder, Ayesha Siddiqi and Christine Romo (duration 13:26) Gutman's first story contributed to the show.; "Wemby" - Interview of Victor Wembanyama, French basketball player on the NBA San Antonio Spurs, with his thoughts on foot health, former coach, Gregg Popovich, meditation and chess, by Jon Wertheim, produced by Nathalie Sommer and Kaylee Tully (duration 13:11); The Last Minute Bill Whitaker encouraging people to vote on U.S. Election Day (duration 1:22); During the live broadcast, CBS News posted a fact checking article about the "Battleground" segment with links to extended interviews with some edits of the Michigan Senate candidates El-Sayed (duration 1:05:32) and Rogers (duration 1:08:00).
8	"President Trump,France on Fire"	U.S. elections;France	November 8, 2026	7.8
"President Trump" - Interview of Donald Trump, U.S. President on midterm elections and the remaining two years of his term, by Ross Douthat, produced by Graham Messick and Andy Court. (duration 27:12) The double-length segment was taped in the Roosevelt Room of the White House on November 5, 2026. The onscreen title for the segment was "President Trump" and the title shared with full-length video after broadcast was "Donald Trump."; "France on Fire" - Student protests in France with interviews of Marine Le Pen, French politician and candidate in next presidential election, Malhia Garin, student, Jhemima Sheilha, bakery owner, and Lola-Fleur Whittaker, student, report by Trevor Phillips, produced by Andrew Bast (duration 13:22); The Last Minute - Jon Wertheim introducing an upcoming two-part investigation into synthetic opioids (duration 1:16); After the broadcast, an extended interview of President Trump was posted online. (duration 51:47)
9	"The Cost of War,Kratom,John Malkovich"	Iran;U.S. military;drug abuse;entertainment	November 15, 2026	6.56
"The Cost of War" - Iran war's effect on families after American service members were killed during attack on Port Shuaiba with attacks in Kuwait, Jordan and U.A.E. and allegations of missed warning signs with interviews of Joey Amor, family member, Stephen Ramsbottom, Major if U.S. Army Rservers and whistleblower, Tanner Carson, civilian medic, Tina Marzan and Michelle Tietjens, family members, report by Norah O’Donnell, produced by Michael Kaplan and Jonah P. Kaplan; "Kratom" - Kratom (Mitragynine) an opioid analgesic compound widely available in U.S. and used as stimulant, aid for recovery, but may cause addiction with interviews of Melanie Clark, patient in recovery, Andrew Kolodny, medical doctor at Brandeis University, several family members of deceased opid users, Justin O. Brower and Alex J. Krotulski, toxicologists, report by Jon Wertheim, produced by Denise Schrier Cetta and Elizabeth Germino. First of two part series on opioids; Interview of John Malkovich by Ariel Levy, produced by Michael Karzis and Katie Kerbstat. Parts of the interview were recorded at the Cherry Lane Theatre in New York City.; The Last Minute Sebastian Junger previews upcoming segment on the Angola Prison Rodeo for episode ten
10	"One Molecule at a Time,The Mass Shooter Fandom,The Angola Prison Rodeo"	TBA	November 22, 2026	N/A
"One Molecule at a Time" - opioid epidemic and the efforts of the Drug Enforcement Administration, report by Jon Wertheim, produced by Denise Schrier Cetta. This is the second part of the series. The first segment was broadcast with episode nine.; "The Mass Shooter Fandom" - True Crime Community and mass shootings in the United States with interviews of former members and experts, report by Lesley Stahl, produced by Ashley Velie; "The Angola Prison Rodeo" - Angola Prison Rodeo, an annual rodeo at the Louisiana State Penitentiary, report by Sebastian Junger, produced by Laura Dodd

== Production ==
The executive producer is Nick Bilton. The segments broadcast this season included the following producers and the number of segments produced:

- Heather Abbott
- Shachar Bar-On (2)
- Andrew Bast (2)
- Andy Court (2)
- Laura Dodd
- Roxanne Feitel
- Ian Flickinger (2)
- Elizabeth Germino
- Annabelle Hanflig
- Lucy Hatcher
- Michael Kaplan (2)
- Jonah P. Kaplan
- Michael Karzis (3)
- Katie Kerbstat
- Sarah Koch
- David M. Levine
- Marc Lieberman
- Meghan Lisson
- Erin Lyall
- Cassidy McDonald
- Graham Messick (2)
- Pat Milton
- Camilo Montoya-Galvez
- Julie Morse Goff
- Michael Rey
- Gabrielle Schonder
- Denise Schrier Cetta (2)
- Keith Sharman (2)
- Ayesha Siddiqi
- Christine Romo
- Nathalie Sommer (2)
- Kaylee Tully (2)
- Ashley Velie
- Aaron Weisz (2)
- Jacqueline Williams
