= Cave pearl =

Spherical speleothem concreted concentrically

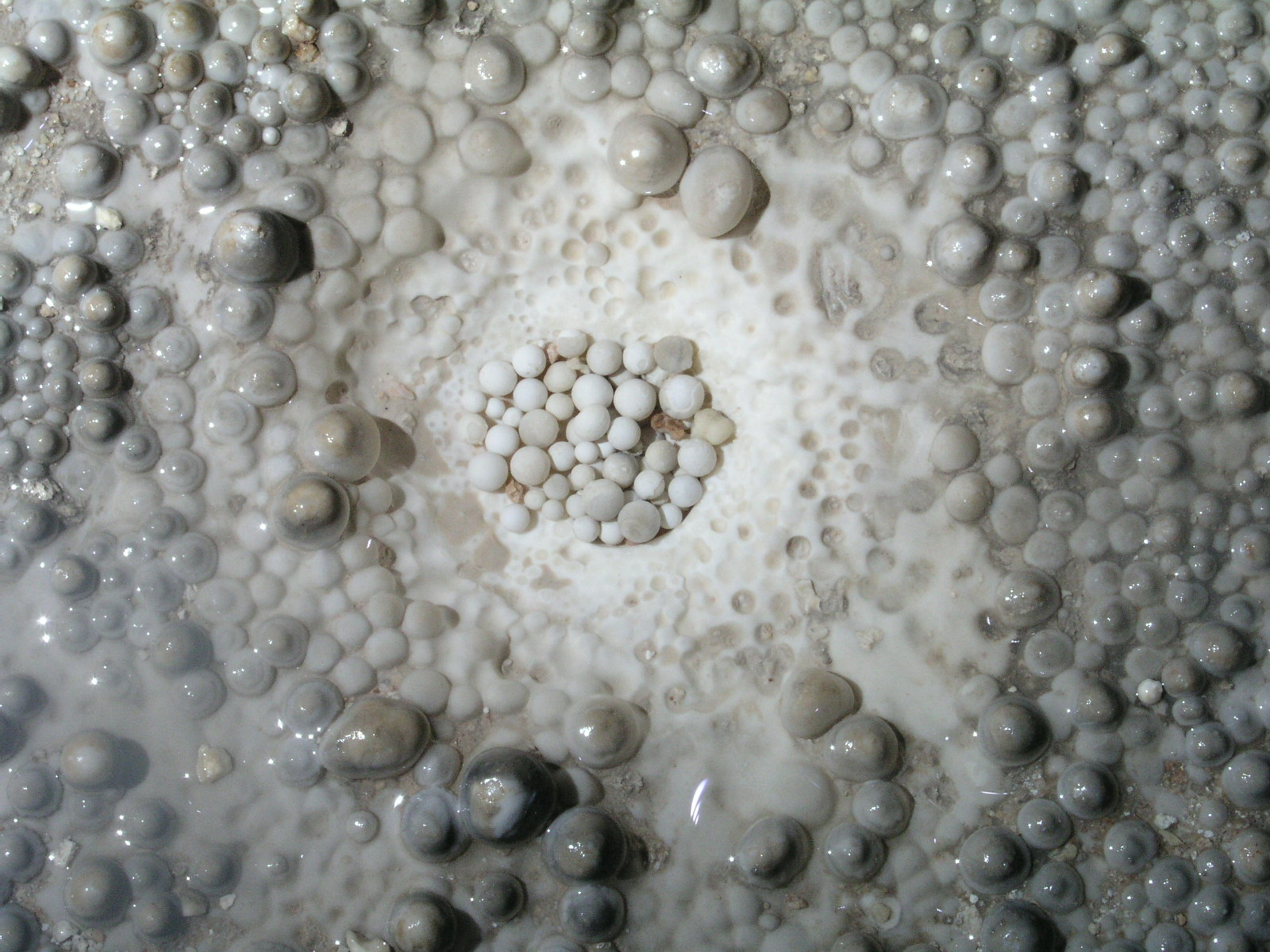
A nest of cave pearls in Carlsbad Caverns, New Mexico

A cave pearl is a small, usually spherical, speleothem (cave formation) found in limestone caves. Cave pearls are formed by a concretion of calcium salts that form concentric layers around a nucleus. Exposure to moving water polishes the surface of cave pearls, making them glossy; if exposed to the air, cave pearls can degrade and appear rough. Unlike pearls found within mollusks, they have no monetary value at all.

== Composition ==
A cave pearl is composed primarily of calcite (calcium carbonate, CaCO_{3}). Cave pearls are generally not considered to be a type of oolite. Other minerals found in small quantities in cave pearls include quartz (silicon dioxide, SiO_{2}), apatite (a group of phosphate minerals), iron, aluminium, and magnesium.

== Formation ==
Diagram of dripstone cave structures (cave pearls labeled Q)

Cave pearls form when water dripping into a cave loses carbon dioxide and precipitates calcite. A cave pearl forms when the water is moving too vigorously to form a stalagmite. A nucleus of matter (such as a grain of sand) becomes coated with calcite, and the current then provides a rotation to the nucleus in such a way that it is coated evenly. In this manner, concentric layers build up over time, in much the same way that a biological pearl forms within a mollusc. There may be microbial action involved in the formation of cave pearls.

The existence of an actual pool may not be necessary for cave pearls to form, as long as the deposit is kept wet and agitated by water dripping or trickling through. If the cave pearl sinks to the bottom of a pool or is otherwise in direct contact with moving water, the motion of the water buffs it to a high gloss. Although the motion of the water often keeps cave pearls from adhering, sometimes cave pearls will stick to one another or to the bottom of a pool.

== Nucleus ==
A cave pearl forms around a nucleus of matter. The nucleus of a cave pearl is typically very small, such as a grain of sand, but can be larger. Some nuclei are made of foreign matter (such as quartz sand, wood, bone, or even plastic), whereas others are made of calcified clay or limestone.

== Shape ==
Cave pearls are usually spherical but can also have other shapes. The reason cave pearls tend to be round is not due to erosion by rotation, but rather that their growth is steady and uniform. Because a spherical shape allows the greatest amount of deposition for the smallest surface area, a cave pearl tends to end up spherical even if its nucleus is highly irregular. Sometimes several cave pearls stick together to form a shape that resembles a bunch of grapes. In addition to the typical spherical shape, cave pearls can be cylindrical, elliptical, cubical, hexagonal, discoid, or irregular.

== Size ==
Most cave pearls are smaller than 1 cm (0.39 in) wide. Large cave pearls grow as big as 20 cm (7.9 in) in diameter. The world's largest cave, Son Doong Cave in Vietnam, has cave pearls "the size of baseballs".

== Frequency ==
Cave pearls are relatively common in caves but are typically present in low abundance.

In Tabasco, Mexico, the Gruta de las Canicas (Cave of the Marbles) is highly unusual in that it contains a tremendous quantity of pearls: an estimated 200 million pearls were discovered on the cave floor, in some areas to a depth of a meter or more. The mechanism for the formation of this vast quantity of pearls has not been determined.

The Rookery, in Carlsbad Caverns, New Mexico, has so many cave pearls that they were at one time handed out to visitors as souvenirs.
