= Hồ Khanh =

Vietnamese logger

Phạm Duy Khánh (born 1969) is a Vietnamese logger turned cave guide and conservationist from Quảng Bình province. He is renowned as the first to discover the largest-known cave on Earth, Sơn Đoòng.

== Biography ==
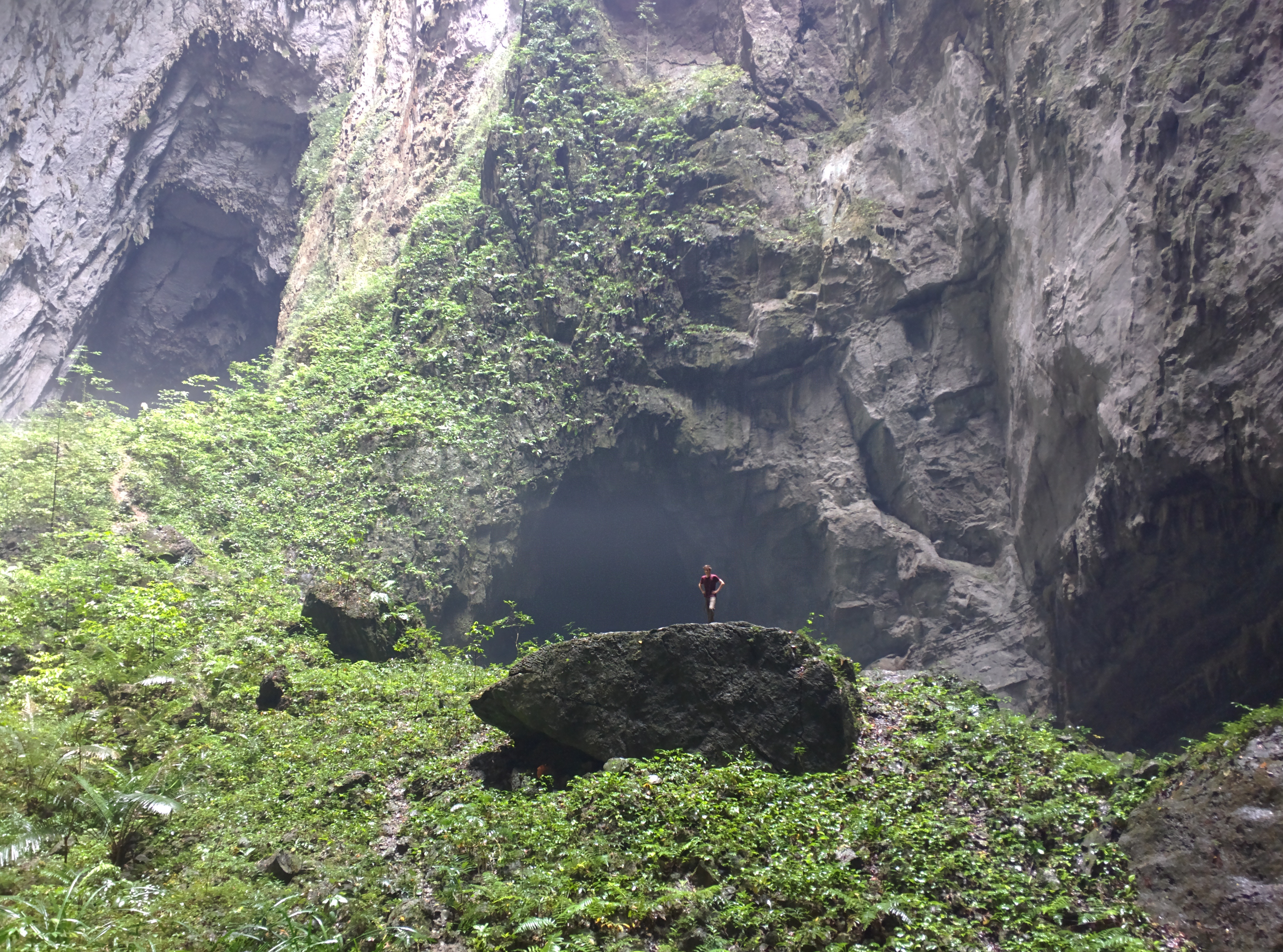
Sơn Đoòng cave doline

During the 1990s, Hồ Khanh was living as a very poor man, trying to earn an honest living in Bố Trạch. During a jungle expedition to extract agarwood in 1991, Hồ Khanh reportedly discovered an enormous cave entrance, with a wide river flowing out of it. Without any rope or gear, Khanh did not venture further into the cave. Khanh later gave up his logging job and returned to farming with his family, but never gave up on the hope that one day he would find the cave again.

In 2006, a group of researchers from the British Cave Research Association, on a trip to find new caves in the Phong Nha – Ke Bang region, having heard about his discovery, came to ask Khanh for help. Khanh agreed to guide the team to find the legendary cave. On their first expedition, the group found 11 previously unrecorded caves, two caves were named after Khanh and his daughter, Thai Hoa. After two more fruitless expeditions, the cavers finally gave in and left, asking Khanh to contact them if he found it again. In a final effort to recover his memory, Khanh headed to the jungle one winter's morning in 2009 and re-discovered Sơn Đoòng. The British team immediately came back to Vietnam and followed Khanh. On April 14, 2009, they found what they were looking for.

Since the discovery, Khanh has been a guide for the team for many expeditions to explore caves in the area. He is recognised for his efforts to help his former companions to give up illegal logging to turn into sustainable tourism business. He is now a cave guide, conservationist and is running his own tour and catering business, Ho Khanh Homestay.
