= Hang Sơn Đoòng =

Largest cave passage in the world, located in Quảng Trị, Vietnam

Sơn Đoòng Cave
- Hang Sơn Đoòng
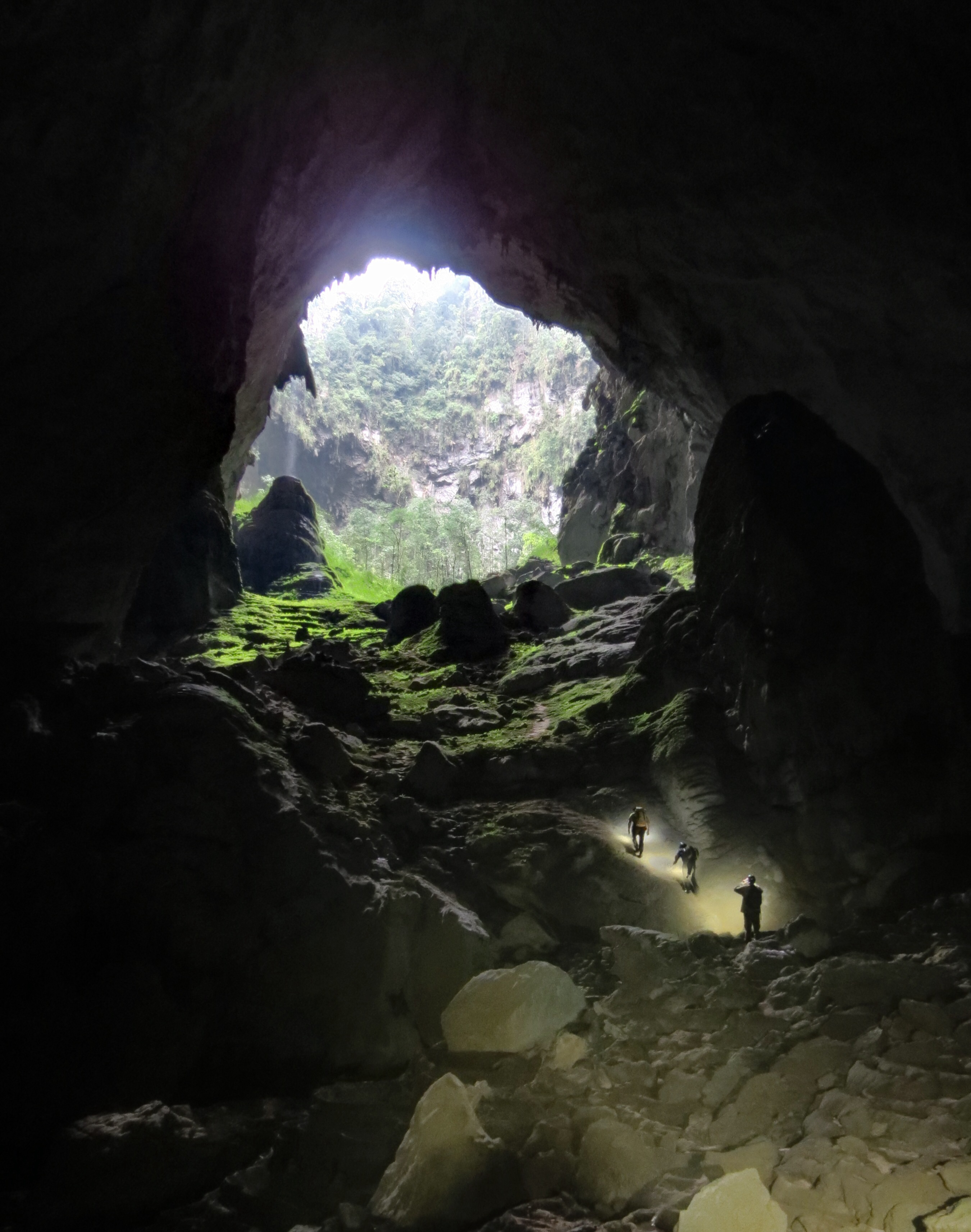

- Location within Vietnam
- Location: Quảng Trị province, Vietnam
- Coordinates: 17°27′25″N 106°17′15″E
- Depth: max. 150 metres (490 ft)
- Length: approx. 9 kilometres (5.6 mi)
- Discovery: 1990 by Hồ Khanh
- Geology: Permo-Carboniferous limestone
- Entrances: 2
- Hazards: Underground river
- Cave survey: 2009, British/Vietnamese
- Website: Official website

Sơn Đoòng Cave (Vietnamese: hang Sơn Đoòng, IPA: [haŋ˧ ɕɤn˧ ɗɔŋ˨˩]), in Phong Nha–Kẻ Bàng National Park, Quảng Trị province, Vietnam, is the world's largest natural cave.

Located near the Laos–Vietnam border, Hang Sơn Đoòng has an internal, fast-flowing subterranean river and the largest cross-section of any cave, worldwide, believed to be twice that of the next-largest passage. It is the largest known cave passage in the world by volume.

Its name, Hang Sơn Đoòng, is translated from Vietnamese as "cave of the mountain behind Đoòng". Đoòng is the name of a Vân Kiều village.

As a solutional cave, it was formed in soluble limestone and is believed to be between two and five million years old.

== Discovery ==
The entrance to Hang Sơn Đoòng was found on December 10, 1990 by a local man named Hồ Khanh, while searching for agarwood, a valuable timber. Although he initially went to investigate further, he was discouraged upon approach by the sound of rushing water and the strong wind issuing from the entrance. Not thinking it to be of any great importance, by the time he returned to his home, he had forgotten the exact location of the entrance. Later, he mentioned his discovery in passing to two members of the British Cave Research Association (BCRA), who were exploring in the local area. They asked him to attempt to rediscover the entrance, which he eventually managed to do in 2008, and in 2009, he led an expedition from the BCRA to the entrance.

This expedition, conducted between April 10 and 14, 2009, performed a survey of the cave and gave its volume as 38,500,000 m^{3} (1.36×10^{9} cu ft). Their progress in exploring the cave's full length was stopped by a large, 60-metre (200 ft) high flowstone-coated wall, which the expedition named the Great Wall of Vietnam. The expedition returned in March 2010 and successfully traversed the wall, which allowed the explorers to reach the end of the cave passage. They estimated that the overall length of the cave system exceeded 9 km (5 1/2 mi).

== Description ==
Formed in Carboniferous/Permian limestone, the main Sơn Đoòng cave passage is the largest known cave passage in the world by volume – 3.84×10^{7} m^{3} (1.36×10^{9} cu ft), according to BCRA expedition leader Howard Limbert. It is more than 5 kilometres (3.1 mi) long, 200 metres (660 ft) high and 150 metres (490 ft) wide. Its cross-section is believed to be twice that of the next largest passage, in Deer Cave, Malaysia. The cave runs for about 9 km (5.6 mi) and is punctuated by two large dolines, areas where the ceiling of the cave has collapsed. The dolines allow sunlight to enter sections of the cave, resulting in the growth of trees and other vegetation.

By mid-2019, the cave was found to be connected by its underground river with a nearby cave called Hang Thung. This increases the potential volume of the cave by more than 1,600,000 m^{3} (57,000,000 cu ft).

The cave contains some of the tallest known stalagmites in the world, which are up to 80 m (260 ft) tall. Behind the Great Wall of Vietnam were found cave pearls the size of baseballs, an abnormally large size. The cave's interior is so large that it could fit an entire New York block inside, including skyscrapers, or could have a Boeing 747 fly through it without its wings touching either side.

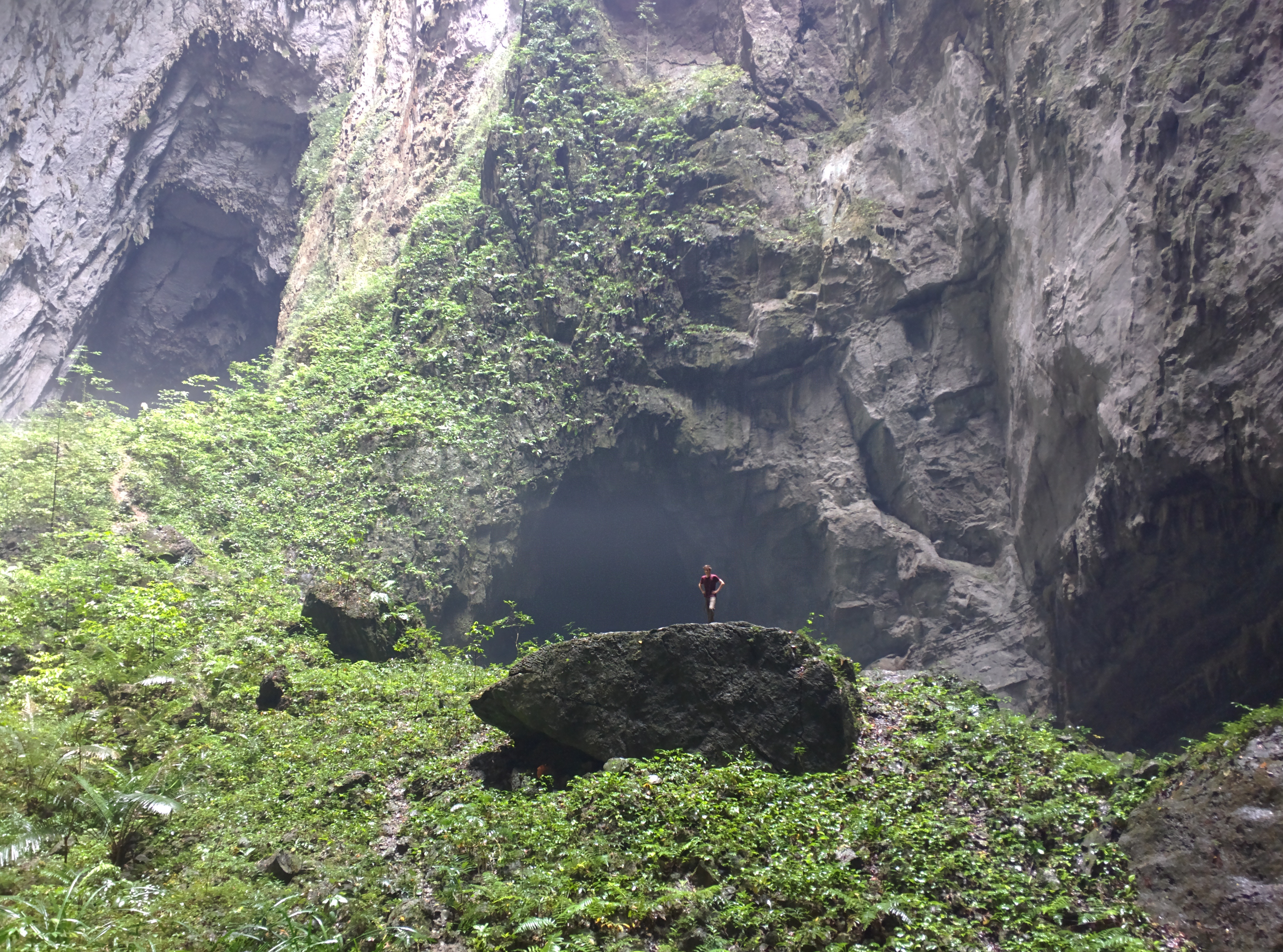
Sơn Đoòng cave doline

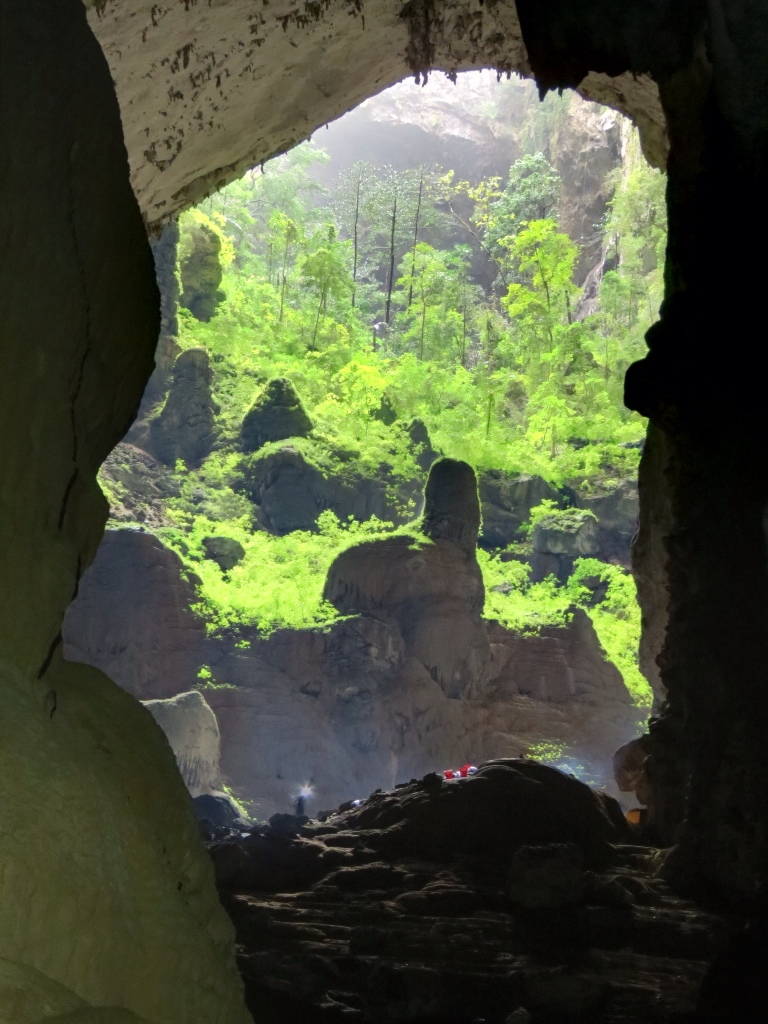
Another view out the mouth of the cavern, showing the rainforest in its doline

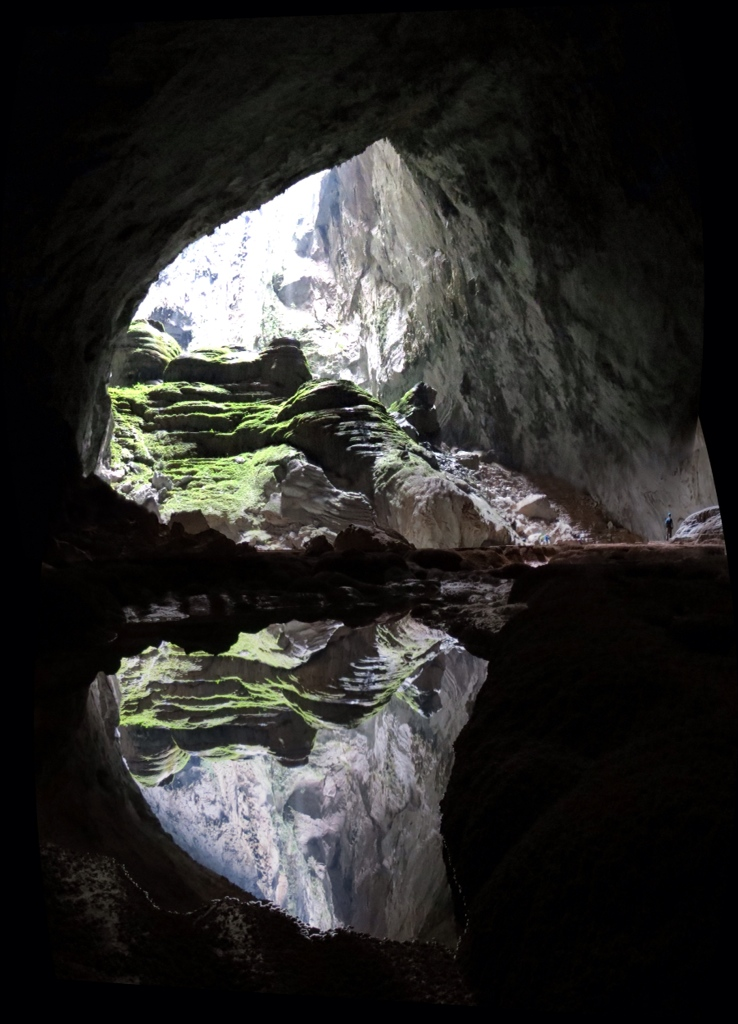
Reflecting pool further inside

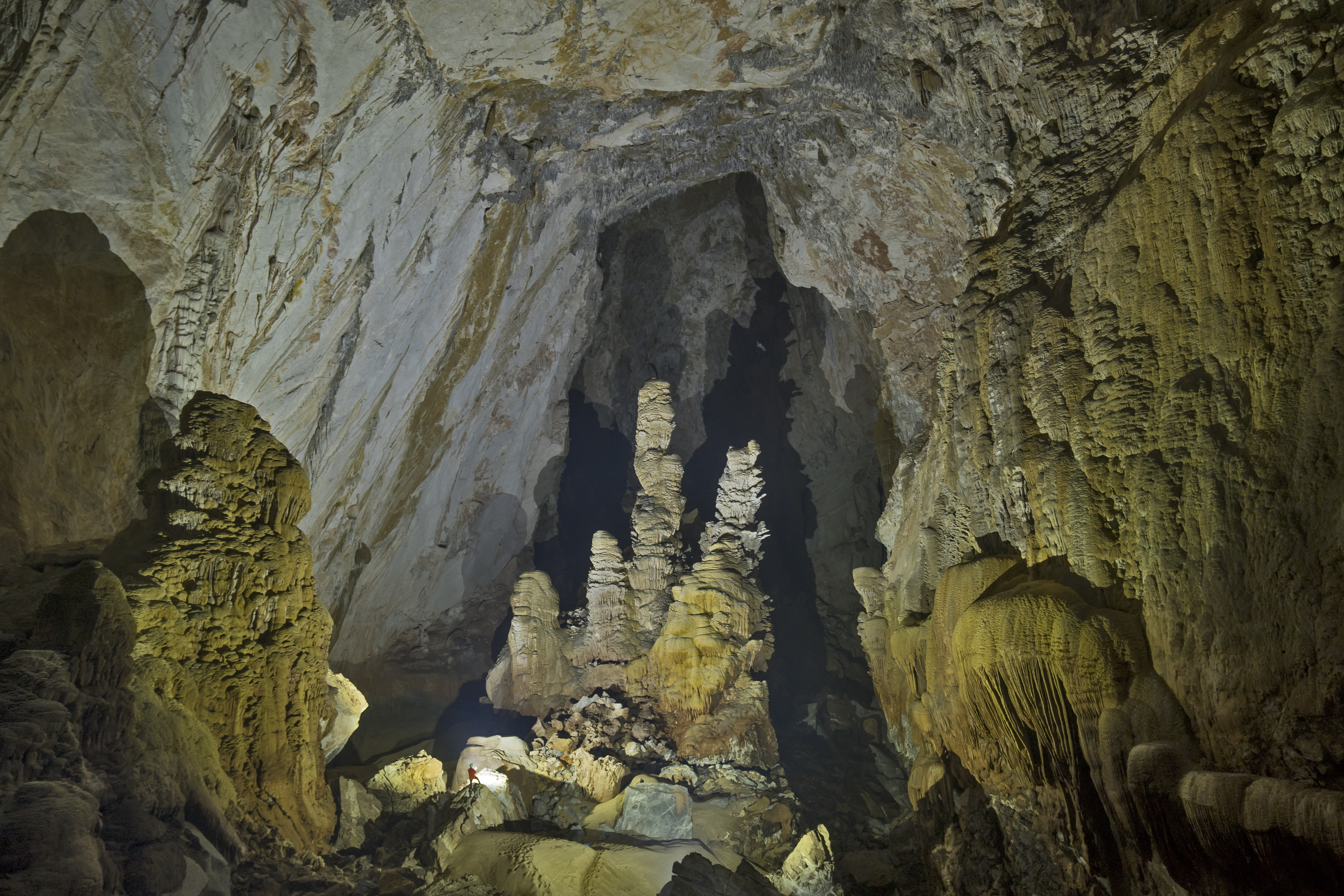
Large stalagmites in the passage of Hang Sơn Đoòng in Vietnam: The tallest has been measured at 70 m (230 ft) in height.

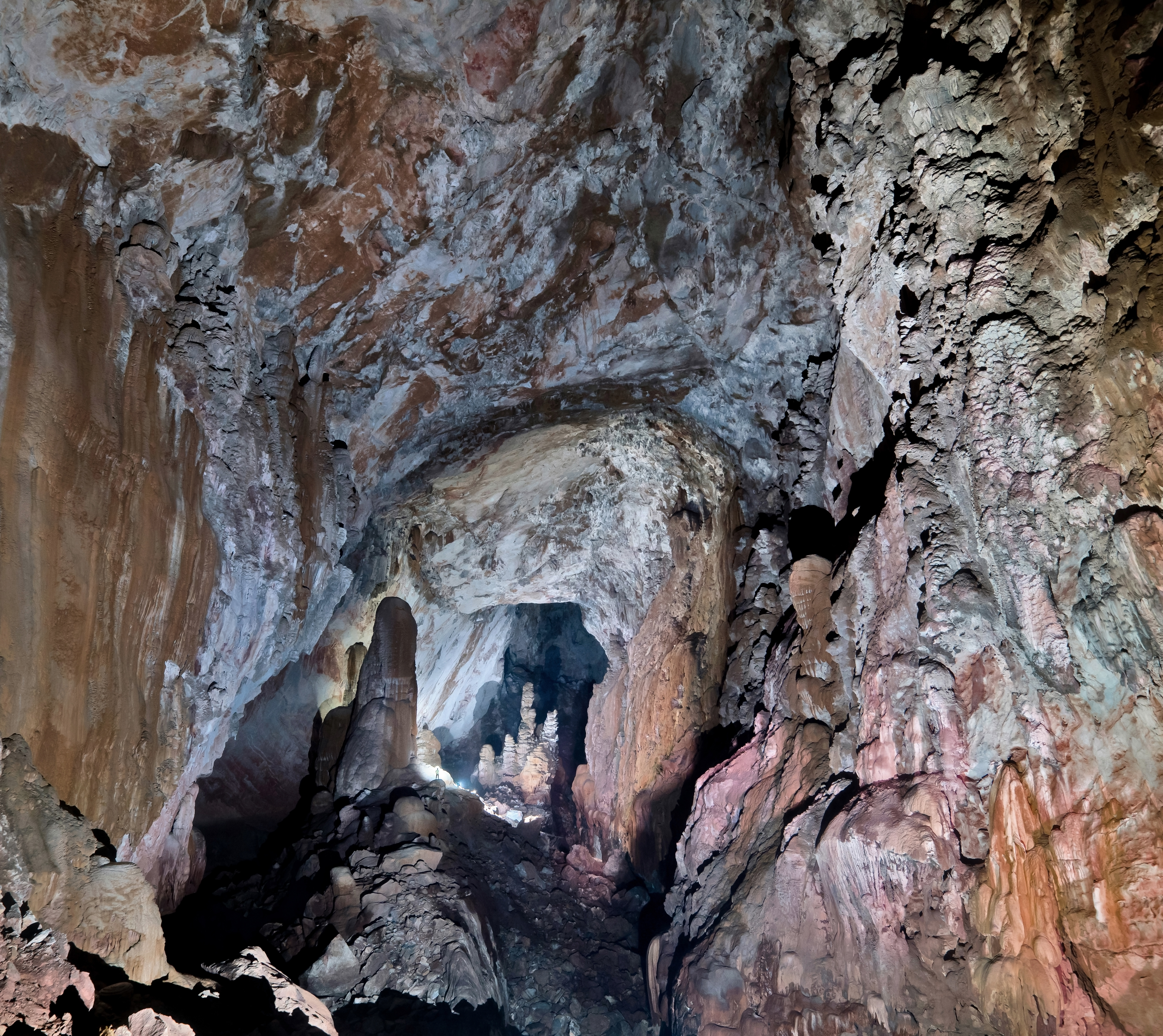
Large stalagmites in Hang Sơn Đoòng: This passage is said to have the greatest cross-sectional area of any cave in the world.

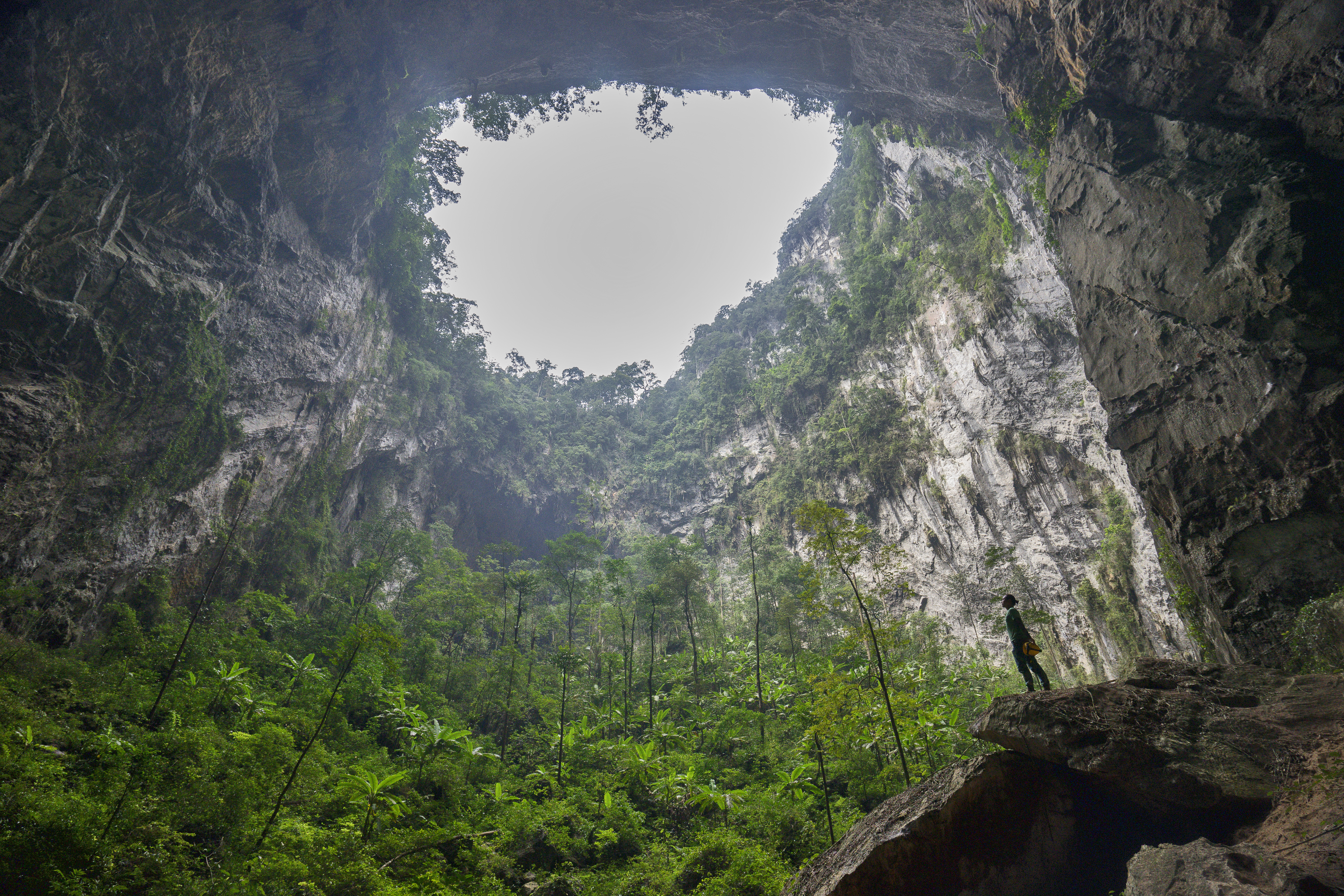
The massive second doline in Hang Sơn Đoòng is so large that trees grow inside.

== Tourist activities ==
In early August 2013, the first tourist group explored the cave on a guided tour at a cost of US$3,000 each. Permits are required to access the cave and are made available on a limited basis, from January to August. After August, heavy rains cause river levels to rise, making the cave largely inaccessible. Since 2017, only Oxalis Adventure Tours has permission to enter the cave for tourism purposes.

== Conservation and management ==
To ensure the long-term preservation of its unique environment, Sơn Đoòng Cave is managed under a restricted-access model. The cave is officially closed to all tourism activities for four months each year, from September to December. This seasonal hiatus serves a dual purpose: ensuring visitor safety during the peak monsoon season, when subterranean river levels rise dangerously, and allowing for ecosystem restoration. This "rest period" enables the cave’s fragile biodiversity, particularly the flora within the dolines and the microbial life, to recover from human impact, maintaining the pristine state of the UNESCO World Heritage site.

== Development plans ==
Plans were considered to build a cable car through the cave. The proposed system would be 10.5 km (6.5 mi) long, and cost between US$112 and $211 million. However, the plans were opposed by environmentalists and locals because of the damage mass tourism could cause to the cave and local environment. The plan was ultimately cancelled by local government.
