= Jillian Peterson =

American scholar in criminology

- Education: Grinnell College; University of California, Irvine
- Occupation: Professor
- Employer: Hamline University
- Known for: Criminology; Sociology
- Awards: 2022 Minnesota Book Awards

Jillian Peterson is an American scholar in criminology and criminal Justice who works as the Director of the Forensic Psychology Program at Hamline University, located in St. Paul, Minnesota. Her academic background includes a master's degree in social Ecology and a doctorate in psychology and Social Behavior, both earned from the University of California, Irvine.

Peterson, alongside James Densley, served as the lead researchers for a three-year grant funded by the National Institute of Justice. This research initiative was dedicated to investigating the psychosocial backgrounds of individuals involved in public mass shootings. Her extensive work in this area led to the publication of the book titled The Violence Project: How To Stop a Mass Shooting Epidemic. Both were awarded with the 2022 Minnesota Book Award.

Peterson is a co-founder of The Violence Prevention Project, a nonpartisan, nonprofit research center committed to reducing violence within society through rigorous research and analysis.
