= Martyn Stewart =

British audio naturalist

- Born: Birmingham, England, U.K.

Martyn Stewart is a British audio naturalist who has been described as the "David Attenborough of sound". His work has been used in many documentaries over the years. He started doing nature field recordings at the age of 19; over the years he has recorded sounds of now extinct species.

== Career ==
Stewart became interested in nature as a child. By age eleven, he spent "countless hours in the woods near his family’s home in Birmingham, England". His first field recording was the song of a eurasian blackbird, using a microphone borrowed from his musician brother.

By 2024, Stewart had made 97,000 recordings totaling 30,000 hours. These recordings included over 3,500 species of birds, insects, frogs, toads, and mammals. Stewart has recorded at least four species that are now extinct or extinct in the wild, "including the northern white rhinoceros and the Panamanian tree frog". However, he is particularly interested in birds and birdsong. He has recorded nearly every bird species in North America. Stewart has also recorded trees, which produce infrequent sounds outside of human hearing ranges. He adjusts the recordings after the fact so the pitches are audible to human listeners.

Although he has made recordings in more than 60 countries, Stewart has an affinity for Scotland, which he attributes to his Scottish biological father.

Many of Stewart's recordings have been made primarily out of love for nature and wildlife, although at times he has made his recordings more political. For example, Stewart's work helped to expose "the illegal slaughter of seals on Namibia's Skeleton Coast," with Stewart both trespassing and having a confrontation with police in the process of making recordings of the breeding colonies on the coast. Stewart's recordings have also been involved with investigations regarding "fox-hunting practices in England; the shark fin trade in China...; shark finning and illegal fishing in Mozambique; the slaughter of dolphins in Taiji, Japan...; the bear-bile trade in Vietnam; dog-meat farms in South Korea; [and] bullfighting in Spain".

His recordings have been used in about 150 films.

=== Albums ===
In 2024, he released the album Imperfect Cadence with Scottish singer Robert Shields. The album utilizes recordings Stewart made in Scotland in the 1970s.

In 2025, he released a "bird opera" called "Wild Concerto" with Stewart Copeland. The field recordings used in the album include Arctic terns, wolves, frogs, a black-footed albatross, and an Asian barred owlet.

== Personal life ==
Stewart was born in Birmingham. His childhood "was poverty stricken, marked by stretches without electricity or food". He is a lifelong atheist and a vegan, with the exception of cow's milk in his tea. He was diagnosed with bone cancer in December 2020.
