= Marc Polymeropoulos =

American intelligence officer

- Born: Marc E. Polymeropoulos; Athens, Greece
- Education: Cornell University
- Occupation: Intelligence officer
- Known for: Possible Havana syndrome carrier

Marc E. Polymeropoulos is a former American intelligence officer who served 26 years in the Central Intelligence Agency's Directorate of Operations, retiring in June 2019 as a member of the Senior Intelligence Service. His final position was overseeing CIA clandestine operations in Europe and Eurasia. He is one of the individuals who have reported symptoms consistent with Havana syndrome and has been a public advocate for affected intelligence officers.

== Early life ==
Polymeropoulos was born in Athens, Greece, to a Greek father and Jewish-American mother. He moved to the United States shortly after his birth.

== Career ==
Polymeropoulos served multiple overseas assignments as chief of station and deputy chief of station in Europe, Asia, and high-threat environments. He specialized in counterterrorism, the Middle East, and South Asia, serving extensively in Iraq and Afghanistan. He received the Distinguished Career Intelligence Medal, the Distinguished Intelligence Medal, the Intelligence Medal of Merit, and the Intelligence Commendation Medal.

Polymeropoulos holds undergraduate and graduate degrees from Cornell University.

== Havana syndrome ==
In December 2017, while serving as deputy chief of CIA clandestine operations for Europe and Eurasia, he traveled to Moscow on official business. He reported waking in his hotel room experiencing vertigo, nausea, and ringing in his ears. The symptoms persisted after his return to the United States, and he was eventually diagnosed with occipital neuralgia.

He stated that the CIA's Office of Medical Services initially determined his symptoms were not consistent with those of diplomats affected in Havana. He retired from the CIA in 2019, citing his inability to work due to persistent headaches. He has publicly attributed his condition to a possible directed-energy attack and has called for greater government support for affected officers. He was a key public advocate for the HAVANA Act of 2021, which provided compensation to affected personnel and passed unanimously in both chambers of Congress.

Polymeropoulos has been featured in major investigative reporting on Havana syndrome, including Julia Ioffe's 2020 GQ investigation "The Mystery of the Immaculate Concussion" and the CBS News 60 Minutes investigation.

He has also briefed the Senate Select Committee on Intelligence and House Permanent Select Committee on Intelligence on anomalous health incidents.

== Post-CIA career ==
After retiring, he authored Clarity in Crisis: Leadership Lessons from the CIA, published by HarperCollins in June 2021. The book was reviewed by the CIA's Center for the Study of Intelligence.

He is a nonresident senior fellow at the Atlantic Council's Scowcroft Center for Strategy and Security, specializing in hybrid warfare. He has written for The Washington Post, The New York Times, Politico, Foreign Affairs, and Lawfare, and contributes a weekly column to the Washington Examiner. He has appeared on PBS NewsHour, CNN, NPR, MSNBC, and BBC.

== Hunter Biden laptop letter ==
In October 2020, he co-drafted with former acting CIA director Michael Morell a public letter stating that emails from a laptop belonging to Hunter Biden, reported by the New York Post, had "all the classic earmarks of a Russian information operation." The letter was signed by 51 former intelligence officials.

In April 2023, he testified before the House Judiciary Committee and House Permanent Select Committee on Intelligence in a transcribed interview. He stated that Morell told him that "someone from kind of the Biden world had asked for this". He testified that he believed Joe Biden mischaracterized the letter when citing it during a presidential debate, and acknowledged the authenticity of the laptop's contents.

On January 20, 2025, President Donald Trump signed an executive order revoking the security clearances of the letter's signatories.
