= James Densley =

British-American sociologist (born 1982)

- Born: 13 April 1982 (age 44); Leicester, England
- Education: University of Oxford; University of Northampton; Pace University
- Alma mater: St. Antony's College, Oxford
- Occupation: Professor
- Employer: Metropolitan State University
- Known for: Gang Research; Criminology; Sociology
- Awards: 2022 Minnesota Book Awards; 2017 Points of Light
- Website: jamesdensley.com

James Densley (born 13 April 1982) is a British-American sociologist and Professor of Criminology and Criminal Justice at Metropolitan State University. He is best known as co-founder of The Violence Prevention Project and as co-author of the bestselling book, The Violence Project: How To Stop a Mass Shooting Epidemic. In addition to his research on gun violence, Densley has published extensively on gangs and has been described as "among the most accomplished rising leaders of modern gang research in criminology." He was ranked among the top 2% of scientists and 150 most cited criminologists worldwide in 2025.

Densley is noted for his ethnographic study of gang life in London and for applying economic signalling theory to gang membership. Densley's research examines group processes in gangs and compares them with other violent collectives, including hate groups and terror groups. He has likened the Islamic State to a “street gang on steroids.” His work also addresses the “glocalisation” of gang culture, cyber violence, and the influence of rap music and social media on gang-related violence.

== Early life and education ==
James Densley was born in Leicester, England, the son of a Leicestershire special constable. He received a B.A. in sociology with American studies from the University of Northampton in 2003, followed by an M.Sc. in sociology from the University of Oxford in 2004. He then moved to New York City, where he joined the NYC Teaching Fellows program and taught special education for grades 7 and 8 at University Neighborhood Middle School in the Lower East Side of Manhattan. During this period, he earned a teaching license and a master's degree in education from Pace University.

In 2007, Densley returned to England to pursue a D.Phil. in sociology at the University of Oxford's Extra-Legal Governance Institute. He studied under mafia scholars Diego Gambetta and Federico Varese, whose research on organized crime influenced his own work on social organization, theory, and method.

== Career ==
After completing his D.Phil. in 2011, Densley joined the faculty of Metropolitan State University in Minnesota. He was promoted to full professor in 2019 at the age of 37.

The 2011 England riots took place shortly after Densley finished his doctoral research on gangs in London. When Prime Minister David Cameron attributed the riots to gangs, Densley was among the first academics to question that claim. His first book, How Gangs Work, grew out of his D.Phil., and examined the “war on gangs” launched in the aftermath of the riots. A review in The British Journal of Criminology described the book as “critical ethnography and first-class fieldwork,” concluding that “Densley's work points the way to how gang research should be done in the future.”

In the book and in later research, Densley used signaling theory to make sense of how and why youth join gangs. He found that prospective gang members signal their potential value to the gang by engaging in violent and criminal acts that are beyond the capacity of most people. Densley also used signaling theory to advance a model of disengagement from gangs that allows ex-gang members to communicate their unobservable inner change to others and satisfy community expectations that desistance from crime is real. For Densley, religious conversion in prison was one example of a disengagement signal.

Densley's work explores the rationality of gang behavior. He developed a model of gang evolution explaining the relationship between gangs and organized crime. The model proposes that recreation, crime, enterprise, and governance are not fixed gang types, but sequential "actualization stages" in the gang lifecycle. Subsequent studies of gangs in London and Glasgow provided empirical support for this framework.

Densley has also studied illicit drug markets. In 2012, he described the county lines model, in which urban gangs dispatch young or vulnerable members to sell drugs in smaller towns and commuter cities: “Most youngers are employed by their elders to work what was known colloquially as the ‘drugs line,’ although some are sent out ‘on assignment’ to explore ‘new markets’ in areas where they are unknown to police; notably commuter cities with vibrant nighttime economies”. Later research by Densley addressed debt bondage and child exploitation within county lines, and analyzed how expressive uses of social media, such as posting rap videos on YouTube, contribute to the commercial expansion of these networks.

== The Violence Project ==
In 2017, Densley and psychologist Jillian Peterson of Hamline University co-founded The Violence Project. Their first initiative, in partnership with the Minnetonka Police Department, was the development of a mental illness crisis intervention training for law enforcement known as the R-Model.

With funding from the National Institute of Justice, Densley and Peterson created a database of all public mass shooters since 1966 coded on more than 150 life history variables. Their research has examined K-12 school shootings and the influence of the Columbine High School massacre as a model for subsequent attacks. Densley and Peterson have also criticized active shooter drills in schools, arguing that such exercises can traumatize children and normalize violence.

In a viral 2019 op-ed for the Los Angeles Times, Densley and Peterson outlined a framework for understanding mass shootings. Drawing on interviews with perpetrators and their acquaintances, they identified four recurring themes: early childhood trauma, a crisis point involving suicidality, validation through the study of prior shootings, and access to firearms. They argue that addressing each factor—through firearm regulation, suicide prevention, social support, and limiting media contagion—can help prevent future attacks. This framework is expanded in their book, The Violence Project: How To Stop a Mass Shooting Epidemic, which "identifies 34 potential solutions" to the "uniquely American problem" of mass shootings. Their research has also emphasized that many mass shooters "leak" their intent beforehand as a cry for help, suggesting opportunities for early intervention.

The Violence Project continues to maintain open-source databases tracking mass public shootings, as well as homicides in schools, places of worship, college campuses, workplaces, and attacks on elected officials. Analyses of these data, including a Bloomberg report following the 2025 killing of conservative activist Charlie Kirk, have been used to highlight trends in political violence in the United States.

== Growing Against Violence ==
Densley is a co-founder of Growing Against Violence, a London-based charity established in 2008 that delivers violence prevention programs in schools. He wrote and piloted the original curriculum and later evaluated the program. In 2017, Densley received the Prime Minister's Points of Light award for volunteer service.

== Selected publications ==
Densley is a TEDx speaker and has written op-eds and commentary for CNN, Daily Mail, Education Week, The Guardian, The Hill, the Los Angeles Times, Newsweek, The New York Times, Scientific American, the Star Tribune, The Sun, Time, USA Today, The Wall Street Journal, and The Washington Post. His writing has addressed topics such as gangs, drug markets, school shootings, gun violence, knife crime, policing, and violent extremism.

His research and commentary have been featured on Last Week Tonight with John Oliver, and he has appeared on programs including, 60 Minutes, Andrea Mitchell Reports, BBC News, CBS This Morning, CNN Newsroom, Deadline: White House, Don Lemon Tonight, Dr. Phil, Face the Nation, Inside Edition, Morning Joe, The New Yorker Radio Hour, NBC Nightly News, NPR, and PBS NewsHour.

- The Oxford Handbook of Gangs and Society (Oxford University Press, 2024). With David Pyrooz and John Leverso.
- The Conversation on Guns (Johns Hopkins University Press, 2023).
- Police, Prosecutors, Courts, and the Constitution (Springer, 2023). With Charles MacLean.
- Contesting County Lines (Bristol University Press, 2023). With Robert McLean and Carlton Brick.
- On Gangs (Temple University Press, 2022). With Scott Decker and David Pyrooz.
- Robbery in the Illegal Drugs Trade (Bristol University Press, 2022). With Robert McLean.
- The Violence Project: How to Stop a Mass Shooting Epidemic (Abrams Press, 2021). With Jillian Peterson.
- Scotland's Gang Members (Palgrave Macmillan, 2020). With Robert McLean.
- County Lines (Springer, 2019). With Robert McLean and Grace Robinson.
- Minnesota's Criminal Justice System (Carolina Academic Press, 2016). With Jeff Bumgarner and Susan Hilal.
- How Gangs Work (Palgrave Macmillan, 2013).

== Awards ==
- Minnesota Book Awards (General Nonfiction), 2022
- Points of Light Award, 2017
- National Gang Crime Research Center's Frederick Milton Thrasher Award, 2013
- Fellow of the Royal Society of Arts, 2014.

== Popular culture ==
The character Jamie Patterson in the spy novel Jihadi Apprentice by David Bruns and J.R. Olson is based on Densley.
