= Enrico Gennari =

Italian marine biologist

- Born: 21 January 1977 (age 49); Rome, Italy
- Occupation: Marine biologist
- Website: Enrico Gennari

Enrico Gennari (born 21 January 1977) is an Italian marine biologist who specialises in the study of the great white shark.

== Early life and education ==
Gennari was born in Rome in 1977. He has said that he was intending to study the great white shark from the age of six.

He received a master's degree in Natural Science from the Sapienza University of Rome in February 2004, magna cum laude. His degree thesis was on a vertebral ageing study of Etmopterus spinax, a bottom-dwelling shark typical of the Mediterranean Sea, creating a new technique to "read" very difficult vertebrae for the first time.

Gennari took a year break in Ustica, near Sicily, working as a scuba diving instructor, then worked for nine months in 2005, studying the behaviour of white sharks, including their nighttime predatory behaviour.

Gennari then enrolled at Rhodes University for his PhD study on the thermo physio-ecology of white sharks, under the supervision of Paul Cowley from SAIAB. Meanwhile, he established a non-governmental marine research institute focused on marine megafauna, called the Oceans Research Institute. Gennari got his PhD in 2015.

He is the Director of Research at Oceans Research Institute in Mossel Bay, an Honorary Research Associate of the South African Institute for Aquatic Biodiversity (SAIAB), a research associate at Rhodes University’s Department of Ichthyology and Fisheries Science (DIFS) and Adjunct Senior Researcher within the Institute for Marine and Antarctic Studies, at the University of Tasmania. He is one of the founding members of the South African White Shark Research Group (SAWSRG). he was nominated by the South African Department of Forestry, Fisheries and the Environment for both the Shark Advisory Group and the Marine Mammal Technical Committee for the Top Predator Scientific Working Group.

He has published 30 peer-reviewed papers, including in Nature. He has supervised 3 PhD, 9 MSc and 4 BSc (Hon) students, in collaboration with the University of Pretoria, the University of Cape Town, Rhodes University, Stellenbosch University, University of Tasmania (AUS), University of Brussels (Belgium) and Dalhousie University (Canada).

== Television appearances ==
- 2006 Discovery Channel: After the Attack
- 2007 Discovery Channel: Shark Tribe
- 2007 National Geographic Channel: Sharkville
- 2008: French television show Thalassa (France 3).
- 2008: “Predator X” on Discovery’s History Channel.
- 2008: Oceans Research’s scientist Enrico Gennari interviewed for the BBC news channel and the BBC website about the research that Oceans Research carries out in Mossel Bay and the possible interaction between water users and white sharks.
- 2008: Enrico was interviewed for BBC article “How to measure a Great White's bite” by Jonah Fisher: https://news.bbc.co.uk/2/hi/africa/7759945.stm https://news.bbc.co.uk/2/hi/africa/7759377.stm
- 2009: “The beauty and the Shark” by Florian Guthknecht, ARD, 1. German Public TV (2009 )
- 2009: “Orcas: the sea wolves”, producer “Pangolin”, broadcaster “Discovery Channel”
- 2010: Channel Four: Inside Nature's Giants- Episode: The Great White Shark” producer “Windfall”, broadcaster “Channel 4 UK and National Geographic”
- 2012: “Shark Wranglers” History Channel
- 2015: “The White Shark”. NHK Japanese Broadcasting.
- 2021: The CNN’s Inside Africa featured Oceans Research Institute of Mossel Bay as one of the country’s main marine research, conservation and training hub: link

== Scientific articles ==
- Kock A., Johnson R.L., Bester M.N., Compagno L., Cliff G., Dudley S., Gennari E., Griffiths C.L., Kotze D., Laroche K., Meyer M.A., Oosthuizen W.H. and Swanson S., 2006. White shark abundance: not a causative factor in numbers of shark bite incidents. In: Finding a balance: white shark conservation and recreational safety in the inshore waters of Cape Town, South Africa. D.C. Nel and T.P. Peschak Eds. WWF South Africa Report Series - 2006/Marine/001
- Gennari E. and Scacco U., 2007. First age and growth estimates in the deep water shark, Etmopterus spinax (Linnaeus, 1758), by deep coned vertebral analysis. Marine Biology 152 (5): 1207-1214. https://doi.org/10.1007/s00227-007-0769-y
- Johnson R., Bester M.N., Dudley S., Oosthuizen W.H., Meÿer M., Hancke L. and Gennari E., 2009. Coastal swimming patterns of white sharks (Carcharodon carcharias) at Mossel Bay, South Africa. Environmental Biology of Fish 85: 189-200. https://doi.org/10.1007/s10641-009-9477-4
- Gubili C., Johnson R., Gennari E., Oosthuizen W.H., Kotze D., Meÿer M., Sims D., Jones C.S., Swanson S. and Noble L.R., 2009. Concordance of genetic and fin photo identification in the Great White Shark. Marine Biology 156 (10): 2199–2207. https://doi.org/10.1007/s00227-009-1233-y
- Jewell O.J.D., Wcisel M.A., Gennari E., Towner A.V., Bester M.N., Johnson R.L., Singh S., 2011. Effects of smart position only (SPOT) tag deployment on white sharks Carcharodon carcharias in South Africa. PLoS ONE 6 (11): e27242. https://doi.org/10.1371/journal.pone.0027242
- Delaney D.G., Johnson R., Bester M.N. and Gennari E., 2012. Accuracy of using visual identification of white sharks to estimate residency patterns. PLoS ONE 7(4): e34753. https://doi.org/10.1371/journal.pone.0034753
- Jewell O.J.D., Johnson R.L., Gennari E. and Bester M.N., 2013. Fine-scale movements and activity areas of white sharks (Carcharodon carcharias) in Mossel Bay, South Africa. Environmental Biology of Fish 96: 881–894. https://doi.org/10.1007/s10641-012-0084-4
- James B.S., Bester M.N., Penry G.S., Gennari E. and Elwen S.H., 2015. Abundance and degree of residency of humpback dolphins Sousa plumbea in Mossel Bay, South Africa. African Journal of Marine Science 37 (3): 383-394. https://doi.org/10.2989/1814232x.2015.1083477
- Kempster R.M., Egeberg C.A., Hart N.S., Ryan L., Chapuis L., Kerr C.C., Schmidt C., Huveneers C., Gennari E., Yopak K.E., Meeuwig J.J. and Collin S.P., 2016. How close is too close? The effect of a non-lethal electric shark deterrent on white shark behaviour. PLoS ONE 11(7): e0157717. https://doi.org/10.1371/journal.pone.0157717
- Findlay R., Gennari E., Cantor M. And Tittensor D.P., 2016. How solitary are white sharks: social interactions or just spatial proximity? Behavioural Ecology and Sociobiology 70 (10): 1735-1744. https://doi.org/10.1007/s00265-016-2179-y
- Irion D.T., Noble L.R., Kock A.A., Gennari E., Dicken M.L., Hewitt A.M., Towner A.V., Booth A.J., Smale M.J. and Cliff G., 2017. Pessimistic assessment of white shark population status in South Africa: Comment on Andreotti et al. (2016). Marine Ecology Progress Series (577): 251–25. https://doi.org/10.3354/meps12283
- Ryan L.A., Chapuis L., Hemmi J.M., Collin S.P., McCauley R., Yopak K.E., Gennari E., Huveneers C., Kempster R.M., Kerr C.C., Schmidt C., Egeberg C.A. and Hart N.S., 2018. Effects of auditory and visual stimuli on shark feeding behaviour: the disco effect. Marine Biology 165 (11). https://doi.org/10.1007/s00227-017-3256-0
- Vermeulen E., Bouveroux T., Plön S., Atkins S., Chivell W., Cockcroft V., Conry D., Gennari E., Hörbst S., James B.S., Kirkman S., Penry G., Pistorius P., Thornton M., Vargas-Fonseca O.A. and Elwen S.H., 2018. Indian Ocean humpback dolphin (Sousa plumbea) movement patterns along the South African coast. Aquatic Conservation: Marine and Freshwater Ecosystems 28:231–24. https://doi.org/10.1002/aqc.2836
- Maduna S.N., Van Wyk J.H., Da Silva C., Gennari E. and Bester-Van Der Merwe A.E., 2018. Evidence for sperm storage in common smoothhound shark Mustelus mustelus and paternity assessment in a single litter from South Africa. Journal of Fish Biology. https://doi.org/10.1111/jfb.13565
- Kuguru G., Maduna S., da Silva C., Gennari E., Rhode C. and Bester-van der Merwe A., 2018. DNA barcoding of chondrichthyans in South African fisheries. Fisheries Research 206: 292–295. https://doi.org/10.1016/j.fishres.2018.05.023
- Gennari E., Johnson R.L. and Cowley P.D., 2018. Performance and reliability of active acoustic biotelemetry to best track marine pelagic species in temperate coastal waters. Marine Biology 165:128. https://doi.org/10.1007/s00227-018-3384-1
- Huveneers C., Apps K., Becceri-Garcia E.E., Bruce B., Butcher P.A., Carlisle A., Chapple T., Christiansen H., Cliff G., Curtis T., Daly-Engel T., Dewar H., Dicken M., Domeier M., Duffy C., Ford R., French G., Francis M., Galvan-Magana F., García-Rodríguez E., Gennari E., Graham B., Hayden B., Hoyos-Parilla M., Hussey N.E., Jewell O., Jorgensen S., Kock A., Lowe C., Lyons K., Meyer L.C., Oelofse G., Oñate-González E.C., Oosthuizen H., O'Sullivan J., Ramm K., Skomal G., Sloan S., Smale M., Sosa-Nishizaki O., Sperone E., Tamburin E., Towner A., Wcisel M., Weng K., and Werry J.M., 2018. Future research directions on the ‘elusive’ white shark. Frontiers in Marine Science, section Marine Megafauna https://doi.org/10.3389/fmars.2018.00455
- Egeberg C.A., Kempster R.M., Hart N.S., Ryan L., Chapuis L., Kerr C.C., Schmidt C., Gennari E., Yopak K.E. and Collin S.P., 2019. Not all electric shark deterrents are made equal: Effects of a commercial electric anklet deterrent on white shark behaviour. PLoS ONE 14 (3): e0212851. https://doi.org/10.1371/journal.pone.0212851
- Chapuis L., Collin S.P., Yopak K.E., McCauley R.D., Kempster R.M., Ryan L.A., Schmidt C., Kerr C.C., Gennari E., Egeberg C.A. and Hart N.S., 2019. The effect of underwater sounds on shark behaviour. Scientific Reports 9(1): 6924. https://doi.org/10.1038/s41598-019-43078-w
- Morse P., Mole M.A., Bester M.N., Johnson R., Scacco U. and Gennari E., 2019. Cape fur seals (Arctocephalus pusillus pusillus) adjust traversing behaviour with lunar conditions in the high white shark (Carcharodon carcharias) density waters of Mossel Bay, South Africa. Marine Ecology Progress Series 622: 219-230. https://doi.org/10.3354/meps13051
- Queiroz, N., Humphries, N.E., Couto, A., Vedor, M., da Costa, I., Sequeira, A.M.M., Mucientes, G., Santos, A.M., Abascal, F.J., Abercrombie, D.L., Abrantes, K., Acuña-Marrero, D., Afonso, A.S., Afonso, P., Anders, D., Araujo, G., Arauz, R., Bach, P., Barnett, A., Bernal, D., Berumen, M.L., Bessudo Lion, S., Bezerra, N.P.A., Blaison, A.V., Block, B.A., Bond, M.E., Bradford, R.W., Braun, C.D., Brooks, E.J., Brooks, A., Brown, J., Bruce, B.D., Byrne, M.E., Campana, S.E., Carlisle, A.B., Chapman, D.D., Chapple, T.K., Chisholm, J., Clarke, C.R., Clua, E.G., Cochran, J.E.M., Crochelet, E.C., Dagorn, L., Daly, R., Devia Cortés, D., Doyle, T.K., Drew, M., Duffy, C.A.J., Erikson, T., Espinoza, E., Ferreira, L.C., Ferretti, F., Filmalter, J.D., Fischer, C.G., Fitzpatrick, R., Fontes, J., Forget, F., Fowler, M., Francis, M.P., Gallagher, A.J., Gennari, E., Goldsworthy, S.D., Gollock, M.J., Green, J.R., Gustafson, J.A., Guttridge, T.L., Guzman, H.M., Hammerschlag, N., Harman, L., Hazin, F.H.V., Heard, M., Hearn, A.R., Holdsworth, J.C., Holmes, B.J., Howey, L.A., Hoyos, M., Hueter, R.E., Hussey, N.E., Huveneers, C., Irion, D.T., Jacoby, D.M.P., Jewell, O.J.D., Johnson, R., Jordan, L.K.B., Jorgensen, S.J., Joyce, W., Keating Daly, C.A., Ketchum, J.T., Klimley, A.P., Kock, A.A., Koen, P., Ladino, F., Lana, F.O., Lea, J.S.E., Llewellyn, F., Lyon, W.S., MacDonnell, A., Macena, B.C.L., Marshall, H., McAllister, J.D., McAuley, R., Meÿer, M.A., Morris, J.J., Nelson, E.R., Papastamatiou, Y.P., Patterson, T.A., Peñaherrera-Palma, C., Pepperell, J.G., Pierce, S.J., Poisson, F., Quintero, L.M., Richardson, A., Rogers, P.J., Rohner, C.A., Rowat, D.R.L., Samoilys, M., Semmens, J.M., Sheaves, M., Shillinger, G., Shivji, M., Singh, S., Skomal, G.B., Smale, M.J., Snyders, L.B., Soler, G., Soria, M., Stehfest, K.M., Stevens, J.D., Thorrold, S.R., Tolotti, M.T., Towner, A., Travassos, P, Tyminski, J.P., Vandeperre, F., Vaudo, J.J., Watanabe, Y.Y., Weber, S.B., Wetherbee, B.M., White, T.D., Williams, S., Zárate, P.M., Harcourt, R., Hays, G.C., Meekan, M.G., Thums, M., Irigoien, X., Eguiluz, V.M., Duarte, C.M., Sousa, L.L., Simpson, S.J., Southall, E.J. and Sims, D.W., 2019. Global spatial risk assessment of sharks under the footprint of fisheries. Nature, https://doi.org/10.1038/s41586-019-1444-4
- Lucrezi S., Ellis S. and Gennari E., 2019. A test of causative and moderator effects in human perceptions of sharks, their control and framing. Marine Policy 109: 103687. https://doi.org/10.1016/j.marpol.2019.103687
- Grusd S.P., Moloney C.L., Distiller G., Watson R.G.A., Cowley P.D. and Gennari E., 2019. Using mark-recapture methods to estimate population size and survival of pyjama sharks Poroderma africanum in Mossel Bay, South Africa. African Journal of Marine Science. https://doi.org/10.2989/1814232X.2019.1670263
- Gennari E., Kock A., Smale M., Towner A., Khan N., Bester L., Johnson R., Fischer C., Meÿer M. and Morse P, 2019. Antibiotic sensitivity of bacterial flora isolated from the oral cavities of live white sharks (Carcharodon carcharias) in South African waters. South African Journal of Science https://doi.org/10.17159/sajs.2019/5972
- Kuguru G., Gennari E., Wintner S., Dicken M.L., Klein J.D., Rhode C. and Bester-van der Merwe A.E., 2019. Spatio-temporal genetic variation of juvenile smooth hammerhead sharks in South Africa. Marine Biology Research. https://doi.org/10.1080/17451000.2019.1695058
- Dines S.F. and Gennari E., 2019. First observations of white sharks (Carcharodon carcharias) attacking a live humpback whale (Megaptera novaeangliae). Marine and Freshwater Research. https://doi.org/10.1071/MF19291
- Seakamela S.M., Hofmeyr G., Vermeulen E., Meyer M., Olbers J., Dicken M., Thompson G., Gennari E., Atkins S., Neveceralova P., Versfeld D., Penry G., Harris J. and Findlay K., 2020. South African Cetacean Research. IWC Scientific Progress Report 2019
- van Staden M., Gledhill K.S., Gennari E., McCord M., Parkinson M., Watson R., Rhode C. and Bester-van der Merwe A.E., 2020. Microsatellite development and detection of admixture among three sympatric Haploblepharus species (Carcharhiniformes: Scyliorhinidae). Aquatic Conservation: Marine and Freshwater Ecosystems. https://doi.org/10.1002/aqc.3406
- Scarponi V., Gennari E. and Hughes W., 2021. Physiological response to capture stress in endemic Southern African catsharks (Family Scyliorhinidae). Journal of Fish Biology 2021 https://doi.org/10.1111/jfb.14710
- Lucrezi S. and Gennari E., 2021. Perceptions of shark hazard mitigation at beaches implementing lethal and nonlethal shark control programs. Society & Animals no. aop (2021): 1-22. https://doi.org/10.1163/15685306-BJA10046
- Ryan L.A., Slip D.G., Chapuis L., Collin S.P., Gennari E., Hemmi J.M., How M.J., Huveneers C., Peddemors V.M., Tosetto L. and Hart N.S., 2021. A shark's eye view: testing the 'mistaken identity theory' behind shark bites on humans. Journal of the Royal Society Interface. https://doi.org/10.1098/rsif.2021.0533
- Klein J.D., Asbury T.A., da Silva C., Hull K.L., Dicken M.L., Gennari E., Maduna S. and Bester-van der Merwe A.E., 2021. Shallow genetic divergence and high site fidelity in the common smoothhound shark Mustelus mustelus confirmed by genetic and tag-recapture data. Journal of Fish Biology doi:10.1111/jfb.14926
- Plön S., Atkins S., Cockcroft V., Conry D., Dines S., Elwen S., Gennari E., Gopal K., Gridley T., Hörbst S., James B.S., Penry G., Thornton M., Vargas-Fonseca O.A., Vermeulen E., 2021. Science Alone Won’t Do It! South Africa’s Endangered Humpback Dolphins Sousa plumbea Face Complex Conservation Challenges. Frontiers in Marine Science 8 DOI=10.3389/fmars.2021.642226
- Queiroz N., Humphries N.E., Couto A. B.M., Gennari E. et al. 2021. Reply to: Shark mortality cannot be assessed by fishery overlap alone. Nature 595, E8–E16 doi.org/10.1038/s41586-021-03397-3
- Queiroz N., Humphries N.E., Couto A. B.M., Gennari E. et al. 2021. Reply to: Caution over the use of ecological big data for conservation. Nature 595, E20–E28 doi.org/10.1038/s41586-021-03464-9
- Kock A.A., Lombard A.T., Daly R., Goodall V., Meÿer M., Johnson R., Fischer C., Koen P., Irion D., Gennari E., Towner A., Jewell O.J.D., da Silva C., Dicken M.L., Smale M.J. and Photopoulou T., 2022. Sex and size influence the spatiotemporal distribution of white sharks, with implications for interactions with fisheries and spatial management in the Southwest Indian Ocean. Frontiers in Marine Science 2022 (9). Doi: 10.3389/fmars.2022.811985.
- Towner A.V., Watson RGA, Kock A.A., Papastamatiou Y., Sturup M., Gennari E., Baker K., Booth T., Dicken M., Chivell W., Elwen S., Kaschke T., Edwards D. and Smale M.J., 2022. Fear at the top: killer whale predation drives white shark absence at South Africa’s largest aggregation site. African Journal of Marine Science 44(1): 1–14.
- Gennari E., Irion D, Cowley P.D., 2022. Active acoustic telemetry reveals ontogenetic habitat‑related variations in the coastal movement ecology of the white shark. Animal Biotelemetry 10: 25 https://rdcu.be/cTCHF
- Bowlby H.D, Hammerschlag N., Irion D.T. and Gennari E., 2022. How continuing mortality affects recovery potential for prohibited sharks: The case of white sharks in South Africa. Frontiers in Conservation Science 90: https://t.co/ODRPHGnMWN
- Faure-Beaulieu N., Lombard A.T., Olbers J., Goodall V., da Silva C., Daly R., Jordaan G., Kerwath S.E., Kock A., Mann B.Q., Murray T.S., Albano P., Cliff G., dos Santos N.A., Gennari E., Hammerschlag N., Bester-van der Merwe A.E., Watson R., Andreotti S., Bernard A.T.F., Cowley P., De Vos L., Drobniewska N., Elston C., Fallows C., Rogers T.D., Smith G., van Staden M., de Villiers P., Paulet T.G. and Harris J., 2023. A systematic conservation plan identifying critical areas for improved chondrichthyan protection in South Africa. Biological Conservation 284, p. 110163. https://doi.org/10.1016/j.biocon.2023.110163
- van Staden M., Ebert D.A., Gennari E., Leslie R.W., McCord M.E., Parkinson M., Watson R.G., Wintner S., da Silva C. and Bester-van der Merwe A.E., 2023. Molecular taxonomy of South Africa’s catsharks: how far have we come? Diversity 15(7): 828. doi.org/10.3390/d15070828
- Williams L., Lucrezi S., Cowley P. and Gennari E., 2023. Stakeholders’ perceptions of the conservation and management of elasmobranchs in South Africa. Marine Policy 157: 105847. doi.org/10.1016/j.marpol.2023.105847
- Trotter A.W., Rathjens L., Schmiegel S., Mews S., Cowley P.D., Gennari E., 2023. Short-term effects of standard procedures associated with surgical transmitter implantation on a benthic shark species requiring anaesthesia. Fisheries Research 270: 106880. doi.org/10.1016/j.fishres.2023.106880
- Scacco U., Gennari E., Di Crescenzo S. and Fanelli E., 2023. Looking into the prevalence of bycatch juveniles of critically endangered elasmobranchs: a case study from pelagic longline and trammel net fisheries of the Asinara Gulf (western Mediterranean). Frontiers in Marine Science 10: 1303961. doi.org/10.3389/fmars.2023.1303961
- Towner A., Micarelli P., Hurwitz D., Smale M.J., Booth A.J., Stopforth C., Jacobs E., Reinero F.R., Ricci V., Di Bari A., Gavazzi, S., Carugno G., Mahrer M. and Gennari E., 2024. Further insights into killer whales Orcinus orca preying on white sharks Carcharodon carcharias in South Africa. African Journal of Marine Science, pp. 1–5. doi.org/10.2989/1814232X.2024.2311272
- Gennari E., Hammerschlag N., Andreotti S., Fallows C., Fallows M., and Braccini M., 2024. Uncertainty remains for white sharks in South Africa, as population stability and redistribution cannot be concluded by Bowlby et al.(2023):“Decline or shifting distribution? a first regional trend assessment for white sharks (Carcharodon carcharias) in South Africa. Ecological Indicators, 160, 111810. doi.org/10.1016/j.ecolind.2024.111810
- Wagner C.I., Smolina I., Koop M.E., Bal T., Lizano A.M., Choo L.Q., Hofreiter M., Gennari E., de Sabata E., Shivji M.S. and Noble L., 2024. Genome analysis reveals three distinct lineages of the cosmopolitan white shark. Current Biology. 2024 Aug 5. doi.org/10.1016/j.cub.2024.06.076
- Caracausi L., Da Ros Z., Premici A., Gennari E. and Fanelli E., 2024. Trophic ecology of the pyjama shark Poroderma africanum (Gmelin, 1789) elucidated by stable isotopes. Animals 2004 doi.org/10.3390/ani14172559
- Ryan, L.A., Gennari, E., Slip, D.J., Collin, S.P., Peddemors, V.M., Huveneers, C., Chapuis, L., Hemmi, J.M. and Hart, N.S., 2024. Counterillumination reduces bites by Great White sharks. Current Biology. doi.org/10.1016/j.cub.2024.10.042
