= Angola Prison Rodeo =

Prison rodeo in Louisiana, United States

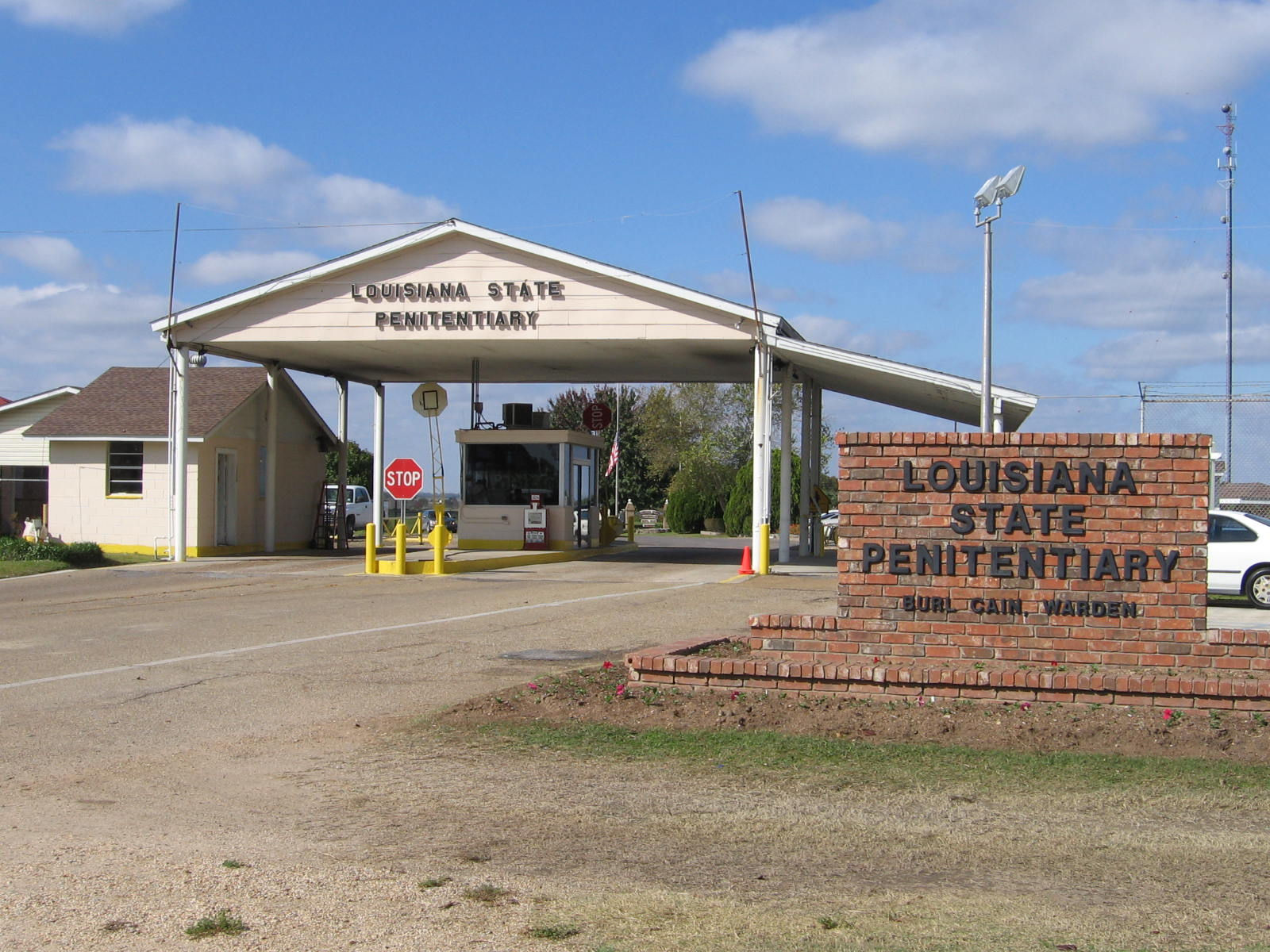
Louisiana State Penitentiary, the site of the rodeo

The Angola Prison Rodeo, staged at the Louisiana State Penitentiary since 1965, is the longest running prison rodeo in the United States.

It is held on one weekend in April and on every Sunday in October. On each occasion, thousands of visitors enter the prison complex. Various prisoner organizations sell food at concession stands. Many of the prisoners use family recipes to craft the concession stand food. Prison guards conduct the financial transactions at the Angola Rodeo.

As part of the prison rodeo, there is a semiannual Arts and Crafts Festival. Prisoners make handmade work. Melissa Schrift, author of Angola Prison Art: Captivity, Creativity, and Consumerism, wrote that "In addition to introducing innovations into vernacular prison art forms, Angola inmates find enormous value in creating works that embody or mimic the everyday images and goods so readily available in the outside world."

The rodeo raises funds for religious educational programs for prisoners. As of 2013, each spring rodeo raises $450,000. The rodeo's slogan is "the wildest show in the South".

== History ==
The idea of the rodeo was born in 1964. The Rodeo, a collaboration between prisoners and prison employees, began in 1965. Cathy Fontenot, the Assistant Warden, said that originally prisoners and staff backed pickup trucks into a field "and would go out there and play around on horses." Both horses and cattle are bred and raised at the prison. The horses are used by trustees to supervise field work, and the cattle are raised for sale as beef.

In 1967, LSP opened the Rodeo to outside spectators. Over the years, LSP erected bleachers and adopted the rules of the Professional Rodeo Cowboys Association. In addition the administration added an Arts and Crafts festival, and added stock animals and rodeo clowns. The current 10,000-person stadium opened in 2000.

Inmate Jack Favor, a former rodeo star from Texas, worked to establish the rodeo. He was wrongly convicted of two murders in Bossier Parish and sentenced to life at Angola. He sought to instill self-discipline in the prisoners and formed a chapter of the Fellowship of Christian Athletes. Prison authorities permitted Favor to travel across the state to promote the event. Favor earmarked funds raised through the rodeo to finance emergency trips for inmates, under guard.

The rodeo is still operating and is the oldest prison rodeo in the United States; the Texas Prison Rodeo started in 1931 but was closed in 1986.

The prison rodeo went on hiatus in 2020 prompted by the COVID-19 pandemic. The rodeo reopened in April 2022.

== Criticism ==
=== Cruelty ===
Some criticize the event for being inhumane and exploitative. For example, in 2013, the LSU Reveille published a piece calling the rodeo "reminiscent of the Roman gladiators (read: glorified slaves)" and "barbaric at best." Several events are specifically designed to endanger the lives of participating inmates, like the especially dangerous convict poker, where a bull is released with the sole purpose of unseating poker players, and the players must resist the urge to run away in order to win.

Some measures, like helmets, mouth guards, and vests, have been put in place to prevent serious injury. But injuries are still common, in part due to the fact that inmates receive no training before they participate.

While the event is voluntary and many inmates speak its praises, the chance to win cash prizes of up to $500 (in the case of the Guts & Glory event) is a strong economic incentive for inmates to put themselves in harm's way, especially since inmates' wages usually earn them between $0.02 and $0.75 an hour. Critics say the prize money compromises the voluntary nature of the event.

=== Finances ===
In 2017, the Angola rodeo's bank records for the last 10 years were audited following an earlier audit that showed mishandling.

An earlier audit found that $6.2 million in revenue from the rodeo in 2014 and 2015 was being kept in a private checking account instead of the Louisiana Department of Treasury. After this discovery, investigators realized that the rodeo's revenue had never been monitored by the state government since it began. The audit also discovered that funds had been improperly used to order a prison bus, and that $28,000 in concession sales between 2010 and 2015 had gone missing.

== Events ==
1. Grand Entry - Angola Rough Riders enter the arena at full gallop and colors are presented.
2. Bust Out - All six chutes open simultaneously, releasing six angry bulls, with temporarily attached inmate cowboys. The last man to remain on the bull wins the event.
3. Bareback Riding - Riders are expected to keep one hand in the air, and must stay on the horse for eight seconds to qualify.
4. Wild Horse Race - Six untrained horses are simultaneously released into the arena with short ropes dragging behind them. Three-man teams attempt to grab the ropes and hold the horse long enough for a team member to mount. The first team to cross the finish line while still on top of the horse is the winner.
5. Barrel Racing - This is the only event in which inmates do not participate. Sanctioned by the Professional Rodeo Cowboys Association, contestants race their horse in a pattern among three barrels. The fastest time wins.
6. Bull-Dogging - The animal is placed in a chute, with two cowboys positioned just outside the chute. Their job is to wrestle the animal to the ground as quickly as possible.
7. Buddy Pick-Up - This event requires one man on a horse (riding bareback) to navigate the length of the arena, pick up another inmate who is standing on a barrel, and race back to the finish line.
8. Wild Cow Milking - Teams of inmate cowboys chase the animals around the arena trying to extract a little milk. The first team to bring milk to the judge wins the prize.
9. Bull Riding - Inmates try to stay on top of a 2,000-pound Brahma bull. Riders are eligible for the title “All-Around Cowboy” when they stay on top for 6 seconds. The Professional Rodeo Cowboys Association rules govern this event.
10. Convict Poker - Four inmate cowboys sit at a table in the middle of the arena playing a game of poker. A bull is released with the sole purpose of unseating the poker players. The last man remaining seated is the winner.
11. Guts & Glory - A chit (poker chip) is tied to a Brahma bull. The object here is to get close enough to the bull to snatch the chip.

== Additional points of interest ==
- The Angola Prison Rodeo also includes an Arts and Crafts show, complete with concessions; all are produced by inmates.
- Writer/Director Jeff Smith entered the 2008 Jackson Hole Film Festival with his film Six Seconds of Freedom about the rodeo.
- Simeon Soffer directed the documentary Wildest Show in the South: the Angola Prison Rodeo, which won the 2000 International Documentary Association's Distinguished Achievement Award and was nominated for an Academy Award.
- The $450,000-a-day revenue brought in by the rodeo "pays for Baptist seminary classes at the prison, funerals for inmates, educational programs and maintenance of the prison's six chapels."
- In 2010, the Angola Prison Horse Sale was held along with the rodeo. It is the sale of horses bred and trained at the prison by inmates.
