= 60 Minutes season 56 =

Season of television series

60 Minutes
- Season 56
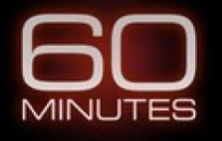
- Logo of 60 Minutes, a CBS news magazine television show broadcast continuously since 1968]
- No. of episodes: 30

Release
- Original network: CBS
- Original release: September 17, 2023 – May 19, 2024

Season chronology
- ← Previous; Season 55 Next → Season 57

60 Minutes's 56th season aired from September 17, 2023, to May 19, 2024. Full-time hosts include Lesley Stahl, Scott Pelley and Bill Whitaker. Reporters include Sharyn Alfonsi, Anderson Cooper, Cecilia Vega and Jon Wertheim. With additional reporting by Holly Williams in the Ukraine for episode 2 and 29, Norah O'Donnell in episodes 4, 19, 31 and 33, Jonathan LaPook in episodes 4 and 27, and Margaret Brennan in episode 6.

Season 56 introduced a new feature ending each episode called "The Last Minute". The one-minute editorial provides an update on a previous story. The episode with the highest ratings was the first episode of the season.

== Episodes ==
No. in season	Title	Original release date	Viewers (millions)
1	"President Zelenskyy; Into the Streets; Prime Time in Colorado"	September 17, 2023	11.800
Interview of Ukrainian President Volodymyr Zelenskyy by Scott Pelley; "Into the Street" Protests over 2023 Israeli judicial reform with interview of members from Brothers and Sisters in Arms and Yariv Levin, Deputy of the Prime Minister of Israel and Justice Minister, report by Lesley Stahl; "Prime Time in Colorado" interview of Colorado Buffaloes football coach Deion Sanders, with additional interviews of his two sons Shedeur and Shilo, and Rick George, athletic director for University of Colorado Boulder, report by Jon Wertheim; After airing of the segment on Coach Sanders, there was criticism of CBS News' portrayal of Jackson, Mississippi, home to Jackson State Tigers football, Sanders's prior team. Two coaches from Jackson State Tomekia Reed, coach of Jackson State Lady Tigers basketball and T. C. Taylor head coach for the football team, expressed concerns about the coverage.: "Last Minute" - Leslie Stahl introduced the new weekly feature.
2	"CARE Court; Bankrolling the War; Hanging On"	September 24, 2023	7.184
"CARE Court" Homelessness in California and Governor Gavin Newsom plan for addressing problem with a court system for people with mental illness and addiction called the Community Assistance, Recovery and Empowerment Court (CARE Court), report by Cecilia Vega; "Bankrolling the War" U.S. funding for Ukraine's response in Russo-Ukrainian War with interviews with members of Ukraine's 47th Mechanized Brigade and Ben Hodges, former commander of NATO's Allied Land Command and the U.S. Army in Europe, reported by Holly Williams; "Hanging On" - Rebecca Cliffe and Lucy Cooke experts on sloths describe the impacts of climate change on their natural environments and differences between two-toed and bradypus species, report by Sharyn Alfonsi
3	"Attorney General; The Rise and Fall of Sam Bankman-Fried"	October 1, 2023	6.886
Interview of Merrick Garland, United States Attorney General by Scott Pelley; "The Rise and Fall of Sam Bankman-Fried" Author Michael Lewis on his biography of Sam Bankman-Fried and the collapse of FTX cryptocurrency exchange, report by Jon Wertheim
4	"The Godfather of AI; General Milley; Rich Paul; 3D Printing"	October 8, 2023	9.682
"The Godfather of AI" interview of Geoffrey Hinton on potential threats of Artificial Intelligence and a future Technological singularity by Scott Pelley; "General Milley" interview of Mark Milley former Chairman of the Joint Chiefs of Staff by Norah O'Donnell; Interview with Rich Paul sports agent and founder Klutch Sports Group, report by Bill Whitaker; "3D Printing" 3D printing homes with company ICON, report by Lesley Stahl
5	"President Biden; Rescue at the Kibbutz; The 50"	October 15, 2023	7.289
Interview of President Biden at the White House on the escalating war in the Middle East, Russia's war in Ukraine, and the political paralysis on Capitol Hill by Scott Pelley; "Rescue at the Kibbutz" rescue during Nahal Oz attack with interviews of Noam and Gali Tibon, report by Lesley Stahl; "The 50" 50 migrants in Bexar County, Texas who were unexpectedly dropped off on the island of Martha's Vineyard, report by Sharyn Alfonsi
6	"The Five Eyes; A Prisoner of Iran; Pink; The Isle of Man "	October 22, 2023	9.907
"The Five Eyes" interview with intelligence leaders from Australia Mike Burgess, Canada David Vigneault, New Zealand Andrew Hampton, United Kingdom Ken McCallum and United States Christopher Wray, report by Scott Pelley; "A Prisoner of Iran" Emad Shargi freed from imprisonment in Iran as part of an Iran–United States prisoner release mediated by Qatar in September 2023, report by Margaret Brennan; Interview with Pink, pop singer, by Cecilia Vega; "The Isle of Man" Time Trial motorcycle race on Isle of Man with background on local culture including efforts to recover the Manx language, report by Bill Whitaker
7	"Vice President Harris; A Quiet Invasion; The Air We Breathe; The State of the Blues"	October 29, 2023	9.762
Interview with Vice President Harris by Bill Whitaker; "A Quiet Invasion" Accession of Georgia to the European Union with interview of Salome Zourabichvili, President of Georgia, and Russia's influence on Georgia since the 2008 Russo-Georgian War, report by Sharyn Alfonsi; "The Air We Breathe" how workplace air systems influence spread of viruses with interview of Linsey Marr, scientist who studies airborne pathogens, report by Jonathan LaPook; "The State of the Blues" Blues music resurgence in the Mississippi Delta with interview with Christone "Kingfish" Ingram and Morgan Freeman's Ground Zero Blues Club in Clarksdale, Mississippi at Juke Joint Festival, report by Jon Wertheim.
8	"John Eastman; Our Mistake Is Your Responsibility; Monkey Island"	November 5, 2023	7.393
Interview of John Eastman, former law professor who gave legal advice to former President Donald Trump, by Scott Pelley; "Our Mistake Is Your Responsibility" Impact of Social Security Administration errors that resulted in over payments with interviews of Laurence Kotlikoff and Terry Savage, report by Anderson Cooper; "Monkey Island" - Impact of Hurricane Maria on rhesus macaque monkeys on Cayo Santiago off the coast of Puerto Rico including a visit to research project by James Higham, NYU biologist, and Noah Snyder-Mackler, Arizona State University, report by Lesley Stahl
9	"Iran's Assassins; The Heritage War; Horse Racing Reform?"	November 12, 2023	8.130
"Iran's Assassins" - Professional assassins working for Iran to control critics with interviews of John Bolton, former National Security Advisor and Masih Alinejad, Iranian-American journalist, report by Leslie Stahl; "The Heritage War" - Russia's destruction of Ukrainian cultural institutions in Russian invasion of Ukraine with damage to Church of the Nativity of the Theotokos, Viazivka, report by Bill Whitaker; "Horse Racing Reform?" - national regulator Horseracing Integrity and Safety Authority, formed by the U. S. Congress in 2021, tasked with reforming Horse racing in the United States, report by Cecilia Vega
10	"Disappeared; The Stand; The Underboss; Africatown"	November 19, 2023	7.724
"Disappeared" - Rescuing Ukrainian children moved into Russian territory, one organization addressing Humanitarian impacts of the Russian invasion of Ukraine with interview of Mykola Kuleba, co-founder of Save Ukraine, report by Cecilia Vega; "The Stand" - Maui firefighters on their experiences in the 2023 Hawaii wildfires, report by Sharyn Alfonsi; "The Underboss" - interview with Steven Van Zandt, report by Jon Wertheim; "Africatown" - descendants from Clotilda, last known slave ship, report by Anderson Cooper. Follow-up from November 2020 report.
11	"Rise; Sealand; Ancient Vines"	November 26, 2023	8.415
"Rise" - charity summer camp for Ukraine widows and their children to climb in the Austrian alps with interview of Nathan Schmidt, climbing instructor and organization co-founder, report by Scott Pelley; "Sealand" self-proclaimed Principality of Sealand with interview of Mike Bates, son of micronation founder Paddy Roy Bates, report by Jon Wertheim; "Ancient Vines" Georgian wine with visit to Alaverdi Monastery, report by Sharyn Alfonsi
12	"Chaos on Campus; Quantum Computing; Greta Gerwig"	December 3, 2023	6.547
"Chaos on Campus" university students protest the Gaza war with approach used at Dartmouth College with interviews of Ezzedine Choukri Fishere and Bernard Avishai, report by Bill Whitaker; "Quantum Computing" interview of researchers, Michio Kaku, professor at City College of New York, Charina Chou, CEO at Google Quantum AI, and Darío Gil, director of IBM Research, report by Scott Pelley; Interview with Greta Gerwig on Barbie with additional input from Noah Baumbach by Sharyn Alfonsi
13	"The Resistance; Red and Green; Novak Djokovic"	December 10, 2023	9.352
"The Resistance" interviews with people from Russian occupation of Kherson Oblast, Ukraine, report by Scott Pelley; "Red and Green" Gov. Mark Gordon of Wyoming making the state carbon-negative in CO2 emissions, report by Bill Whitaker; Interview with Novak Djokovic by Jon Wertheim
14	"The Hostage Story; Looting of Cambodia; Gnawa"	December 17, 2023	6.359
"The Hostage Story" Kidnapping of Yarden Roman-Gat, report by Lesley Stahl; "Looting of Cambodia" on Cambodian art, visit to Angkor Wat, discussion with Brad Gordan, American lawyer, on efforts by his team to investigate trading by British collector Douglas Latchford, report by Anderson Cooper; "Gnawa" traditional music of Morocco with Hamid El Kasri, musician, and Robert Wisdom at annual Gnawa World Music Festival, report by Bill Whitaker
15	"Commercial Real Estate; Master of the Mind"	January 14, 2024	4.973
"Commercial Real Estate" New York City commercial real estate in transition with interviews with representatives from RXR Realty and SL Green and Stijn Van Nieuwerburgh, Columbia University researcher, report by Jon Wertheim; "Master of the Mind" interview with Ali Rezai neurosurgeon on targeted brain treatments for Alzheimers and addiction that address Amyloid plaques in the brain, report by Sharyn Alfonsi
16	"Agency in Crisis/Interpol/Modern Ark"	January 28, 2024	6.546
"Agency in Crisis" - review of U. S. federal prison system with Colette S. Peters, director of the Federal Bureau of Prisons, a tour of Federal Correctional Institution, Aliceville, interviews of a union representative from National Council of Prisons Locals and whistleblower of abuses at Federal Correctional Institution, Dublin, report by Cecilia Vega; "Interpol" - coverage of the organization with interview of Jürgen Stock, Secretary General of Interpol, description of "Operation Global Chain " with forensic expert from French National Police working the case that resulted of arrest of Rocco Morabito and others, plus abuses of Red Notices related to the agency's pursuit of Bill Browder, report by Bill Whitaker; "Modern Ark" recovery of animals from Dr. Juan A. Rivero Zoo in Puerto Rico by Pat Craig, The Wild Animal Sanctuary in Colorado and other sanctuaries in the continental U. S., report by Jon Wertheim
17	"Chairman Powell; A Hole In The System; The Mismatch"	February 4, 2024	6.606
"Chairman Powell" Interview with U. S. Federal Reserve chair Jerome Powell by Scott Pelley; "A Hole In The System" Chinese migrants "walk the route" to illegally enter the U.S. through the southern border, report by Sharlyn Alfonsi; "The Mismatch" rise of online gambling with more youth sports betting, report by Jon Wertheim
18	"Crisis in the Red Sea; Fake Electors; Finding Cillian Murphy"	February 18, 2024	7.160
"Crisis in the Red Sea" - Red Sea crisis with response to threats via Operation Prosperity Guardian from an international collision including U. S. Navy, interview of Vice Admiral Brad Cooper on USS Dwight D. Eisenhower, Commander Justin Smith of USS Mason and Rear Adm. Marc Miguez, strike group commander, report by Norah O'Donnoll; "Fake Electors" - 2020 United States presidential election in Wisconsin#Aftermath and interview with Andrew Hitt, former chairman of the state Republican Party, report by Anderson Cooper; "Finding Cillian Murphy" interview with actor Cillian Murphy on his portrayal of J. Robert Oppenheimer in the film Oppenheimer by Scott Pelley
19	"142 Days in Gaza; China"	February 25, 2024	6.762
"142 Days in Gaza" - update on Gaza war with coverage at Nasser Hospital and the recent siege, report by Sharyn Alfonsi; "China" - interview with U.S. Ambassador to China Nicohlas Burns on China–United States relations. Additional report on the Chinese economy after the Zero-COVID policy with Joerg Wuttke from BASF China, report by Lesley Stahl. After broadcast, the China Daily editorial board expressed concerns about how Burns described China's goals.
20	"Operation Lone Star; 97 Books; Artemis "	March 3, 2024	7.334
"Operation Lone Star" - update from Texas on Operation Lone Star to secure Mexico–United States border with interviews of Governor of Texas Greg Abbott and Raul Ortiz, former chief of United States Border Patrol, report by Cecilia Vega; "97 Books" Beaufort County, South Carolina censorship of books from public libraries, report by Scott Pelley; "Artemis" NASA's Artemis program mission to the moon with launch vehicles Falcon Heavy from SpaceX and New Glenn from Blue Origin with interviews of George Scott, acting inspector general at NASA Office of Inspector General, Jim Free, associate administrator at NASA, and John Couluris, vice president at Blue Origin, report by Bill Whitaker; Last Minutes - update on story from March 2018 on damaged scrolls of Herculaneum, winner of Vesuvius Challenge
21	"The Capital of Free Russia; Healing Justice"	March 17, 2024	7.161
"The Capital of Free Russia" Vilnius, Lithuania welcomes Russian dissidents with interview of Mantas Adomėnas, former deputy minister of foreign affairs for Lithuania, Anastasia Shevchenko, Russian activist, Sergei Davidis, Russian activist, and two Russian journalists, Tatyana Felgenhauer and Aleksandr Plyuschev, report by Scott Pelley; "Healing Justice" - social justice organization to assist victims and the wrongfully accused with interviews of Jennifer Thompson, founder of Healing Justice and Ronald Cotton, victim of eyewitness misidentification, report by Lesley Stahl
22	"The Right to Be Wrong; AMLO; Law of the Sea "	March 24, 2024	7.120
"The Right to Be Wrong" countering misinformation on social media and free speech cases being heard by the U.S. Supreme Court with interviews of Representative Jim Jordan, congressperson for Ohio's 4th congressional district, Kate Starbird, professor at University of Washington and researcher of disaster informatics, Katie Harbath, former director of Facebook's public policy area for global elections, and Darren West Darrell M. West, fellow at the Brookings Institution, report by Lesley Stahl; "AMLO" Interview with Mexican President Andrés Manuel López Obrador at National Palace by Sharyn Alfoni; "Law of the Sea" United States Senate stalemate over ratifying United Nations Convention on the Law of the Sea with interview of John Bellinger, lawyer and former legal adviser to George W. Bush, John Negroponte, American diplomat, and Steven Groves, policy analyst The Heritage Foundation, report by Bill Whitaker
23	"Targeting Americans; Indian Relay"	March 31, 2024	10.365
"Targeting Americans" - results from a five-year investigation of Havana syndrome by 60 Minutes, The Insider, and Der Spiegel into unexplained brain injuries reported by U.S. national security officials with interviews of an FBI agent, David Relman, professor at Stanford University School of Medicine, Christo Grozev, journalist part of the investigation for The Insider, Mark Zaid, lawyer, and Greg Edgreen, retired Lt. Cornel in the U.S. Army and former investigator for Defense Intelligence Agency, report by Scott Pelley. After broadcast statements were made by White House, FBI, and Office of the Director of National Intelligence in response to the report. (Double length segment); "Indian Relay" - bareback horse racing by Indigenous peoples of the Great Plains with interviews of Ken Real Bird, race announcer and Calvin Ghost Bear, president of the Horse Nations Indian Relay Council, and several racers, report by Bill Whitaker
24	"Dr. Kuznetzov; Your Chatbot Will See You Now; The Ring"	April 7, 2024	6.653
"Dr. Kuznetzov" - clearing landmines in Izium, Ukraine, interview of Yuriy Kuznetzov, doctor in the Ukraine, local victims, demining professionals and a representative from HALO Trust, report by Scott Pelley; "Your Chatbot Will See You Now" - artificial intelligence tools offering mental health support with interviews of Alison Darcy, research psychologist and technologist, Lance Elliot, computer scientist, Ellen Fitzsimmons-Craft, researcher, Sharon Maxwell, early adopter of technology, and Monika Ostroff, social worker, report by Jon LaPook; "The Ring" - Thomas Trotta, criminal responsible for stolen items from sports venues and museums like Yogi Berra rings from Yogi Berra Museum, items at the USGA Museum with interview of Lindsay Berra, Berra's granddaughter and journalist, report by Jon Wertheim
25	"Scattered Spider; Knife; Tasmanian Tiger"	April 14, 2024	8.588
"Scattered Spider" - Ransomware attack against Las Vegas hotels and casinos by hacking group called Scattered Spider with interviews of Anthony Curtis, author, Bryan Vorndran, head of FBI Cyber Division, two researchers, Allison Nixon and Jon DiMaggio, and Rob Joyce, former director at National Security Agency, report by Bill Whitaker; "Knife" - interview with Salman Rushdie, author of Knife: Meditations After an Attempted Murder about being attacked in 2022 with Rachel Eliza Griffiths, Rushdie's wife and author, by Anderson Cooper; "Tasmanian Tiger" - Search for the Tasmanian tiger, an apex predator declared extinct with interviews of Adrian Richardson and Chris Rehberg, both amateur wildlife investigators, Nick Mooney, conservationist, Andrew Pask, epigeneticist, and Kristofer Michael Helgen, director at Australian Museum Research Institute, report by Jon Wertheim
26	"Secretary of Commerce; On British Soil; Kevin Hart"	April 21, 2024	7.047
"Secretary of Commerce" interview with U.S. Secretary of Commerce Gina Raimondo by Lesley Stahl on China–United States trade war with additional comments from Wendell Weeks, Corning Inc. CEO; "On British Soil" - history of Alderney camps on the Channel Islands with interviews of Marcus Roberts, local historian, Gilly Carr, archaeologist at Cambridge University, Gary Font, son of a camp survivor, and Eric Pickles, UK Special Envoy for Post-Holocaust Issues, report by Holly Williams; Interview with Kevin Hart by Anderson Cooper
27	"Children of War; Nvidia; Crisis at Pearl Harbor"	April 28, 2024	6.809
"Children of War" - Helping children of American veterans with Post-traumatic stress disorder with support from Elizabeth Dole and her foundation, report by Scott Pelley; "Nvidia" interview with Jensen Huang, CEO of Nvidia with interviews of users of GPU technology Demirdag from Cuebric, Snyder from Generate:Biomedicines and Adcock from Figure AI, report Bill Whitaker by; "Crisis at Pearl Harbor" - Red Hill water crisis causing lasting impacts after fuel spill at Red Hill Underground Fuel Storage Facility on water resources on Pearl Harbor, Hawaii with interviews of John F.G. Wade, United States Navy vice admiral and commander of Joint Task Force - Red Hill, Meredith Berger, Assistant Secretary of the Navy (Energy, Installations and Environment), and two local families impacted by spill, report by Sharyn Alfonsi
28	"Leader Jeffries; Work to Own; St. Mary's"	May 5, 2024	6.509
"Leader Jeffries" - Interview with House of Representatives House minority leader Hakeem Jeffries by Nora O'Donnell; "Work to Own" private equities firms like KKR promote employee ownership with interviews of Pete Stavros, executive at KKR, and employee owners at C.H.I. Overhead Doors and Potter Global Technologies, report by Jon Wertheim; " St. Mary's" - high school seniors, Calcea Johnson and Ne’Kiya Jackson, from St. Mary's Academy who solved a mathematical puzzle of Pythagorean theorem using only trigonometry with interviews of Michelle Blouin Williams, their math teacher, Pamela Rogers, president of academy, and Gloria Ladson-Billings, professor emeritus at the University of Wisconsin, report by Bill Whitaker
29	"A Week in Israel; A Web of Intrigue"	May 12, 2024	6.216
"A Week in Israel" - three fronts of the Gaza war: Gaza in the south, Hezbollah in the north, and Iran in the east, with interviews of Tamir Hayman, director of the Institute for National Security Studies and Omer Tischler, second in command of the Israeli air force, report by Lesley Stahl with studio introduction by Cecilia Vega; "A Web of Intrigue" - Free Joseon, anti-North Korean activist group, supporting North Korean defectors with interview of Christopher Ahn describing his role and associated legal challenges with United States Department of Justice including an interview of Naeun Rim, Ahn's attorney, report by Sharlyn Alfonsi
30	"Pope Francis; Cuban Spycraft; The Album"	May 19, 2024	7.333
Interview with Pope Francis by Norah O'Donnell; "Cuban Spycraft" - Cuban spy Manuel Rocha arrested in December 2023 after working within the U.S. government with security clearance with interviews of Brian Latell, analysis in CIA, Jose Cohen, former Cuban intelligence officer, and Peter Lapp, retired FBI agent and author of a biography on Ana Montes, report by Cecilia Vega; "The Album" - Höcker Album, photo album found at US Holocaust Memorial Museum depicting Nazis in social settings with interviews of Moises Kaufman and Amanda Gronich, collaborators on 2018 play Here There Are Blueberries, Rebecca Erbelding, historian at the USHMM museum, Irene Weiss, survivor at Auschwitz, and Tilman Taube, relative of an SS officer, report by Anderson Cooper

During the post-season, the July 14, 2024 episode contained original reporting on the July 2024 Trump assassination attempt.
