= Institute for National Security Studies =

Institute for National Security Studies may refer to:

- Institute for National Security Studies (United States), an institute of the United States Air Force
- Institute for National Security Studies (Israel), an external institute of Tel Aviv University,
