= 60 Minutes season 55 =

Season of television series

60 Minutes
- Season 55
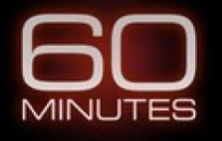
- Logo of 60 Minutes, a CBS news magazine television show broadcast continuously since 1968]
- No. of episodes: 31

Release
- Original network: CBS
- Original release: September 18, 2022 – May 21, 2023

Season chronology
- Next → Season 56

60 Minutes's 56th season aired from September 1, 2022, to May 21, 2023. The show is hosted by several correspondents; none share screen time with each other. Full-time hosts include Lesley Stahl, Scott Pelley and Bill Whitaker. Reporters include Sharyn Alfonsi, Anderson Cooper and Jon Wertheim. On May 7, 2023, correspondent Cecilia Vega debuted on the show in the middle of the season. Her first story was on sperm whales near the Caribbean island of Dominica. Norah O'Donnell contributed reporting on episode 13.

The 16th episode with the interview of Prince Harry had the highest ratings of the season.

== Awards ==
The segment “Healing and Hope” from April 23, 2023 won a Writers Guild of America East award in the category "News Script - Analysis, Feature or Commentary" for Scott Pelley, Nicole Young, and Kristin Steve of CBS News.

== Episodes ==
No. in season	Title	Topic(s)	Original release date	Viewers (millions)
1	"President Biden, Ebrahim Raisi"	U.S. politics;Iran	September 18, 2022	10.197
Interview of United States President Biden by Scott Pelley; Interview of Iran President Raisi by Lesley Stahl
2	"The Secretary of State, Inside the Committee, Rescuing Reefs"	international affairs; U.S. politics; ecology	September 25, 2022	7.144
"The Secretary of State" - interview of Secretary of State Antony Blinken by Scott Pelley; "Inside the Committee" interview of former U. S. Representative of Virginia, Denver Riggleman, on United States House Select Committee on the January 6 Attack, report by Bill Whitaker; "Rescuing Reefs" - coral nurseries to rescue coral reefs with Andrew Baker and Diego Luhrmann, marine biologists from University of Miami, report by Anderson Cooper
3	"Olena Zelenska, What Happened at Grizzly Flats, Captain Kolisi"	Ukraine; ecology; sport	October 2, 2022	10.274
Interview with Olena Zelenska the First Lady of Ukraine by Scott Pelley; "What Happened at Grizzly Flats" - wildfire at Grizzly Flats, California, report by Bill Whitaker; "Captain Kolisi" - Siya Kolisi from South Africa national rugby union team, report by Jon Wertheim
4	"Taiwan, After Ian, Church and State"	Taiwan;earth science;religion	October 9, 2022	7.624
"Taiwan" Life in Taiwan after 2022 Chinese military exercises around Taiwan and preparations by citizens and the Republic of China Armed Forces, report by Lesley Stahl; "After Ian" effects of Hurricane Ian, report by Bill Whitaker; "Church and State" Southern Baptist Convention President Bart Barber interviewed by Anderson Cooper
5	"Bucha, Ukraine, Offshore wind farms; Deion Sanders"	Ukraine;energy;sport	October 16, 2022	10.719
"Bucha, Ukraine" - Stories of Bucha, Ukraine by Scott Pelley; "Offshore wind farms" - the largest offshore wind farm in the world at Hornsea Wind Farm in Britain by Sharyn Alfonsi; Interview with Deion Sanders, the football coach at Jackson State
6	"Dominion, American Prairie, Ina Garten"	U.S. elections;ecology;food	October 23, 2022	7.966
"Dominion" - Dominion Voting Systems involved in the false claims of fraud in 2020 U.S. presidential election; "American Prairie" - American Prairie's nature reserve by Bill Whitaker; Interview with Ina Garten known as the "Barefoot Contessa" on cooking and Garten's fame by Sharyn Alfonsi
7	"Belief in the Ballot, Pathogen X, David Sedaris"	U.S. elections;healthcare;entertainment	October 30, 2022	8.041
"Belief in the Ballot" - Attempts to overturn the 2020 United States presidential election interviews with Rusty Bowers and Mark Finchem by Scott Pelley; "Pathogen X" - virus hunters from University of California Davis and partners in Uganda visit Bwindi Impenetrable Forest by Bill Whitaker; Interview with David Sedaris on his life as a writer and humorist, including comments by Amy Sedaris by Jon Wertheim
8	"Angry in America, Buses from the Border, Ready or Not"	TBA	November 6, 2022	10.676
"Angry in America" use of social media platforms for political discourse with Tristan Harris cofounder of the Center for Humane Technology, report by Bill Whitaker; "Buses from the Border" New York City migrant housing crisis by Anderson Cooper; "Ready or Not" interviews with contemporary survivalist in the United States by Jon Wertheim
9	"The Surfside Mystery, The Paper Brigade, Sona and the Kora"	TBA	November 13, 2022	6.769
"The Surfside Mystery" - investigations into the causes of the Surfside condominium collapse by Sharyn Alfonsi; "The Paper Brigade" - Yiddish scientific institute YIVO with Hadas Kalderon granddaughter of Avrom Sutzkever, poet from Vilnius by Jon Wertheim; "Sona and the Kora" - Sona Jobarteh playing the Kora, report by Lesley Stahl
10	"The Most Dangerous Place in the World, The Panini Sticker Phenomenon, Wild Horses"	TBA	November 20, 2022	9.95
"The Most Dangerous Place in the World" - Zaporizhzhia power plant monitored by the International Atomic Energy Agency with interview of Rafael Mariano Grossi, director of IAEA, and Andriy Tuz, plant spokesperson, report by Lesley Stahl, produced by Shachar Bar-On.; "The Panini Sticker Phenomenon" - collecting and trading Panini Stickers for the FIFA World Cup with interviews of Francesco Furnari, U.S. distributor, family of Giuseppe Panini, and Antonio Allegra, marketing director, report by Jon Wertheim, produced by Draggan Mihailovich; "Wild Horses" - wild Horses in area of Wyoming and the badlands and work by Bureau of Land Management (BLM) with interviews of Jess Oldham, sanctuary operator, Holle Waddell, division chief at BLM, and Curtis Moffat, warden in Wyoming Department of Correction, report by Sharyn Alfonsi, produced by Michael Karzis and Katie Kerbstat; "Update" Bill Whitaker provided an update on NASA's plans for the mission to the Moon called Artemis
11	"Grave Injustice; Survival of the Friendliest; Comparative Oncology"	TBA	November 27, 2022	9.026
"Grave Injustice" cemeteries uncovered in Clearwater County, Florida with graves of Afro Americans, report by Scott Pelley, produced by Nicole Young and Kristin Steve.; "Survival of the Friendliest" dog genetics with interviews of Brian Hare, researcher, Peggy Callahan, director Wildlife Science Center, Meg Callahan, staff at science center, Bridgett M. vonHoldt, researcher, and Ben Monkaba, patient with Williams Syndrome, report by Anderson Cooper, produced by Denise Schrier Cetta; "Comparative oncology" - University of Pennsylvania professor and veterinarian Nicola Mason with funding from White House Cancer Moonshot looking at cancers in dogs and humans like osteosarcoma, report by Anderson Cooper, produced by Denise Schrier Cetta
12	"French President; Mozambique Gorongosa National Park; Shane Van Boening"	TBA	December 4, 2022	10.464
Interview with Emmanuel Macron, French President discussing Russian invasion of Ukraine and recent state visit, report by Bill Whitaker, produced by Marc Lieberman and Cassidy McDonald; "Mozambique Gorongosa National Park" - Rebuilding Mozambique Gorongosa National Park with interview of Gregory C. Carr, report by Scott Pelley, produced by Henry Schuster and Sarah Turcotte; Interview with Shane Van Boening, professional pool player by Jon Wertheim, produced by Nathalie Sommer
13	"The Treasury Secretary, Suing Social Media, College of Magic"	TBA	December 11, 2022	7.825
"The Treasury Secretary" - interview of Janet Yellen, United States Secretary of the Treasury by Norah O'Donnell, produced by Keith Sharman.; "Suing Social Media" Section 230#Debate on protections for social media (2016 - present), report by Sharyn Alfonsi, produced by Ashley Velie; "College of Magic" - school known as College of Magic for training students in the skills of stage magic in Capetown, South Africa, report by Jon Wertheim, produced by Michael H. Gavshon and Nadim Roberts
14	"Convoy of Life, Litigation Funding, Lourdes"	TBA	December 18, 2022	9.594
"Convoy of Life" life saving measures for a cancer patient from Okhmatdyt children's hospital in Kiev by a worldwide coalition led by St. Jude Children's Research Hospital of Memphis, Tennessee; "Litigation Funding" - the field of legal financing with interviews of Craig Underwood, farmer from Ventura County, California and Christopher Bogart, CEO of Burford Capital; "Lourdes" - the town of Lourdes in Occitanie region in southwestern France
15	"Radio Free Europe, The Vanishing Wild, Obesity"	TBA	January 1, 2023	9.258
"Radio Free Europe" - Radio Free Europe/Radio Liberty; "The Vanishing Wild" - Holocene extinction ongoing extinction event caused by humans damaging the environment; "Obesity" Obesity related to genetics
16	"Prince Harry, Hans Zimmer"	TBA	January 8, 2023	11.215
Prince Harry, Duke of Sussex interviewed by Anderson Cooper about his new memoir Spare; Interview with Hans Zimmer by Lesley Stahl about his movie soundtracks
17	"Star Power; Hide and Seek; The Guru"	TBA	January 15, 2023	6.33
"Star Power" - hydrogen to fusion at US Department of Energy Lawrence Livermore National Laboratory; "Hide and Seek" - Cyprus as a financial hub for Russian investment; "The Guru" - interview with Rick Rubin, music producer
18	"The IMF Report ; Investigating Donald Trump ; Red Hot Chili Peppers "	TBA	February 5, 2023	6.914
"The IMF Report" - Kristalina Georgieva Managing Director IMF on the global economy in 2023; "Investigating Donald Trump" - Mark Pomerantz and New York investigations of The Trump Organization; Interview with members of the band Red Hot Chili Peppers
19	"Candles Against the Darkness; Prime Minister Marin; The Historymakers"	TBA	February 19, 2023	6.821
"Candles Against the Darkness" - effects of power outages in the Ukraine during Russian invasion of Ukraine; Interview with Finish Prime Minister Sanna Marin; "The Historymakers" interview of Julieanna Richardson and participants in the project The HistoryMakers documenting the Black experience in America
20	"Kherson Under Fire, The Girls of SOLA"	TBA	February 26, 2023	6.879
"Kherson Under Fire" Kherson impacts during Russian invasion of Ukraine; "The Girls of SOLA" - educating young women of Afghanistan in SOLA school in Rwanda
21	"Please Let Me Die; Who is Minding the Chatbots?; David Byrne "	TBA	March 5, 2023	6.932
"Please Let Me Die" - Treatment of prisoners of war in the Russian invasion of Ukraine; "Who is Minding the Chatbots?" OpenAI's ChatGPT with interviews of Ellie Pavlick from Brown University; Interview with David Byrne by Anderson Cooper
22	"The State of the Navy; "Only in America" "	TBA	March 19, 2023	8.261
"The State of the Navy" - United States Navy responds to increased strength of the People's Liberation Army Navy; "Only in America" - interview of Rocco Commisso on buying the Italian football club Fiorentina
23	"Feeling of Feeling; Silicon Valley Scandal; Charles Barkley "	TBA	March 26, 2023	9.291
"Feeling of Feeling" - Prosthetic technology for touch; "Silicon Valley Scandal" - eBay stalking scandal; Interview with Charles Barkley
24	"MTG; The Secretary and the Border; Fire and Ice "	TBA	April 2, 2023	6.985
Interview with Marjorie Taylor Greene; "The Secretary and the Border" - United States Secretary of Homeland Security Alejandro Mayorkas on securing Mexico–United States border; "Fire and Ice" - Lava fields after volcatic activity in Iceland
25	"The Origin of Everything; Sportswashing; The Resurrection Of Notre Dame "	TBA	April 9, 2023	7.571
"The Origin of Everything" - NASA's James Webb Space Telescope; "Sportswashing" investigation into Saudi Arabia investments into hosting international sporting events; "The Resurrection Of Notre Dame" - Reconstruction of Notre-Dame cathedral in Paris
26	"Revolution; The Unlikely Adventures of David Grann "	TBA	April 16, 2023	7.376
"Revolution" - projected impacts of Artificial Intelligence with interviews of Google CEO Sundar Pichai, look into DeepMind, Google's AI lab in London; "The Unlikely Adventures of David Grann" interview with David Grann on his book The Wager: A Tale of Shipwreck, Mutiny and Murder
27	"Healing and Hope; Who is Ray Epps; Nicolas Cage"	TBA	April 23, 2023	7.414
"Healing and Hope" - after earthquakes in northwest Syria two aid groups, White Helmets and Syrian American Medical Society provide relief, interviews with Samer Attar, doctor, Amany Jaqlan, nurse, Abdo Tarek and Sameh Fakhori, volunteer rescuers, a family impacted by earthquake, and Mufaddal Hamadeh, former president of SAMS, report by Scott Pelley, produced by Nicole Young. This segment won a Writer's Guide of America award.; "Who is Ray Epps" report on Ray Epps, former United States Marine and Oath Keepers chapter president, who was a rioter at the United States Capitol on January 6, 2021 with interviews of Robyn Epps, wife of Mr. Epps, Ray Epps, and Tom Joscelyn, researcher, by Bill Whitaker, produced by Graham Messick; Interview with Nicolas Cage
28	"The Domino Effect; Out Of Thin Air; An American Down Under"	TBA	April 30, 2023	7.111
"The Domino Effect" Early pregnancy loss and Every Mother Counts (EMC), a maternal advocacy group founded by Christy Turlington; "Out Of Thin Air" first Carbon dioxide removal plant for Direct air capture; "An American Down Under" interview with American Mason Cox, player of Australian rules football
29	"This Ancient Atrocity; Lithium Valley; James Nachtwey"	TBA	May 7, 2023	7.234
"This Ancient Atrocity" Packers Sanitation Services illegal employment of children; "Lithium Valley" lithium mining in southern California; Interview of James Nachtwey, war photographer
30	"The Church's Firm; The Sperm Whales Of Dominica; Yannick Nézet-Séguin"	TBA	May 14, 2023	6.695
"The Church's Firm" - David A. Nielsen, whistleblower to the IRS and former portfolio manager at Ensign Peak Advisors for Mormon church investments; "The Sperm Whales Of Dominica" sperm Whales in Dominica; Interview with Yannick Nézet-Séguin, orchestra conductor
31	"Price Gouging; Targeting Seniors; Jeff Koons"	TBA	May 21, 2023	7.04
"Price Gouging" - Pentagon investigation into increased weapons prices by U.S. defense contractors including the MIM-104 Patriot system; "Targeting Seniors" - Cybercrime targeting parents and grandparents; Interview with Jeff Koons, artist

== Production Staff ==
The executive producer was Bill Owens.
