= The Sloth Conservation Foundation =

Non-profit organization in Costa Rica

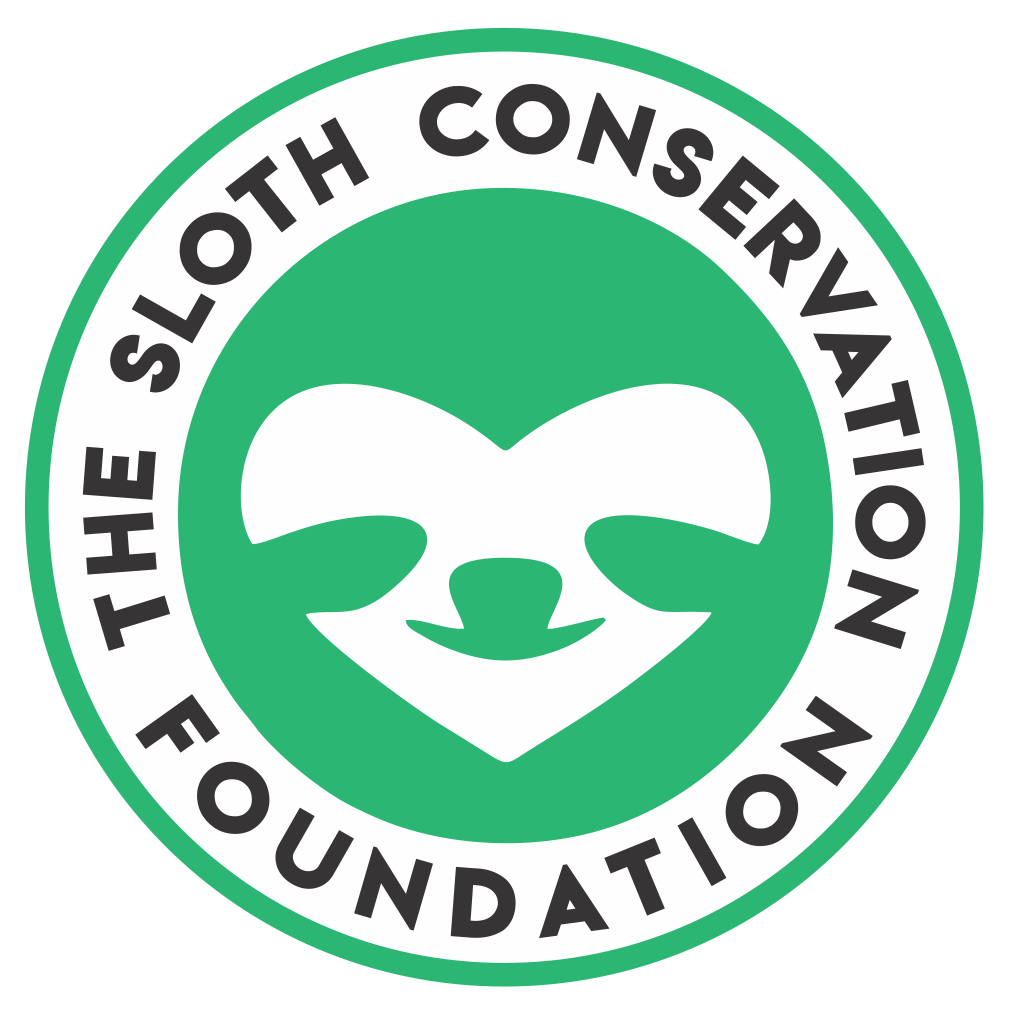
- Founded: 2017
- Founder: Dr. Rebecca Cliffe
- Type: Non-profit organization
- Purpose: Wildlife conservation
- Location: Costa Rica
- Region served: South Caribbean of Costa Rica
- Website: slothconservation.org

The Sloth Conservation Foundation (SloCo) is a non-profit organisation based in Costa Rica that is dedicated to the protection of sloths living in wild and human-modified habitats through research, education and community-based conservation. SloCo was founded in 2017 by sloth researcher Dr. Rebecca Cliffe.

SloCo is a local non-profit focused on a community-based approach that encourage people and sloths to coexist in a mutually beneficial way.

== History ==
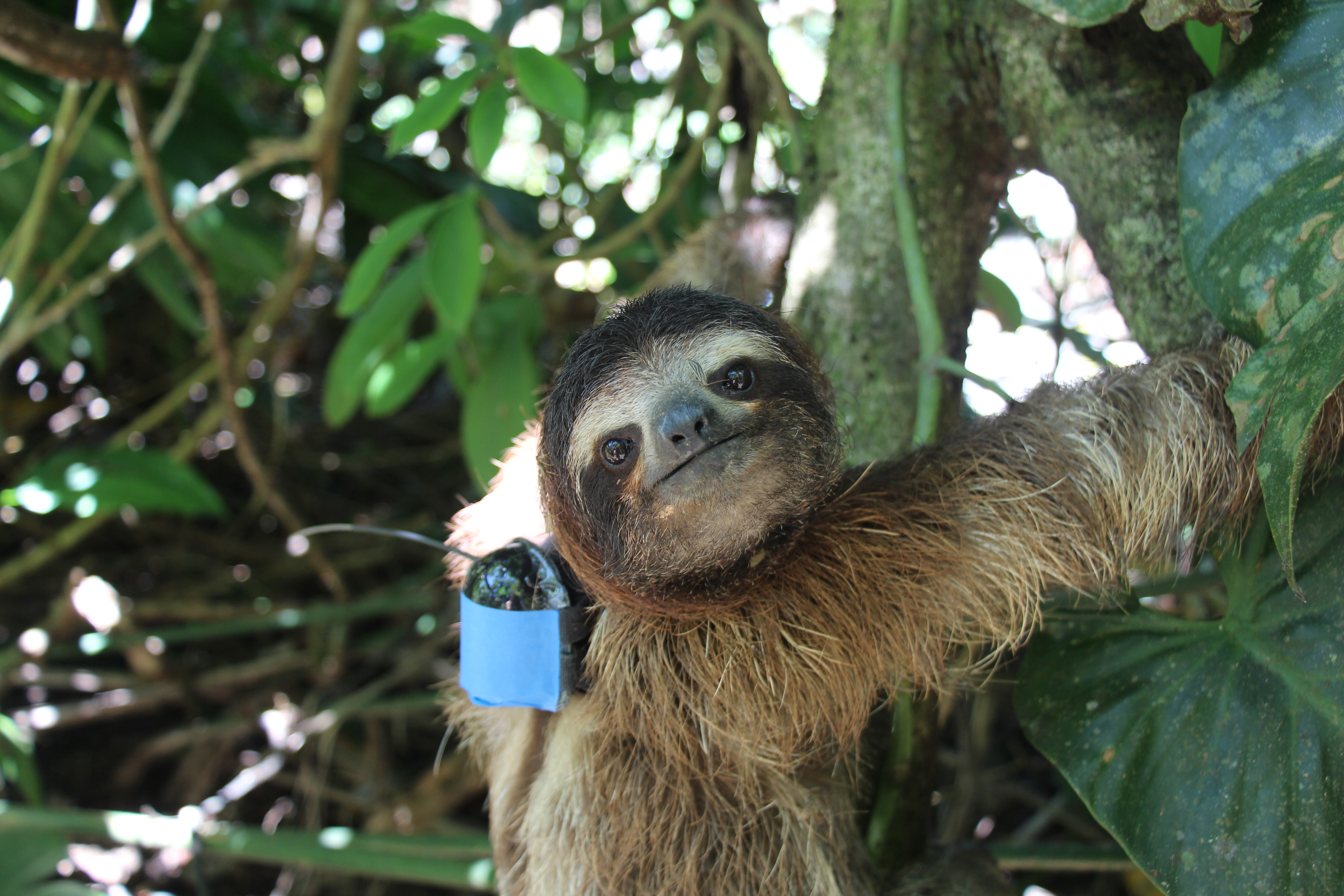
A three-fingered sloth (Bradypus variegatus) being monitored as part of Dr. Rebecca Cliffe's Sloth Backpack Project.

While researching sloths in Costa Rica, Panama, Colombia and Brazil over a period of 10 years, Dr. Cliffe witnessed firsthand the various threats faced by wild sloth populations. SloCo was born out of the need to protect wild sloth populations while furthering the scientific understanding of these poorly understood species.

== Activities ==
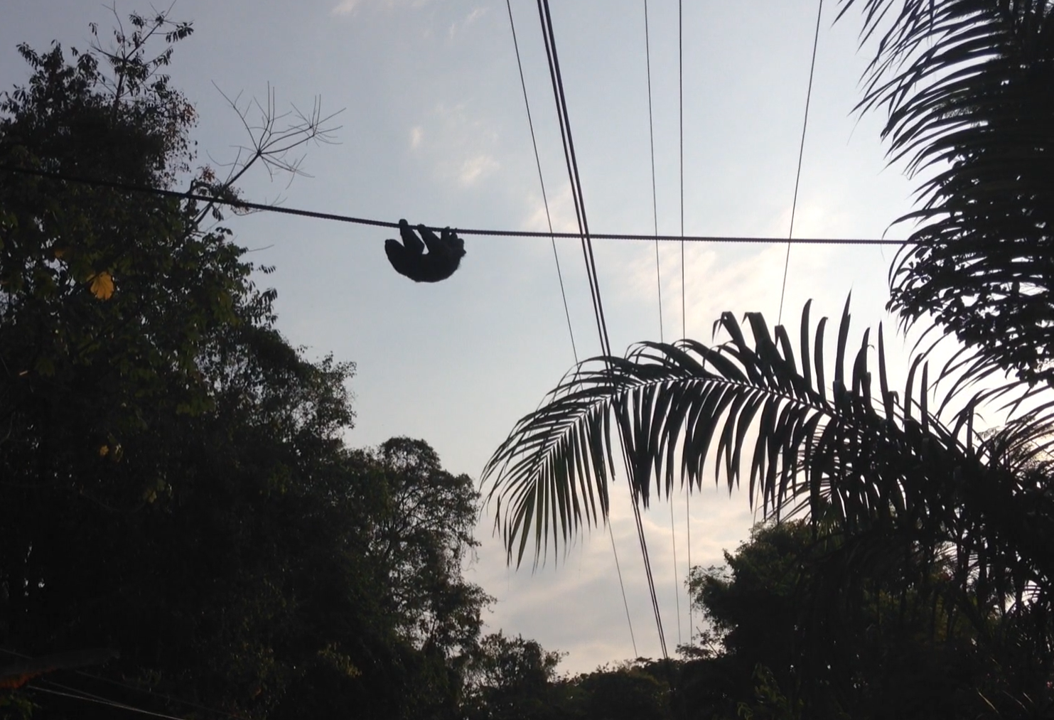
A three-fingered sloth (Bradypus variegatus) crossing a road using a rope bridge.

Loss of habitat due to rainforest urbanisation (including power line electrocutions, dog attacks and traffic collisions) agriculture, climate change, wildlife trade and irresponsible ecotourism (i.e. wildlife selfies) are some of the main threats that sloths face. Sloths are now considered to be a conservation concern in Costa Rica, and, according to a 2017 report published by the World Animal Protection, Costa Rica is one of the top ten worst countries for selfies with wild animals.

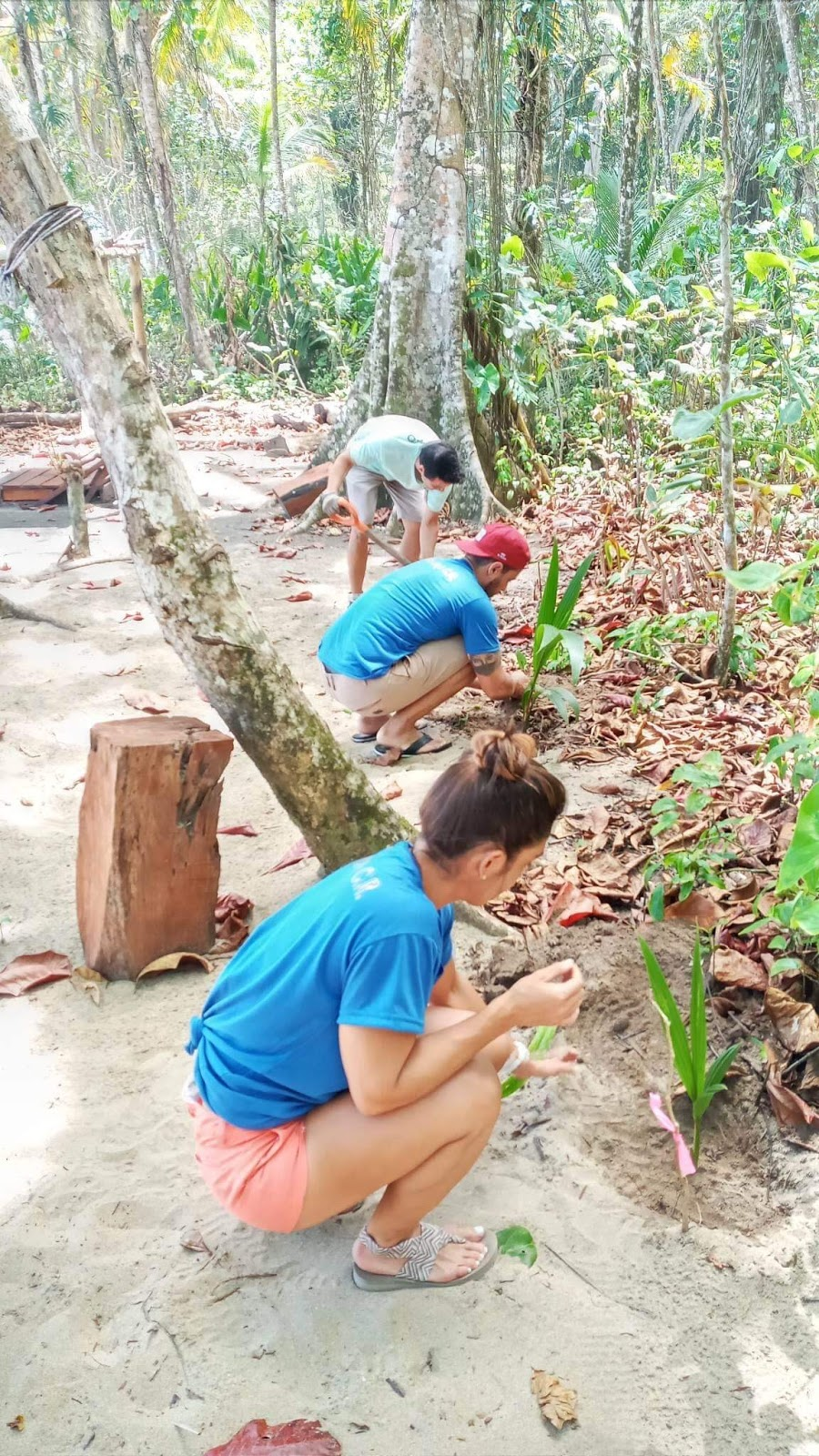
Reforestation campaign with sloth-friendly trees.

=== Combating habitat fragmentation ===
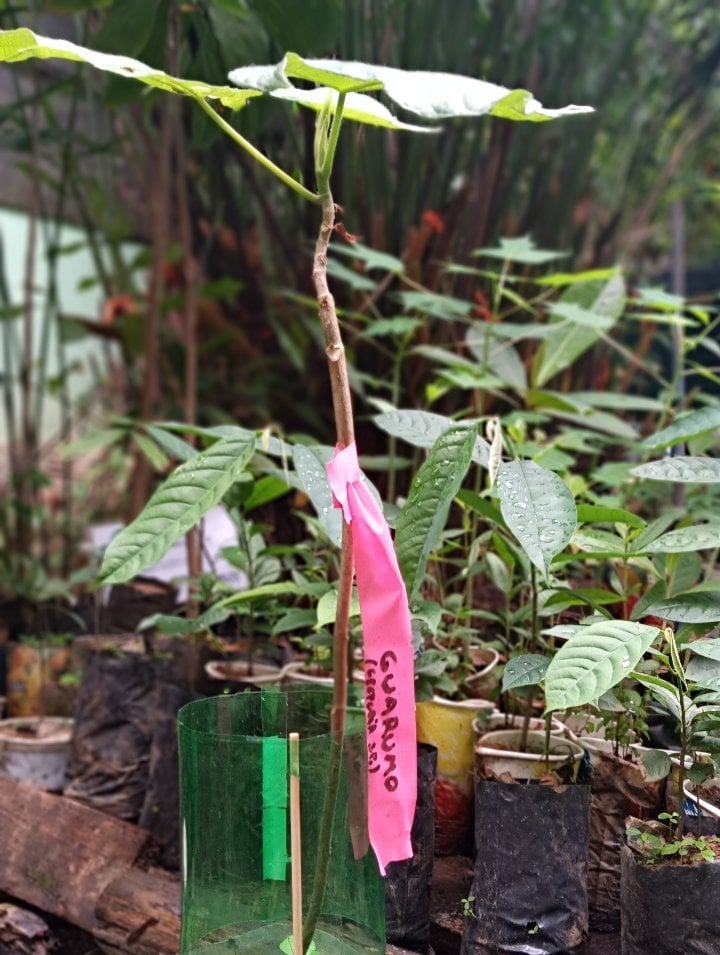
Nursery saplings with recycled plastic bottle protectors.

Due to their slow nature and highly specialized arboreal lifestyle, sloths are particularly sensitive to the effects of habitat fragmentation and degradation. Without a natural or artificial canopy bridge, the only way for a sloth to cross between trees in disturbed areas is by crawling on the ground. Crossing on the ground takes a lot of time and energy as their specialised muscle structure is adapted for hanging in trees, and, as a result, they often get hit by cars while crossing roads.

To combat the effects of development, SloCo restores and protects critical sloth habitat through reforestation with tree species favoured by sloths. As a part of their Connected Gardens Project, SloCo installs 'sloth crossing' canopy bridges to connect forest fragments in disturbed areas. These bridges give sloths and other wildlife a safe way to travel across roads and navigate urban areas without having to risk coming to the ground.

=== Preventing dog attacks and electrocutions ===
When sloths come to the ground they are at a higher risk for dog attacks, which are a leading cause of death for sloths in Costa Rica. With the aim of reducing the probability of dog attacks on sloths, SloCo funds the sterilization of stray dogs, as part of their Oh My Dog campaign, to reduce the overall number of dogs roaming freely in Costa Rica. SloCo also provides funding to insulate power lines to prevent the electrocution of sloths and other types of wildlife, which number in the thousands every year in Costa Rica.

=== Teaching responsible tourism ===
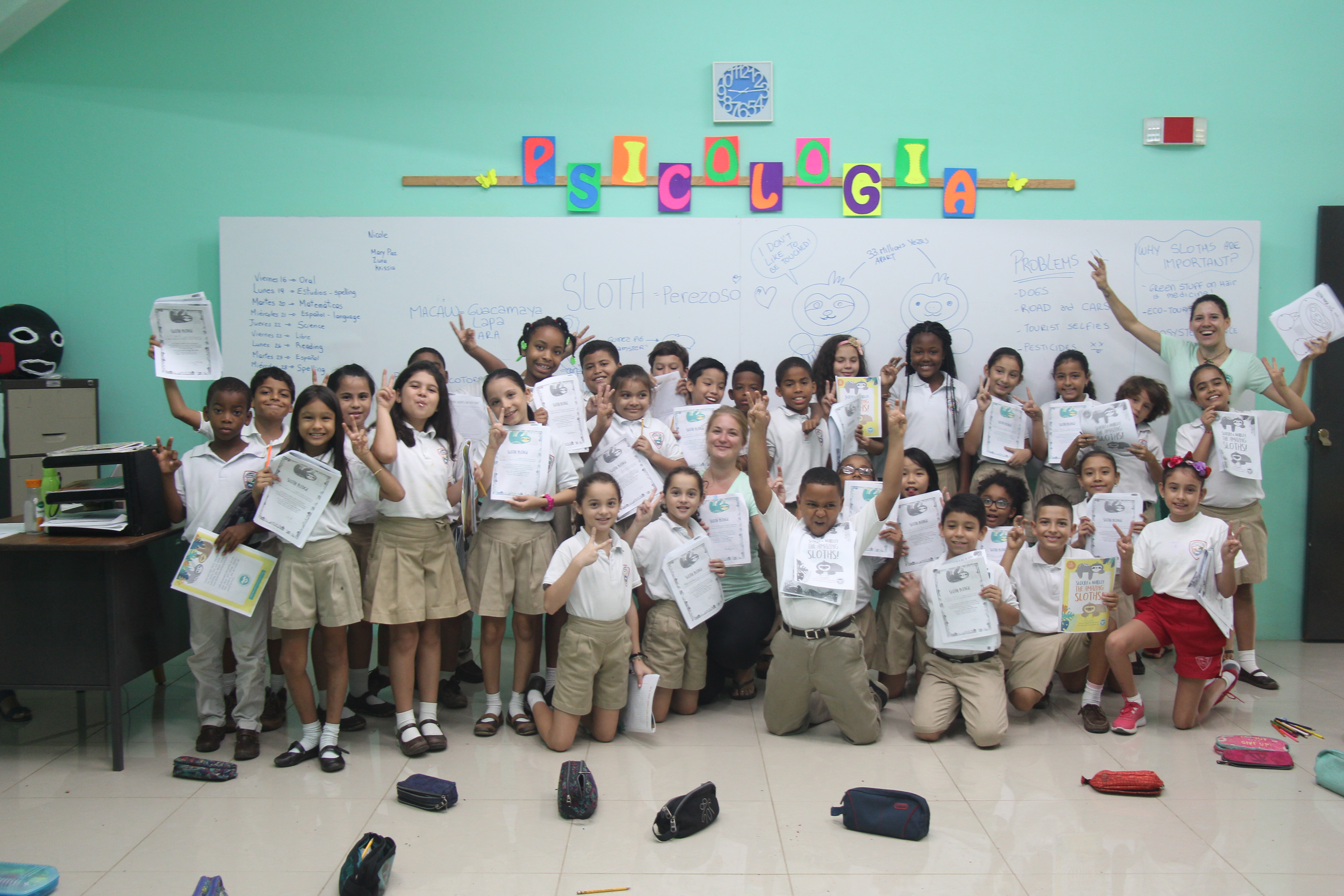
Lessons about sloths taught at local schools.

SloCo coordinates online and local education programs to encourage the protection rather than the exploitation of wildlife. Awareness is raised on the issue of wildlife trade through educational campaigns and speaking out against organizations that exploit wildlife. Due to pressure from SloCo and other concerned parties, two organizations known for their exploitation of sloths and other wildlife (Dade City's Wild Things and Alligator Attraction at John's Pass) have ceased these activities.

=== Conducting research ===
To further ongoing conservation projects, SloCo funds and coordinates high-quality scientific research on sloths published in open-access, peer-reviewed journals. The director of SloCo, Rebecca Cliffe has published various studies providing new insights into the biology, ecology, genetics and physiology of all six sloth species and continues to conduct research to improve the scientific understanding and conservation efforts of sloths in the wild.
