= Katie Harbath =

Business executive

- Born: November 12, 1980 (age 45); Wisconsin
- Education: University of Wisconsin
- Occupations: CEO and Founder at Anchor Change
- Known for: Political strategies and policies for social media

Katie Harbath is the founder and chief executive officer of the technology policy firm Anchor Change. She is known for her work advising politicians and governments on social media use at Facebook, where she previously held an executive position as the company's director of public policy for global elections. Harbath left Facebook in 2021.

== Early and personal life ==
Harbath was raised in a conservative family in Green Bay, Wisconsin, where her father was a paper mill executive. She describes herself as a "middle-of-the-road Republican", and is a fan of the television show The West Wing. Harbath studied journalism and political science at the University of Wisconsin.

== Career ==
After graduating college, Harbath worked for the Republican National Committee, where she oversaw digital campaign efforts and developed the website GOP.com in 2004. In 2008, she led digital strategy for Rudy Giuliani's presidential campaign, then directed the National Republican Senatorial Committee's digital strategy during the 2010 United States House of Representatives elections.

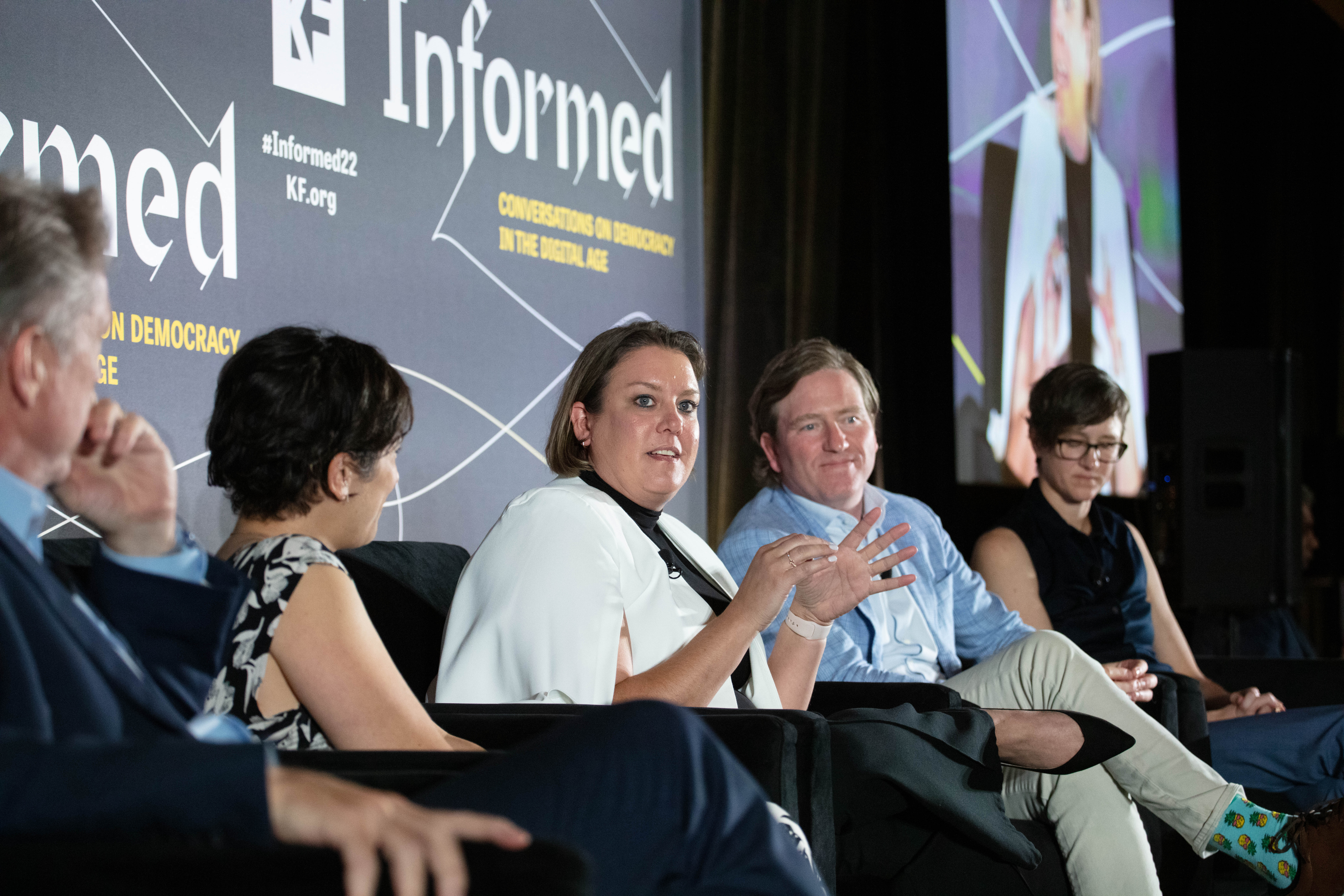
Harbath (center) at an event organized by the Knight Foundation, 2022.

Harbath joined Facebook in 2011 as one of a two-person team that advised politicians and their campaign staff on how to use the platform during elections. Harbath advised Republican candidates, while her counterpart advised Democrats. In her role, Harbath also traveled internationally, coaching governments and political campaigns on social media use. Harbath later became Facebook's public policy director for global elections and managed a staff of 60 employees that trained political parties how to use the platform, and helped design the company's election policy. Harbath said she initially thought social media would lead to greater transparency from governments, but began to doubt that premise in 2016 when she saw the amount of misinformation on social media surrounding Brexit, the 2016 United States presidential election, and the 2016 Philippine presidential election. She left the company in 2021.

After leaving Facebook, Harbath founded technology policy firm Anchor Change, and joined the Integrity Institute, an organization that advises American and European lawmakers on legislation around social media and advocates for stronger regulations of the industry. As of 2022, she was also a fellow at several think tanks focused on political issues, including the Bipartisan Policy Center. As of February 2024, she was the chief global affairs officer of Duco Experts, a technology firm. In 2026 she announced the upcoming release of a memoir titled Disrupting Politics.
