= Rebecca Cliffe =

British zoologist

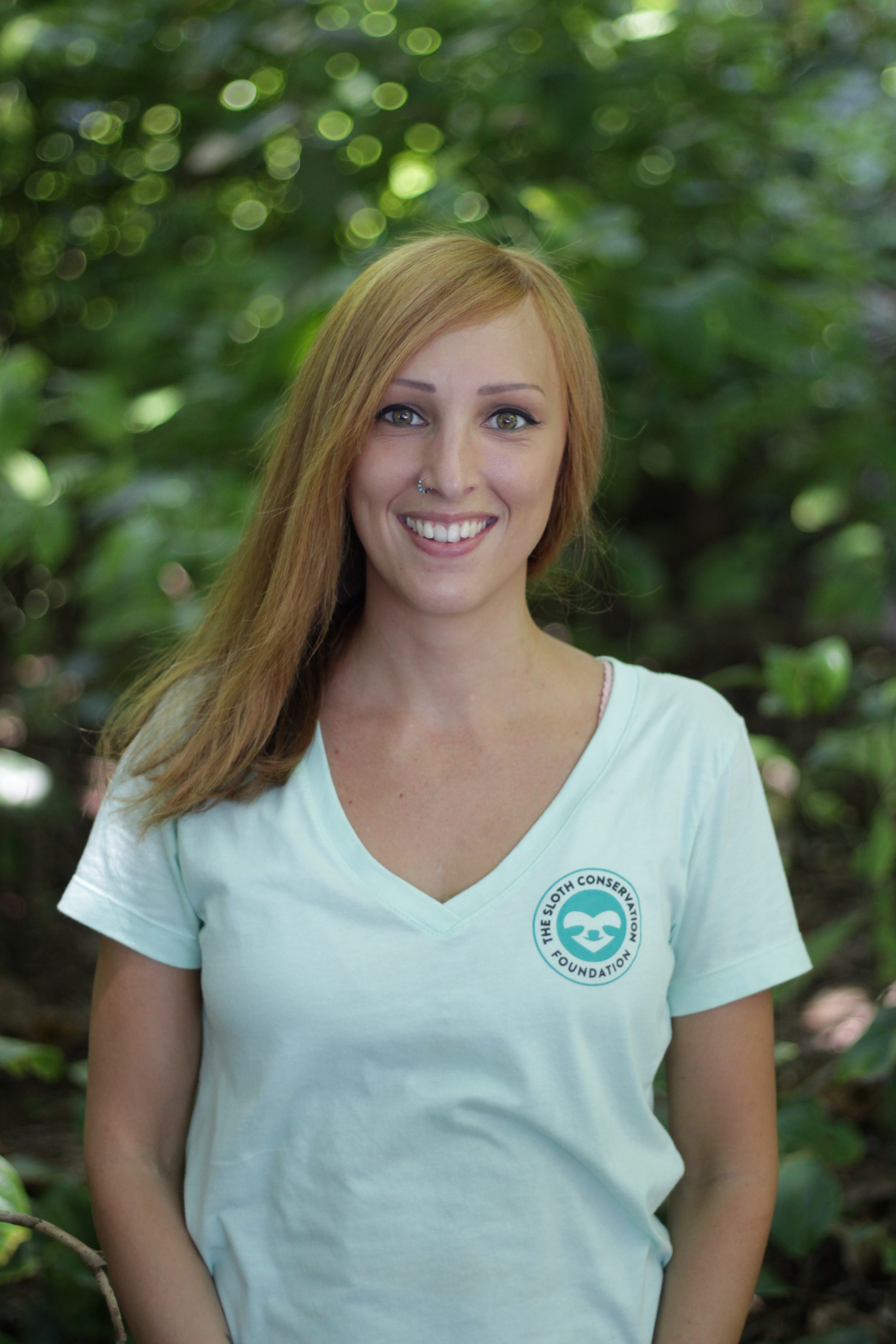
- Born: May 15, 1990 (age 36); Preston, England
- Education: University of Manchester (BA, 2012); Swansea University (PhD, 2017)
- Occupations: zoologist, conservation biologist
- Spouse: Alex Jones (m. 2023)
- Website: www.slothconservation.org

Rebecca Cliffe (born May 15, 1990) is a British zoologist, award-winning conservationist, and one of the leading experts on sloth biology and ecology. She is the Founder and executive director of The Sloth Conservation Foundation and author of the book Sloths: Life in the Slow Lane.

== Early years and work ==
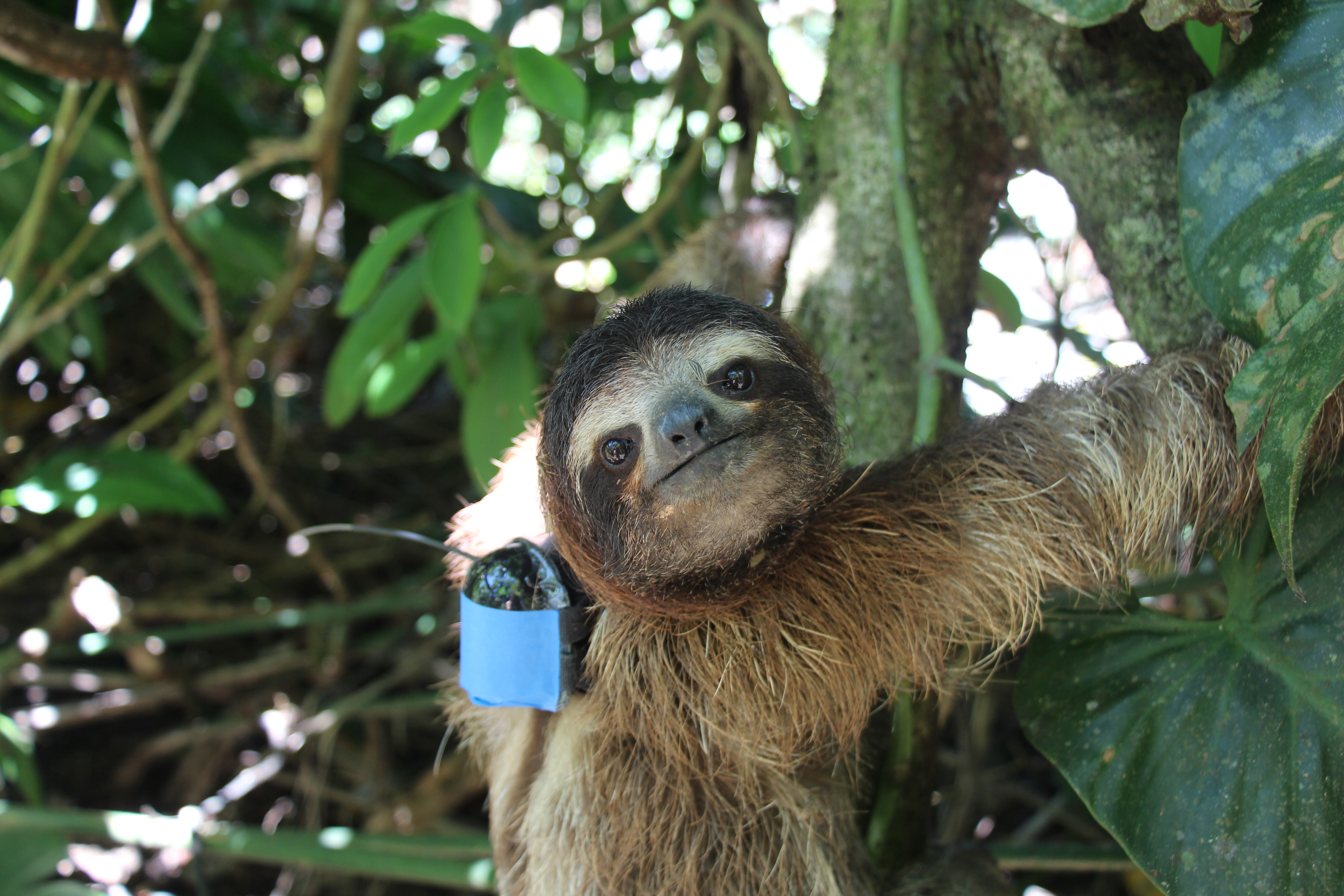
A three-fingered sloth (Bradypus variegatus) being monitored as part of Dr. Rebecca Cliffe's Sloth Backpack Project.

Cliffe was born in 1990 in Preston, England. Cliffe received her bachelor's degree in Zoology from the University of Manchester. She later went on to obtain a PhD in bioscience (specializing in sloths) from Swansea University. As part of her PhD research, she conducted the longest recorded study on wild sloth ecology (The Sloth Backpack Project).

She has published various studies on the ecology, biology, and physiology of sloths which have provided new insights about these poorly understood species. Due to her in-depth research and first-hand observations in the field she is considered to be an expert on sloths and their behavior.

She was featured in the Discovery Channel series "Meet the Sloths." She also was a part of the documentary "72 Dangerous Animals: Latin America" and featured in Animal Planet's "Too Cute! Baby Sloths."

== Recent work ==
In 2017, Cliffe founded The Sloth Conservation Foundation a registered non-profit organisation that is dedicated to saving sloths in the wild and has served as executive director since its inception. She continues to publish research on the biology, ecology and physiology of sloths. In 2022 she was selected as one of the winners of the prestigious Future For Nature award, and she used the prize money to train the first scat detection dog for sloth population monitoring.

In 2023, Cliffe's work with The Sloth Conservation Foundation was featured on NBC's Today show and 60 Minutes. Her story has also been turned into a children's storybook "The Adventures of Dr. Sloth" by award-winning wildlife photographer Suzi Eszterhas.

On July 25, 2024, Cliffe was awarded the honorary title of Doctor of Science by Swansea University, in recognition of her groundbreaking work in research and conservation.

== Personal life ==
In 2023, Cliffe married wildlife cameraman Alex (Lex) Jones whom she met while filming sloths for Disney's "A Real Bug's Life" series.
