= Ezzedine Choukri Fishere =

Egyptian novelist, diplomat and academic

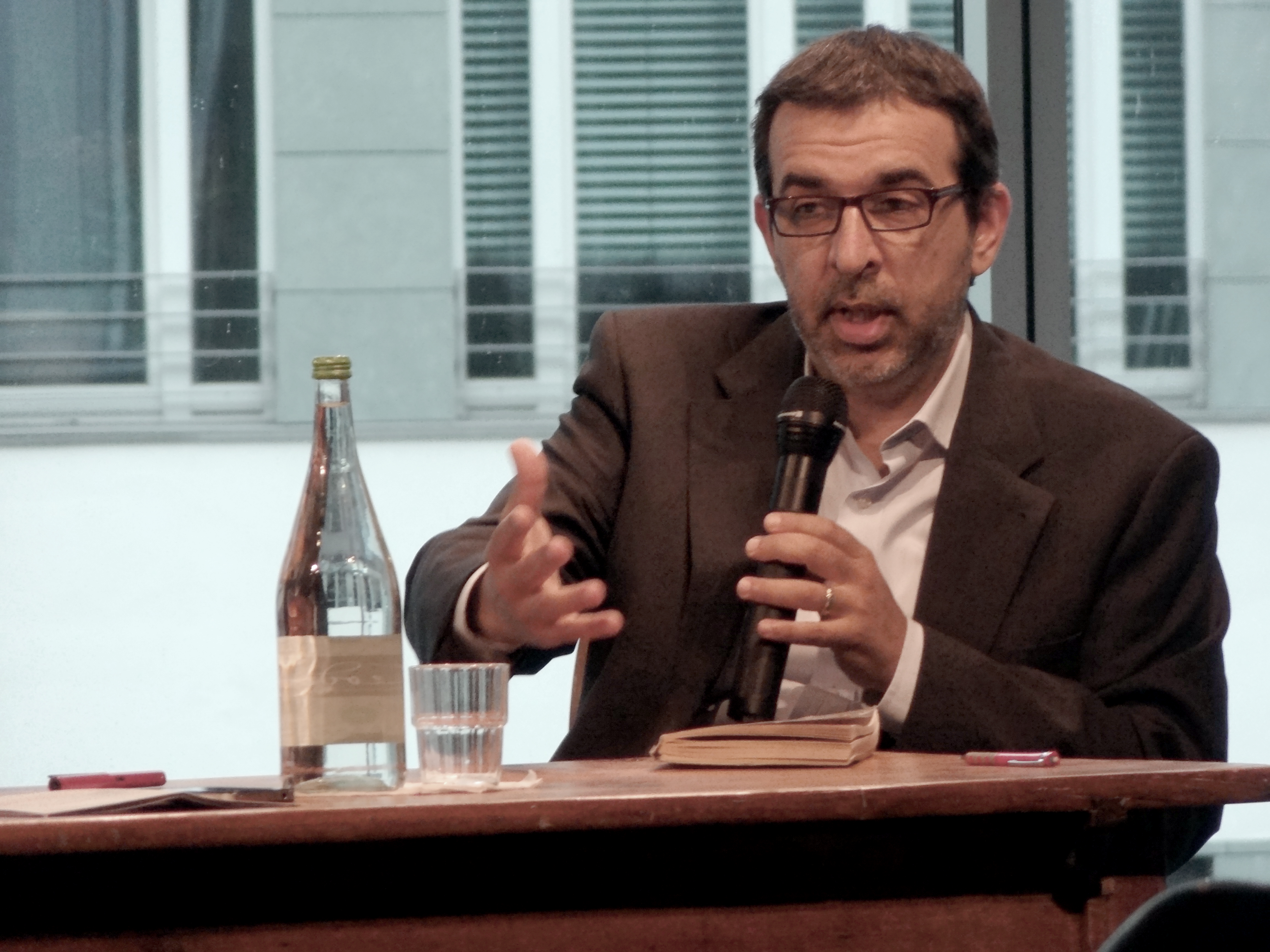
- Ezzedine C. Fishere in Berlin (2012)
- Born: October 22, 1966 (age 59); Kuwait City, Kuwait
- Citizenship: Egyptian
- Education: Bachelor's in Political Science (1987) Cairo University; Diploma in Administration (1992) ÉNA; Master's in International Relations (1995) University of Ottawa; Ph.D in Political Science (1998) Université de Montréal
- Occupations: academic at Dartmouth College, novelist and a contributing columnist to The Washington Post.
- Children: 3
- Writing career
- Language: Arabic
- Notable works: Embrace by Brooklyn Bridge; Exit; The Egyptian Assassin

Ezzedine Choukri Fishere (Arabic: عزالدين شكري فشير) (born 1966 in Kuwait City) is an Egyptian novelist, diplomat and academic.

== Early life and career ==
Fishere was born to Egyptian parents working in Kuwait. At the age of two, he returned to Egypt with his mother and siblings while his father stayed back in Kuwait to support the family. Fishere grew up in Mansura. He graduated from Mansoura Secondary School in Dakahlia at the age of 16. In 1987, he graduated from the political science department at Cairo University, and joined Al-Ahram Centre for Political Studies. Two years later, he had completed his military service and joined the Foreign Service. In 1992, he obtained an International Diploma in Administration from École Nationale d'Administration in Paris, then a Masters in International Relations in 1995 from the University of Ottawa, and finally a PhD in political science from Université de Montréal in 1998

Fishere worked intermittently as an Egyptian diplomat. In 1989, he was in the cabinet of Boutros Boutros-Ghali, then in the Egyptian embassy in Tel Aviv, Israel from 1999 to 2001, and a counselor to the Egyptian foreign minister Ahmed Aboul Gheit from 2005 to 2007.

He also worked as a political advisor to the United Nations Special Envoy to the Middle East during the Second Intifada (2001-2004). He joined the UN Advance Mission to Sudan UNAMIS and contributed to establishing the first UN peacekeeping mission in that country after the signing of the Naivasha peace agreement in 2005. During his year in Sudan, Fishere was the UN's focal point for the Darfur negotiations in Addis Ababa, Ndjamena and Abuja. Fishere was the political advisor to the 2004 UN fact-finding mission to Lebanon investigating the assassination of former Lebanese prime minister Rafik Hariri.

In 2007, Fishere left the diplomatic service and started teaching political science at the American University in Cairo He also wrote frequently for the press, both in Arabic and in English.

In 2011, the first Transitional Government asked him to lead the "Supreme Council for Culture" with a view to restructuring it. While he has never joined a political party, he has provided political advice since January 2011 to Egyptian democratic political groups and presidential candidates.

Between 2011 and 2013, the Secretary-General of the League of Arab States, Nabil El-Araby, asked him to coordinate an Independent Panel on Restructuring the Arab League, chaired by Lakhdar Brahimi, and to write its report.

Fishere supported the removal of Muslim Brothers from power in June 2013, claiming that they have used democratic means to establish a religious authoritarian rule, and hoped that the new transitional period (which followed the removal of the Muslim Brothers from power) would lead Egypt along the way of democratic transformation. He accepted to serve as an independent member (and chair) of a short-lived government committee to monitor democratic transition (September – November 2013). But when that government issued a controversial protest law restricting freedom of expression, he publicly denounced it. Fishere continued to denounce authoritarianism in his writings but withdrew from active public life since the election of General Abdul Fattah Al-Sisi as president in May 2014.

In September 2016, he moved to the United States where he teaches Middle East politics at Dartmouth College. He continues to write fiction and political opinion pieces, notably in the Washington Post.

== Novels ==
Fishere's first novel, The Killing of Fakhredine (مقتل فخرالدين) was published in 1995, The novel narrates the quasi-mythical life of Fakhredine, who disappeared mysteriously in a Cairo slum in the early 1990s.

Pharaonic Journeys (أسفار الفراعين) was published in 1999. Interweaving the stories of nine characters trapped in an endless journey inside and outside Egypt, this novel narrates their attempts to deal with an imaginary apocalyptic Egypt that is stricken by environmental disasters, epidemics, social decay and abject poverty, exacerbated by the repression of a failed state.

He published his third novel, Intensive Care Unit (غرفة العناية المركزة) in 2008. The novel follows the stories of four characters trapped under the rubble of the Egyptian Consulate in Khartoum, which has been blown up by jihadis. Intensive Care Unit was nominated for the Arabic Booker Prize.

His following novel The Egyptian Assassin (بوعمر المصري) tells the story of a man who flees injustice in his country hoping to return one day and reverse it. His journey takes him from the backstreets of Cairo to the Muslim suburbs of Paris, to the jihadi world in Sudan and Afghanistan, and back to Egypt.

The critic Salah Fadl said that "with these four novels, Fishere has entered the canon of Arabic literature."

The Egyptian Assassin, together with The Killing of Fakhredine were turned into an Arabic TV series in 2018.

Fishere's fifth novel, Embrace on Brooklyn Bridge (عناق عند جسر بروكلين), was published in 2011 and shortlisted for the Arabic Booker Prize (2012). It is described by critics as a novel about identity complexity. Embrace on Brooklyn Bridge was translated to English and published by American University in Cairo Press. Reviewing it, Michelle Ann Schingler wrote: "Fishere’s novel is Mrs. Dalloway for an age when conversations about immigration, particularly from Arab nations, dominate—a gripping portrait of the tenuous spaces that marginalized populations are made to occupy, and a searing examination of the struggle to belong".

Fishere's following novel, The Exit (باب الخروج), tells the story of Egypt's revolution.

His seventh novel, All That Nonsense (كل هذا الهراء), is about the new Egypt that is struggling to come out of the old. Evoking The Arabian Nights, a male Scheherazade, Omar, tells Amal, his Egyptian-American one-and-half-night-stand lover who is about to be deported, the stories that happened to his friends during her one-year imprisonment.

== Bibliography ==
- 1995: Maktal Fakhreddine, (Arabic: مقتل فخرالدين, "The Killing of Fakhredine")
- 1999: Asfar Al-Fara'een, (Arabic: أسفار الفراعين, "Pharanoic Journeys")
- 2008: Ghorfet Al-Enaya Al-Murakazza, (Arabic: غرفة العناية المركزة, "Intensive Care Unit")
- 2010: Abu Omar Al-Masry, (Arabic: أبو عمر المصري)
- 2011: E'nak E'nda Jesr Brooklyn, (Arabic: عناق عند جسر بروكلين, "Embrace by Brooklyn Bridge")
- 2012: Bab Al-Khorouj, (Arabic: باب الخروج, "Exit")
- 2017: All That Nonsense (Arabic: كل هذا الهرا ء)
