= Alison Darcy =

Research psychologist and technologist

Alison M. Darcy
- Darcy at Web Summit 2021.
- Education: University College Dublin
- Known for: Mental health
- Scientific career
- Workplaces: Stanford University
- Thesis: An evaluation of a group cognitive behavioural theraputic intervention for inpatient adults with anorexia nervosa : exploring symptom change and the patients' perspective (2007)

Alison Darcy is a research psychologist and technologist. She is the Founder and President of Woebot Health, a company which provides digital therapeutics and behavioural health products.

== Early life and education ==
Darcy was an undergraduate student in Ireland at the University College Dublin, where she specialised in psychology. After completing her studies, Darcy became interested in computer science, so moved to London to work in an investment bank as a software developer. In 2023, Darcy was named to the TIME100 AI List for her impactful work combining artificial intelligence and mental health through her company, Woebot Health. The investment bank was acquired by a larger bank during the dot com crash, leaving Darcy looking for new options. In particular, she was interested in combining her skills in technology with her talent for psychology, and worked with a charity to support people with eating disorders.

Darcy wanted to find a way to "safely and effectively" integrate AI usage into healthcare. At the time there was very little online support for people with mental health conditions, and accessing care was particularly difficult for people in rural communities. Working with one of her colleagues in software development, Darcy built an online support network, providing round-the-clock support to people who needed to talk. She eventually returned to University College Dublin for a graduate degree, and eventually a doctoral research programme in clinical psychology. Her research considered the effectiveness of group cognitive behavioural therapy. After a year in London, Darcy moved to the United States, where she joined Stanford University as a postdoctoral researcher in clinical psychology. At Stanford, she collaborated with Andrew Ng, and became interested in whether artificial intelligence can meaningfully help people with mental health conditions. In her clinical practise, Darcy was increasingly concerned that there was no continuity between leaving in patient care and entering the real world.

== Research and career ==
Darcy continued to research eating disorders, with a particular focus on anorexia nervosa. She recognised that very few clinicians had the appropriate training to treat patients with the condition. She pioneered the use of online learning methods to train clinicians. She became increasingly aware that to combine technology and psychology she would have to do it outside academia, so left to start her own company.

In 2017 Darcy founded Woebot Health, an artificial intelligence powered chatbot that helps users monitor their moods and manage their mental health. More specifically, Woebot is a dynamic and individualized instrument via which patients can forge a therapeutic connection. It maintains the scalability and agency that define self-help techniques while enhancing (rather than replacing) human healthcare providers and unlocking the therapeutic power associated with guiding. This AI acts like an automatic therapist that has been found to reduce symptoms of anxiety and depression in two weeks. Through using a CBT framework, as well as other therapeutic techniques, Woebot is able to enhance the user's mental health. The board of Woebot is chaired by Ng. Darcy wants to make mental health services and the trainings of cognitive behavioural therapy accessible to all.

In April 2020, Woebot added COVID-19 support, expanding its CBT support to include interpersonal psychotherapy. Following that additional support, Woebot has been suspected to reduce depression and anxiety symptoms within as little as the passage of two weeks. In the fall of 2023, Darcy was added to the 2023 Time100 AI List, which aims to highlight individuals that have made significant and impactful artificial intelligence advancements. By 2023, $123.5 million had already been made by Woebot, which already had over 1 million users. In late June 2025, Darcy decided to shut down Woebot's therapy chatbot due to regulatory challenges. The bot was unable to keep up with the rate of technological advancement in the AI space. While Darcy did decide to shut the chatbot down, she has found more ways to give back to the field. She has written many books when discussing the field, and she serves as a lecturer at Stanford University

== Selected publications ==
- Fitzpatrick, Kathleen Kara; Darcy, Alison; Vierhile, Molly (2017). "Delivering Cognitive Behavior Therapy to Young Adults With Symptoms of Depression and Anxiety Using a Fully Automated Conversational Agent (Woebot): A Randomized Controlled Trial". JMIR Mental Health. 4 (2): e19. doi:10.2196/mental.7785. PMC 5478797. PMID 28588005.
- Darcy, Alison M.; Louie, Alan K.; Roberts, Laura Weiss (9 February 2016). "Machine Learning and the Profession of Medicine". JAMA. 315 (6): 551–552. doi:10.1001/jama.2015.18421. ISSN 0098-7484. PMID 26864406.
- Aspen, Vandana; Darcy, Alison M.; Lock, James (1 August 2013). "A review of attention biases in women with eating disorders". Cognition and Emotion. 27 (5): 820–838. doi:10.1080/02699931.2012.749777. ISSN 0269-9931. PMC 3610839. PMID 23228135.
