= Tamir Hayman =

Israeli major general

- תמיר היימן
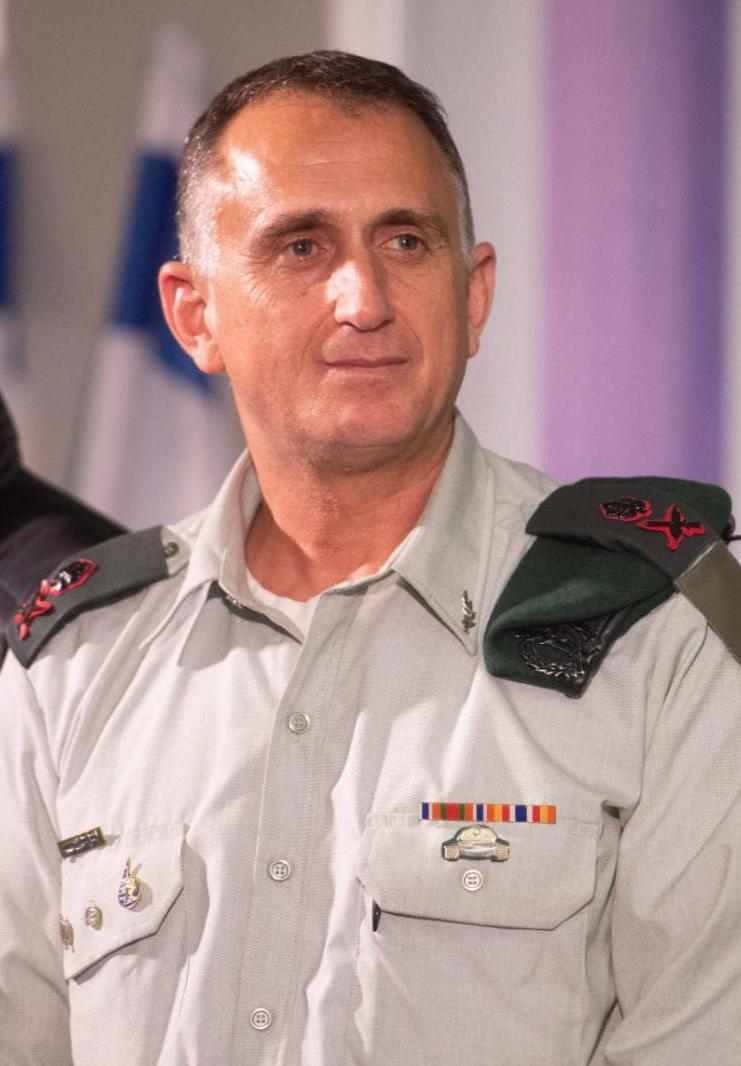
- Born: Israel
- Military career
- Allegiance: Israel
- Branch: Israel Defense Forces
- Service years: 1987–2021
- Rank: Aluf (major general)
- Conflicts: South Lebanon conflict (1985–2000); First Intifada; Second Intifada; 2006 Lebanon War; Operation Cast Lead; Operation Pillar of Defense; Operation Protective Edge; Operation Guardian of the Walls

Tamir Heyman (Hebrew: תמיר היימן; born in 1968) is a reserve IDF officer with the rank of Aluf who serves as the director of the Institute for National Security Studies. He has served as the head of Military Intelligence Directorate, as the commander of the Northern Corps, and as the commandant of the IDF military colleges.

== Biography ==
Tamir Heyman grew up in Bat Yam and enlisted in the IDF in 1987, in the Armored Corps. He served as a communications operator in Battalion 82 of Brigade 7 and participated in combat in South Lebanon when his unit was stationed at the Reihan outpost. He later completed a tank commanders course. After an officers' course, he returned to the battalion as a platoon commander and later served as an instructor in the Armored Corps officers' course. After serving as an operational company commander, he returned to the officers' course as a company commander.

After studying at the IDF Command and Staff College between 1996 and 1998, he served as the deputy commander of Battalion 77 of Brigade 7, as the operations officer in the 36th Division, as the commander of Battalion 75 of Brigade 7, and as the commander of Battalion 196 in the Armored Corps officers' course. He was promoted to the rank of colonel and went on to study at the National Security College while concurrently commanding the "Re'em" Formation, an armored brigade in the reserves. He was the project officer for the separation barrier in the Central Command and the commander of the Ephraim Brigade. In 2005, he was appointed as the commander of Brigade 460, the Armored Corps training brigade, a position he held until after the Second Lebanon War. In 2006 he was appointed as the operations officer of the Northern Command, and in 2008, he was promoted to the rank of Brigadier General and replaced Yoav Har-Even as the commander of the Explosive Ordnance Disposal Formation, an armored division. Concurrently, Heyman served as the commander of the Ground Forces Command Training Center and as the commander of the Brigade Commanders' Course.

In July 2011, he was appointed as the commander of the Ga'ash Formation, a regular armored division in the Golan Heights, and served in this position until July 2013. His tenure was characterized by the division's handling of the spillover of the Syrian Civil War into Israeli territory, including shooting incidents at IDF forces, mortar shell falls, and Israeli retaliatory fire that destroyed Syrian military positions. A field hospital was established on the border to receive wounded from Syria, abandoned outposts were manned, and infrastructure work was carried out to strengthen the border fence.

2013-2015 Heyman served as the head of the Doctrine and Training Division in the Military Intelligence Directorate. On February 5, 2015, Heyman was promoted to the rank of Major General, and a few days later, on February 8, he entered his role as the commander of the Northern Corps. In August 2015, he was appointed as the commander of the military colleges while also serving as the corps commander.

On March 28, 2018, he took up his position as the head of Military Intelligence. He served in this role during various operations, including the special operation in Khan Yunis, Operation Black Belt, and Operation Guardian of the Walls. On October 5, 2021, he completed his role[9] and was discharged from the IDF.

=== After completing his military service ===
In 2022, he took up his position as the director of the Institute for National Security Studies (INSS), replacing Udi Dekel.

=== Evaluation of post-October 7 strategic doctrine ===
"The 'New' National Security Concept: Conceptualization and Questions for Discussion," an INSS policy paper published by Hayman in October 2026, outlines ten fundamental tenets of Israel's post-October 7 operations.

By treating Arab peace agreements as short-term, localized arrangements and deprioritizing regional peace, Hayman's synthesis deviates from conventional security paradigms. Additionally, he warned against pursuing complete military autarky without the backing of the United States and pointed out that the paper was designed to spark intense public discussion.

== Personal life ==
Heiman is a graduate of the Inter-Arms College for Command and Staff, with a bachelor's degree in Political Science and Economics from Bar-Ilan University and a master's degree from the National Security College and the University of Haifa. He is married with two children and resides in Bat Hefer. His brother is a judge at the Tel Aviv District Court, Avraham Heiman.
