= Jonathan LaPook =

American physician (born 1953)

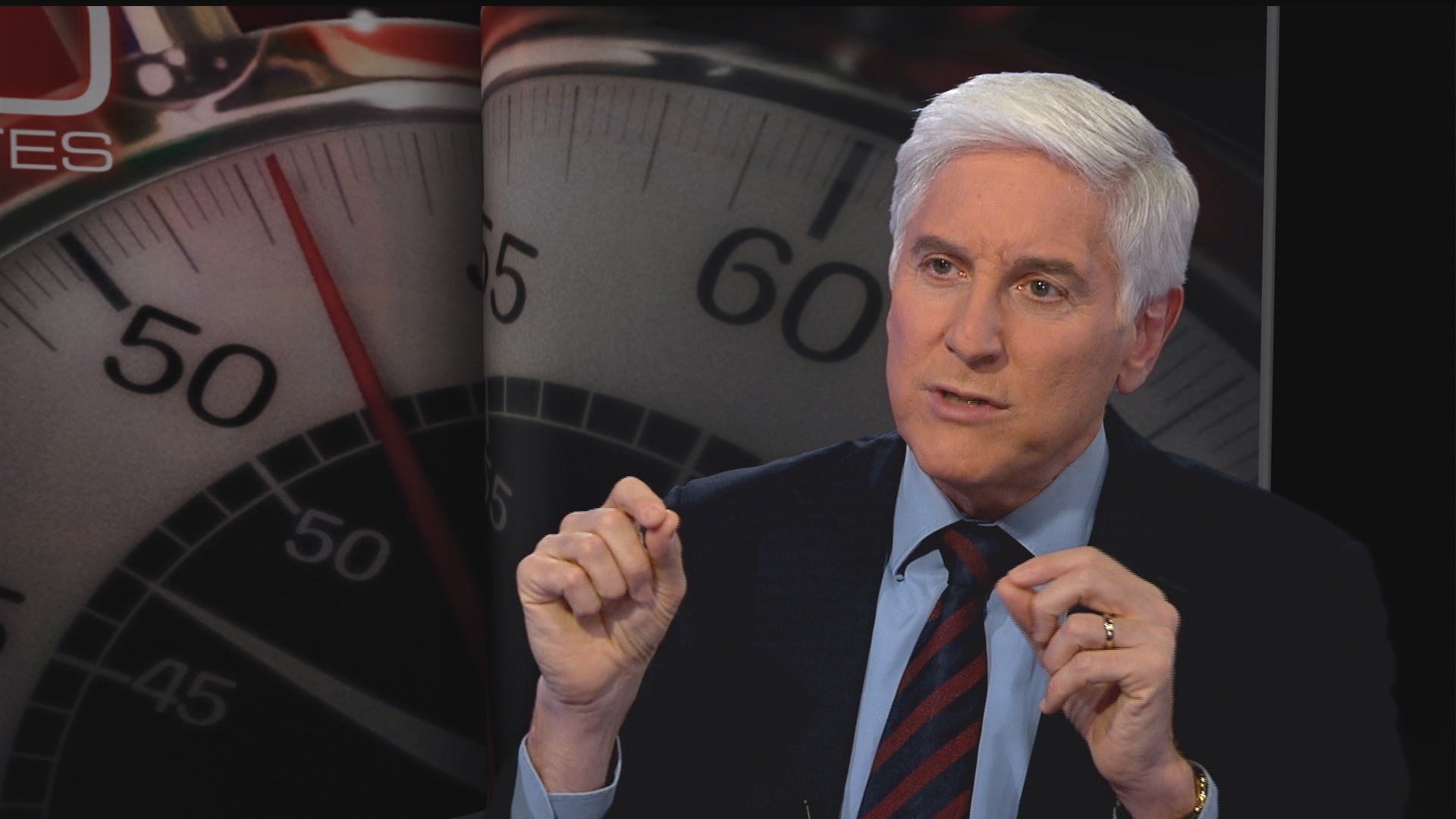

Chief medical correspondent for CBS News
- Incumbent
- assumed position 2013

Personal details
- Born: Jonathan David LaPook Mineola, New York, U.S.
- Profession: physician

Jonathan David LaPook is an American board-certified physician in internal medicine and gastroenterology who is the Chief Medical Correspondent for CBS News. Named the Mebane Professor of Gastroenterology in 2013, he is Professor of Medicine at NYU Langone Medical Center and has an active medical practice in New York City. He joined CBS News in 2006.

When LaPook joined CBS News, The New York Observer reported on the hire as a trend away from professional journalists covering expert fields and a tendency toward hiring subject matter experts to do journalism.

== Early life and education ==
LaPook was born in Mineola, N.Y., on Long Island. He is the son of Elsa (née Eisenbud) and Sidney LaPook, a dentist and World War II veteran (1928–2018). He has three sisters: Judith LaPook, Nancy LaPook Diamond, and Corinne LaPook. He graduated with honors from Yale University and Columbia College of Physicians and Surgeons, receiving his M.D. in 1980. He completed a residency in internal medicine and a fellowship in gastroenterology at the New York-Presbyterian Hospital/Columbia University Medical Center.

He is married to Kate Lear, daughter of legendary TV producer Norman Lear. The couple has two sons.

== Career ==
=== Medicine ===
In 1986, LaPook began an active practice in gastroenterology and internal medicine at Columbia. He continued to teach at Columbia University Medical Center and became Professor of Medicine. He is a published author, and is especially focused on educating the public about health issues. LaPook is the founder of the NYU Langone Empathy Project, whose goal is to improve the interaction between health professionals and patients by creating a curriculum on video that teaches empathy to doctors, nurses, and all members of the healthcare community.

=== Journalism ===
In 2006, LaPook joined anchor Katie Couric at the "CBS Evening News" as Medical Correspondent. In 2013, he was named Chief Medical Correspondent for CBS News, appearing regularly on CBS Mornings," the "CBS Evening News" CBS Radio, and CBS News Streaming. He has interviewed patients, healthcare providers, researchers, thought-leaders, and government officials, including President Obama twice, in an attempt to provide insight and perspective on a wide range of health and medical subjects.

=== Education ===
In 2013, LaPook founded The Empathy Project at NYU Langone Medical Center, whose premise is that a good interpersonal relationship between patient and caregiver is critical to excellent medical care. The Empathy Project seeks to promote a culture of empathy in medicine—to educate patients to expect and demand it, and to train healthcare providers to be more humane and effective. It has brought together leaders in medicine, technology and entertainment, and create short films that will highlight important issues between patient and medical caregiver.

=== Awards ===
LaPook has won five Emmy awards for his coverage in 2012 of the national shortage of drugs, for team coverage in 2013 of the Boston Marathon bombings, 2019 for Sunday Morning, Outstanding Program; in 2020 for Sunday Morning, Outstanding Program and in 2021 for CBS Mornings/CBS This Morning, Outstanding Live News Program. LaPook was also named a George Foster Peabody Award finalist in 2018 for two 60 Minutes investigative reports on the USA Gymnastics sexual abuse scandal. In September, 2025, Dr. LaPook gave the keynote address and was awarded the Lifetime Achievement Award from the Stoneygate Centre for Empathic Healthcare. In 2024 he received two awards for CBS News: Hospitals in Peril: https://www.headlinerawards.org/2024-tv-radio/ and New York Press Club award . He has won two Edward R. Murrow Awards for "Best Broadcast" in 2007 and 2013. He also won a 2015 New York Press Club Award for Journalism for "Eye on Ebola" WCBS-AM News Team Special. Dr. LaPook was awarded a Drama Desk Award https://dramadesks.com/ for his work as medical contributor to “Stars in the House” in 2020, keeping the entertainment community informed throughout the coronavirus pandemic. In 2010, he was recognized in the Webby Awards for his documentary series Doc Dot Com.
