= Pete Stavros =

American investor

Pete Stavros is the global co-head of private equity at Kohlberg Kravis Roberts. He is known for developing a employee-ownership program at the company, in which employees of companies owned by KKR will receive payouts when KKR sells them.

== Biography ==
Pete Stavros grew up near Chicago, IL. His father Harry was a union leader at a construction company, and Pete credited his father's labor advocacy as the inspiration for his eventual worker-ownership plan. Stavros later attended Harvard Business School, where he researched worker ownership and wrote a thesis about employee stock ownership plans.

Stavros joined KKR in 2005 and launched the worker ownership model at KKR in 2011. It has since been implemented for 85 companies, including Ingersoll Rand Inc., CHI Overhead Doors, and Minnesota Rubber & Plastics. Stavros said that the companies participating in this program were among the more profitable acquisitions in KKR's portfolio.

Stavros was promoted to global co-head in 2019. In 2021, Stavros launched Ownership Works, a nonprofit that seeks to promote shared ownership of companies. He and his wife pledged $10 million toward the organization.

Some industry figures and worker's cooperative leaders, including Jim Bonham of the Employee Stock Ownership Plan (ESOP) Association, have criticized Stavros's program as a way to whitewash the reputation of the private equity industry.
