= Institute for National Security Studies (Israel) =

Israeli research institute and think tank

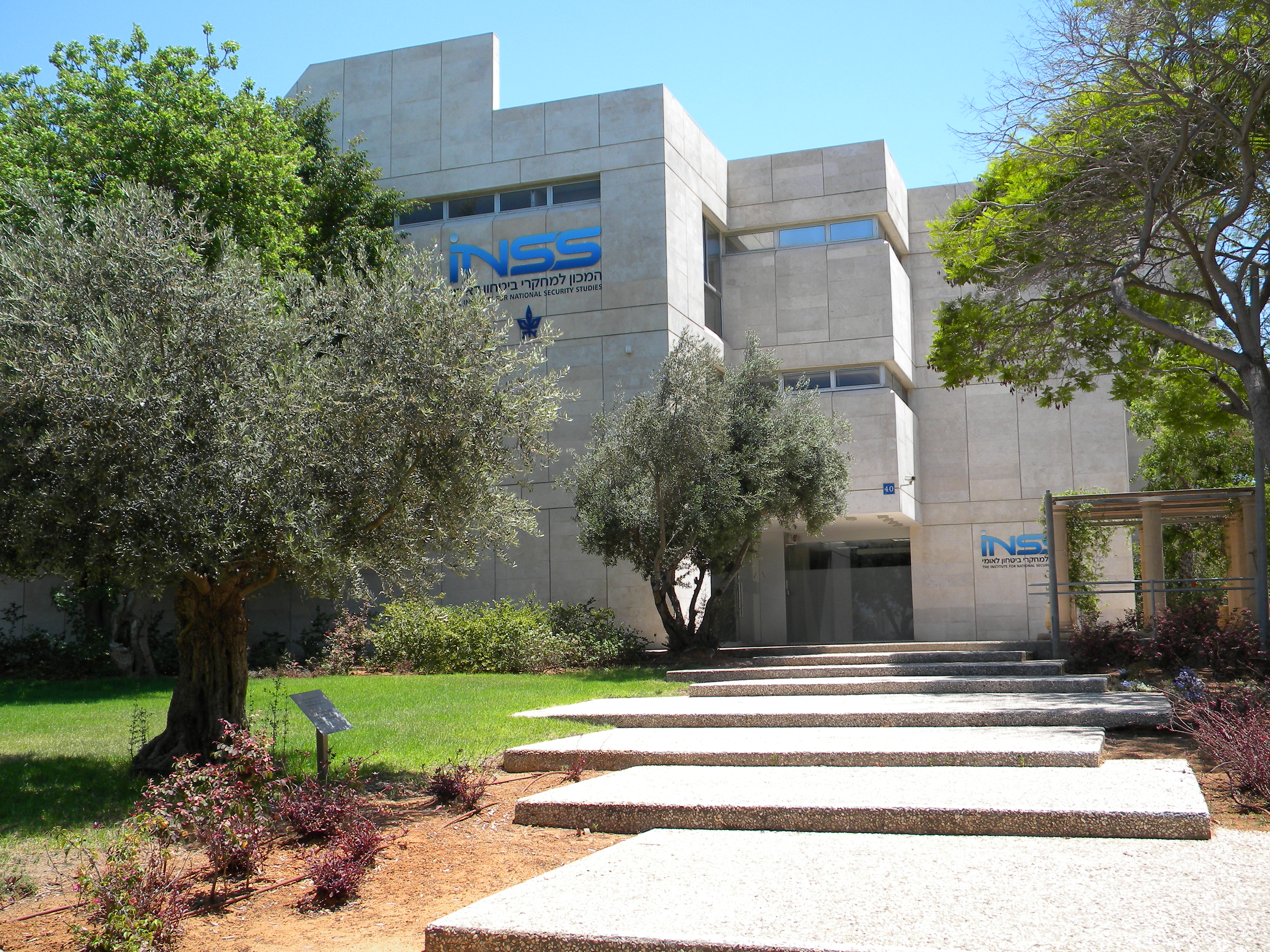
- INSS campus at Tel Aviv University
- Formation: 1977; 49 years ago
- Location: Tel Aviv, Israel
- Executive Director: Tamir Hayman
- Website: www.inss.org.il
- Formerly called: Jaffe Center

The Institute for National Security Studies (INSS) is an independent think tank affiliated with Tel Aviv University in Israel that conducts research and analysis of national security matters such as military and strategic affairs, terrorism and low intensity conflict, military balance in the Middle East, and cyber warfare. It is considered Israel's leading security think tank.

== History ==
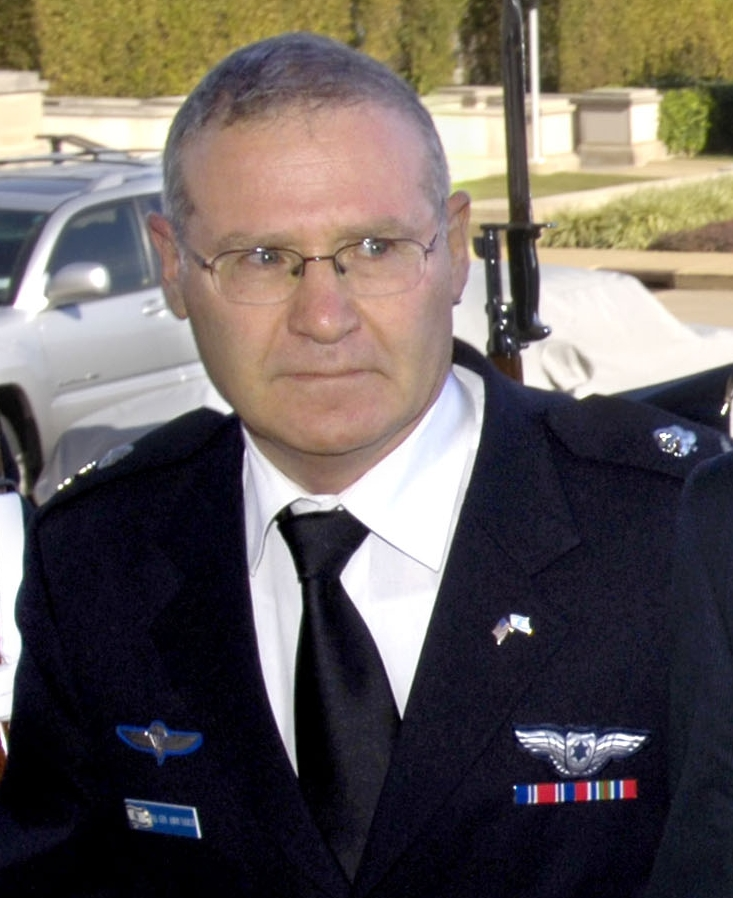
General (ret.) Amos Yadlin, former head of the Institute

INSS was founded as the Center for Strategic Studies in 1977 by General (ret.) Aharon Yariv, former IDF Military Intelligence Chief, as "Israel's first public forum for debating strategic and military affairs".

Until 2021, the INSS was led by Major General (ret.) Amos Yadlin, when Manuel Trajtenberg, the former head of the National Economic Council and Member of Knesset for the Zionist Union party, took over leadership. Since May 2022, Major General (res.) Tamir Hayman has held the position of Executive Director.

== Reception ==
In the University of Pennsylvania's Global Go To Think Tanks Report, INSS was ranked as the best think tank in the Middle East and North Africa in 2019 and 2020. It ranked as the 12th best defense and national security think tank, and the 48th best non-U.S think tank in the world. The institute's study "The History of Israeli–Palestinian Negotiations" was among the list of "Best Policy Study/Report Produced by a Think Tank" for the 2013–2014 term.

== Tshetshik Prize ==
The Lt. Col. Meir and Rachel Tshetshik Prize in Security Studies, also Tshetshik Prize for Studies on Israeli Security (and sometimes wrongly called Chechic Award), is awarded annually for books and research publications "directly related to Israel's national security challenges". In 2023, the prize was accompanied by prize money amounting to 30,000 NIS.

== Notable affiliates ==
- Emily Landau, top Israeli expert on arms control

== See also ==
- National Security College (Israel)
