= Katie Couric =

American journalist (born 1957)

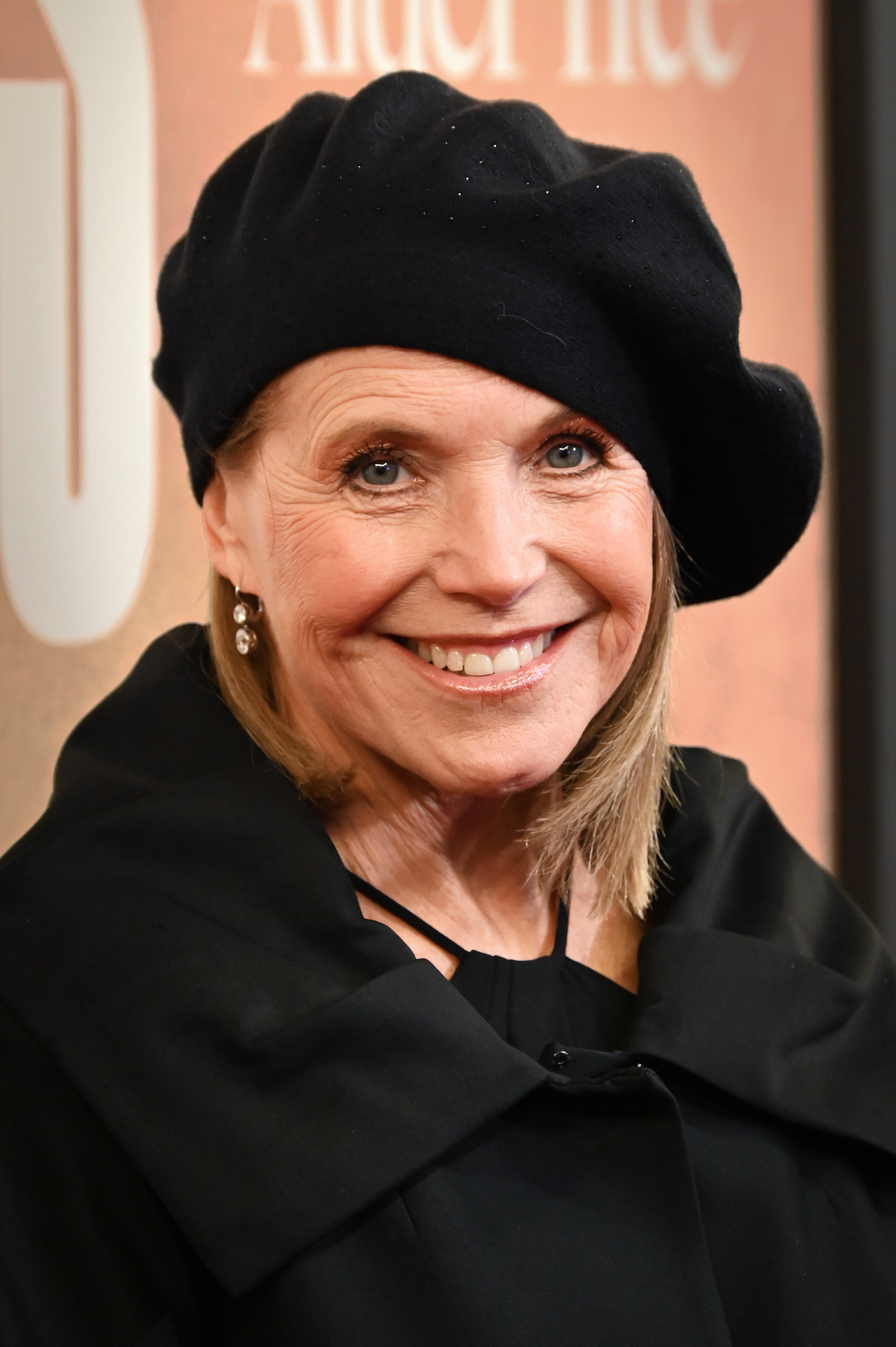
- Couric in 2025
- Born: January 7, 1957 (age 69); Arlington, Virginia, U.S.
- Education: University of Virginia (BA)
- Occupations: Journalist; news presenter; author
- Years active: 1979–present
- Notable credit(s): Today; CBS Evening News; 60 Minutes; Katie; Yahoo! News
- Spouses: Jay Monahan (m. 1989; died 1998) John Molner (m. 2014)
- Children: 2
- Relatives: Emily Couric (sister); Jeff Wadlow (nephew)
- Awards: Television Hall of Fame (2004)
- Website: katiecouric.com

Katherine Anne Couric (/ˈkɜːrɪk/ KURR-ik; born January 7, 1957) is an American journalist and presenter. She is founder of Katie Couric Media, a multimedia news and production company. She also publishes a daily newsletter, Wake Up Call. Since 2016, she has hosted the podcast Next Question with Katie Couric.

Couric has been a television host at all of the Big Three television networks in the United States, and in her early career she was an assignment editor for CNN. She worked for NBC News from 1989 to 2006, CBS News from 2006 to 2011, and ABC News from 2011 to 2014. She was the first solo female anchor of a major network (CBS) evening news program. From 2013 to 2017, she was Yahoo's Global News Anchor. In 2021, she appeared as a guest host for the game show Jeopardy!, the first woman to host the flagship American version of the show in its history.

In addition to her roles in television news, Couric hosted Katie, a syndicated daytime talk show produced by Disney–ABC Domestic Television from September 2012 to June 2014. Some of her most important presenting roles include co-host of Today, anchor of the CBS Evening News, and as a correspondent for 60 Minutes. Couric's 2011 book, The Best Advice I Ever Got: Lessons from Extraordinary Lives, was a New York Times bestseller. In 2004, Couric was inducted into the Television Hall of Fame.

== Early life and career ==
Katherine Anne Couric was born in Arlington, Virginia, the daughter of Elinor Tullie (née Hene), a homemaker and part-time writer, and John Martin Couric Jr., a public relations executive and news editor at The Atlanta Journal-Constitution and the United Press in Washington, D.C. Her mother was Jewish, and converted to Presbyterianism before the marriage. Couric's maternal grandparents, Bert Hene and Clara L. Frohsin, were the children of Jewish emigrants from Germany. Couric's father had French, English, Scottish, and German ancestry. She was raised Presbyterian. In a report for Today, she traced her patrilineal ancestry back to a French orphan who immigrated to the U.S. in the 19th century, and became a broker in the cotton business.

Couric attended Arlington Public Schools: Jamestown Elementary, Williamsburg Middle School, and Yorktown High School, and was a cheerleader. As a high school student, she was an intern at Washington, D.C. all-news radio station WAVA. She enrolled at her father's alma mater, the University of Virginia, in 1975, and was a Delta Delta Delta sorority sister. Couric served in several positions at UVA's daily newspaper, The Cavalier Daily. During her fourth year at UVA, Couric was chosen to live as Senior Resident of The Lawn, the heart of Thomas Jefferson's Academical Village. She graduated in 1979, with a bachelor's degree in American Studies.

== Career ==
=== Television career ===
==== Career beginnings ====
Couric's first job in 1979 was at the ABC News bureau in Washington, D.C., later joining CNN as an assignment editor. Between 1984 and 1986, she worked as a general-assignment reporter for the then-CBS affiliate WTVJ in Miami, Florida. During the following two years, she reported for WRC-TV, the NBC owned- and -operated station in Washington, D.C., work which earned her an Associated Press award and an Emmy.

==== NBC ====
Couric joined NBC News in 1989 as Deputy Pentagon Correspondent. From 1989 to 1991, Couric was an anchor substitute. She filled in for Bryant Gumbel as host of Today; Jane Pauley and Deborah Norville as co-anchor of Today; Boyd Matson, Garrick Utley, Mary Alice Williams, and Maria Shriver as co-host of Sunday Today; Chris Wallace, Garrick Utley and Tim Russert as anchor of Meet The Press, Scott Simon, Mike Schneider, Jack Ford, Jackie Nespral, Giselle Fernandez and Jodi Applegate as co-host of Weekend Today; Connie Chung, Bob Jamieson, John Palmer, Norville, Faith Daniels, Margaret Larson, Ann Curry, and Linda Vester as anchor of the former NBC News program NBC News at Sunrise. She also subbed for Daniels, Norville, and John Palmer as the news anchor on Today.

Couric returned to NBC to co-host the 2018 Winter Olympics opening ceremonies with Mike Tirico, and to provide additional Winter Olympic coverage and athlete interviews. During the opening ceremony she suggested, erroneously, that the Dutch use their skates as a normal mode of transportation during wintertime, prompting criticism and bemusement from the U.S. Embassy in the Netherlands and others. Couric apologized that her intended compliment did not "come out" as intended, which the Embassy accepted, and invited her to the Netherlands for a tour.

===== Today (1991–2006) =====
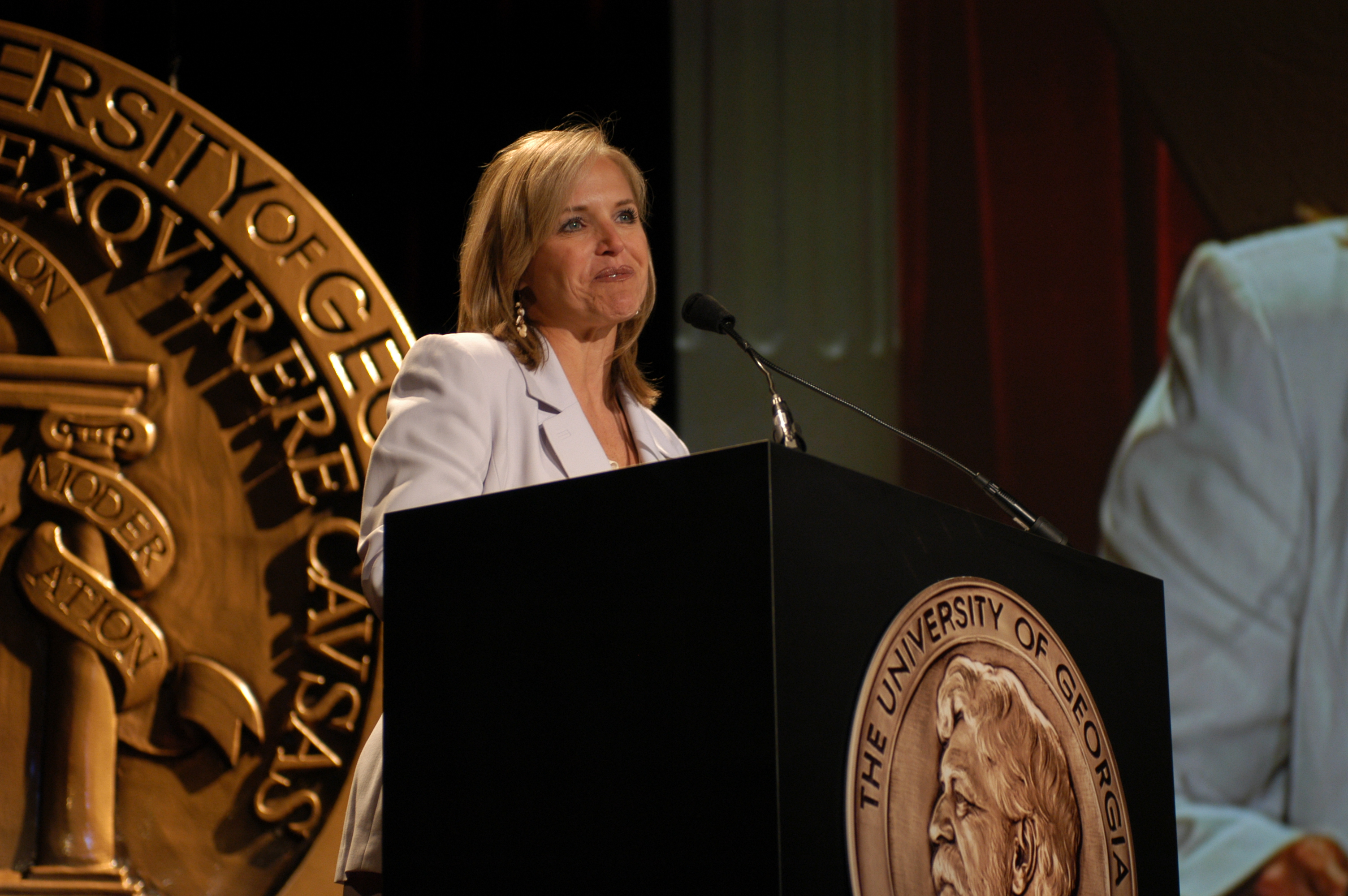
Couric hosting the 63rd Annual Peabody Awards

In 1989, Couric joined Today as national political correspondent, becoming a substitute co-host in February 1991, when Norville went on maternity leave. Norville did not return and Couric became permanent co-anchor on April 5, 1991. In 1994, she became co-anchor of Now with Tom Brokaw and Katie Couric—an evening time weekly TV newsmagazine with Tom Brokaw—which was later terminated and folded into part of Dateline NBC, where her reports appeared regularly and she was named the anchor. She remained at Today and NBC News for fifteen years until May 31, 2006, when she announced that she would be going to CBS to anchor CBS Evening News, becoming the first solo female anchor of the "Big Three" weekday nightly news broadcasts.

While at NBC, Couric occasionally filled in for Tom Brokaw and Brian Williams on NBC Nightly News. From 1989 to 1993, Couric also filled in for Connie Chung, Maria Shriver and for Garrick Utley and later Brian Williams and John Seigenthaler on the Weekend Edition of NBC Nightly News. In addition, during her time on Today, she served as a host of the annual Macy's Thanksgiving Day Parade for 14 years from 1991 to 2005. On June 17, 1997, Couric asked the Washington Post's Bob Woodward about the Clinton "Chinagate" scandal: "Are members of the media, do you think, Bob, too scandal-obsessed, looking for something at every corner?"

Couric hosted or worked on a number of news specials, like Everybody's Business: America's Children in 1995. Similar entertainment specials were Legend to Legend Night: A Celebrity Cavalcade in 1993, and Harry Potter: Behind the Magic in 2001. Couric has also co-hosted the opening ceremonies of the Olympic Games. She has broadcast with Bob Costas, beginning with the 2000 Summer Olympics.

Couric has interviewed many international political figures and celebrities, including presidents Gerald Ford, Jimmy Carter, George H. W. Bush, Bill Clinton and George W. Bush, and First Lady Barbara Bush. John F. Kennedy Jr. gave Couric his first and last interviews.

Couric has won multiple television reporting awards throughout her career, including the Peabody Award for her series Confronting Colon Cancer. Couric has also interviewed former British Prime Minister Tony Blair, U.S. Secretary of State Hillary Rodham Clinton (her first television interview), Harry Potter author J.K. Rowling, and Laura Bush.

On May 28, 2008, Couric made a return visit to Today, almost two years to the day after leaving back on May 31, 2006. She made this appearance alongside her evening counterparts, NBC Nightly News' Brian Williams & ABC World News' Charles Gibson, to promote an organization called Stand Up to Cancer and raise cancer awareness on all three major television networks; ABC, CBS & NBC. Couric, Gibson and Williams made appearances together on all three major network morning shows, first on CBS's Early Show, then on NBC's Today and finally on ABC's Good Morning America.

Couric returned for a week-long stint as co-host of Today in January 2017 to mark Matt Lauer's 20th anniversary as anchor of the program.

==== Move to CBS News ====
===== CBS Evening News (2006–2011) =====
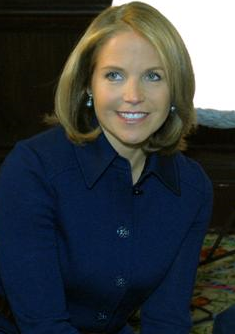
Couric in 2007

Couric announced on April 5, 2006, that she would be leaving Today. CBS confirmed later the same day that Couric would become the new anchor and managing editor of CBS Evening News. Couric would also contribute to 60 Minutes and anchor prime-time news specials for CBS. Couric earned US$15 million per year while at CBS, a salary that made her the highest paid journalist in the world, a salary similar to Barbara Walters' at ABC. She made her first broadcast as anchor and managing editor of the CBS Evening News with Katie Couric on September 5, 2006.

CBS heavily promoted Couric's arrival at the network, hoping to revive the evening news format, but there were suggestions that it backfired. Although there was much interest during her first week as anchor, CBS Evening News remained a distant third in viewership, behind ABC World News and NBC Nightly News. While Couric's ratings improved over her predecessor, Bob Schieffer, ABC's Charles Gibson widened World News' lead over Evening News.

Couric also announced CBS News's official projection for the 2008 United States Presidential Election.

The CBS Evening News with Katie Couric won the 2008 and 2009 Edward R. Murrow Award for best newscast. In 2009, Couric was awarded the Emmy Governor's Award for her broadcasting career.

She has interviewed presidents, cabinet members, celebrities, and business executives around the world, including President Barack Obama, Secretary of State Hillary Clinton, Former President George W. Bush, Former Secretary of State Condoleezza Rice, John Edwards just after the announcement that his then-wife Elizabeth's cancer had returned, Israeli Foreign Minister Tzipi Livni, Norah Jones and Michael J. Fox.

Couric led CBS News' coverage of the 2006 midterm elections, the 2008 Presidential election and conventions, and 2010 midterm elections. Couric was the first network anchor on the ground in Port au Prince after the 2010 Haiti earthquake. After the BP oil spill, Couric anchored from the Gulf Coast weekly and brought much attention to the disaster. She reported from Cairo's Tahrir Square during the Egyptian Revolution in 2011. In April 2011, she led CBS News' coverage from London for the Wedding of Prince William, Duke of Cambridge, and Catherine Middleton.

Couric was the only solo female evening news anchor in the United States, until December 21, 2009, when Diane Sawyer succeeded the retiring Charles Gibson for ABC World News. Couric and Sawyer were previous rivals as the hosts of Today and Good Morning America, respectively.

In early 2011, Couric announced that she would be leaving her anchor post at CBS Evening News when her contract expired. Couric made her final broadcast in the CBS Evening News chair on Thursday, May 19, 2011.

===== 60 Minutes (2006–2011) =====
Couric was a 60 Minutes correspondent and contributed eight to ten stories a year for the program. She was the first to interview pilot Chesley Sullenberger after the "Miracle on the Hudson" airplane landing. She also interviewed Valerie Plame, Robert Gates and Michelle Rhee for the program.

===== Palin interviews (2008) =====
The Sarah Palin interviews with Katie Couric were a series of interviews Couric taped with 2008 U.S. Republican Vice Presidential nominee Sarah Palin. The interviews were repeatedly broadcast on television before the 2008 U.S. presidential election. Couric received the Walter Cronkite Award for Journalism Excellence for the interviews. Steve Schmidt, McCain's senior campaign strategist and advisor, later reflected on the interview, saying "I think it was the most consequential interview from a negative perspective that a candidate for national office has gone through..."

===== CBS Reports (2009–2011) =====
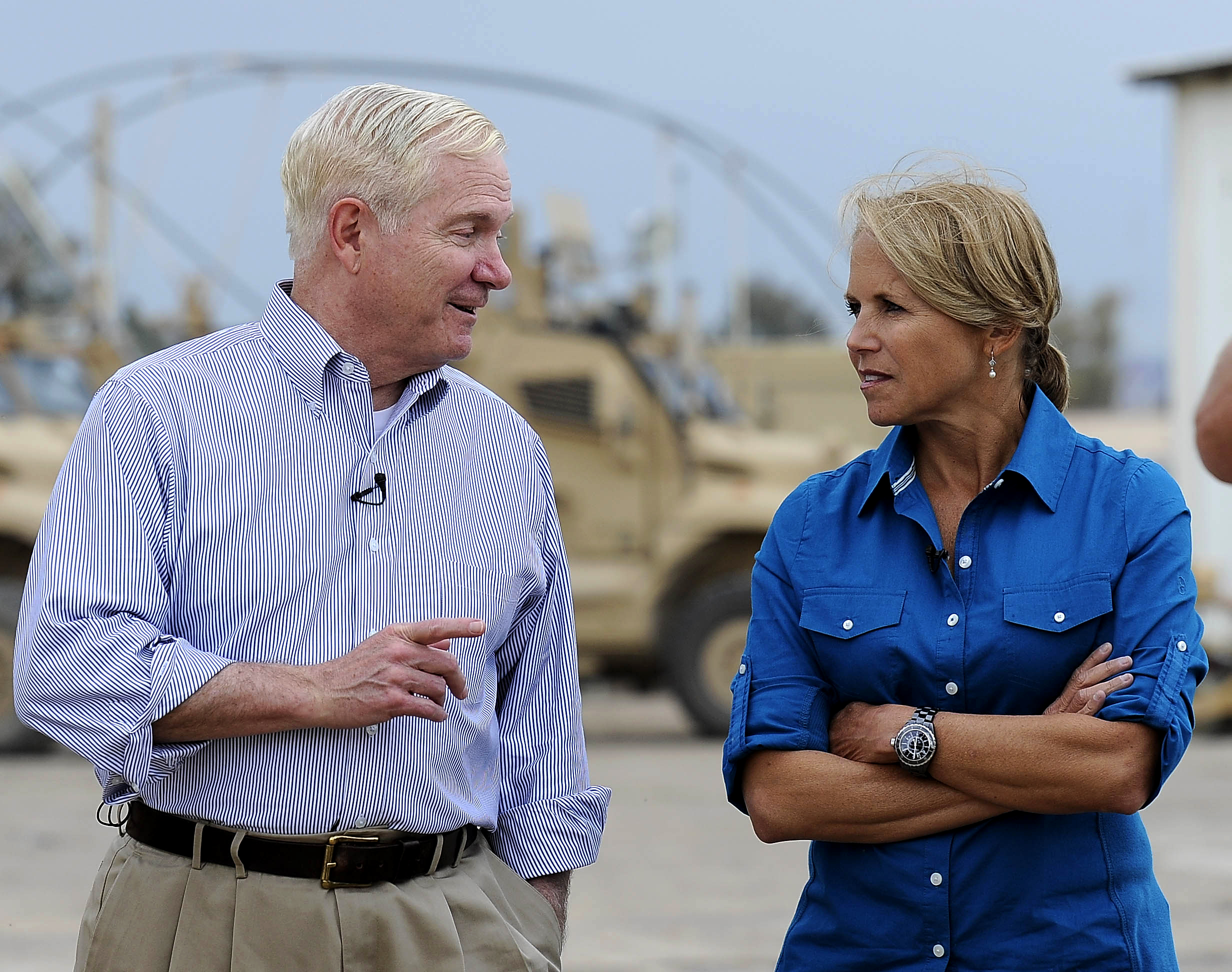
Couric with U.S. Defense Secretary Robert Gates in Mosul, Iraq, April 8, 2011

Couric was the lead reporter for two CBS Reports series, which aired across all CBS News platforms. The first series, "CBS Reports: Children of the Recession", highlighted the pain suffered by the youngest of the then ongoing Great Recession's victims. The series won the Columbia School of Journalism's Alfred DuPont Award for Excellence in Journalism. The second series, which aired in early 2010, was "CBS Reports: Where America Stands", which featured veteran CBS News correspondents reporting on major issues facing the United States in the decade ahead with research by the CBS News Polling Unit.

===== @katiecouric (2009–2011) =====
Couric hosted a weekly, one-hour interview program on CBSNews.com. Her first guest was Fox News Channel host Glenn Beck. Subsequent interviews included former U.S. vice president Al Gore, actor Hugh Jackman, recording artist Shakira, First Lady Michelle Obama, New York Times columnist Thomas Friedman, singer Justin Bieber, actress Jane Lynch, talk show host Ellen DeGeneres, actor Daniel Radcliffe, Bill Gates, former White House Chief of staff Rahm Emanuel, national Tea Party movement leader Michael Johns, football player Drew Brees, and Canadian author Malcolm Gladwell.

==== Return to ABC News ====
===== ABC News (2011–2013) =====
From 2011 to 2013, Couric was a special correspondent for ABC News, a role she has incorporated into her talk show. Her first appearance on the network was a Sarah Jessica Parker interview on Nightline. Couric co-anchored coverage of the tenth anniversary of the September 11 attacks, alongside Diane Sawyer, Christiane Amanpour, Barbara Walters, Elizabeth Vargas, George Stephanopoulos, and Robin Roberts. Couric was hosting Today on NBC at the time of the attacks, and led CBS News's coverage of the fifth anniversary. Couric also guest co-hosted The View and Live! with Regis and Kelly. Couric interviewed Lady Gaga in primetime on Thanksgiving as part of A Very Gaga Thanksgiving. In November 2011, Couric hosted a special primetime ABC news program highlighting Regis Philbin's retirement, after Philbin's 25-year tenure at ABC.

Similar to colleague Barbara Walters, Couric anchors specials for the network and for the newsmagazine 20/20. While she contributes to the news program all throughout the year, in 2011, Couric created her newly annual special The Year with Katie Couric, which is a program that marks the end of the year and covers some of the biggest newsmakers and news events of that year. This is a collaboration with People magazine, which also reflects events in the world of news, sports, politics, and major headlines that helped shape the world. This is very similar to that of Walters's iconic Barbara Walters' 10 Most Fascinating People, a year end program that marks the end of the year and acknowledges the people that had the most impact on the year at hand with interviews on their perspective of the year. As part of the special, Couric interviews fellow members of the media that can provide some insight on some events that occurred.

From April 2 to 6, 2012, Couric substituted for co-anchor Robin Roberts on ABC's Good Morning America, her first stint at hosting a morning news show since leaving Today.

===== Katie (2012–2014) =====
On June 6, 2011, ABC announced that Couric had signed a record US$40-million contract, and would begin hosting a daytime talk show for its Disney-ABC Domestic Television arm that would debut in September 2012; Couric would also contribute to ABC News programming. On August 22, 2011, it was announced that Couric's talk show would be called Katie. Katie is the second web show that Couric has been affiliated with, the first being @katiecouric on the CBS Evening News. The first episode aired on September 10, 2012.

Couric has incorporated her affiliation with the ABC News Division with her ABC Daytime show by having news colleagues Christiane Amanpour, Deborah Roberts, Mike Boettcher, Matt Gutman, Richard Besser, Marci Gonzalez, Jim Avila, Dan Abrams, Josh Elliott, Brian Ross, ABC News weather anchors Sam Champion and Ginger Zee, as well as ABC World News anchors Diane Sawyer and David Muir correspond on Katie for important news events. On the domestic end of her affiliation, Couric has had as guests The View co-host Whoopi Goldberg, Kelly Ripa and Michael Strahan of Live! with Kelly and Michael, as well as some cast members of the soap opera General Hospital.

Disney-ABC Domestic Television renewed Katie for a second season starting in fall 2013. However, in October 2013, The Hollywood Reporter wrote that Katie was close to cancellation because of a low Q Score, low ratings, and a reported disdain of her core female audience. The syndicated show averaged a 1.7 household rating during its first season and a 1.8 in the 2013–14 season. In December 2013, Disney–ABC Domestic Television announced that Katie had been canceled. The last show was taped on June 12, 2014 and the series finale aired on July 30, 2014.

=== New media ===
==== Yahoo! News (2014–2017) ====
In November 2013, Yahoo! CEO Marissa Mayer announced she had hired Couric as Global Anchor of Yahoo! News. Couric debuted in the new role on January 13, 2014, in an interview with former United States Secretary of Defense Robert Gates. She later interviewed United States Secretary of State John Kerry. In March 2015, in an effort to collaborate and to consolidate their news pools, Yahoo News and ABC News has expanded their partnership to include specials and features, with Couric and other Yahoo editors to appear in daily segments on Good Morning America. The extended partnership secured Couric as having a spot in the ABC News division, as a special contributor.

In her book Going There, Couric admitted to editing a 2016 interview with Supreme Court Justice Ruth Bader Ginsburg. The edits included removing portions of Ginsburg's statements that were critical of NFL protestors kneeling during the national anthem. Couric stated that her intent was to "protect" Ginsburg from her potentially unpopular comments as they were "unworthy of a crusader for equality".

In June 2017, after Verizon purchased Yahoo! and combined it into Oath, Couric decided to end her contract at Yahoo! News, preferring to work with them on a "project basis" only, while she continues to expand her own production company.

==== Katie Couric Media (2017–present) ====
In 2017, Couric founded her own media company, Katie Couric Media. The company produces her newsletter, Wake Up Call and along with iHeartMedia, her weekly podcast, Next Question.

=== Other work ===
In a media crossover to animated film, Couric was the voice of news-reporter "Katie Current" in the US version of the film Shark Tale. She has also made cameo appearances in Austin Powers in Goldmember (as a Georgia State Prison guard) and an episode of General Hospital (as a journalist pretending to be a doctor: a storyline she helped create). She guest-starred as herself on the CBS sitcom Murphy Brown in 1992 and in the NBC sitcom Will & Grace in late 2002, and made a cameo appearance on a Pawn Stars episode. On May 12, 2003, she traded places for a day with Tonight Show host Jay Leno. Couric also co-hosted NBC's live coverage of Macy's Thanksgiving Day Parade from 1991 until 2005. She received the Golden Plate Award of the American Academy of Achievement in 2005. Couric delivered the graduation speech at her alma mater University of Virginia on May 20, 2012, at Randolph-Macon College on June 1, 2013, and at Princeton University on June 1, 2009. She also works with Carmen Marc Valvo to help publicize the deadliness, yet preventability, of colorectal cancer. On May 16, 2010, Couric received an honorary doctor of science degree for her efforts in raising awareness of colorectal cancer and for her commitment to advancing medical research from Case Western Reserve University, and later gave the university's 2010 convocation keynote address. In 2016, she starred as herself in Sully to recreate the 60 Minutes interview for the film.

In 2011, she gave the university commencement speech at Boston University and was awarded another doctoral degree, Doctor of Humane Letters. She has also hosted a Sesame Street special, "When Families Grieve." The special, which aired on PBS on April 14, 2010, dealt with the issues that children go through when a parent dies. On February 6, 2011, Couric guest-starred on the post-Super Bowl episode of Glee, playing herself interviewing Sue Sylvester after the cheerleading team lost the championship. Sylvester sarcastically referred to Couric as "Diane Sawyer" during the segment.

Couric is the author of two children's books and a non-fiction collection of essays. Her children's books The Brand New Kid (2000) and The Blue Ribbon Day (2004) were illustrated by Marjorie Priceman and published by Doubleday. The Brand New Kid topped the New York Times best seller list for children's picture books, and was adapted into a 2006 musical by Melanie Marnich and Michael Friedman. Couric's third book, The Best Advice I Ever Got: Lessons from Extraordinary Lives, was published by Random House in 2011. The book is a collection of essays compiled over the past year by Couric; contributors include New York City Mayor Michael Bloomberg, Queen Rania of Jordan, and former Today Show colleague Matt Lauer. Couric said that a 2010 convocation keynote address she gave inspired her to write the book. To this end, all profits of the book will be donated to Scholarship America.

In December 2013, Couric ran a segment on the HPV vaccine which critics accused of being too sympathetic to the scientifically unsupported claims that this vaccine was dangerous. For example, Seth Mnookin accused her broadcast of employing false balance. In addition, Alexandra Sifferlin, of Time magazine, compared Couric to Jenny McCarthy, a well-known anti-vaccine celebrity. On December 10, 2013, a week after the original segment was aired, Couric posted an article on The Huffington Post responding to this criticism, in which she stated:

I felt it was a subject well worth exploring. Following the show, and in fact before it even aired, there was criticism that the program was too anti-vaccine and anti-science, and in retrospect, some of that criticism was valid. We simply spent too much time on the serious adverse events that have been reported in very rare cases following the vaccine. More emphasis should have been given to the safety and efficacy of the HPV vaccines.

Throughout the 2010s, Couric served as executive producer on several films. In 2014, Couric was an executive producer and narrator for the documentary Fed Up, examining the food industry and obesity in the United States. In 2016, Couric was an executive producer and narrator for the documentary Under the Gun, examining gun violence and gun control in the United States. The documentary was criticized for having an eight-second pause for "dramatic effect" inserted instead of the answer given to a question Couric posed to a gun-rights group in Virginia. Couric posted a response on the documentary's website stating, "I take responsibility for a decision that misrepresented an exchange I had with members of the Virginia Citizens Defense League (VCDL)", and she included a transcript of the response she received. Later that year, the VCDL filed a defamation lawsuit for $12 million against Couric and the film's director, Stephanie Soechtig, for continuing to promote and distribute the film without correcting the pause. The lawsuit was dismissed after a Virginia judge determined that the film scene was neither false nor defamatory. In 2015 Couric founded Katie Couric Media, a film production company which has partnered with National Geographic to produce several documentaries. The first of these, Gender Revolution, premiered in 2017. She was also an executive producer of Flint, a 2017 Lifetime drama about the Flint, Michigan, water crisis. In 2018, Couric hosted a docudrama series titled America Inside Out with Katie Couric, which was telecast on the National Geographic Channel.

Couric is a member of the Council on Foreign Relations. She is also a member of the Peabody Awards board of directors, which is presented by the University of Georgia's Henry W. Grady College of Journalism and Mass Communication.

In 2019, she served as executive producer on Netflix's true crime miniseries Unbelievable.

Couric signed on to serve as a substitute host of Jeopardy! in January 2021 following the death of Alex Trebek. Her episodes aired from March 8 to March 19.

== Public image ==
Couric has been dubbed "America's Sweetheart," largely due to her co-anchor role for 15 years on The Today Show. On May 12, 2003, Couric guest-hosted The Tonight Show with Jay Leno as part of a swap campaign, and had 45 percent more viewers than on other nights. She has been the only guest host used by Jay Leno on either The Tonight Show or his short-lived The Jay Leno Show. Leno filled in for her on Today that same day. CNN and the New York Daily News noted that instead of using Leno's regular solid desk, "workers cut away the front of her desk to expose her legs while she interviewed American Idol judge Simon Cowell and Austin Powers star Mike Myers".

== Personal life and charitable work ==
=== Family and relationships ===
Couric married attorney John Paul "Jay" Monahan III on June 10, 1989. She gave birth to their first daughter, in 1991; their second daughter was born in 1996. Her husband died of colorectal cancer in 1998 at the age of 42. In September 2013, she got engaged to financier John Molner after a two-year relationship. Couric married Molner in a small, private ceremony at her home in The Hamptons on June 21, 2014. The two star in the online cooking series Full Plate with Katie & John, appearing on the Sur La Table website.

Her sister Emily Couric, a Virginia Democratic state senator, died of pancreatic cancer at the age of 54 on October 18, 2001. Couric gave a eulogy at the funeral. She pointed out that it irritated Emily when people asked her if she was Katie Couric's sister. She told the mourners, "I just want you to know I will always be proud to say 'I am Emily Couric's sister'."

During a January 15, 2021 appearance on Real Time with Bill Maher, Couric revealed that she is distantly related to William Henry Harrison, the ninth president of the United States.

=== Cancer and advocacy ===
On September 28, 2022, Couric revealed that she had been diagnosed with breast cancer on June 21 of that year after a routine screening. She underwent surgery for the disease in July and began radiation treatment on September 7.

Couric had become a spokeswoman for colon cancer awareness ever since her first husband had died from the disease. She underwent a colonoscopy on-air in March 2000, and, according to a study published in 2003 in Archives of Internal Medicine, may have inspired many others to get checked as well: "Katie Couric's televised colon cancer awareness campaign was temporarily associated with an increase in colonoscopy use in two different data sets. This illustrates the possibility that a well-known individual can draw attention and support to worthwhile causes." On October 7, 2005, as part of National Breast Cancer Awareness Month, Couric broadcast her own mammogram on the Today show, in the hopes of recreating the "Couric Effect" around the issue of breast cancer. She also was very active in the National Hockey League's Hockey Fights Cancer campaign, appearing in some public service announcements and doing voice-overs for several others.

Couric was the honored guest at the 2004 Multiple Myeloma Research Foundation fall gala. As the Guest of Honor for the inaugural American Cancer Society Discovery Ball, Couric was recognized for her leadership in increasing cancer awareness and screening. In 2011, Couric became the Honorary National Chair of the National Parkinson Foundation's Moving Day campaign, a grassroots campaign to spotlight Parkinson's disease awareness on a national level. Couric's father died in 2011 at age 90 from complications due to Parkinson's disease.

In November 2023, Couric, alongside Jean Trebek (widow of Alex Trebek), launched "The Alex Trebek Fund" in partnership with Stand Up to Cancer, to support scientists working on improving screening and treatment options for pancreatic cancer.

== Bibliography ==
- Couric, Katie (2000). The Brand New Kid. New York: Doubleday. ISBN 978-0385500302.
- Couric, Katie (2004). The Blue Ribbon Day. New York: Doubleday. ISBN 978-0385512923.
- Couric, Katie (2011). The Best Advice I Ever Got: Lessons From Extraordinary Lives. New York: Random House. ISBN 978-0812992779.
- Couric, Katie (2021). Going There. New York: Little, Brown and Company. ISBN 978-0316535861.

== See also ==
- New Yorkers in journalism

== Sources ==
- Klein, Edward (2007), Katie: The Real Story, New York: Crown, ISBN 978-0-307-35351-1
- Weller, Sheila (2015). The News Sorority: Diane Sawyer, Katie Couric, Christiane Amanpour—and the (Ongoing, Imperfect, Complicated) Triumph of Women in TV News.
- NBC News April 26, 2011

Media offices
Preceded by Bob Schieffer	CBS Evening News Weekday Edition Anchor; September 5, 2006 – May 19, 2011	Succeeded by Scott Pelley
