= List of NBC personalities =

This list includes various personalities who are well known for their roles on America's NBC television network.

Richard Valeriani

George Clay, Carl Stern,

== Announcers ==
- Bill Hanrahan (1918–1996) announcer for NBC and for NBC Nightly News, Huntley/Brinkley, John Chancellor, and the Tom Brokaw eras. Guest announcer for Saturday Night Live.
- Danny Dark (1938–2004) announcer
- Ray Forrest (1916–1999) radio staff announcer for NBC, pioneered TV announcing and news broadcasting
- Howard Reig (1921–2008) announcer for NBC Nightly News since the Tom Brokaw era. Was replaced by actor Michael Douglas.
- Don Pardo (1918–2014) announcer for Saturday Night Live, as well as former announcer for The Price Is Right, Jeopardy!, and WNBC's Live at Five
- Bill Wendell (1924–1999), announcer on The Ernie Kovacs Show, To Tell the Truth, the Macy's Thanksgiving Day Parade and Late Night With David Letterman, among other assignments
- Bill Wolff (1927–2014), announcer for the soap opera Another World from 1964 to 1987, as well as WNBC staff announcer.
- Casey Kasem (1932–2014), West Coast announcer for NBC Television and staffer for KNBC. Hosted American Top 40 popular music countdown show from 1970 to 2009

=== The Today Show anchors ===
Name	Time on Today
Dave Garroway	1952–1961
Hugh Downs	1962–1971
Barbara Walters	1962–1976
Frank McGee	1971–1974
Jim Hartz	1974–1976
Tom Brokaw	1976–1981
Jane Pauley	1976–1989
Bryant Gumbel	1982–1997
Deborah Norville	1990–1991
Katie Couric	1991–2006
Matt Lauer	1997–2017
Meredith Vieira	2006–2011
Ann Curry	2011–2012
Savannah Guthrie	2012–present
Hoda Kotb	2018–2025
Craig Melvin	2025-present

=== News anchors ===
Name	Time on Today
Jim Fleming	1952–1953
Merrill Mueller	1953
Frank Blair	1953–1975
Lew Wood	1975–1976
Floyd Kalber	1976–1979
Tony Guida	1979
Chris Wallace	1982
John Palmer	1982–1989
Deborah Norville	1989
Faith Daniels	1990–1992
Margaret Larson	1992–1994
Matt Lauer	1994–1997
Ann Curry	1997–2011
Natalie Morales	2011–2016
Craig Melvin	2018–2025

=== Weather anchors ===
Name	Time on Today
Bob Ryan	1978–1980
Willard Scott	1980–1996
Al Roker	1996–present

=== Current shows and anchors ===
Today

- Savannah Guthrie and Hoda Kotb (Anchors)
- Craig Melvin (News Anchor)
- Al Roker (Meteorologist)
- Carson Daly (Popstart)

Today Third Hour

- Al Roker (Host)
- Craig Melvin (Host)
- Sheinelle Jones (Host)
- Dylan Dreyer (Host)

Today with Hoda and Jenna

- Hoda Kotb and Jenna Bush Hager (Hosts)

NBC Nightly News

- Tom Llamas (Anchor)

The Tonight Show

- Jimmy Fallon (Host)

Late Night

- Seth Meyers (Host)

==== Weekends ====
Weekend Today

- Peter Alexander (Anchor)
- Laura Jarret (Anchor)
- Joe Fryer (Feature Anchor)
- Angie Lassman (Meteorologist)

Sunday Today

- Willie Geist (Anchor)

Meet The Press

- Kristen Welker (Moderator)

Dateline NBC

- Lester Holt (Anchor)

Nightly News

- Jose Diaz-Balart (Anchor)
- Hallie Jackson (Anchor)

America's Got Talent (2006-)

- Terry Crews (Host season 14–present)
- Simon Cowell (Judge season 11–present)
- Sofia Vergara (Judge season 15–present)
- Howie Mandel (Judge season 5–present)
- Heidi Klum (Judge season 8–present)

The Voice (2011-)

- Carson Daly (Host season 1–present)
- Kelly Clarkson (Coach season 14–present)
- John Legend (Coach season 16–present)
- Blake Shelton (Coach season 1–present)
- Nick Jonas (Coach season 18–present)
- Christina Aguilera (Coach season 1-3, 5, 8, and 10)

American Ninja Warrior (2012-)

- Matt Iseman (Co-host season 2–present)
- Akbar Gbaja-Biamila (Co-host season 5–present)
- Zuri Hall (Sideline reporter season 11–present)

Little Big Shots (2016-2020)

- Steve Harvey (Host seasons 1–3)
- Melissa McCarthy (Host season 4)

World of Dance (2017-2020)

- Jenna Dewan (Host)
- Jennifer Lopez (Judge seasons 1–3)
- Derek Hough (Judge seasons 1–3)
- Ne-Yo (Judge seasons 1–3)

Making It (2018-2021)

- Amy Poehler (Co-host seasons 1–3)
- Nick Offerman (Co-host seasons 1–3)

Bring the Funny (2019)

- Amanda Seales (Host)
- Kenan Thompson (Judge season 1)
- Chrissy Teigen (Judge season 1)
- Jeff Foxworthy (Judge season 1)

Songland (2019-2020)

- Ester Dean (Co-host seasons 1–2)
- Ryan Tedder (Co-host seasons 1–2)
- Shane McAnally (Co-host seasons 1–2)

== Previous reality show hosts/judges ==
- Christina Aguilera (born 1980) Former coach of The Voice from 2011 to 2013, 2015–2016.
- Mel B (born 1975) Former co-judge of America's Got Talent from 2013 to 2019.
- Tyra Banks (born 1973) Former host of America's Got Talent from 2017 to 2019.
- Sara Bareilles (born 1979) Former co-judge of The Sing-Off from 2011.
- Nick Cannon (born 1980) Former host of America's Got Talent from 2009 to 2016.
- Miley Cyrus (born 1992) Former coach of The Voice from 2016 to 2017.
- Ben Folds (born 1966) Former co-judge of The Sing-Off from 2009 to 2013.
- Cee Lo Green (born 1974) Former coach of The Voice from 2011 to 2013.
- Alison Haislip (born 1981) Former co-host of The Voice in 2011.
- Bob Harper (born 1965) Former host and trainer of The Biggest Loser from 2004 to 2015.
- Steve Harvey (born 1957) Former host of Little Big Shots from 2016 to 2018.
- David Hasselhoff (born 1952) Former co-judge of America's Got Talent from 2006 to 2009; star of Baywatch from 1989.
- Jennifer Hudson (born 1981) Former coach of The Voice from 2017 to 2018.
- Jewel (born 1974) Former co-judge of The Sing-Off in 2009.
- Alicia Keys (born 1981) Former coach of The Voice from 2016 to 2018.
- Nick Lachey (born 1973) Former host of The Sing-Off in 2009.
- Adam Levine (born 1979) Former coach of The Voice from 2011 to 2019.
- Christina Milian (born 1981) Former co-host of The Voice in 2012.
- Piers Morgan (born 1965) Former co-judge of America's Got Talent from 2006 to 2011; first celebrity winner of The Apprentice.
- Brandy Norwood (born 1979) Former co-judge of America's Got Talent in 2006.
- Sharon Osbourne (born 1952) Former co-judge of America's Got Talent from 2007 to 2012.
- Regis Philbin (1931–2020) Former host of America's Got Talent in 2006.
- Caroline Rhea (born 1964) Former host of The Biggest Loser from 2004 to 2006.
- Nicole Scherzinger (born 1978) Former co-judge of The Sing-Off from 2009 to 2010.
- Shakira (born 1977) Former co-judge of The Voice in 2013.
- Jerry Springer (born 1944) Former host of America's Got Talent from 2007 to 2008.
- Howard Stern (born 1954) Former co-judge of America's Got Talent from 2012 to 2015; worked at WNBC radio in New York from 1982–1985.
- Shawn Stockman (born 1972) Former co-judge of The Sing-Off in 2009.
- Patrick Stump (born 1984) Former co-judge of The Sing-Off in 2014.
- Alison Sweeney (born 1976) Former host of The Biggest Loser since 2007; appears on NBC's soap-opera Days of Our Lives since 1993.
- Donald Trump (born 1946) Former host of The Apprentice and The Celebrity Apprentice. 45th President of the United States
- Usher (born 1978) Former coach of The Voice from 2013 to 2014.
- Pharrell Williams (born 1973) Former coach of The Voice from 2014 to 2016.

== Talk show hosts ==
- Steve Allen (1921–2000) Hosted Tonight Starring Steve Allen from 1954 to 1957.
- Johnny Carson (1925–2005) Hosted The Tonight Show Starring Johnny Carson from 1962 to 1992.
- Al "Jazzbo" Collins (1919–1997) Co-hosted Tonight! America After Dark, 1957
- Bob Costas (born 1952) Host of Later with Bob Costas from 1988 to 1994.
- Carson Daly (born 1973) Host of Last Call with Carson Daly from 2002 to 2019.
- Jimmy Fallon (born 1974) Host of Late Night with Jimmy Fallon 2009 to 2014. Former cast member on NBC's Saturday Night Live. Host of The Tonight Show Starring Jimmy Fallon since 2014.
- Greg Kinnear (born 1963) Host of Later with Greg Kinnear from 1994 to 1996.
- Jay Leno (born 1950) Host of The Tonight Show with Jay Leno from 1992 to 2009 and 2010 to 2014.
- David Letterman (born 1947) Former host Late Night with David Letterman 1982–1993; later joined CBS.
- Conan O'Brien (born 1963) Hosted Late Night with Conan O'Brien from 1993 to 2009, signed on to host The Tonight Show starting June 2009. later joined TBS.
- Jack Paar (1918–2004) Hosted The Tonight Show Starring Jack Paar from 1957 to 1962
- Seth Meyers (born 1973) Host of Late Night With Seth Meyers since 2014. Former cast member of Saturday Night Live as of 2014.
- Megyn Kelly (2017–2018) Host of Megyn Kelly Today and Sunday Night with Megyn Kelly

== Meteorologists ==
- Stephanie Abrams (born 1978) common fill-in for Al Roker on Today Show since 2009; Co-host of Wake Up With Al & Morning Rush on The Weather Channel.
- Dylan Dreyer (born 1981) Weekend Today Meteorologist 2013-2022
- Janice Huff (born 1960) Weekend Today Meteorologist 1996-2012
- Al Roker (born 1954) Today Show weatherman since 1996; Anchor of Wake Up With Al on The Weather Channel.
- Willard Scott (born 1934) weatherman on The Today Show from 1980 to 1998.

== Sports presenters ==
- Bob Costas (born 1952) sportscaster of Football Night in America from 2006 to 2016.
- Keith Olbermann (born 1959) sportscaster of Football Night in America from 2007 to 2010. Was also host of Countdown with Keith Olbermann on sister channel MSNBC from 2003 to 2011. Moved to CurrentTV on June 20, 2011.
- Apolo Ohno (2014–present) sportscaster

See also MLB on NBC broadcasters
