= Bob Kur =

American television journalist (born 1948)

Robert E. Kur
- Born: April 13, 1948 (age 78); Nutley, New Jersey
- Education: Ithaca College, Columbia University
- Occupation: journalist

Robert Ellis Kur (born April 13, 1948) is an American retired television journalist, born in Nutley, New Jersey.

Kur received a bachelor's degree from Ithaca College in 1970 and his masters of communications at Columbia University.

Kur's first job in journalism was for the Eastern Educational Network as a researcher, reporter and writer. WRC-TV, a Washington, D.C.–based NBC affiliate, hired Kur in 1973. He was tapped for an NBC News reporting job based in Cleveland, Ohio, in 1976. Among the topics Kur focused on during his time at NBC News were science, health, family, and trends which often appeared as reports on NBC Nightly News. He served as a fill-in host for several NBC News shows including NBC Nightly News and NBC News at Sunrise. In 1996 he became the weekend anchor on NBC's Today Show.

In the mid-1990s, Kur gained attention for his coverage of the lawsuits against the tobacco industries. He later became an anchor for MSNBC and was later the White House correspondent.

In 2006, he left MSNBC to work for Washington Post Radio, a new radio station in the Washington, D.C. area.

Kur lives in Newfield, New York. He is married to Cathy Porter and has three children.
