= The Mission (theme music) =

Orchestral suite composed by John Williams

- Theme music by John Williams
- Genre: Orchestral, television theme
- Commissioned by: NBC News
- Published: 1985

Premiere
- Date: September 9, 1985
- Performers: NBC Orchestra
- Used by various NBC News programs including NBC Nightly News, Meet the Press, and Today

"The Mission" is an orchestral suite composed by John Williams in 1985 as a television news music package for NBC News. It consists of four movements: The Mission, used for NBC Nightly News, with variations used for some other NBC programs; Fugue for Changing Times, used for Before Hours during 1987–1988; Scherzo for Today, used for Today until 1990; and The Pulse of Events, used by Meet the Press and special breaking news reports.

== History ==
At the time Williams was approached to write the NBC News suite, he was already well known for his work on Star Wars, Superman, and E.T. the Extra-Terrestrial. NBC engaged Williams due to the network's desire to contrast with the synthesized music common for news programs at the time. Williams stated he wanted to convey the concepts of nobility of purpose, consistency, and dignity. The original recordings were made with an 80-piece orchestra.

== Movements ==
The suite consists of four movements. The original recording included two versions of each movement to open and close each show, and eleven bumpers conveying varying moods.

=== The Mission ===
The first movement is also called The Mission, and has been used for NBC Nightly News since September 9, 1985. It has also been known as The Sound of the News. Its opening features a distinctive syncopated fanfare over a violin line. A reviewer for Slate compared it to the work of Richard Strauss and Aaron Copland, and noted that the piece makes "you feel that you've been asked to join an exciting journey for truth".

The Mission was re-recorded in October 2004 with a 100-piece orchestra conducted by Williams at the Sony Pictures Studios. This recording has a crisper and cleaner sound. The opening theme of The Mission was updated on November 8, 2004, in preparation for Brian Williams succeeding Tom Brokaw as the anchor on Nightly News, and the closing theme of The Mission was updated on March 26, 2007, as the program began broadcasting in high-definition. Another update was made in 2011, containing only subtle changes.

Variations of The Mission have also been used for NBC News at Sunrise prior to 1996, for The Chris Matthews Show, and for Today from 1985 to 2013, when it was replaced with a new piece by Adam Gubman conveying a "more newsy and less cinematic" sound. The theme has also been used on some NBC affiliates for their local newscasts.

Australia's Seven Network adopted the original theme for its news bulletins in 1988. Seven has since updated its version of the theme three times independently from NBC that each have utilized a modernized "hard news" cadence compared to the original theme's strictly orchestral composition. One Seven Network affiliate, TNT (for its Nightly News) in Tasmania, also use the theme for their local news programming. Before 2015, the intro for the news of the Radio Television of Djibouti also used to feature a short part of the Seven Network's theme.

=== Fugue for Changing Times ===
Fugue for Changing Times was used for Before Hours, a 15-minute early morning business news program hosted by Bob Jamieson, which aired between March 1987 and September 1988.

=== Scherzo for Today ===
Scherzo for Today is a short two-minute piece composed for use as the opening theme of NBC's Today. Its mood was intended to be celebratory and flashy. Like most scherzos, it is light and upbeat, and utilizes ternary or "ABA" form. The "A" theme, carried by the strings, is rather jumpy and loud, with the brass serving as a raucous accompaniment, and the "B" theme, the theme of The Today Show, is smoother and more melodic. The new music gave the program a distinctly modern and refined sound.

The music was used until 1990, when it was replaced with a variation on The Mission.

=== The Pulse of Events ===
The Pulse of Events was originally intended for midterm election coverage on November 4, 1986 and was later adopted by Meet the Press in 1989 and breaking news interruptions in 1993. It was meant to convey a worldly and serious tone. Slate characterized the piece as having "fast, complicated modulations that sound more urgent and wary than [The Mission]: They foreground the show's relentless, logical ethos".
