= NBC News at Sunrise =

American news program

- Genre: News program
- Presented by: Connie Chung; Bob Jamieson; Deborah Norville; John Palmer; Faith Daniels; Margaret Larson; Ann Curry; Felicia Taylor; Linda Vester; Brigitte Quinn
- Theme music composer: John Williams
- Opening theme: "The Mission"
- Country of origin: United States
- Original language: English
- No. of seasons: 16

Production
- Production locations: GE Building, 30 Rockefeller Center, New York City, New York
- Camera setup: Multi-camera
- Running time: 30 minutes
- Production company: NBC News Productions

Original release
- Network: NBC
- Release: August 1, 1983 – September 6, 1999

Related
- Early Today (1982–1983, 1999–present)

NBC News at Sunrise is an American early morning television news program that aired on NBC from August 1, 1983 to September 6, 1999. The program featured the top news headlines of the morning, sports and weather reports, and business segments. Many of the program's anchors also appeared on NBC's morning news program Today.

== History ==
NBC News at Sunrise debuted on August 1, 1983, with Connie Chung as its main anchor, Bill Macatee serving as sports anchor and Joe Witte serving as weather anchor. The program replaced Early Today as NBC's early morning news program, that program debuted in July 1982 and was hosted by Today anchors Bryant Gumbel, Jane Pauley and Willard Scott. Viewership for Early Today had been lagging behind those of the two competing early-morning newscasts on ABC and CBS, and at the same time, the flagship Today program had lost viewers. Chung was hired to replace Gumbel and Pauley, who remained on Today. When Sunrise debuted in 1983, the program ran in most markets at 6:30 a.m., because few television stations at the time carried early morning local newscasts.

In the late 1980s, NBC News at Sunrise consisted of six segments during the half-hour broadcast, leading off with a segment of national and international news headlines. The second segment was a summary of the previous day's sports scores and headlines, anchored by a personality from NBC Sports; Bill Macatee, Don Gould, Jimmy Cefalo and Don Criqui were among those who filled this duty. The third segment featured a national weather forecast provided by Witte. A five-minute local news cutaway aired as the fourth segment. Some NBC affiliates filled the slot with a local newscast; Sunrise filled the time with "Another Look," a rerun of a story that ran on the previous edition of NBC Nightly News. In the fifth segment, the anchor gave a recap of the top news headlines and interviewed a business analyst; Alan Abelson of Barron's magazine was a frequent guest.

Before the last commercial break, graphics highlighted the previous day's ten most active stocks on the New York Stock Exchange. In the final segment, Joe Witte offered a second weather forecast. In the summer months, a regular feature was "Sun and Swim," a look at air and water temperatures in U.S. beach communities. In the fall, Witte often did a "Foliage" report. In late fall and winter, Witte provided a "Ski Report," providing information on skiing conditions at various U.S. resorts. Also in the final segment, the Sunrise anchor introduced a Today anchor, usually Bryant Gumbel, who provided a preview of the upcoming Today program. In the 1980s, Sunrise used a different cut of the John Williams-composed NBC News theme "The Mission" than that used on NBC Nightly News.

=== Later years ===
Connie Chung left Sunrise to co-host the NBC News prime time magazine 1986 with Roger Mudd. Bob Jamieson served as interim anchor until January 1987, when he left to host Before Hours, a 15-minute early morning business program produced by NBC News and The Wall Street Journal. Transferring from NBC's Chicago owned-and-operated station WMAQ-TV, Deborah Norville was Sunrise anchor from January 1987 to September 1989, when she departed for Today and John Palmer took over as anchor. Faith Daniels replaced Palmer by 1990.

As stations that added local morning newscasts during the run of the program gradually expanded them to earlier timeslots (often to 5:00 or 5:30 a.m. from their previous 6:00 and 6:30 a.m. timeslots) in the late 1990s, the live broadcast of Sunrise was moved to 5:00 a.m. Eastern Time and was rebroadcast on a tape-delayed loop until 8:00 a.m. Eastern Time, when an updated edition of the program was broadcast for viewers in the Pacific Time Zone.

=== Cancellation ===
On April 14, 1999, NBC announced radical changes to its morning and daytime schedule; NBC News at Sunrise, along with the long-running soap opera Another World, were canceled, while talk show Leeza (which was renewed for the 1999-2000 season) was withdrawn from the network's schedule to make room for Later Today. Sunrise was replaced by a new early morning news program produced by CNBC called Early Today (ironically sharing the same name as the program Sunrise replaced 16 years earlier) – which was initially broadcast a half-hour earlier than Sunrise at the time of its cancellation, at 4:30 a.m. Eastern Time – and focused mainly on business reports than general news headlines (production of Early Today was taken over by MSNBC in 2004, which also resulted in a switch to a general news format). Sunrise aired its final broadcast on September 6, 1999, which was anchored by former MSNBC and Weekend Today correspondent Gulstan Dart (now with Sacramento NBC affiliate KCRA-TV).

== Anchors ==
- Connie Chung (1983–1986)
- Bob Jamieson (1986–1987)
- Deborah Norville (1987–1989)
- John Palmer (1989–1990)
- Faith Daniels (1990–1991)
- Margaret Larson (1991)
- Ann Curry (1991–1997)
- Felicia Taylor (1997)
- Linda Vester (1997–1998)
- Brigitte Quinn (1998–1999)
