= NBC page =

12-month paid fellowship with NBC

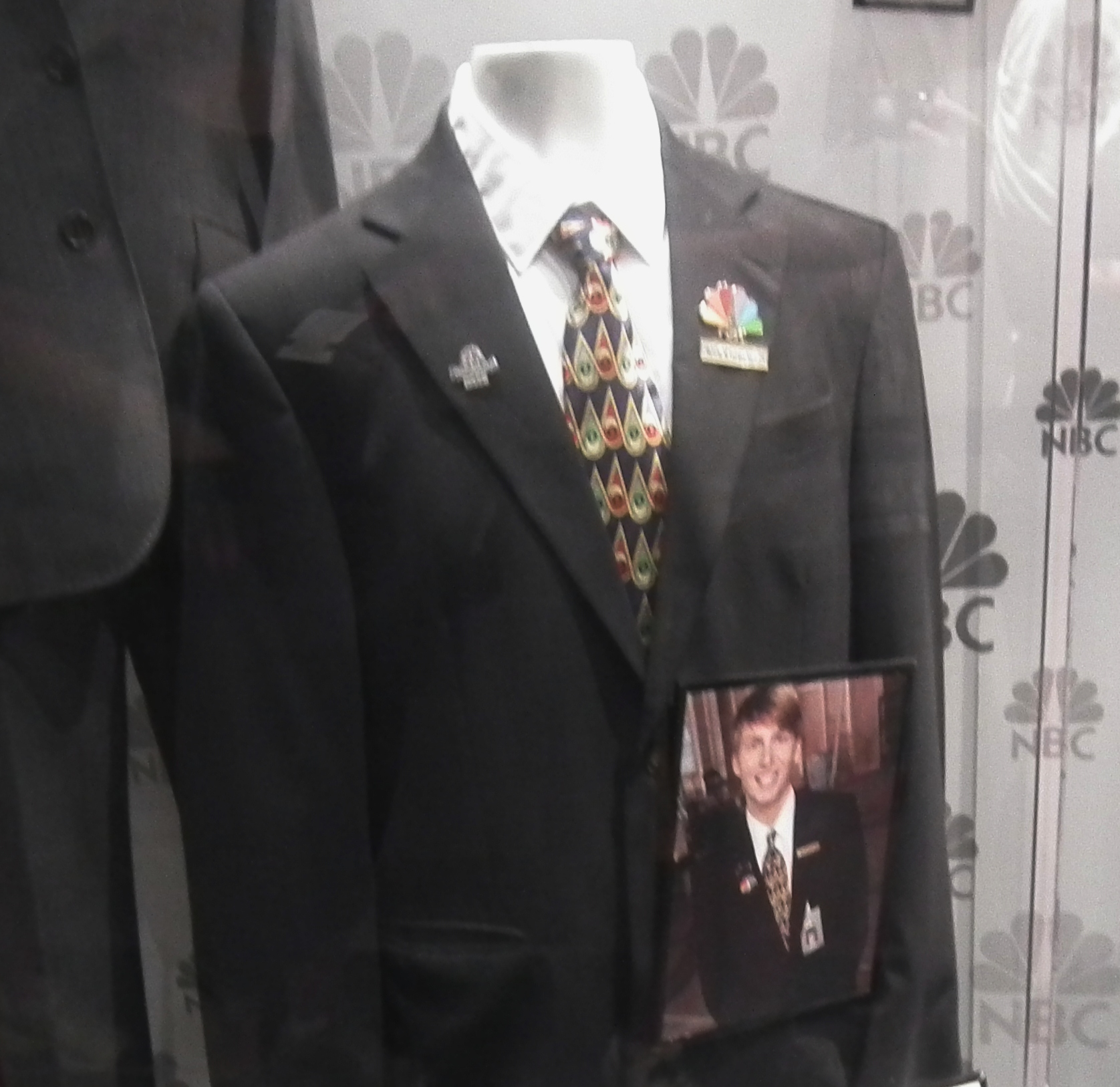
The distinctive NBC page uniform, with a photo of Jack McBrayer, who portrayed NBC page Kenneth Parcell on 30 Rock.

The NBC Page Program also known as the NBCUniversal Page Program is a 12-16 month paid fellowship at the NBCUniversal studios in New York City and Universal City, California. Pages contribute to various teams while on business, consumer, and content assignments. East Coast pages also give tours and work in audience services at NBC Studios in New York City. Notable people who began their careers as NBC pages include Gregory Peck, Eva Marie Saint, Regis Philbin, Michael Eisner, Ted Koppel, Trevor Moore and Aubrey Plaza.

== Background ==
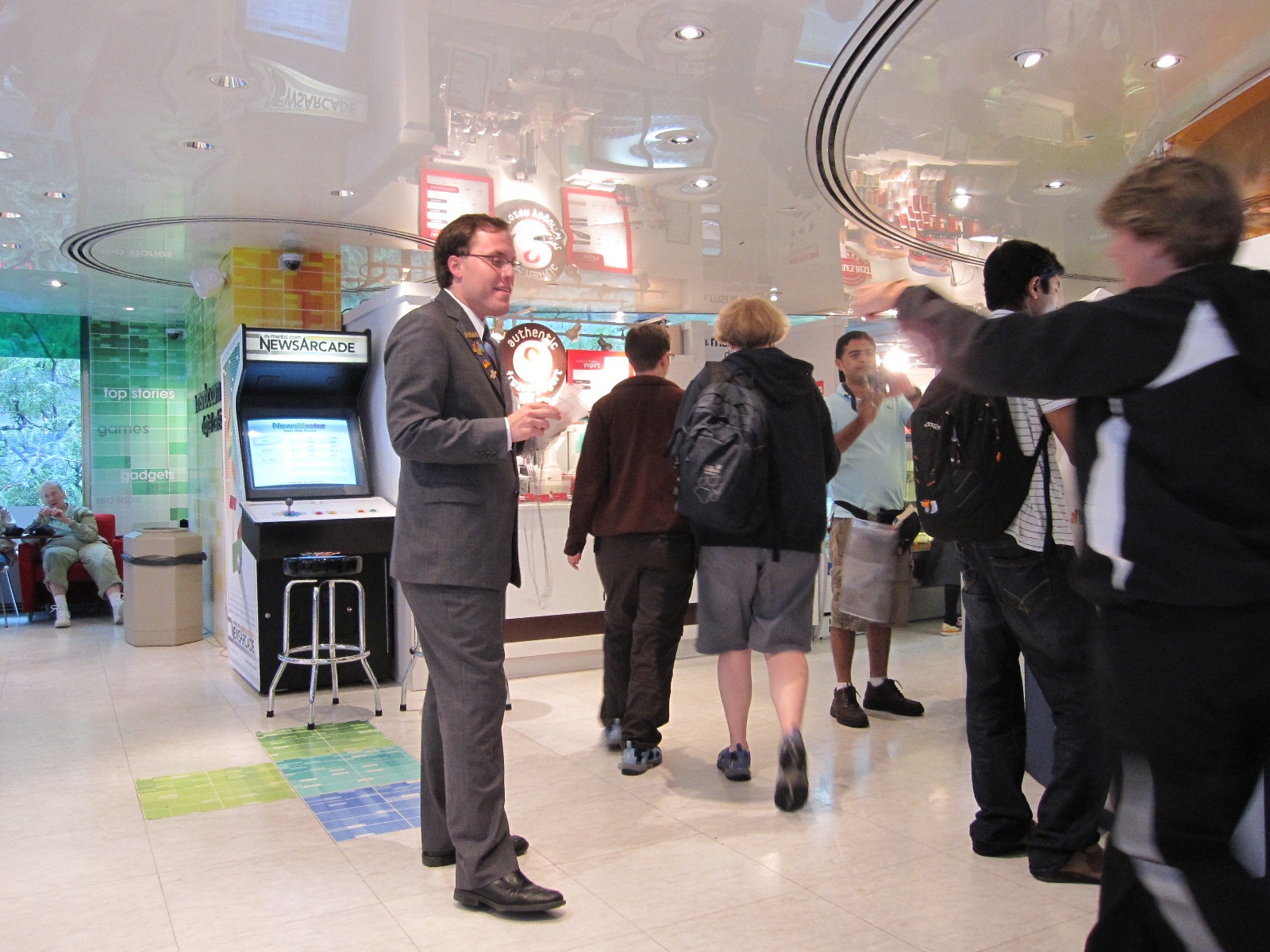
NBC Page giving a tour in 2009 at Rockefeller Center.

NBC began the page program in 1933 at its Rockefeller Center headquarters, later expanding it to the West Coast studios in Universal City. In the 1950s, NBC also offered page positions at their owned-and-operated stations, such as WRC in Washington, D.C. where future Today Show personality Willard Scott was an NBC page.

Selection is highly competitive, with only 212 pages selected a year out of more than 16,000 applicants. With around 1.5 percent of applicants accepted to the program, becoming an NBC page is more competitive than gaining admission to Ivy League universities. Past pages describe the interview process as grueling, as the company seeks the best corporate image to present to the public.

Pages regularly get to work on such programs as The Tonight Show and Saturday Night Live. Pages also rotate through assignments in public relations (PR), marketing, development, TV music services, and production in a variety of shows and special projects. Many pages go on to careers with NBC or other broadcast media, and a number have become celebrities or leaders of the industry in their own right.

== In popular culture ==
In the NBC sitcom 30 Rock, produced by former Saturday Night Live head writer Tina Fey, Jack McBrayer portrays a zealous, smiling, do-good NBC page named Kenneth Parcell, who appears as a page through the show's seven seasons despite pages usually only being employed for a year. And while pages are usually in their 20s, it is a running joke on the show that Kenneth is unrealistically old (indeed, that he is immortal) based on his looks. (For example, in Season 5's "When it Rains, it Pours", Kenneth is seen nostalgically packing away a signed photograph of Fred Allen from 1947, dedicated: "Kenneth, you're the TOPS!" into a box marked "NBC Memories 1945-1967".)

The Team Members of the theme park attraction Race Through New York Starring Jimmy Fallon, at Universal Studios Florida, are dressed as NBC pages as part of the theming of the attraction, which is housed in a replica of 30 Rockefeller Plaza, where NBC Studios are located.

== Notable NBC pages ==
Dave Garroway, former NBC page

Notable former NBC pages include:

- Tex Antoine (1943), weather forecaster
- Chuck Barris, TV producer and personality
- Pierce Brown, science fiction author, Red Rising saga
- Jim Case, television director and producer
- Clay Cole (1957), producer/writer and television host
- Michael Eisner (1963), former CEO of The Walt Disney Company
- Dave Garroway (1938), Today Show host
- Sara Haines (2000), The View co-host, former NBC's Today Show correspondent
- Edd Hall (1979), Tonight Show announcer
- Kate Jackson, actress, Charlie's Angels
- Stu Kerr, television personality
- Ted Koppel (1960), ABC-TV news reporter
- Bill Leyden, game show host
- Trevor Moore (2003), comedian, The Whitest Kids U' Know
- Sona Movsesian, media personality and executive assistant to Conan O'Brien
- Regis Philbin (1955), TV personality, Live with Regis and Kathie Lee, Who Wants to Be a Millionaire
- Aubrey Plaza (2005), actress, Parks & Recreation, Scott Pilgrim vs. the World
- Gene Rayburn, Match Game host
- Joan Rivers, comedian
- Eva Marie Saint (1944), actress, The Trip to Bountiful, On the Waterfront
- Willard Scott (1950), Today Show weather reporter, creator and original performer of Ronald McDonald
- Michael Shure, Current TV host
- Lara Spencer, Good Morning America co-anchor, Nightline and ABC News correspondent
- Trey Wingo, ESPN anchor
- Bruce Willis, actor
- Efrem Zimbalist Jr., actor, 77 Sunset Strip, The F.B.I.

== See also ==
- NBC
- List of NBC personalities
