= NBC Nightly News =

Flagship daily evening television news program for NBC News

- Also known as: NBC Nightly News with Tom Llamas (2025–present)
- Genre: News program
- Created by: Reuven Frank
- Directed by: Christian Alicea; Susan King
- Presented by: Weekdays: Tom Llamas; Saturdays: Jose Diaz-Balart; Sundays: Hallie Jackson
- Narrated by: Bill Hanrahan; Howard Reig; Michael Douglas; Bill Wolff
- Theme music composer: Fred Weinberg Productions (1977); Henry Mancini (1977–1982); Joseph Paul Sicurella, Tony Smythe & Bob Christianson (1982–1985); John Williams (1985–present)
- Opening theme: "The Mission" (1985–present) (for past themes, see section)
- Ending theme: Same as opening
- Composer: John Williams
- Country of origin: United States
- Original language: English
- No. of seasons: 57

Production
- Executive producer: Meghan Rafferty
- Camera setup: Multi-camera
- Running time: 30 minutes
- Production company: NBC News Productions

Original release
- Network: NBC
- Release: August 3, 1970 – present

Related
- Early Today; Today; NBC News Daily; Competitors: CBS Evening News; ABC World News Tonight; PBS News Hour

NBC Nightly News (titled as NBC Nightly News with Tom Llamas for its weeknight broadcasts since June 2, 2025) is the flagship daily evening television news program for NBC News, the news division of the NBC television network in the United States. First aired on August 3, 1970, the program is currently the second most-watched network newscast in the United States, behind ABC's World News Tonight. NBC Nightly News is produced from Studio 3A at NBC Studios at 30 Rockefeller Center in New York City. Selected Los Angeles–based editions broadcast from The Brokaw News Center in Universal City, California, or when broadcasting from Washington, D.C., either from the NBC News bureau based at WRC-TV in the Tenleytown neighborhood, or NBC's secondary studio overlooking Capitol Hill.

As of June 2, 2025, the broadcast is anchored by Tom Llamas on weeknights, José Díaz-Balart on Saturday since 2016 and Hallie Jackson on Sunday since 2024. Previous anchors include John Chancellor, David Brinkley, Tom Brokaw, Brian Williams, and Lester Holt.

The program is broadcast live over most NBC stations from 6:30 p.m. to 7:00 p.m. Eastern Time seven days a week; the "Western Edition" of the program occasionally features breaking news and/or updated information on news stories covered during the original telecast for Pacific Time Zone viewers, and some stations in that time zone carry it live at 3:30 p.m. PT to lead into their late afternoon local news blocks. Its current theme music, "The Mission", debuted in 1985 and was composed by John Williams.

== History ==
=== John Chancellor and David Brinkley (1970–1982) ===
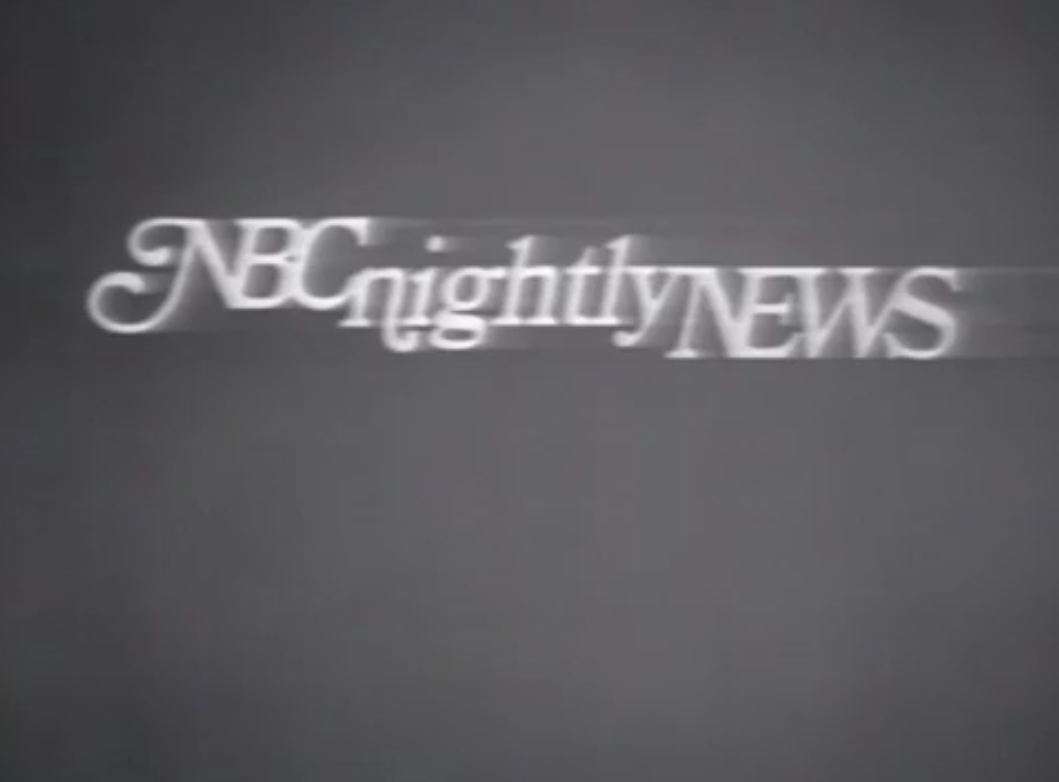
Original title card, used from 1970 to 1972

NBC Nightly News title card, used from 1972 to 1975

NBC Nightly News replaced The Huntley–Brinkley Report on August 3, 1970, upon Chet Huntley's retirement. At first, David Brinkley, John Chancellor, and Frank McGee rotated duties as anchors. At least one, usually two, and very rarely all three anchored the program on a given night. Except for the few nights when one of the men solo anchored, each evening's program included one anchor based in New York City at the Rockefeller Center and one in Washington, D.C., as had been the case on the Huntley-Brinkley Report. Brinkley's appearances were always from Washington and McGee's were always from New York. Chancellor moved between those two cities depending on his partner for the evening.

In addition to Brinkley as a holdover from the Huntley-Brinkley Report, McGee had received praise for his anchoring or co-anchoring of space flights, and Chancellor had also received praise as McGee's co-anchor for the space missions of Apollo 12 and Apollo 13.

Brinkley provided commentary several times per week in the 1970s

With network executives perceiving the instability of this arrangement as a factor in Nightly News losing audience share to the CBS Evening News, NBC discontinued the rotation arrangement, and McGee eventually replaced Hugh Downs as host of Today. Chancellor became the sole anchor of the program on August 9, 1971, with Brinkley providing a three-minute commentary segment, "David Brinkley's Journal", from Washington several times a week.

On June 7, 1976, Brinkley returned to the anchor desk and tried the dual-anchor approach once again. Initially, Chancellor and Brinkley both reported from New York City, however Brinkley would later return to Washington. Chancellor again became sole anchor of Nightly News on October 10, 1979, with Brinkley once again providing commentaries until he left NBC for ABC News in 1981, where he became host of that network's new Sunday morning interview show This Week.

Despite the various changes, Chancellor was never able to break the grip that Walter Cronkite and the CBS Evening News had on the American news viewer, although Nightly News was sometimes a strong second place in the evening news ratings for most of the 1970s. After resigning from the anchor desk on April 2, 1982, Chancellor remained on the program as an editorial commentator until his retirement in 1993.

=== Tom Brokaw (1982–2004) ===
On April 5, 1982, Tom Brokaw, who had been serving as anchor of Today since 1976, joined the program and took over co-anchor duties in New York City, while Roger Mudd became anchor in Washington. Mudd was removed from the broadcast and Brokaw became the solo anchor of Nightly News on September 5, 1983, the same day that his ABC competitor, Peter Jennings, became sole anchor of World News Tonight. With Brokaw being the sole anchor, the Nightly News was now completely based in New York City. Among other news items, he covered the Space Shuttle Challenger disaster, EDSA Revolution, Loma Prieta earthquake, the fall of the Berlin Wall, and Hurricane Andrew. As anchor, Brokaw conducted the first one-on-one American television interviews with Soviet leader Mikhail Gorbachev and Russian President Vladimir Putin. He was the only network anchor in Berlin when the Berlin Wall fell. Brokaw's presence slowly attracted viewers, and during the 1990s, Nightly News battled for the viewership lead with World News Tonight. He and Katie Couric hosted a prime-time newsmagazine, Now with Tom Brokaw and Katie Couric, that aired from 1993 to 1994 before being folded into the multi-night Dateline NBC program. By 1997, NBC Nightly News had solidified its first place standing in the ratings, a spot it would retain solely for ten years. The once-dominant CBS Evening News, anchored by Dan Rather, had lost a substantial portion of the audience it held during the Walter Cronkite era and slid to third place (where it still remains as of 2017) in the viewership wars.

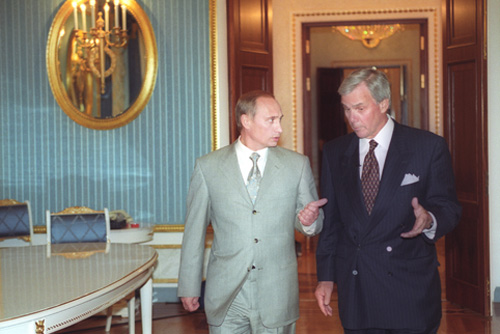
Brokaw with Vladimir Putin before an interview on June 2, 2000

On September 11, 2001, Brokaw joined Katie Couric and Matt Lauer at 9:48 a.m., following the attack on The Pentagon, and continued to anchor all day, until after midnight. Following the collapse of the second tower, Brokaw said:

This is war. This is a declaration and an execution of an attack on the United States.

On May 28, 2002, Brokaw announced his retirement as anchor of Nightly News, to take effect shortly after the Presidential election in 2004. During this last time helming the network's presidential election coverage, NBC graphic designers created images of a giant electoral map on the ice rink at Rockefeller Plaza, and cherry pickers tallied the electoral vote count on the façade of 30 Rockefeller Plaza (this tradition has continued with each election since then). Brokaw's final broadcast took place on December 1, 2004, ending 22 years on the Nightly News desk and a 21-year run as the network's chief newsman, a record tenure in NBC's history.

=== Brian Williams (2004–2015) ===
Brian Williams, a frequent substitute for Brokaw for NBC Nightly News, succeeded him as the program's permanent anchor on December 2, 2004. The program held onto the #1 ratings spot among the network evening newscasts from Williams' first day, averaging about 10 million viewers each week until February 2007, when it traded places with its closest competitor World News with Charles Gibson. However, NBC Nightly News regained the lead a few months later; it has now been America's most-watched evening newscast for over a decade.

Williams rose to new levels of popularity for his live spot reporting during and after the 2005 hurricane season. With the transition to Williams, the show recognized its past in its opening seconds, with small photos of former anchors and sets and the voices of John Cameron Swayze, Huntley, Brinkley, Chancellor, and Brokaw, as well as an orchestral version of the "G-E-C" NBC Chimes serving as an intro bumper, before going into the opening headlines summary read by Williams; this opening sequence was discontinued on September 17, 2007, except for weekends and nights with substitute anchors until October 2007. On December 4, 2006, Nightly News was presented with "limited commercial interruptions" through a sponsorship arrangement with Philips, marking the first time in its 36-year history that the newscast experimented with reduced advertising.

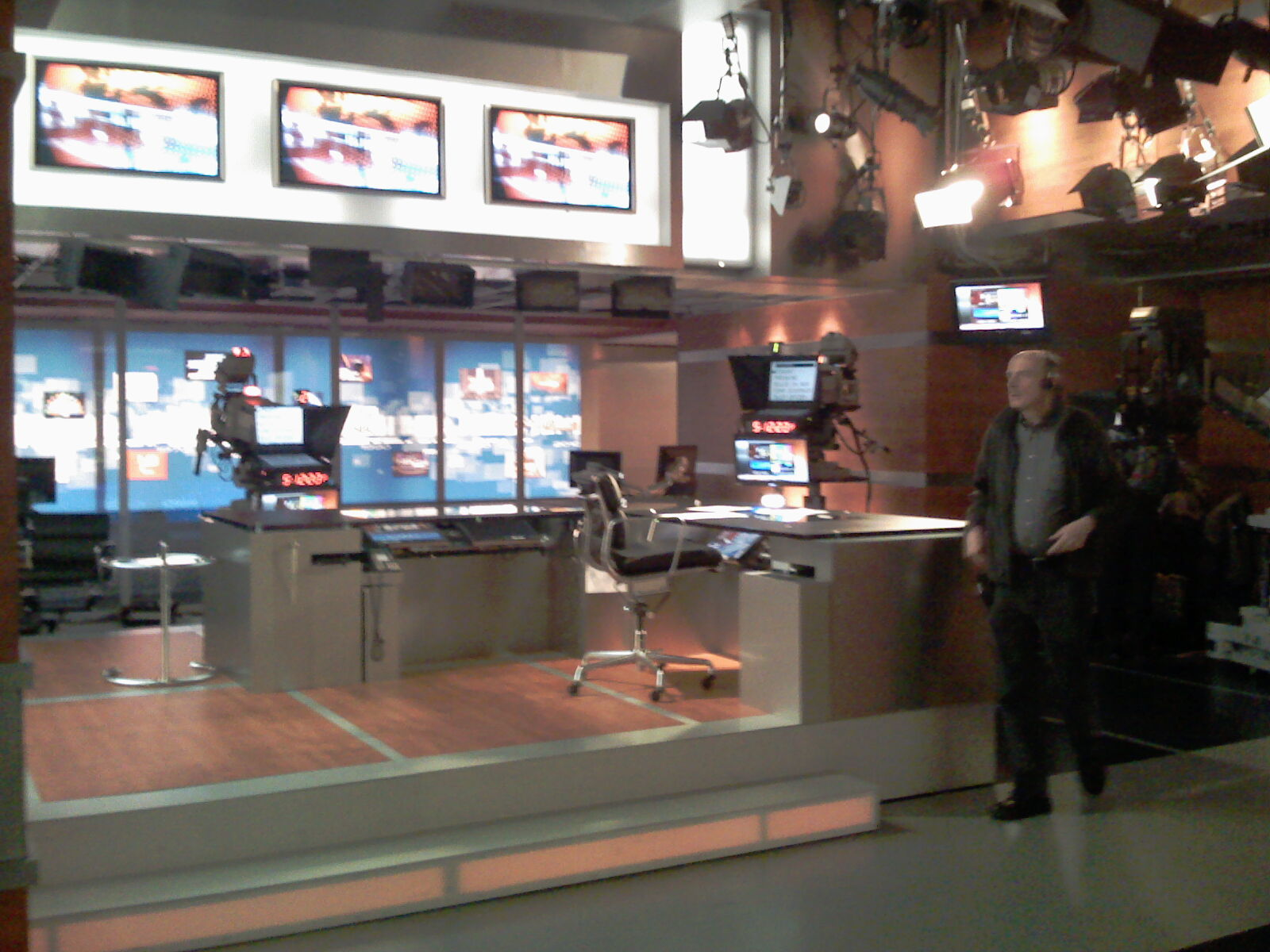
Former set of NBC Nightly News, pictured in 2008

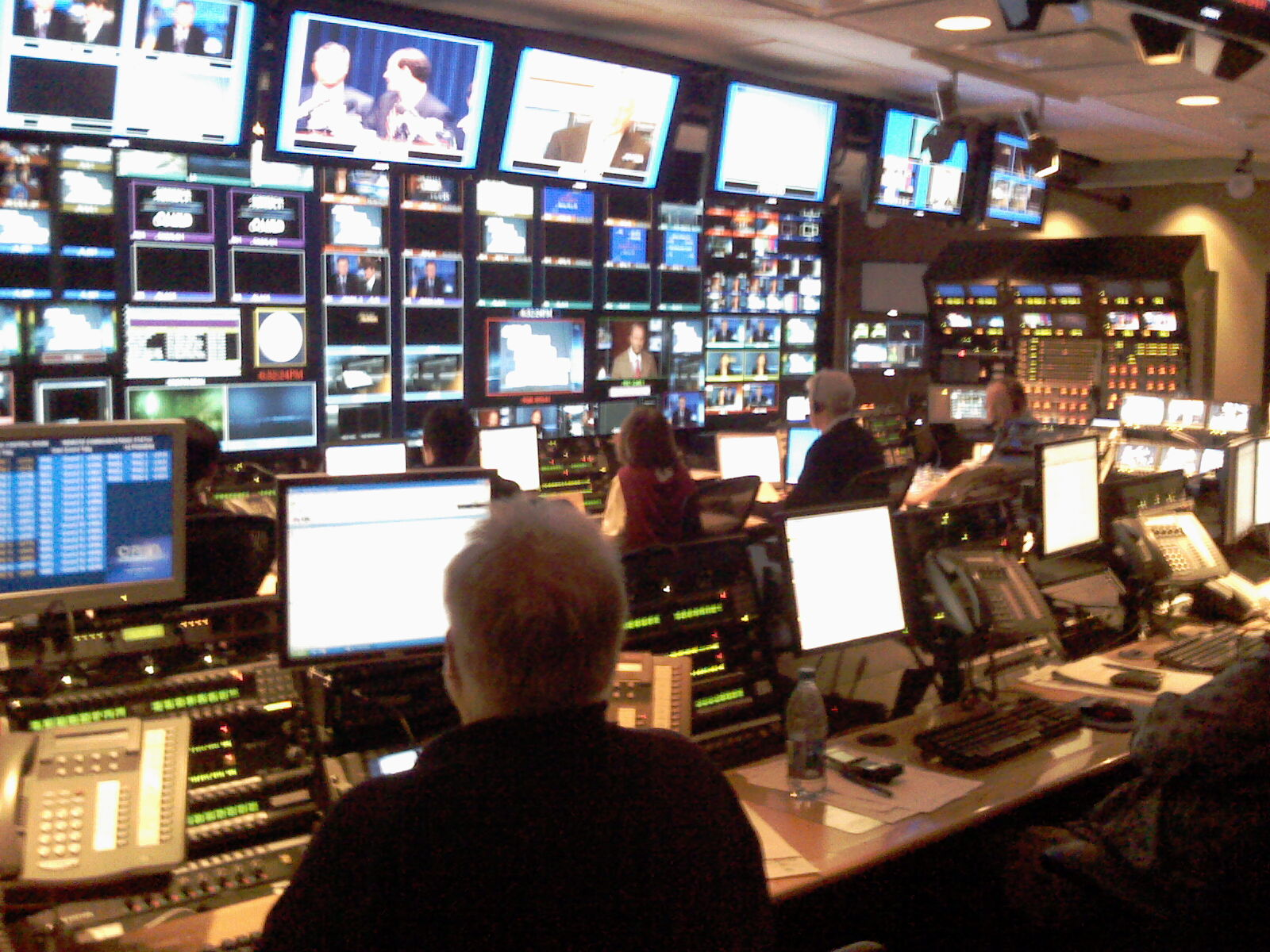
NBC Nightly News control room

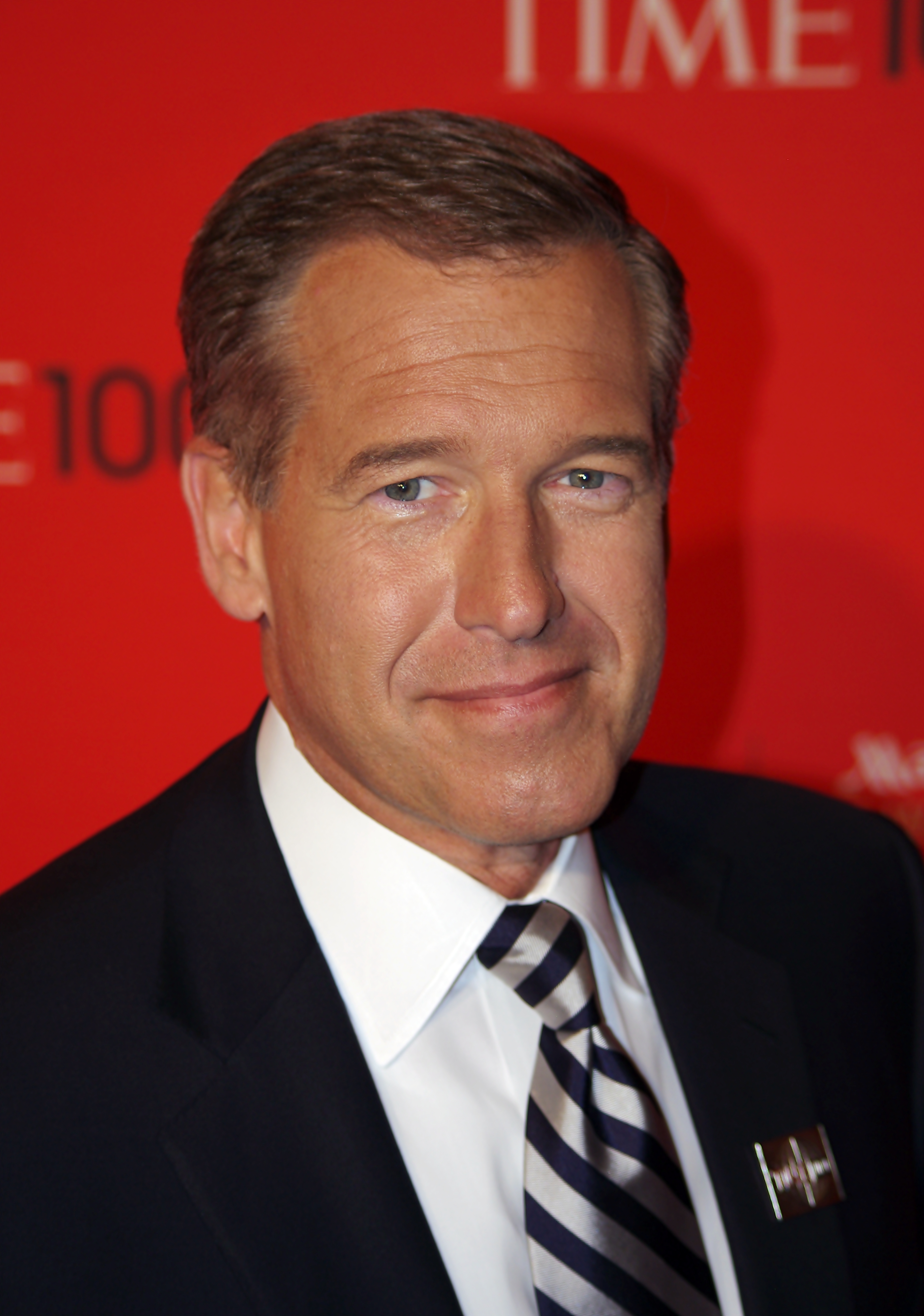
Williams in 2011

During Williams' tenure as main anchor of the program, Lester Holt and Kate Snow often substituted while he was on vacation or on assignment; other substitute anchors included Katie Couric, Matt Lauer, Savannah Guthrie, Tamron Hall, Harry Smith, Jenna Wolfe, Erica Hill, Hoda Kotb, Natalie Morales and Carl Quintanilla, as well as now-former NBC anchors Ann Curry, Campbell Brown, David Gregory, Amy Robach, Peter Alexander, and John Seigenthaler.

NBC Nightly News began broadcasting in high definition on March 26, 2007, becoming the first of the three network evening news programs to make the transition (the CBS Evening News began broadcasting in HD on January 7, 2008; ABC World News Tonight began broadcasting in HD on August 25, 2008, during its coverage of the 2008 Democratic National Convention). Most news video from on-remote locations continued to be shot in standard definition at the time, while the network's news bureaus underwent a conversion to HD, which was completed in 2009.

The Nightly News set in Studio 3C, which had been in use since January 27, 1992, was retired on May 4, 2007. The broadcast temporarily relocated to Studio 8G on the same set as of May 8, 2007, used for the studio segments seen during the network's Sunday Night Football broadcasts and its pregame show, and where NBC's 2006 Congressional election coverage originated. After months of construction, Studio 3C was re-opened on October 22, 2007, with the introduction of a new set for Nightly News; sister cable network MSNBC's new set in Studio 3A was also inaugurated at that time. On October 24, 2011, the broadcast moved to Studio 3B, which also served as the homebase of Williams' short-lived newsmagazine for NBC, Rock Center.

==== Embellishment scandal/suspension and replacement ====
On February 4, 2015, Williams apologized on the program for having "conflated" on numerous occasions an account that he had been aboard a Chinook helicopter shot down by enemy fire from a rocket-propelled grenade while covering the Invasion of Iraq in 2003, when he was in fact aboard a helicopter that followed behind it. This came after he received criticism by U.S. soldiers for embellishing the story when a segment from the January 30, 2015, broadcast recounting the incident was posted on the program's Facebook page. The revelation spurred negative press towards Williams, including some asking for him to be fired by NBC News, although Paul Rieckhoff, founder of Iraq and Afghanistan Veterans of America, stated that "persecuting [Williams] over this mistake will do little to help our veterans and service members".

Amid that controversy and questions over Williams' claims that made regarding his experiences while reporting from New Orleans on the aftermath of Hurricane Katrina in August 2005, including that he contracted dysentery from accidentally ingesting flood water, the news division decided to launch an internal investigation into the matter that would be conducted through its investigative unit. On February 7, 2015, Williams stated in a memo to NBC News staff that he would take himself "off the daily broadcast for the next several days," with Lester Holt substituting for him on the weeknight broadcasts.

On February 10, 2015, Williams was suspended without pay for six months due to the scandal which arose after he came under fire for fabricating a story about his reporting on the Iraq War and Hurricane Katrina. Williams claimed to have been reporting in Iraq in 2002 when the helicopter he was traveling on was hit by an RPG and he was forced to land. He had told the story several times, including his appearances on the Late Show with David Letterman and on Nightly News itself only a few nights before several war veterans who had been with Williams in 2002 claimed that Williams had not been present at the time of the crash, but showed up about an hour later to report on it. Williams issued an apology, saying he had "misremembered" the story in his head and it had been a genuine accident, but many critics accused Williams of fabricating the story and called for his resignation. Williams later announced that he would be taking some time off because he had become "too much a part of the news." NBC announced that weekend anchor Lester Holt would anchor the program in the interim.

=== Lester Holt (2015–2025) ===
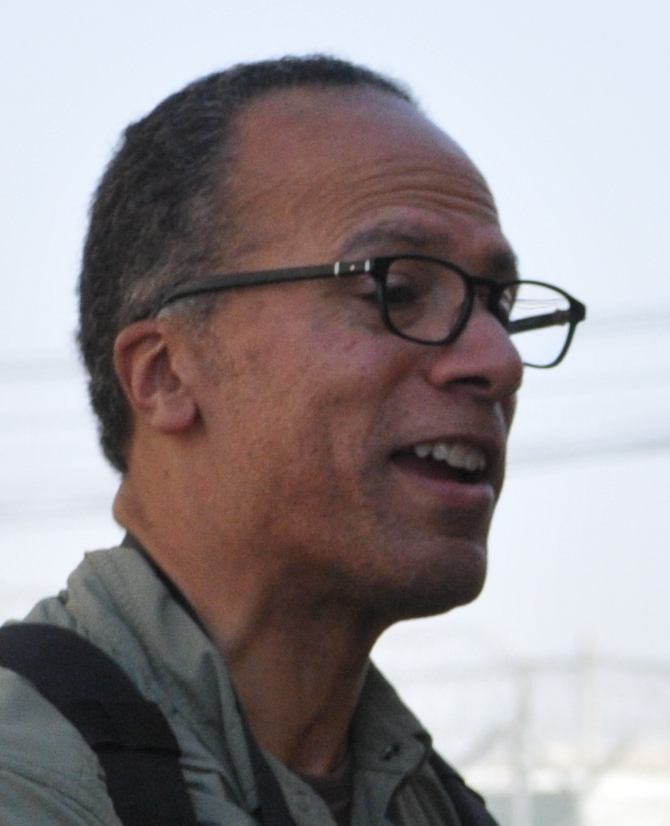
Lester Holt (pictured in 2012), anchor of NBC Nightly News from 2015 to 2025

On June 18, 2015, NBC News and MSNBC chairman Andrew Lack announced that Lester Holt would become the main anchor of NBC Nightly News on a permanent basis effective on June 22, 2015, Holt was on a scheduled vacation on the day of the announcement, with Today presenter Savannah Guthrie serving as interim anchor of the broadcast that week. After his suspension ended in August, Brian Williams was reassigned to MSNBC where he previously served as both an anchor and correspondent.

Holt previously served as interim anchor of the weeknight broadcasts from August 6, 2013, to September 2, 2013, when Williams went on medical leave from NBC News in order to undergo knee replacement surgery. With his promotion to main anchor, Holt is the first African-American solo weeknight anchor of a major network newscast. Max Robinson was co-anchor of ABC's World News Tonight from 1978 to 1983, and Gwen Ifill was a co-anchor of the PBS NewsHour from 2013 until her death in 2016.

On June 27, 2016, NBC Nightly News switched to a full 16:9 letterbox presentation, with the existing graphics package being re-positioned for the 16:9 format. On October 10, 2016, the newscast debuted an entirely new on-air look with graphics originally optimized for the full 16:9 presentation, including a new program logo replacing variations of the previous one that had been used since November 8, 1999.

On July 14, 2017, NBC Nightly News permanently moved back from Studio 3B to Studio 3C.

In 2018, NBC Nightly News launched an ongoing series of specials, NBC Nightly Films.

On August 11, 2021, it was announced that executive producer Jennifer Suozzo would be departing the program and Meghan Rafferty would be interim executive producer on August 16, 2021.

On September 13, 2021, NBC Nightly News permanently moved from Studio 3C to Studio 1A, also the home of Today.

Logo symbol

Nameless vertical logo

Current NBC Nightly News logos, first introduced on June 19, 2023

On June 19, 2023, NBC Nightly News underwent its first large-scale rebrand since the Brian Williams era as part of a wider rebranding of NBC as a whole; it was unveiled by NBC during an event honoring of 75 years of televised newscasts on NBC. The rebrand includes a new on-air graphics scheme intended to create fewer distractions from the content of stories, as well as a new stylized "N" emblem (reminiscent of the network's 1979–86 "Proud N" logo) that can be split apart to display headlines, and is better-suited for digital platforms.

On February 24, 2025, NBC News announced Holt would be resigning from NBC Nightly News to focus more on Dateline NBC. NBC did not immediately name a successor, but media outlets speculated Top Story anchor Tom Llamas and weekend anchors José Díaz-Balart and Hallie Jackson as potential candidates.

Holt's final broadcast as anchor of NBC Nightly News aired on May 30, 2025. Holt also appeared on Today earlier that day to discuss his legacy and his desire to pursue long-form journalism. At the end of the broadcast, Holt signed off saying:

As anchor, it has been an honor to lead this program and an honor to be welcomed into your homes. I'm so grateful for your trust. Around here, facts matter, words matter, journalism matters and you matter. [ ... ] I'll miss our evenings together, and I will miss the team that puts it all together, my dear friends and my colleagues. But for now, I just want to say thank you to my incredibly supportive and patient family, and all of you. [ ... ] In the meantime, please continue to take care of yourself and each other, and I’ll do the same. [ ... ] It has been quite a ride. Thanks everybody.

=== Tom Llamas (2025–present) ===
On March 5, 2025, NBC News announced Tom Llamas as Holt's successor. Llamas previously anchored ABC's rival newscast World News Tonight on weekends before returning to NBC News in 2021 (Llamas was previously working with NBC from 2000 to 2014). Llamas also continues to anchor Top Story with Tom Llamas on NBC News Now. NBC began running its promotional campaign for Llamas on May 19, 2025. Llamas debuted as anchor and managing editor of NBC Nightly News on June 2, 2025.

In April 2026, NBC News announced that the Nightly News and NBC News Now would relocate to Studio 3A, which had been vacated by MSNBC in November 2025 during its rebranding as MS NOW; NBC Nightly News and Top Story began airing from the studio on May 18, 2026, utilizing MSNBC's former set.

== Alternate editions ==
=== Weekend editions ===
NBC Nightly News
- Genre: Weekend news show
- Presented by: Jose Diaz-Balart; Hallie Jackson
- Country of origin: United States
- Original language: English

Production
- Production location: New York City
- Camera setup: Multi-camera
- Running time: 30 minutes

Original release
- Network: NBC
- Release: 1961 – present

NBC first offered a Saturday evening newscast in 1961, with Sander Vanocur anchoring the NBC Saturday Night Report. Four years later, NBC correspondents Ray Scherer and Robert MacNeil were partnered at the anchor desk on The Scherer-MacNeil Report on Saturdays, continuing until 1967. At that time, the network replaced it with a second weekend airing of The Frank McGee Report, which had been airing on Sundays for several years by that point. The Saturday edition of the Report ran for about a year and a half.

On January 4, 1969, the Huntley-Brinkley Report was expanded to Saturday evenings, with the main anchors working solo on alternating weeks. When lower-than-expected ratings occurred, the network pulled the pair off Saturdays and assigned others such as McGee and Vanocur to anchor the broadcast. On August 2, 1970, two days after the weekday Huntley-Brinkley broadcast ended, the network expanded its evening newscast to Sundays, which also replaced the Sunday broadcast of The Frank McGee Report. For the first year after the Sunday broadcast began, Chancellor, Brinkley and McGee rotated on the program as they did on weeknights; there were no separate weekend anchors. The Saturday and Sunday broadcasts were respectively titled NBC Saturday Night News and NBC Sunday Night News until sometime in the 1970s, when they adopted the NBC Nightly News name.

When Chancellor became sole anchor of the weeknight editions in August 1971, separate anchors were named for the weekend editions.

The weekend editions may occasionally be abbreviated or preempted due to NBC Sports telecasts that overrun into the program's time slot. Since 2006, During the NFL season, the Sunday editions air live in every time zone at 6:30 p.m. Eastern time, immediately prior to Football Night in America and Sunday Night Football, and beginning in 2026, the Sunday editions will continue to air live on every Sunday at 6:30 p.m. Eastern time due to the expansion of its Sunday night sports lineup (which includes Sunday Night Basketball and Sunday Night Baseball).

=== Kids edition ===
In April 2020, NBC News began producing a version of NBC Nightly News targeted at children ages 6 to 16, featuring stories aimed at children. This edition is hosted by Lester Holt (later Tom Llamas) and new episodes premiere every Thursday on NBC News' YouTube channel. Beginning on October 31, 2020, occasional editions of NBC Nightly News: Kids Edition have aired on Saturdays on NBC.

== Personnel ==
=== Weekday anchors ===
The following are people who have been the principal news anchors for the NBC television network's flagship weekday evening-news program, titled since 1970 as NBC Nightly News, as well as its predecessor programs.

- John Cameron Swayze – February 16, 1948 – October 26, 1956 (Camel News Caravan)
- Chet Huntley and David Brinkley – October 29, 1956 – July 31, 1970 (Huntley-Brinkley Report) (Note: Both anchored six days a week during early 1969.)
- John Chancellor, Frank McGee and David Brinkley – August 3, 1970 – August 13, 1971 (Note: Chancellor, McGee, and Brinkley rotated seven days a week.)
- John Chancellor – August 16, 1971 – June 4, 1976; October 10, 1979 – April 2, 1982
- John Chancellor and David Brinkley – June 7, 1976 – October 9, 1979
- Tom Brokaw and Roger Mudd – April 5, 1982 – September 2, 1983
- Tom Brokaw – September 5, 1983 – December 1, 2004
- Brian Williams – December 2, 2004 – February 6, 2015
- Lester Holt – June 22, 2015 – May 30, 2025
- Tom Llamas – June 2, 2025 – present

=== Weekend anchors ===
- Garrick Utley (weekends, 1971–1973 and 1990–1993, Sundays, 1987–1990)
- Tom Brokaw (Saturdays, 1973–1976, Sundays, 1976)
- Floyd Kalber (Sundays, 1973–1975)
- Tom Snyder (Sundays, 1975–1976)
- Cassie Mackin (Sundays, 1976–1977)
- John Hart (Saturdays, 1976–1977, Sundays, 1977–1982)
- Jessica Savitch (Saturdays, some Sundays, 1977–1983)
- Jane Pauley (Sundays, some Saturdays, 1980–1983)
- Connie Chung (Saturdays, 1983–1989)
- Chris Wallace (Sundays, 1982–1984, 1986–1987)
- John Palmer or Bob Jamieson (Sundays, 1984–1986, 1996)
- Maria Shriver (Saturdays, 1989, Sundays, 1990)
- Brian Williams (Saturdays, some Sundays, 1993–1999)
- Ann Curry, Deborah Roberts, Elizabeth Vargas, Jackie Nespral, Scott Simon, Mary Alice Williams, Mike Schneider (Sundays, 1993–1995)
- Giselle Fernández (Sundays, 1995–1996)
- Bob Kur, Chris Hansen, Chris Jansing, Chuck Scarborough, David Bloom, Jack Ford, Jodi Applegate, Len Cannon, Maria Shriver, Maurice DuBois, Ann Curry, Dawn Fratangelo, Hoda Kotb, Kelly O'Donnell, Deborah Norville, Faith Daniels, Jane Pauley, Katie Couric, Matt Lauer, Sara James, Fredricka Whitfield, Soledad O'Brien (Sundays, 1996–1999)
- John Seigenthaler (Sundays, 1996–1999, weekends, 1999–2007)
- Campbell Brown (2007)
- Lester Holt (weekends, 2007–2015)
- Kate Snow (Saturdays, fill-in anchor, June 20, 2020 – February 24, 2024, Sundays, October 4, 2015 – February 25, 2024)
- José Díaz-Balart (Saturdays, August 2016–present)
- Hallie Jackson (Sundays, April 7, 2024–present)

=== Announcer ===
Bill Hanrahan handled the announcing duties for the newscast until his retirement in 1983, as he had done for the predecessor Huntley-Brinkley Report. The next announcer for the program was long-time NBC staff announcer Howard Reig. He retired to Florida in 2005, but a recording he had made before his retirement was used on the program until December 14, 2007. When the show was broadcast on remote or a new substitute anchor was used, Reig recorded a new introduction in a Miami studio. Since Holt took over as anchor, the weekend editions have been voiced by Bill Wolff, who had also worked occasionally on special weekday editions when Reig was unavailable. On December 17, 2007, the weeknight broadcast introduced an opening by Academy Award winning actor/producer Michael Douglas until it was discontinued on June 18, 2015, and was replaced by Wolff.

== Notable incidents ==
The failure of journalists, including with the NBC Nightly News, to check atrocity stories helped convince the US public to support the US-led invasion of Iraq in 1990-1991. One part of this was the Nayirah testimony, in which a 15-year-old Kuwaiti girl who was publicly identified only as Nayirah at the time testified before the US Congressional Human Rights Caucus that she had been a volunteer nurse at a Kuwaiti hospital at the time of the Iraqi invasion of Kuwait and witnessed Iraqi soldiers taking premature babies out of incubators in a maternity ward. It was later reported that she was the daughter of the Kuwaiti ambassador to the US, Saud Nasser Al-Saud Al-Sabah, and a public relations firm had coached her rehearsing her perjury.

On April 18, 2007, NBC News received a package containing a "multimedia manifesto" from Seung-Hui Cho, the gunman responsible for the Virginia Tech shooting that occurred two days earlier. Upon the package's discovery, NBC News handed the package over to federal authorities. The specific details of the package contained a DVD disc of Cho reading from a typed manifesto, as well as more than 40 pictures of Cho brandishing weapons, including the two handguns believed to have been used in the massacre. Some of the package's contents were shown, albeit copied from the originals and edited for profanity, on the April 18, 2007, edition of NBC Nightly News, with anchor Brian Williams and NBC chief justice correspondent Pete Williams examining the package's contents in the opening moments of the broadcast.

On November 29, 2011, a fire alarm went off in the studio a few seconds into the Nightly News Eastern Time Zone broadcast. Despite the false alarm, Brian Williams continued to anchor throughout the entire broadcast. Once the alarm had been turned off, Williams redid the broadcast for the Mountain and Pacific Time Zones, and other selected stations. Brian Williams apologized to east coast viewers at the conclusion of the following night's broadcast, and NBC News apologized for the incident on the program's Twitter account:

What timing... Fire alarm here at 30 Rock goes off at the exact same time we go on air. All is fine in the building & the show goes on. #NN

== International broadcast ==
=== Ongoing ===
==== Canada ====
NBC's Seattle, Spokane, Detroit, Buffalo, Minneapolis, Boston, Plattsburgh and Bangor affiliates are separately available through most Canadian cable companies. Because of their markets' proximity to the Canadian border, NBC affiliates WDIV, WGRZ, and WPBN (through WGTQ's HD2 channel) air live broadcasts of NBC Nightly News without cable.

==== Caribbean ====
The Antillean, Cayman, and some of the Leeward islands air live episodes of NBC Nightly News through Miami-based NBC affiliate WTVJ, which is carried by cable provider FLOW TV as part of their lineup.

==== Europe/MENA ====
Until April 2025 NBC Nightly News was broadcast live on CNBC Europe at 12:30 AM CET (11:30 PM GMT and 10:30 PM during DST respectively), although the Sunday edition of the programme was not shown due to the channel broadcasting live business programming on Sundays at that time of day. The simulcast was replaced by business programming.

It also airs on the 24-hour news network OSN News in MENA Region, with the weekday editions airing immediately after their original telecast in the U.S. and the weekend edition being simulcast live.

In Great Britain in 2022 and 2023, NBC News Now was available on Sky and Virgin Media as a linear channel, resulting in NBC Nightly News's broadcasts on the channel being seen in the UK, both as a live broadcast and as a replay.

==== Hong Kong ====
In Hong Kong, the program is broadcast live (or delayed) on TVB Pearl daily at 7:30 AM Hong Kong Time (corresponding to 18:30, or 6:30 PM, in the Eastern Time Zone of the U.S.).

Its broadcast will be discontinued from 1 June 2026.

==== Philippines ====
In the Philippines, NBC Nightly News returned on Philippine cable and satellite TV starting January 1, 2021, broadcast live daily at 7:30 AM (or 6:30 AM during daylight saving time in the US) on TAP Edge. Starting October 26, 2021, broadcasts of the program were moved to sister channel TAP TV (However, the program will be pre-empted on the other days to give way for the live coverage of ISU Figure Skating Championships events).

==== US Armed Forces ====
NBC Nightly News is broadcast on AFN|news, a channel that is available to several American military bases and ships around the world through the American Forces Network.

=== Discontinued ===
==== Philippines ====
In the Philippines, NBC Nightly News was aired Mondays through Fridays at 8:30 AM (after Daybreak), Saturdays at 9:00 AM and Sundays at 10:00 AM local time; it is also rebroadcast at 5:30 PM each weeknight, 1:30 PM on Saturdays, 4:30 AM on Tuesdays to Saturdays, 10:00 PM on Sundays and daily at 1:30 AM local time on 9TV (formerly as Talk TV and Solar News Channel). The newscast was discontinued in February 2015 as a part of transitory preparations as 9TV eventually re-branded to CNN Philippines on March 16, 2015.

==== Bermuda ====
The East Coast feed of the program was broadcast in Bermuda on local NBC affiliate VSB-TV in the British Overseas Territory; the station ceased broadcasting on August 31, 2014. Access to the programme in the Bahamas remains through cable feeds of WNBC/New York or WTVJ/Miami.

== Video-on-demand ==
NBC Nightly News is also available worldwide as an audio podcast, and can be streamed on demand from the NBC News website the night of its original broadcast after 9:00 p.m. Eastern Time. Beginning with the March 27, 2018, broadcast, Nightly News broadcasts have also started appearing on NBC News's YouTube channel. On January 25, 2015, NBC began indicating that the video podcast of the program would be discontinued and refers users to the news division's website or mobile apps to view editions of Nightly News on mobile devices, although such apps are not compatible with devices that feature podcast support such as early generation Apple TV or Roku devices (current-gen devices offer access to an NBC News app with newscast replays). The video podcast was discontinued on February 14, 2015.

== See also ==
- CNBC
