= Mike Schneider (news anchor) =

American television reporter, personality and anchor

Mike Schneider is an American television news anchor and producer. He has held leading anchor and reporting positions at CBS, ABC, NBC, Fox, PBS and Bloomberg Television.

== Career ==
Schneider was born on Long Island, New York, moved to suburban Philadelphia during his high school years, and was educated at Temple University. He began his TV career in 1975 as a news writer for WPVI-TV in Philadelphia. From August 1975 to January 1976 Mike worked as the sports anchor then from January to September 1976 as weekend news anchor at WTAJ-TV Television in Altoona, Pennsylvania, followed by a similar post at WKBW-TV in Buffalo, New York during the fall of 1976. From 1977 to 1982 he worked as a reporter/anchor for WTAE-TV in Pittsburgh, documenting the decline of America's steel industry, the effects of the energy crisis, Pittsburgh's rebirth as a world class medical center, and travelling to Germany to cover the return of the hostages from Iran.

From 1982 to 1986, he worked as the evening co-anchor and reporter on WPLG in Miami, Florida, where he reported on the cocaine wars that wracked that community, the influx of Caribbean refugees, and the 1982 riots. It was during those riots that a news cruiser carrying Schneider and his photographer was attacked, but both survived without injury.

In August 1983, Schneider and co-anchor Ann Bishop were cited by the trade magazine "Electronic Media" as one of the best news teams in the country. Schneider was recruited in 1986 by WCBS-TV, the flagship station of CBS in New York City, where he anchored the 5:30 and 11:00 p.m. nightly newscasts. During his career at the station, he also moderated the 1988 New York City Presidential debate, and covered the 1987 stock market crash, and Pope John Paul's first trip to the United States.

In August 1989, he became news anchor for ABC's World News This Morning and Good Morning America, where he served as the regular substitute for host Charles Gibson. He also contributed reports to ABC's 20/20 news magazine and Nightline, including live reports from the landfalls of Hurricanes Hugo and Andrew. Schneider also anchored ABC's overnight and morning coverage of the Persian Gulf War, splitting anchor duties with Peter Jennings and Ted Koppel. Schneider anchored ABC's morning coverage of the 1992 Democratic and Republican National Conventions.

In July 1993, Schneider left ABC to join NBC News, co-anchoring Weekend Today with Jackie Nespral from 1993 to 1995, and with Giselle Fernandez in 1995. During that time, he also reported for Dateline NBC, was a substitute anchor for NBC Nightly News, Meet the Press, guest hosted on CNBC's Equal Time with Mary Matalin, and on the Tom Snyder Show. He also hosted a CNBC summer replacement series entitled "Mike Schneider".

Leaving NBC News in 1995, Schneider became a national political correspondent for the Fox News, joining the channel before its launch in 1996. During this time at the network, he reported extensively on the Presidential campaign trail, and anchored Fox's coverage of the Presidential primaries, Democratic and Republican National Conventions, and Election Night. He also anchored the network's flagship nightly news program, The Schneider Report, which featured guest interviews and general news coverage.

Schneider left daily broadcasting in 1998, devoting himself to outside business and education interests. He was approached by Democratic Party officials who wanted him to return to Pennsylvania and challenge incumbent Gov. Tom Ridge. Schneider declined, instead deciding to run for Congress from his home district, New Jersey District 5. Facing off against multiple-term incumbent Marge Roukema, Schneider ran on a platform of health care reform and campaign finance reform, refusing to take special interest money. The multi-term moderate Roukema won the election; it would take until Josh Gottheimer ousted Roukema's successor Scott Garrett in 2016 that the Democrats would win the seat.

Schneider joined Bloomberg TV in January, 2003, first anchoring the morning broadcasts, and then shifting to evenings in 2007 when he created "Night Talk", an hour-long, prime time talk show. The program's guests included John McCain, Richard Branson and David Rockefeller, as well as actors, musicians, artists and writers, including Pulitzer winner John Updike, a month before Updike's death. Schneider anchored a series of Bloomberg TV specials, on subjects ranging from the struggles at General Motors, short selling of stocks, hidden fees associated with 401(k) retirement plans, the treatment of sugar cane workers in Brazil, and questions about the products endorsed by the AARP.

Those programs won two Emmy awards and four Emmy nominations, as well as recognition by the Foreign Press Association in London, and the New York Press Club, among others. Night Talk received a CableFAX award in the 'talk show/commentary' category. Night Talk was cancelled and last aired on February 3, 2009, as Bloomberg TV ceased prime time production in New York.

Schneider signed on to narrate CNBC Titans in May, 2011, and, in September, 2011, became anchor and managing editor of NJ Today, airing weeknights on PBS member stations NJTV (now NJ PBS) and Thirteen/WNET in New York City. He announced that as of June 30, 2014, he was giving up the anchor seat of NJ Today to become senior correspondent and concentrate on other projects. Mary Alice Williams took over the anchor position, while Schneider prepped his adventure/history special for production.
