= Linda Vester =

American television news personality

- Born: June 11, 1965 (age 61); Cincinnati, Ohio, U.S.
- Education: Boston University
- Spouse: Glenn H. Greenberg
- Family: Hank Greenberg (father-in-law); Stephen Greenberg (brother-in-law)

Linda Vester (born June 11, 1965) is an American television news host. She was the anchor of NBC News at Sunrise on NBC and DaySide with Linda Vester on the Fox News. She left television in 2005 to raise her children. She later produced an award-winning documentary and most recently founded a website for moms.

== Early life and education ==
Linda Vester is the daughter of the late Joan Vester Schoettinger and the late John Vester of Cincinnati, Ohio. She graduated magna cum laude from Boston University with a bachelor's degree in journalism in 1987. She received an honors diploma from the Sorbonne in France after attending for one semester in 1985. In 1998 she was awarded a Fulbright Scholarship to study Arabic and Middle East Affairs at the American University in Cairo, Egypt. She learned to speak both French and Arabic fluently

== Career ==
Vester began her journalism career while interning for CBS News's Paris Bureau in 1985 and Boston bureau in 1986–87. In 1987, her first on-air position as a general news reporter was at KHGI-TV in Kearney, Nebraska. After pausing to pursue her Fulbright Scholarship in Egypt, she was hired by NBC News to be groomed as a foreign correspondent.

Her training at NBC began in 1989 as a researcher and field producer in New York. In early 1990, NBC News management sent her to affiliate WFLA-TV to continue her on-air training, with the provision that they could call on her to report for the network when needed.

NBC exercised that provision when Iraq invaded Kuwait in 1990, which led to Operation Desert Shield and Operation Desert Storm. Because of Vester's Arabic language ability and background in Middle East Affairs, NBC temporarily pulled her from WFLA-TV to report from Saudi Arabia for its affiliate stations.

When the Gulf War ended, Vester returned to WFLA-TV until 1992, when she was dispatched to NBC's Washington affiliate, WRC-TV, in a shared agreement during which she reported for the affiliate on weekdays and for the network on weekends. During that period she covered the White House, Pentagon and State Department as well as the humanitarian disaster from Somalia.

In mid-1993, Vester was promoted to full-time network correspondent, reporting for NBC's Weekend Today program. Assignments included reporting from Haiti during a coup d'étatt. In early 1994, she was posted to NBC's London bureau, covering foreign affairs for all of the network's newscasts. Among her assignments were the Rwandan genocide, about which she later produced the award-winning 2005 documentary “Back Home”, directed by Rwandan refugee J.B. Rutagarama.

In 1996, Vester was reassigned back to the United States, reporting from NBC's Chicago bureau. A year later, she was promoted to anchor of NBC News at Sunrise and moved to New York. During this time she also anchored afternoon news coverage on MSNBC.

In 1999, Vester was hired by Fox News Channel to host its afternoon newscasts. She anchored part of the channel's live coverage during 9/11 and hosted an exclusive interview with O.J. Simpson. In 2003, Fox News debuted a news program with a live audience, Dayside with Linda Vester. She continued in this position until July 2005, while pregnant with her second child. Then-CEO Roger Ailes agreed to release her from her contract to be a stay-at-home mom. Juliet Huddy and Mike Jerrick hosted DaySide until it was replaced with The Live Desk with Martha MacCallum in late 2006.

== Personal life ==
Linda Vester, a Roman Catholic, married Glenn H. Greenberg, a Wall Street investor and son of baseball Hall of Famer Hank Greenberg and Caral Gimbel, the daughter of Bernard Gimbel of the Gimbel's department store family, on May 5, 2001, in New York City. Together they have four children in addition to Greenberg's three grown children from his prior marriage.

While raising their children, philanthropy became a priority for Vester. She serves as a trustee for the Institute of International Education, which administers the prestigious Fulbright Scholarship. She also serves as a trustee for Summer Steps, an early-childhood education program in New York that prepares low-income preschoolers for kindergarten.

Vester and Greenberg have endowed a psychiatry chair at Yale Medical School for the study of PTSD. They were inspired to do so after Vester experienced PTSD in the Gulf War and Rwanda. They are avid supporters of the Warrior Scholar Project, an academic boot camp that helps Iraq and Afghanistan veterans complete their college education after combat. They also are involved with the Posse Foundation, currently financially supporting the college education of a group of Iraq and Afghanistan veterans. In addition, Vester has endowed a college scholarship for girls at her former high school, Ursuline Academy, in Cincinnati, Ohio.

== Sexual harassment accusation ==
In April 2018, Vester accused NBC Anchor Tom Brokaw of two incidents of sexual harassment, when she was working for NBC. She accused him of tickling and trying to kiss her on separate occasions while she worked there in the 1990s. Brokaw gave a different version of the incidents, denying any harassment.
