= Bob Jamieson =

Former American news correspondent

Robert John Jamieson is an American retired television news correspondent for ABC News until January 2008. After getting his start in local news in St. Louis and Chicago, he joined NBC's national news bureau in 1971. There he reported on a variety of national and international news, including several conflicts in the Middle East. Jamieson was a frequent substitute news anchor on Today throughout the 1980s, filled in as anchor on NBC Nightly News,rotated with John Palmer on the Sunday edition from (1984-1986) and served as the anchor of NBC News at Sunrise from 1986 to January 1987. From March 1987 to September 1988, he hosted Before Hours, a 15-minute early morning business news program that was a joint production of NBC News and The Wall Street Journal. He joined ABC in 1990.

He is a son of Robert Arthur Jamieson, a Scottish immigrant who was a prominent citizen of Peoria, Illinois. His elder brother was Dick Jamieson, a professional football coach.

Bob Jamieson studied at Knox College but completed his bachelor's degree at Bradley University. In 1996 Knox awarded him an honorary Doctor of Letters degree.

== Career in Chicago Television News ==
Jamieson was the lead weekday anchorman at WBBM-TV, the CBS owned-and-operated station in Chicago, during most of 1971. In January 1971, he was named replacement for anchorman Wayne Fariss, who had moved to a Miami television station. Jamieson was WBBM-TV's lead anchorman until October 22, 1971, when Bob McBride of WJBK-TV in Detroit replaced him.

In early 1971, Jamieson was anchor of "The Big News," WBBM-TV's 5 p.m. local news hour and its 10 p.m. half-hour newscast. In fall 1971, WBBM-TV moved the "CBS Evening News with Walter Cronkite" from 6 p.m. to 5:30 p.m. Jamieson anchored half-hour local newscasts at 6 p.m. and 10 p.m. until he left the station on October 22, 1971.

At WBBM-TV in March 1971, Jamieson reported a five-part series on "The Sexualization of America." A newspaper ad promoting the series queried, "Have our sexual outlooks changed? Are we less uptight about our libidos? Is there really a "Sexual Revolution" going on?"

A Chicago Tribune columnist wrote of Jamieson's anchorship at WBBM-TV in 1971 that he had "one of the fastest deliveries in television." The columnist added, "Jamieson has an uncanny facility with words, aided in part by his own editing of the copy before he reads it on the air. The pace adds excitement to the show, but the content is concise, factual and not sensationalized." The columnist also observed that Jamieson looked "like David Brinkley's younger brother and sounds like Harry Reasoner."

Jamieson moved to WMAQ-TV, the NBC owned-and-operated station in Chicago, in late 1971. He was a reporter at WMAQ-TV, but sometimes was a weekend newscast anchor. He also contributed stories to NBC News from Chicago. His first report for NBC Nightly News aired on November 5, 1971. It concerned unemployment of blacks in the Chicago area. His second "Nightly News" report, which aired on December 30, 1971, examined how changes in the military draft law affected his hometown of Peoria, Illinois.

He eventually became a full-time general assignment reporter for NBC News, based in Chicago. Jamieson contributed sixteen stories to NBC Nightly News in 1972 and thirty-eight stories in 1973. Topics included Midwestern floods, grain and meat prices, the aviation industry and a feature about singing telegrams. On the April 19, 1977 edition of NBC News "Today," Jamieson returned to his hometown of Peoria, Illinois to note changes since he left.
