= John Palmer (TV journalist) =

American TV journalist (1935–2013)

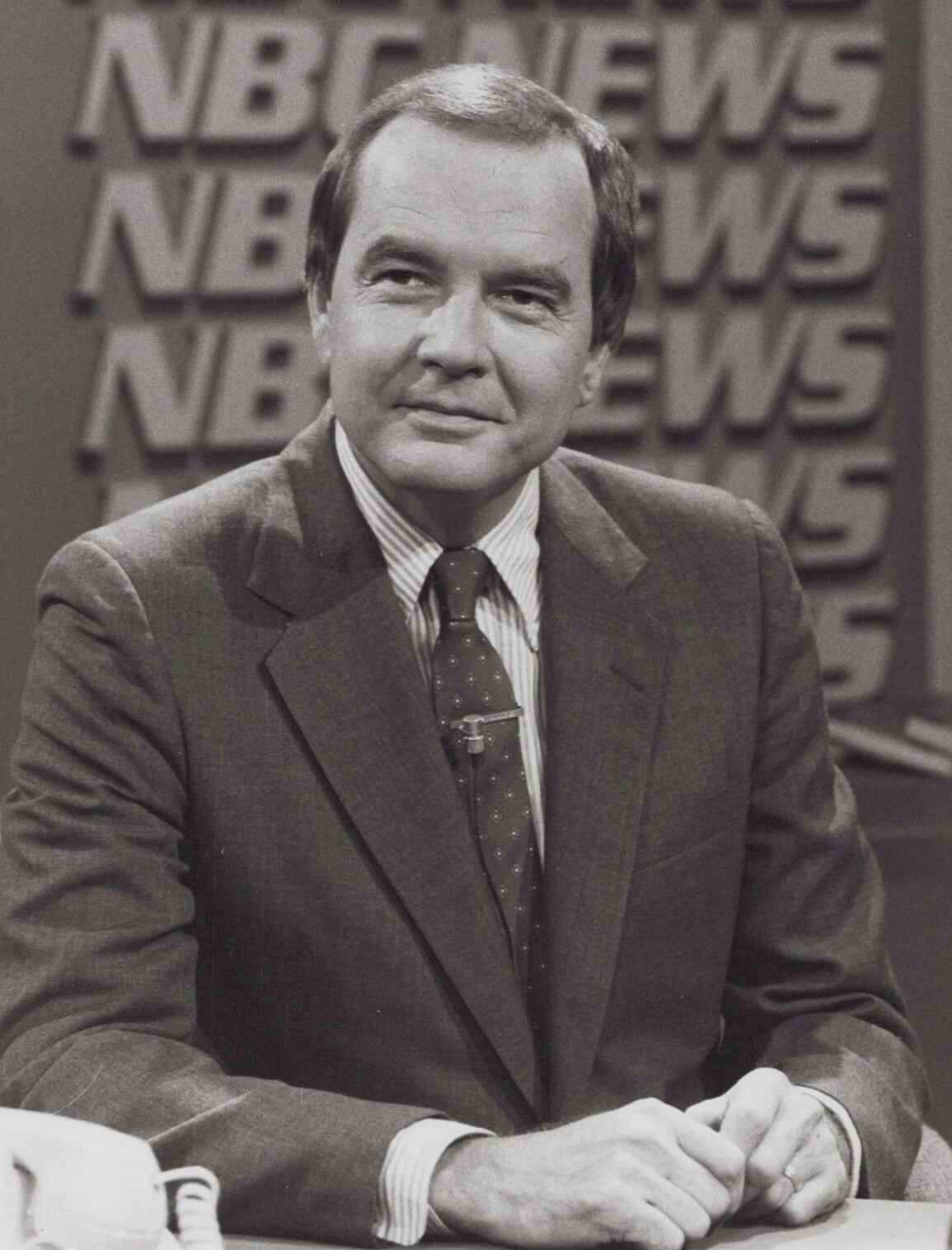
- Palmer, c. 1982
- Born: John Spencer Palmer; September 10, 1935; Kingsport, Tennessee, U.S.
- Died: August 3, 2013 (aged 77); Washington, D.C., U.S.
- Education: Northwestern University (BS); Columbia University (MS)
- Occupation: Television journalist

John Spencer Palmer (September 10, 1935 – August 3, 2013) was an American news correspondent, television broadcaster and news anchor for NBC News.

== Career ==
=== NBC News ===
Palmer worked for the NBC network over the course of 40 years, first from 1962 to 1990; then again from 1994 until his retirement in 2002. During his tenure with NBC News, he held several positions, including correspondent stints in Chicago, Paris, and the Middle East; White House correspondent (1979–1982); anchor of the Sunday edition of NBC Nightly News (1984-1986 & 1996) and news anchor for The Today Show (1982–1989).

In April 1980, Palmer reported on the failure of Operation Eagle Claw, the mission to rescue the American hostages held by Iran. This earned him the Merriman Smith Memorial Award for excellence in presidential news coverage, becoming the first broadcast journalist to ever receive this prestigious award.

On January 28, 1986, Palmer broke into NBC's regularly scheduled programing from the New York news desk at 11:40 am to report "...we've just witnessed the launch of the Space Shuttle Challenger ... there has been a major problem with that launch." As a replay of the launch began to play, Palmer's calm voice over of the footage shown brought the chilling news to the nation ... "In just a few moments you will see an explosion. The Space Shuttle Challenger apparently exploded ... you will see it very clearly on your television sets."

Palmer officially joined the Today cast as news anchor on September 27, 1982, replacing Chris Wallace, who had read the news and served as Bryant Gumbel and Jane Pauley's Washington co-anchor. The team of Gumbel, Pauley, Palmer, Willard Scott, and Gene Shalit helped take The Today Show to the top of the ratings in 1986, where it stayed until the end of the decade. In the late 1980s, Palmer was the primary substitute co-host of Today on days when Gumbel was away.

=== Post-Today ===
After serving as Today news anchor for seven years, Palmer was abruptly replaced by Deborah Norville in September 1989, and was moved to Norville's old position at NBC News at Sunrise. WTVJ, the NBC owned-and-operated television station in Miami, offered Palmer the lead local news anchor chair in late 1989, but Palmer turned down the opportunity. Palmer left NBC News in March 1990 to anchor a syndicated program, Instant Recall. After that show was canceled, Palmer joined the Christian Science Monitor in December 1991 as anchor of Monitor Channel's short-lived World Monitor newscast. He later served as Washington correspondent for Monitor Radio.

In 1994, NBC News Washington bureau chief Tim Russert and NBC News president Andrew Lack invited Palmer to return to the network as a Washington correspondent, and Palmer accepted. He was soon back on familiar ground, serving as White House correspondent for the weekend edition of NBC Nightly News and an occasional substitute news anchor for The Today Show. He retired from NBC News in January 2002.

Palmer was host of The Informed Citizen and The Prudent Advisor on Retirement Living TV.

== Awards ==
- Overseas Press Club Award and a National Emmy Awards for his reporting on the famine in Africa
- National Headliners Awards for coverage of the fighting in Lebanon
- Emmy for his reporting on America's space program
- The "Distinguished Service in Broadcasting Award" presented by College of Journalism at the University of Georgia.
- The 1987 National Father's Day Committee Award

He was also the recipient of several honorary Doctorate degrees.

== Book ==
- Palmer, John. (October 7, 2014) Newscatcher: A Memoir by John Palmer. (Published posthumously)

== Personal life ==
Palmer was born in Kingsport, Tennessee, and graduated from Dobyns-Bennett High School. He was a graduate of Northwestern University and obtained a master's degree from Columbia University. Palmer died on August 3, 2013, at the age of 77, in Washington, D.C., from pulmonary fibrosis. In 2014, his book Newscatcher: A Memoir by John Palmer was published posthumously, which Palmer had started working on before his death.

Preceded by Chris Wallace	Today Show News Anchor; September 27, 1982-July 14, 1989	Succeeded by Deborah Norville
