= Faith Daniels =

American journalist

Faith Daniels is an American television news anchor, reporter, and talk show host.

== Early life ==
Daniels was born to an unwed mother and lived eight months in a Catholic orphanage before being adopted by Steven A. Skowronski, a sheet metal worker, and his wife, Mary, who would name their daughter Faith Agostine Skowronski. Daniels grew up in Washington, Pennsylvania, and graduated magna cum laude from Bethany College in Bethany, West Virginia, in 1979.

== Media career ==
While still a junior at Bethany College, she began her media career in 1978, working as an intern at WTRF-TV in Wheeling, West Virginia, where she was initially credited as Faith Agostine. In 1981, Daniels moved to Peoria, Illinois, where she worked for WRAU-TV and WMBD-TV, the ABC and CBS affiliates. The following year, she moved to WBNS-TV in Columbus, Ohio to become the noon anchor. In 1983, she joined WTAE-TV in Pittsburgh, Pennsylvania.

Daniels' national news career began at CBS News in the spring of 1985, where she anchored the CBS Morning News. At age 28, she was one of the youngest national news anchors. She joined NBC in June 1990 as the news anchor for Today and the NBC Sunday Nightly News, and she became anchor of the now-defunct NBC News at Sunrise. In 1991, Daniels became the first journalist to host her own national daily talk show,A Closer Look (later renamed Faith Daniels), which was part of NBC's midday daytime schedule. Among the show's prominent interviews was with Stacey Koon—one of the police officers involved in the beating of Rodney King—on October 24, 1992.

Media offices
Preceded by Deborah Norville	Today Show News Anchor; June 11, 1990-May 1, 1992	Succeeded by Margaret Larson
