= Margaret Larson =

American broadcast journalist

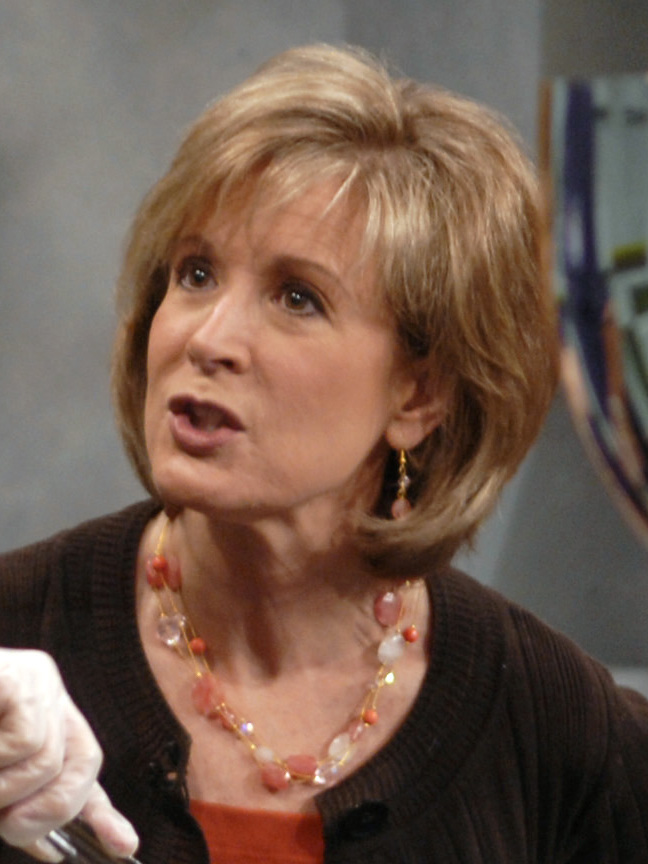
Larson in 2010

Margaret Larson (née Pelley; born February 24, 1958) is an American retired broadcast journalist and television presenter. Her most notable position was with NBC News. She worked as a foreign correspondent from 1990 to 1992 as news anchor and substitute anchor from 1992 to 1994 on the Today show, later returning as a correspondent for Dateline NBC. For her last decade in journalism, she spent time volunteering with international aid organization Mercy Corps and acting as a board member. After a brief stint at KIRO-TV in Seattle as an anchor, she moved to KING-TV in the mid-'90s. She left KING-TV to accept a full-time position as Vice President of Communications for Mercy Corps in 2002. Larson later left this position to become an independent contractor for international aid organizations in order to broaden her focus to Africa and HIV/AIDS issues. Larson has consulted with Mercy Corps, World Vision, Global Partnerships, and PATH. In March 2010, she returned to KING-TV to host a one-hour lifestyle show, New Day Northwest, weekday mornings. Larson announced her retirement in early July 2020, with her last New Day Northwest episode broadcast on July 31, 2020.

Media offices
Preceded by Faith Daniels	Today Show News Anchor; May 4, 1992 – January 1, 1994	Succeeded by Matt Lauer
