= Jackie Nespral =

American television anchor (born 1967)

- Born: April 21, 1967 (age 58); Florida, U.S.
- Education: University of Miami (B.A.)
- Occupation: Journalist
- Employer: NBC News
- Spouse: Dr. Armando Hassun Jr.
- Children: 4
- Relatives: Jose, Frank (brothers)

Jackie Nespral (born April 21, 1966) is an American television anchor for WTVJ, the NBC owned and operated station in Miami.

== Early life and education ==
Nespral was born in Florida, to Cuban parents. She grew up in the Little Havana section of Miami and attended St. Brendan High School in Westchester, Florida, where she graduated in 1984.

Nespral began her entertainment and television career as a college student at the University of Miami, where she was elected Orange Bowl Queen in Miami in 1985 and 1986 and was also inducted into the university's Iron Arrow Honor Society.

She graduated from the University of Miami with degrees in psychology and communications. Following her graduation from the University of Miami, Nespral went on to complete a degree in print and broadcast journalism at Florida International University in Miami, Florida.

== Television career ==
=== Univision, Television Marti and CNN ===
Nespral began her career in television as a spokesmodel on Sábado Gigante on Univision. She then joined Univision's TV Mujer (or TV Woman) on its final season. After the cancellation of TV Mujer in 1990, she was chosen as one of the anchors of Univision's national news show Noticias y Mas (News and More), the predecessor to Primer Impacto (First Impact).

She also worked for the Cuban-American channel, Television Marti, and at CNN's Miami affiliate, Dynamic Cablevision.

=== The Today Show ===
Nespral moved to New York City in 1991, where she became the first Hispanic American network television news anchor as the weekend co-host of NBC's Today with Scott Simon.

=== WTVJ-TV ===
In 1995, Nespral returned to Miami, where she was assigned as anchorwoman for WTVJ, the NBC O&O station in Miami. She currently anchors the 5pm, 5:30pm, 6pm, and 11pm newscasts for the station.

== Personal ==
Nespral is a board director member for the March of Dimes organization and the University of Miami. She is also involved with the Columbia Women's Center, the Child Development Center and the Amigos For Kids organizations.

Nespral has earned four Emmy Awards, an Easter Seals award and an honorable mention from the American Women in Radio and Television organization during her television news career. She has also received the key to Miami and a Resolution of Tribute from the University of Miami.

She is married to Dr. Armando Hassun Jr. with whom she has three daughters (Frances, Carolina, and Isabella) and one son (Armando, Jr.). She has two brothers (Jose and Frank).
