= Deborah Norville =

American journalist (born 1958)

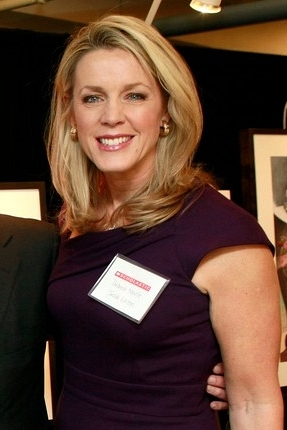
- Norville in 2011
- Born: Deborah Anne Norville; August 8, 1958 (age 68); Dalton, Georgia, U.S.
- Education: University of Georgia (BA)
- Occupation: Television journalist
- Years active: 1979–present
- Notable credit(s): Inside Edition; CBS News; Today; NBC News at Sunrise; Deborah Norville Yarn
- Spouse: Karl Gert Wellner (m. 1987)
- Children: 3
- Awards: 2024 Edward F. McLaughlin Lifetime Achievement Award
- Website: www.deborahnorville.com

Deborah Anne Norville (born August 8, 1958) is an American television journalist and businesswoman. Norville is a former anchor of Inside Edition, a syndicated television news magazine, a position she held from March 6, 1995 to May 21, 2025. She markets and sells a line of yarns (Deborah Norville Collection) for knit and crochet enthusiasts, manufactured by Premier Yarns. Previously, she was an anchor and correspondent for CBS News and earlier co-host of Today on NBC. Her book Thank You Power was a New York Times best-seller.

== Early life ==
Norville was born in Dalton, Georgia. She won her town's local Junior Miss contest, a beauty contest for high school senior girls and represented Georgia in the 1976 America's Junior Miss pageant. She did not win, but credits seeing the behind-the-scenes work of the CBS Television production team as inspiring her to switch her career goal from law to television journalism. She hosted the 1999 America's Junior Miss contest.

=== Education ===
Norville is a graduate of the University of Georgia. She graduated summa cum laude in three years with a perfect 4.0 grade point average, earning a BA degree in journalism from the university's Grady College of Journalism and Mass Communication. She was named a First Honor Graduate and elected to Phi Beta Kappa. During her studies, she served on the Main Court of the University's Student Judiciary and was a member of Delta Delta Delta sorority.

== Career ==
=== Early career ===
Norville began her television career while still a college student. She received an internship through Georgia Public Television, where she worked on The Lawmakers, a nightly program covering the Georgia General Assembly. She was spotted by an executive of WAGA-TV in Atlanta, who offered her a summer internship. As Norville recalled, "The third day they were short on reporters and they asked me to cover a news story." She reported that evening on the six o'clock news and was later offered a weekend reporting position during her senior year in college. The 60-mile (97 km) commute between school in Athens and work in Atlanta was grueling, as remembered by Norville in an interview with Larry B. Dendy for the Georgia Alumni Record (February 1990): "I'd leave the university on Friday afternoon and drive to Atlanta, and sometimes I had a place to stay and sometimes I slept in my car in the parking lot. I worked Saturday and Sunday; Sunday night after the 11:00 p.m. show I'd drive back and go to class Monday morning." In January 1979, she conducted a live interview with President Jimmy Carter.

Norville joined WAGA-TV as a full-time reporter after graduating and was named weekend anchor in October 1979. In January 1982, she was hired as a reporter and later an anchor by WMAQ-TV, the NBC-owned station in Chicago. A brief glimpse of Norville on a billboard, during her time at WMAQ-TV can be seen in the background in the 1986 film Running Scared starring Gregory Hines and Billy Crystal. In 1986, when it was announced Norville would be joining NBC News in New York, Mayor Harold Washington declared "Deborah Norville Week" in Chicago.

=== NBC News ===
Norville joined NBC News in January 1987 as anchor of NBC News at Sunrise, becoming the only solo female anchor of a network newscast. Ratings on Sunrise jumped 40 percent when she joined the program, which led to her being asked to occasionally substitute on NBC's Today Show and Sunday Today. In August 1989, a documentary in which Norville was the primary host, Bad Girls, on violent teenaged girls, was the seventh most watched show the week it aired, according to Nielsen ratings.

In September 1989, Norville was named news anchor on Today. Soon after, Today co-host Jane Pauley announced her desire to leave the Today Show, and Norville was named her successor. Pauley went on to host a prime-time show, Real Life with Jane Pauley. Norville became co-host of Today in January 1990. During her tenure on Today, she won an Emmy award for her role in NBC's coverage of the democratic uprising in Romania. Ratings on Today declined after Norville's arrival. NBC management was accused of mishandling the transition. One insider told People magazine, "NBC handled the whole situation in a very poor manner. I don't think she [Deborah] blames anyone in particular. I just think she feels the situation was handled unprofessionally—in an undignified manner for both her and Jane." After Norville took maternity leave on the birth of her first child, she did not return to the program. Norville was subsequently replaced on Today by Katie Couric.

=== ABC Network Radio ===
In May 1991, ABC TalkRadio Networks announced Deborah Norville would be hosting a prime-time program, broadcast from her homes in New York and Long Island. The Deborah Norville Show: From Her Home to Yours featured newsmaker interviews and listener calls. It ran from September 1991 to October 1992, when Norville joined CBS News to resume her television career.

=== Return to television ===
Norville returned to television in October 1992, when she joined CBS News as a correspondent. She reported for Street Stories and 48 Hours, for which she won her second Emmy award for coverage of the Mississippi floods of 1994. She was later assigned to the CBS Evening News and named co-anchor with Dana King of America Tonight. From 1993 to 1995, Norville was a semiregular anchor of the CBS Sunday Evening News, which had been vacant since Connie Chung was elevated to co-anchor of the CBS Evening News.

In 1995, Norville was named anchor of Inside Edition, a syndicated newsmagazine. In March 2015, the show celebrated her 20th anniversary on the program, noting that she had become the longest-serving female anchor on national television. Among Norville's reports were her dispatches from the Davidson County, North Carolina, jail, billed as the "toughest in America"; her interview with Paula Jones, whose accusation of sexual harassment by then-president Bill Clinton led to the Monica Lewinsky scandal and impeachment proceedings, and her series of "jobs," notably the song she wrote and performed, "Keep On Movin." Set to music written by noted producer Junior Vasquez, Norville wrote the lyrics, a challenge she described in O, The Oprah Magazine. "The strength from meeting that challenge," she said, "is still with me. It's the boost you get from accomplishing something you never dreamed you could do."

In 2003, MSNBC announced Deborah Norville was joining its prime-time lineup to host a 9:00 p.m. program. She left Deborah Norville Tonight in 2005, citing the challenge of juggling her Inside Edition and MSNBC duties along with family responsibilities.

In 2015, Knit and Crochet Now!, a craft show seen on public television, announced the appointment of Norville as host of its upcoming season.

In April 2025, she announced that she will be leaving Inside Edition after 30 years. On May 21, 2025, Norville hosted her final episode.

In September 2025, she began hosting the syndicated/Game Show Network game show The Perfect Line.

=== Publishing ===
Alongside her television career, Norville has frequently worked as a writer. She served as a contributing editor to Inside Sports magazine in the 1980s and as a contributing editor to McCall's magazine from 1991 to 1993. She published the New York Times best-seller Thank You Power: Making the Science of Gratitude Work for You (Thomas Nelson, 2007), featuring the benefits found by research on gratitude. This was preceded by Back on Track: How To Straighten Out Your Life When It Throws You a Curve (Simon and Schuster, 1997), which drew on her earlier experiences on the Today Show.

The Power of Respect: Benefit from the Most Forgotten Element of Success (Thomas Nelson, 2009) explains—through scientific evidence—how respect is power in business, at home, and in your personal life. Her history of Inside Edition, The Way We Are: Heroes, Scoundrels, and Oddballs from 25 Years of Inside Edition, written with Charlie Carillo and with a foreword by Donald Trump (Inside Edition Books, 2013), details all 8,150 episodes of the show, celebrating its 25th anniversary.

Additionally, she has written several knit and crochet pattern books, most notably Knit With Deborah Norville—18 Classic Designs For The Whole Family (Leisure Arts, Inc., 2009). She has also written two children's books—I Don't Want to Sleep Tonight (Golden Books, 1999) and I Can Fly (Golden Books, 2001)—and contributed to several editions of the Chicken Soup for the Soul series.

=== Other activities ===
In 2008, Norville began performing in infomercials. In addition to commercials for anti-aging creams and lotions, she launched the Deborah Norville Collection of knit and crochet yarns in partnership with Premier Yarns, a North Carolina–based yarn manufacturer. Norville debuted the line at the 2009 Craft Hobby Show, the craft industry's premier convention, where she also served as the keynote speaker. The Norville line of yarns and other knit and crochet accessories are available in retail craft stores and online.

Also in 2008, Norville was a celebrity contestant on Are You Smarter than a 5th Grader? in which she made $100,000 for NYSPCC.

In 2013, Norville was elected to the board of directors of Viacom, serving on the company's compensation committee. She left the board in December 2019 when Viacom merged with CBS Corporation, the producer and distributor of Inside Edition, to form Paramount Global.

== Personal life ==
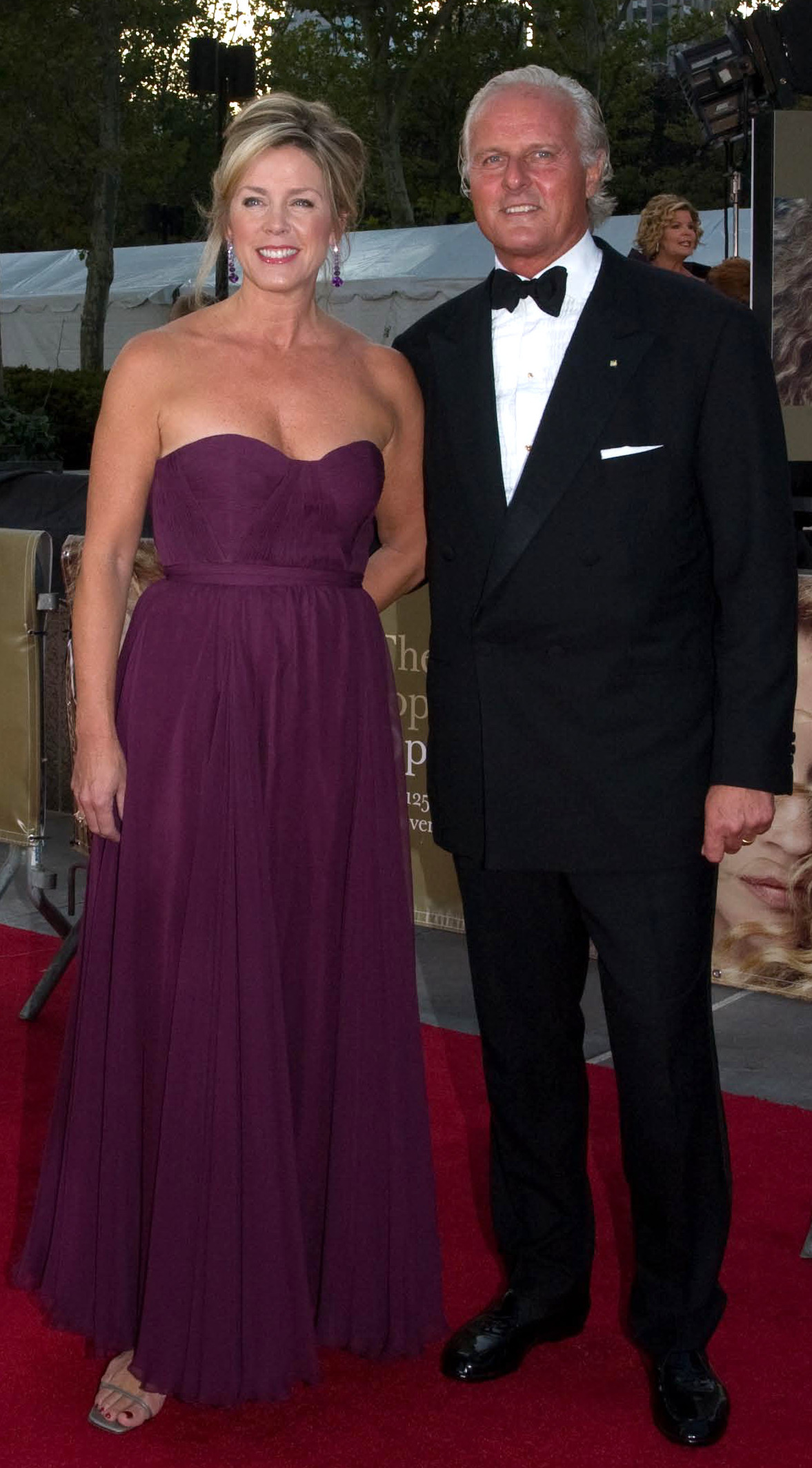
Norville and husband Karl Wellner at the Metropolitan Opera in 2008

Norville married Swedish businessman Karl Wellner in 1987; the couple has three children.

On April 1, 2019, Norville announced that she would be undergoing surgery to remove a cancerous thyroid nodule. The cancer was detected after a viewer noticed a lump on Norville's neck during one of her shows.

== See also ==
- New Yorkers in journalism
- Lisa Guerrero
