= Robert Troyer =

American lawyer

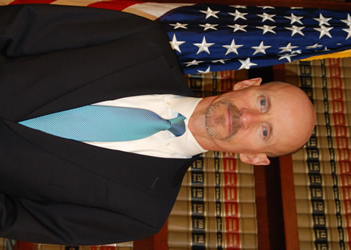

United States Attorney for the District of Colorado
- In office November 17, 2017 – October 25, 2018
- President: Donald Trump
- Preceded by: John F. Walsh
- Succeeded by: Jason R. Dunn

Personal details
- Born: Robert Campbell Troyer; December 15, 1960 (age 65) Denver, Colorado, U.S.
- Children: 2
- Education: Pomona College (BA); Boston College (JD)

Robert Campbell Troyer (born December 15, 1960) is an American lawyer from Colorado who formerly served as United States Attorney for the District of Colorado.

== Early life and education ==
He was born on December 15, 1960, in Denver, Colorado and later grew up in Maryland. He graduated from Pomona College with a Bachelor of Arts degree in English in 1984 and from Boston College Law School with a Juris Doctor degree in 1990. While attending Boston Law he served as Solicitations Editor for the Boston College Law Review. After graduating from college he taught high school English in Washington, DC for several years and worked during the summers as a commercial fisherman in Alaska.

== Legal career ==
From 1990 to 1993 he practiced civil litigation with the law firm of Ropes & Gray in Boston, Massachusetts. From 1993 to 1999 he practiced law with Brownstein Hyatt Farber Schreck in Denver. From 1999 to 2004 he was drug and violent-crime prosecutor with the United States Attorney's Office for the District of Colorado. From 2004 to 2010 he was a partner with Hogan Lovells in Denver. From 2010 to 2016 he served as a First Assistant United States Attorney for the United States Attorney's Office for the District of Colorado.

After leaving the U.S. Attorney's office, Troyer was hired to prepare a report on sexual abuse by Catholic clergy in Colorado.

== U.S. Attorney ==
Troyer became acting U.S. Attorney on August 12, 2016, upon the departure of John F. Walsh. On November 17, 2017, he was appointed by Jeff Sessions and served until October 25, 2018, when he was succeeded by Jason R. Dunn.

== Personal life ==
He is married and has two children.
