= AAI =

AAI may refer to:

== Arts and media ==
- Aai (1995 film), an Indian Marathi film
- Aai (2004 film), an Indian Tamil language film starring R. Sarath Kumar, Namitha Kapoor, Vadivelu, Kalabhavan Mani
- AAI (album), 2021 album by Mouse on Mars
- Ace Attorney Investigations: Miles Edgeworth, a 2009 spin-off video game that's part of the Ace Attorney series
- Allied Artists International, an American multinational mass media and entertainment corporation

== Businesses and organizations ==
=== Businesses ===
- AAI Corporation, a US defense company
- Adam Aircraft Industries, a US company
- Ahrens Aircraft Inc, an aircraft manufacturer established at Oxnard, California
- American Athletic Inc., an athletic apparel brand owned by Fruit of the Loom
- Arlington Asset Investment, a real estate investment trust headquartered in Arlington, Virginia
- AutoAlliance International, a joint-venture automobile assembly firm co-owned by Ford and Mazda
- Aviation Industries Ilyushin, a Russian company

=== Education and research ===
- Alliance Academy International, an international school following an American curriculum in Quito, Ecuador
- Andreyev Acoustics Institute, a Russian research facility dedicated to the study of acoustics
- Africa-America Institute, CIA-run education organization
- Angeline Academy of Innovation, a 6-12 school in the US

=== Sports organizations ===
- Associação Atlética Iguaçu, a Brazilian football team from the city of União da Vitória, Paraná state
- Athletics Ireland (Athletics Association of Ireland), governing body for athletics in Ireland

=== Other non-profit organizations ===
- Adım Adım Initiative, a volunteer-based social initiative in Turkey that promotes charitable giving
- Africa-America Institute, an international organization dedicated to increasing educational opportunity for young Africans and improving global understanding of Africa
- AIESEC Alumni International, an international project of association for former volunteer members, executive boards, international trainees or staff of AIESEC
- Airline Ambassadors International, a non-profit organization
- American Antitrust Institute, an independent Washington-based non-profit education, research, and advocacy organization
- American Association of Immunologists, a non-profit organization dedicated to advancing the field of immunology
- Arab American Institute, a non-profit organization based in Washington D.C. that focuses on the issues and interests of Arab-Americans nationwide
- Architectural Association of Ireland, an organisation dedicated to architecture
- Asian Arts Initiative, a non-profit organization in Philadelphia
- Atheist Alliance International, a global network of atheist organizations around the world

=== Other organizations ===
- Airports Authority of India, a wing of the ministry of aviation in India

== Science and technology ==
=== Biology and medicine ===
- Adrenaline autoinjector, a medical device for injecting a measured dose or doses of epinephrine
- Alpha amylase inhibitor, a group of proteins that blocks the Enzyme Alpha-Amylase
- AAI mode of an artificial pacemaker: Atrial chamber paced, Atrial chamber sensed, and Inhibiting response to sensing
- Atlantoaxial instability, caused by laxity of the transverse ligament of atlas, a ligament which arches across the ring of the atlas (the topmost cervical vertebra, which directly supports the skull)

=== Other uses in science and technology ===
- AAI Sparrowhawk, an American two seat pusher ultralight autogyro, available in kit form for amateur construction
- AAI Corporation Aerosonde, a small unmanned aerial vehicle (UAV) designed to collect weather data over oceans and remote areas
- AAI underwater revolver, an amphibious firearm intended for naval use
- Adult Attachment Interview, a method used in attachment theory
- Authentication and authorization infrastructure, access-control for network content

== Other uses ==
- The Aai, a group of Ancient Egyptian deities
- Arifama-Miniafia language, a language of Papua New Guinea
- Arraias Airport in Tocantins, Brazil (IATA airport code AAI)
