= Mincberg =

Mincberg is a surname. Notable people with the surname include:

- David Mincberg, American lawyer and sports executive
- Elliot Mincberg, American lawyer and government official
