= Ann Curry =

American journalist (born 1956)

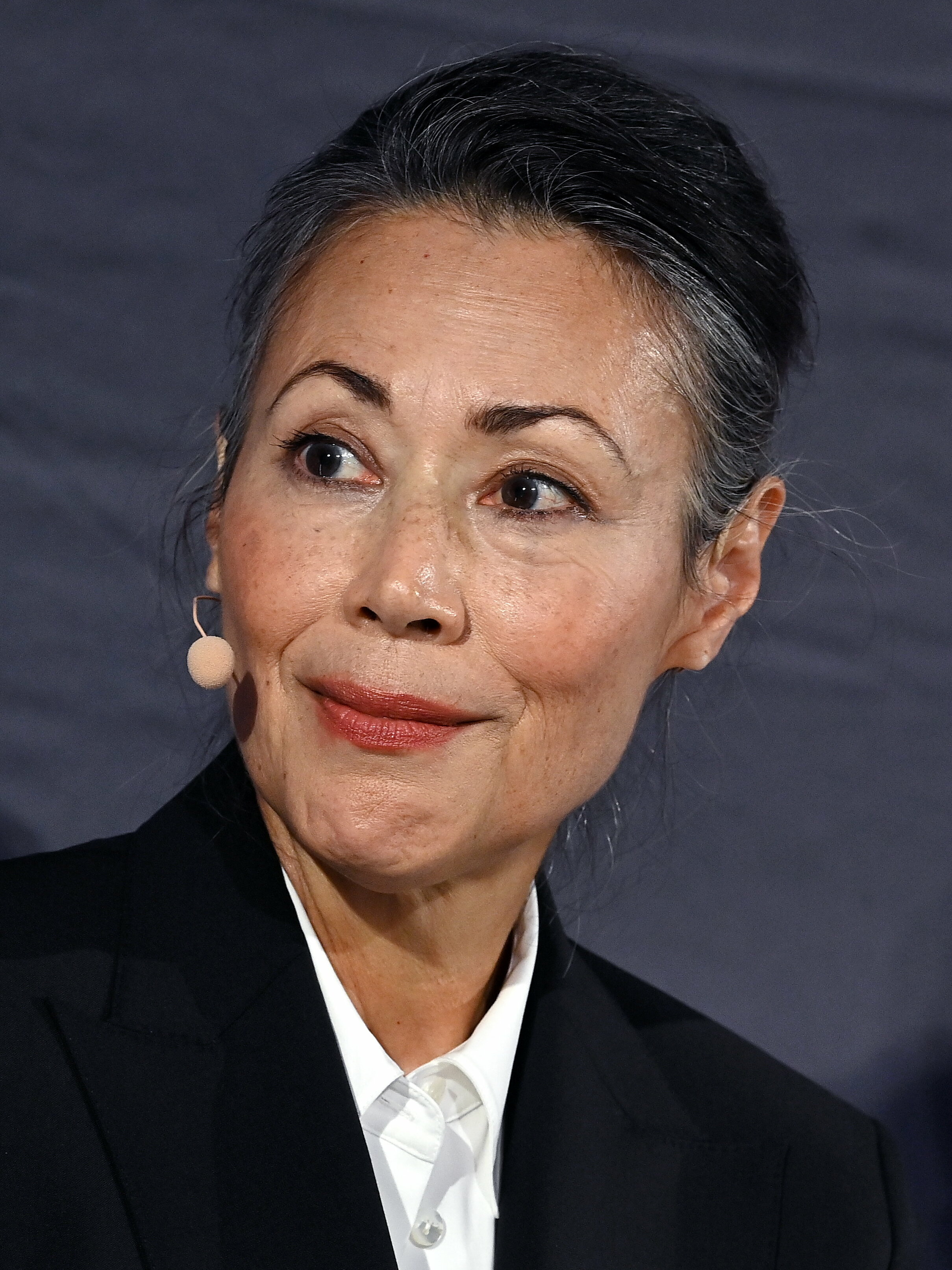
- Curry in 2022
- Born: November 19, 1956 (age 70); Agaña, Guam, U.S.
- Education: University of Oregon (BA)
- Occupation: Journalist
- Years active: 1978–present
- Spouse: Brian Ross (m. 1989)
- Children: 2

Ann Curry (born November 19, 1956) is an American journalist, who has been a reporter for more than 45 years, focused on war zones and natural disasters. She has reported from wars in Kosovo, Iraq, Syria, Lebanon, Israel, Afghanistan, Darfur, Congo, and the Central African Republic, as well as the 2004 Indian Ocean tsunami and the 2010 Haiti earthquake. Her appeal via Twitter regarding the latter disaster topped the site's "most powerful" list and was credited for helping speed the arrival of humanitarian planes.

In June 2012, she became the national and international correspondent-anchor for NBC News and the anchor at large for the Today show. She was co-anchor of Today from June 9, 2011, to June 28, 2012, and the program's news anchor from March 1997 until becoming co-anchor. She was also the anchor of Dateline NBC from 2005 to 2011.

In January 2015, Curry left NBC News after nearly 25 years to found her own multi-platform media startup. She continued to conduct news interviews on network television, including securing an exclusive interview with Iranian Foreign Minister Javad Zarif in 2015 about the Iran nuclear talks. She hosted and produced We'll Meet Again with Ann Curry from 2018 to 2019 on PBS.

== Early life and education ==
Ann Curry was born in Agaña, Guam, the daughter of Hiroe Nagase and Robert Paul "Bob" Curry. Her mother is Japanese, and her father, an American from Pueblo, Colorado, had Irish and German ancestry. Her parents met when her father, a career United States Navy sailor, worked as a streetcar conductor during the United States occupation of Japan after World War II. Although he was transferred out of Japan, he returned two years later to marry Nagase. Curry is the eldest of five children.

Curry lived in Japan for several years as a child, and attended the Ernest J. King School on the United States Fleet Activities Sasebo naval base in Sasebo, Nagasaki. During her childhood, she also lived in San Diego, Alameda, California, and Virginia Beach, Virginia. Later, she moved to Ashland, Oregon, where she graduated from Ashland High School. She graduated with a Bachelor of Arts in journalism from the University of Oregon in 1978.

== Career ==
=== 1978–1989 ===
Curry began her broadcasting career in 1978 as an intern at then NBC-affiliate (now CBS-affiliate) KTVL in Medford, Oregon. There she rose to become the station's first female news reporter. In 1980, Curry moved to NBC-affiliate KGW in Portland, where she was a reporter and anchor. Four years later, Curry moved to Los Angeles as a reporter for KCBS-TV and received two Emmy Awards while working as a reporter from 1984 to 1990.

=== 1990–2012 ===
In 1990, Curry joined NBC News, first as the NBC News Chicago correspondent then as the anchor of NBC News at Sunrise from 1991 to 1997. From 1993 to 1995 & again from 1996-1999 Curry was one of the rotating anchors of the Sunday edition of NBC Nightly News. Curry also served as a substitute news anchor for Matt Lauer from 1994 to 1997 at Today. From 1997 to 2011, she served as news anchor at Today, becoming the show's second-longest serving news anchor, behind Frank Blair, who served in that capacity from 1953 to 1975. During this time, she also served as a substitute anchor for Today. On June 24, 2005, Curry was named co-anchor of Dateline NBC with Stone Phillips; she remained as the primary anchor when Phillips left on July 2, 2007, until she replaced Meredith Vieira on Today in 2011. She was the primary substitute on NBC Nightly News from 2005 to 2011.

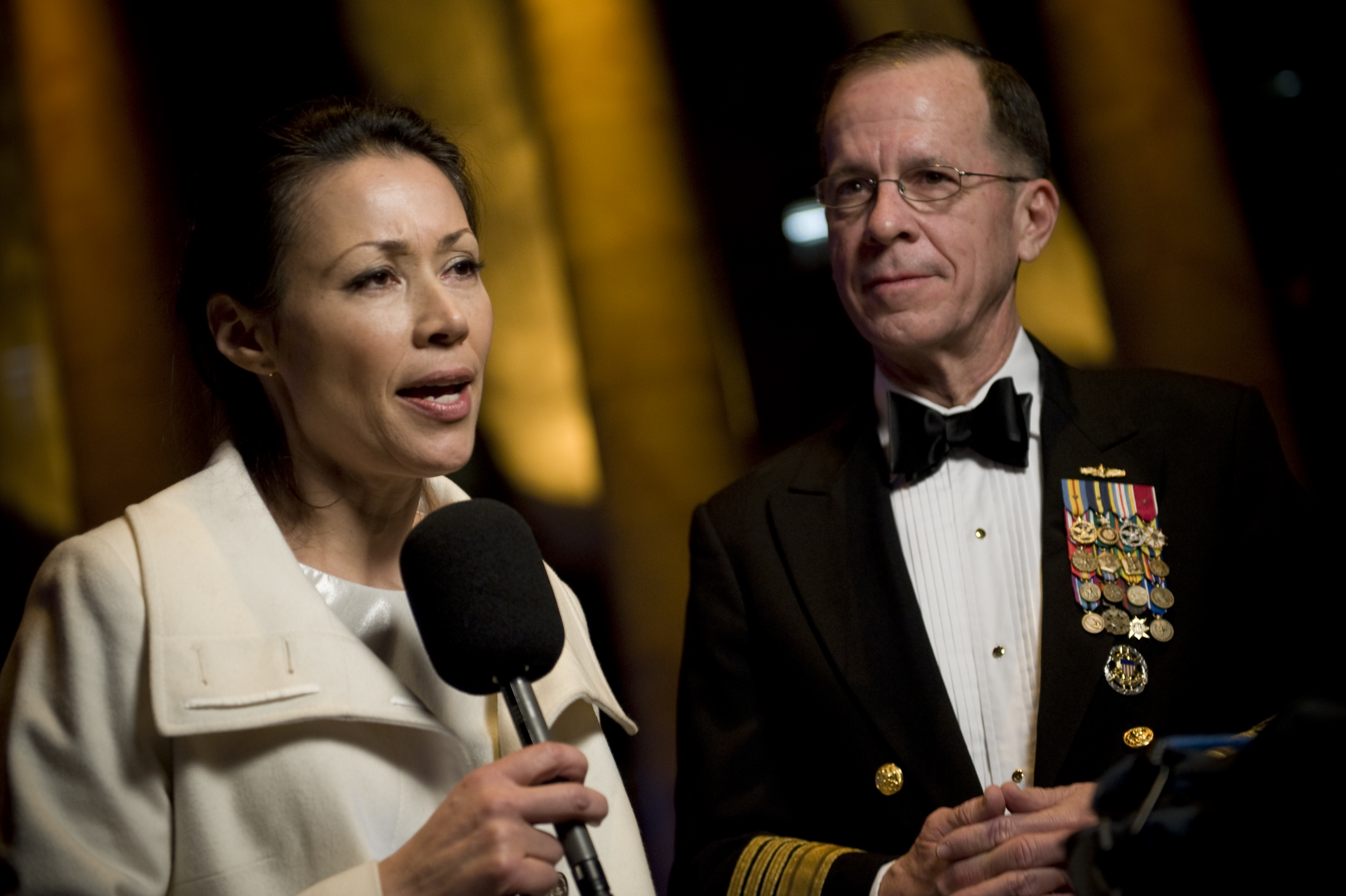
Curry covering the 2009 Commander in Chief's Ball, with Chairman of the Joint Chiefs of Staff Michael Mullen

Curry has reported on major international stories, filing stories from places such as Baghdad, Sri Lanka, Congo, Rwanda, Albania, and Darfur. Curry hosted NBC's primetime coverage and highlights of the Live Earth concerts on July 7, 2007, and also contributed with interviews for the special with New York City Mayor Michael Bloomberg and former Vice President Al Gore. Curry reported from the USS Theodore Roosevelt during the invasion of Afghanistan in November 2001, and had an exclusive interview with General Tommy Franks. She reported from Baghdad in early 2003, and then from the USS Constellation as the war in Iraq began. Curry was also the first network news anchor to report from inside the Southeast Asian tsunami zone in late 2004.

On December 17, 2007, Curry bungee-jumped off the Transporter Bridge in Middlesbrough, England, to raise money for charity. Her jump was shown live on the Today show.

In 2009, Curry traveled to Iran, where she interviewed then-President of Iran Mahmoud Ahmadinejad days before Ahmadinejad traveled to America to speak in front of the United Nations General Assembly.

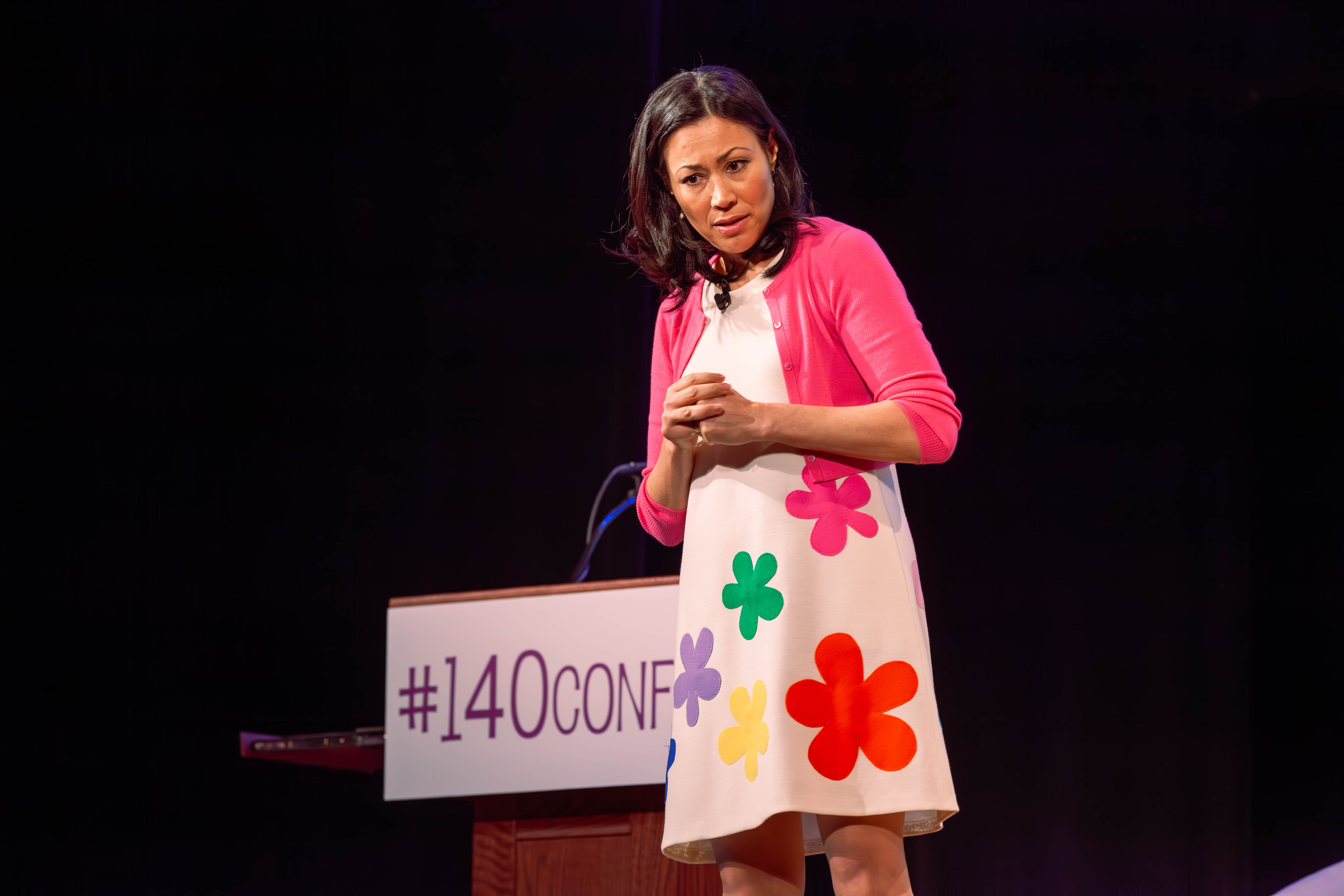
Curry in 2011

In 2011, Curry appeared in the first PBS Kids Sprout "Kindness Counts" public service announcement. She was the television host of the Macy's Thanksgiving Day Parade in 2011.

=== Departure from Today ===
In June 2012, Curry was widely reported as being replaced as co-host of Today. Curry hired attorney Robert Barnett to represent her in her discussions with NBC. On June 28, Curry announced in an emotional broadcast on the show that she was leaving Today. She signed a new multiyear contract with the network as NBC News national and international correspondent/anchor and Today anchor-at-large. Her departure had led to some discussions about racism, particularly as she was one of the most prominent Asian-American journalists on the national stage.

For a time, she led a seven-person unit producing content and reporting for NBC Nightly News with Lester Holt (for which she also was a regular substitute anchor), Dateline NBC, Rock Center with Brian Williams, Today, and MSNBC. Curry also anchored multiple NBC News primetime specials. On August 9, 2012, Curry made her first post-departure appearance on Today, when she reported a story during the show's coverage at the 2012 Summer Olympics in London. The reunion with her former co-anchor, Matt Lauer, was described in the media as "tense", "awkward", and "chilly". In September 2013, Lauer said he was disappointed in the way the media reported Curry's departure.

In January 2015, Curry was announced as officially leaving NBC News.

=== 2015–present ===
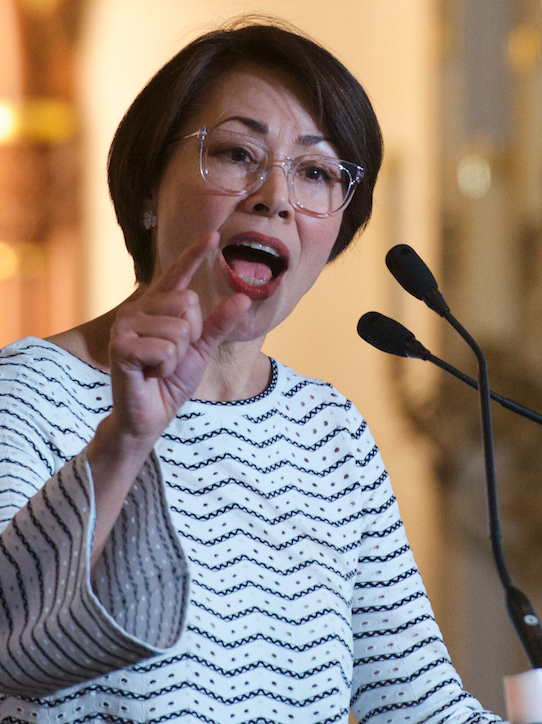
Curry in 2017

In June 2016, she moderated a panel discussion between the Dalai Lama and Lady Gaga at the 84th annual U.S. Conference of Mayors in Indianapolis. In July 2017, PBS announced a new documentary television series We'll Meet Again with Ann Curry hosted and co-produced by Curry. In November 2017, she attended WE Day at Xcel Energy Center in Saint Paul, Minnesota. In 2018, she also spoke at two other WE Day events, in Seattle and in Toronto.

In January 2018, Curry returned to television with her PBS series, We'll Meet Again. Developed by her own production company, the series focused on 12 stories of people searching for individuals who changed their lives. She then appeared on The View as guest co-host on January 23, 2018, where she addressed the controversies surrounding her departure from Today. In 2019, Curry hosted TNT/TBS's Chasing the Cure, also serving as executive producer.

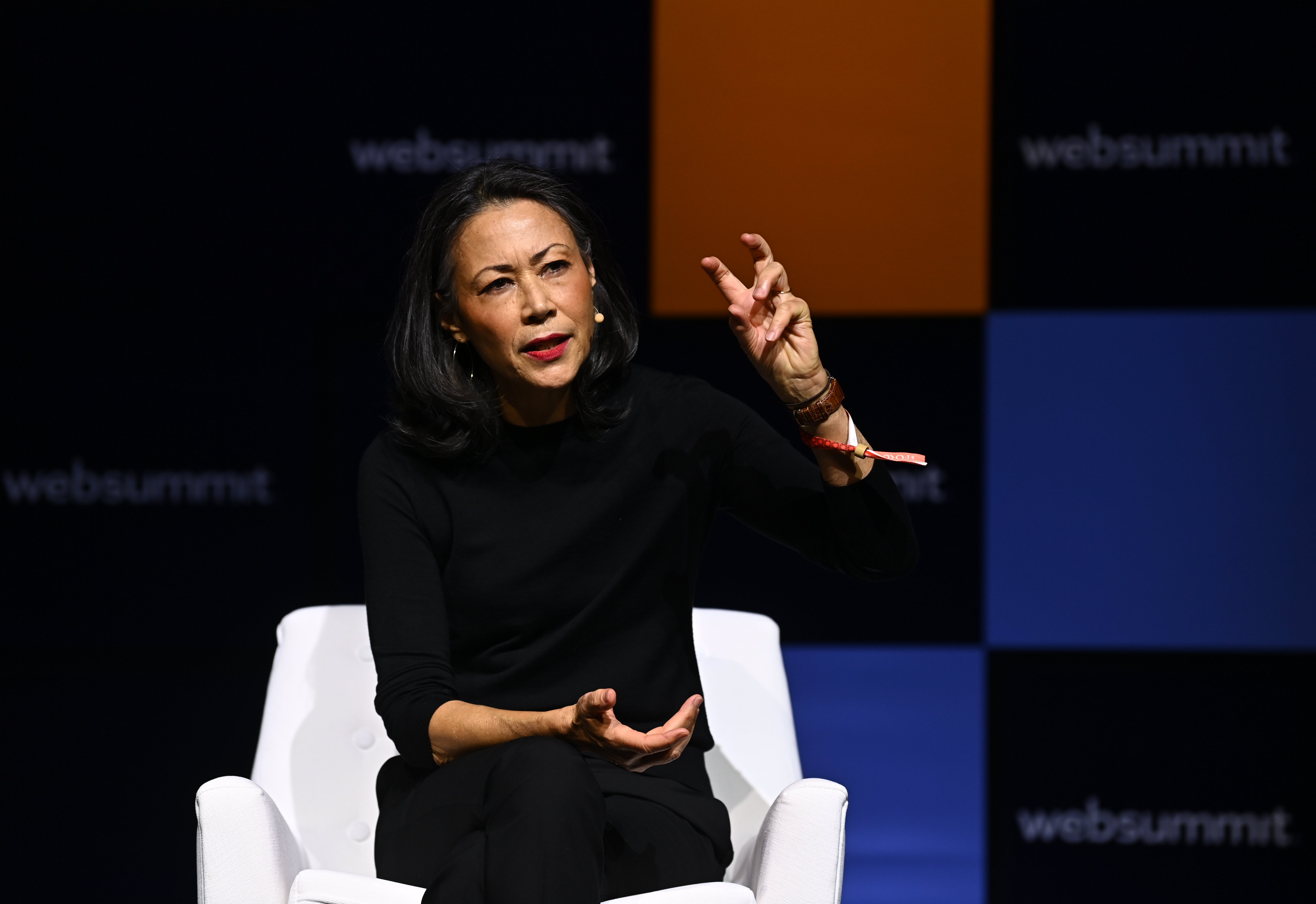
Curry during day one of Web Summit 2022 at the Altice Arena in Lisbon, in 2022

In 2018, the Washington Post reported that Curry had warned NBC of sexual misconduct by Matt Lauer in 2012, after a staffer told her she'd been sexually harassed, but was worried about being fired if she reported it. Lauer was fired from NBC after new allegations of abusing staff in 2017. When asked whether she felt informing NBC executives resulted in her 2012 firing from Today, Curry stated "I think that many people have guessed why (I was replaced), but I’ve held myself back. I’ve asked people why, and I haven’t gotten a good answer." Concerning her reaction to the firing, she stated "it honestly hurts really deeply, because I really think I did nothing wrong. But in spite of the pain of it, which still lingers, I know that I contributed to some people suffering less."

She was awarded the Murrow Lifetime Achievement Award in 2022. In 2024, she received the Damon Runyon Award from the Denver Press Club.

== Career timeline ==
- 1978–1980: KTVL reporter
- 1980–1984: KGW reporter and anchor
- 1984–1990: KCBS reporter
- 1990–2015: NBC News
  - 1990–1991: NBC News Chicago bureau correspondent
  - 1991–1997: NBC News at Sunrise anchor
  - 1993–1995; 1996–1999: NBC Nightly News rotating Sunday anchor
  - 1996;1999; Weekend Today fill-in anchor
  - 1994–1997: Today substitute news anchor
  - 1997–2011: Today news anchor and substitute anchor
  - 2005–2007: Dateline NBC co-anchor
  - 2005–2011: NBC Nightly News substitute anchor
  - 2007–2008: Today 4th hour co-host (with Hoda Kotb and Natalie Morales)
  - 2007–2011: Dateline NBC anchor
  - 2011–2012: Today co-anchor
  - 2012–2015:
    - Today anchor-at-large
    - NBC News national and international correspondent
    - NBC News special anchor
- 2018–2019: PBS' We'll Meet Again docuseries
- 2019: TNT and TBS' Chasing the Cure

== Personal life ==
Curry was raised Catholic by her mother, who was a convert to the religion. Curry is married to Brian Ross, a software executive, whom she met in college. They have a daughter, McKenzie, and a son, William Walker Curry Ross. The family has lived in New Canaan, Connecticut as of 2013.

== Charitable work ==
- Multiple Myeloma Research Foundation
- Susan G. Komen Breast Cancer Foundation
- AmeriCares
- Save the Children
- Médecins Sans Frontières
- Airline Ambassadors International
- buildOn

== Awards and honors ==
- Emmy Awards, presented for coverage of the 1987 Los Angeles earthquake and for reporting on the explosion of a San Bernardino gas pipeline and a third in 2007 for her reporting on NBC Nightly News about the Darfur crisis.
- Golden Mike (four times), presented by Radio and Television News Association of Southern California
- Quinn Award, Los Angeles Press Club.
- Certificate of Excellence, Associated Press
- Gracie Award, presented by the Foundation of American Women in Radio and Television
- Excellence in Reporting, presented by the NAACP
- Vision Award, presented by the Asian American Journalists Association,
- Pioneer Award, presented by University of Oregon, 2003
- Truth in Media Award, presented by the Centre for Responsible Leadership
- Hall of Achievement induction, University of Oregon School of Journalism and Communication, 2002
- Common Wealth Award of Distinguished Service, presented by PNC Bank for outstanding achievements in mass communications, 2008
- Honorary Doctorate in Journalism from Southern Oregon University on May 6, 2010, after giving the commencement address
- Curry received an honorary degree from Providence College in Providence, Rhode Island on May 16, 2010.
- Curry received an honorary doctorate from Wheaton College in Norton, Massachusetts, on May 22, 2010, where she also delivered the keynote address to the graduating class. The address briefly gained national news attention as she cited several famous alumni in her speech, only one of whom had graduated from the college. All the other "alumni" had graduated from the Wheaton College in Illinois. Curry later apologized for the gaffe.
- Ann Curry Scholarship for University of Oregon School of Journalism and Communication Broadcasting Students, 2002
- Member of the board of directors of the International Women's Media Foundation
- Former member of the board of trustees of the University of Oregon
- Member of the board of the American Friends of Yahad-In Unum

== See also ==
- List of journalists in New York City
