= Edward Bennett Williams =

American trial lawyer and sports executive (1920–1988)

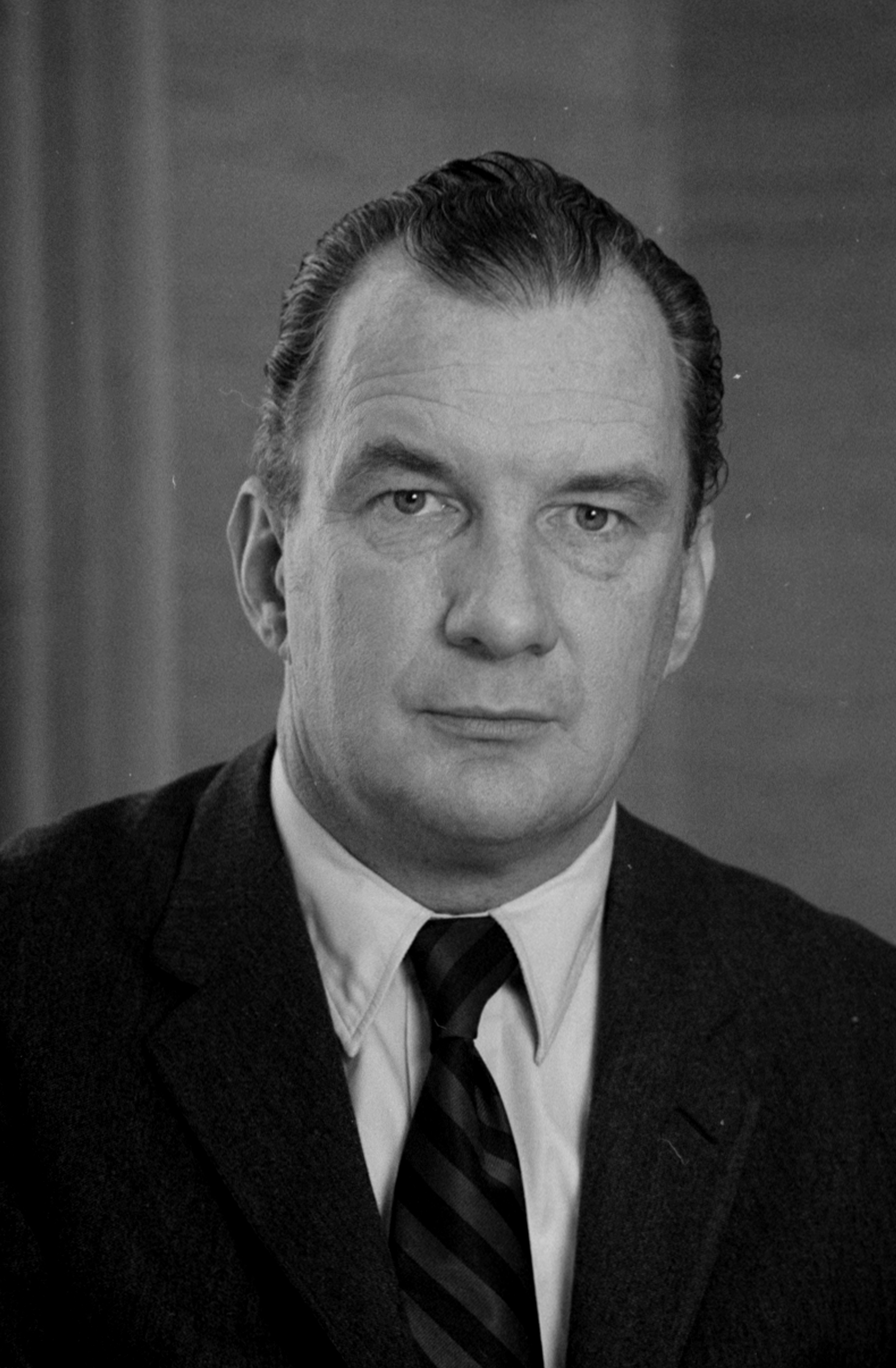
- Williams in 1970
- Born: May 31, 1920; Hartford, Connecticut, U.S.
- Died: August 13, 1988 (aged 68); Washington, D.C., U.S.
- Education: College of the Holy Cross (BA); Georgetown University (LLB)
- Occupations: Trial lawyer; defense attorney; sports team owner
- Organizations: Hogan & Hartson; Williams & Connolly
- Title: President of Washington Redskins (1966–1984); Owner of Baltimore Orioles (1979–1988)
- Political party: Democratic
- Spouses: Dorothy Adair Guider (m. 1946; died 1959); Agnes Anne Neill (m. 1960)

Treasurer of the Democratic National Committee
- In office October 18, 1974 – January 21, 1977
- Preceded by: Charles Peter McColough
- Succeeded by: Joel McCleary

Edward Bennett Williams (May 31, 1920 – August 13, 1988) was an American trial lawyer, sports executive, and political insider. During his career, he was one of the most prominent defense attorneys in the country, famous for his celebrity clientele and for winning prominent criminal cases which appeared hopeless.

After graduating first in his class from the College of the Holy Cross and Georgetown University Law School, Williams began his career as a trial lawyer for the law firm of Hogan & Hartson in Washington, D.C., beginning in 1944. He established his own criminal law practice in 1949 and soon rose to prominence for his representation of mobsters, labor unionists, and public officials. During the 1950s and 1960s, he served as defense counsel to U.S. senator Joseph McCarthy and Hollywood producers, and won acquittals for union leader Jimmy Hoffa, congressman Adam Clayton Powell Jr., and U.S. treasury secretary John Connally in bribery and tax evasion cases.

During trials, Williams was known for colorful, dramatic defenses of his clients which often captured national media attention. He was particularly praised for his use of expert witnesses, and summoned testimonies from figures including Lady Bird Johnson, Dean Rusk, Robert McNamara, and Billy Graham. In 1967, he founded his own law firm, Williams & Connolly, then, from 1974 to 1977, served as treasurer of the Democratic National Committee, which he had previously represented in its 1972 lawsuit against President Richard Nixon for Nixon's role in the Watergate scandal.

Despite being an influential public figure, Williams never served in public office and rejected an offer from President Lyndon B. Johnson to serve as Mayor of Washington, and rejected subsequent offers from Gerald Ford and Ronald Reagan to serve as Director of Central Intelligence. Outside of his legal practice, he was involved in professional sports. He served as controlling owner of the Washington Redskins of the National Football League (NFL) from 1965 to 1979 and was its president from 1966 to 1984. He later owned the Baltimore Orioles of Major League Baseball (MLB) from 1979 until his death in 1988.

== Early life and education ==
Williams was born in Hartford, Connecticut, on May 31, 1920, to Joseph Barnard Williams, a floorwalker in a department store, and Mary Bennett. His paternal grandfather, James, was a Welsh immigrant who converted to Catholicism and worked in an iron foundry. On his mother's side, Williams was descended from immigrant Irish dairy farmers. His parents married late and lived in a double-decker house; at the time of his birth, his mother was 44 years old. Because Bennett's next child was stillborn, Williams was raised an only child.

Williams spent his early childhood in Hartford, where he later recalled that, at the age of five, he resolved to become a lawyer after witnessing the trial of the gang criminal Gerald Chapman at the city's courthouse. David Rosen, an elementary school classmate and friend, remembered Williams as "quiet" and "very studious" as a child. According to Williams' biographer, Evan Thomas, his cousins remembered him as "soft-spoken and bashful in an engaging sort of way." A classmate, Charles Buck, remembered him as: "the most premeditated kid I've ever seen. He thought everything out, what he was going to do, how he was going to do it." A former girlfriend, Jerry Waterhouse, recalled:

Ed was very bright. He was not studious. He was just a quick study. If he hadn’t done any Latin translation, I could walk down the corridor and read him the translation and he could pick it up just like that. I’d spend an hour and a half studying it, but in five minutes he could remember every word I'd said. It’s just incredible. He’s been like that ever since I’ve known him, and I’ve known him since he was thirteen years old.

At an early age, Williams developed an interest in gambling and, when he was eight years old, began playing a numbers game betting on the balance of the U.S. Treasury, which would appear in the local evening newspaper. He attended Bulkeley High School, where he became president of its student council, class speaker, debate treasurer, and the winner of a prize for excellence in English. He recalled later that "at high school I practically ran the place," and the school's 1937 yearbook wrote that, "he always ruled with an iron hand and dominating will...and for this reason accomplished much." Williams, who wore a suit and tie to school everyday, became the editor-in-chief of the student newspaper, The Torch, in which he had his own column, titled "Inside Stuff." For his dedication to reporting gossip, he was nicknamed "Walter Winchell" by fellow classmates.

When his father lost his job during the Great Depression, Williams began working as a gas jockey. His hours working at the gas station and maintaining The Torch took a toll on his academics, and Williams, although aided by his photographic memory, lost a potential scholarship to Yale University to another student. After graduating high school in 1937 at age 17, he was awarded a scholarship to nearby Trinity College, but chose instead to enroll at the College of the Holy Cross in Worcester, Massachusetts, where he had won a full academic scholarship.

=== Holy Cross and Georgetown, 1937–1944 ===
As an undergraduate at Holy Cross, Williams was "a relentless grind" who rose early to study, vowed not to drink or smoke, and was a member of a section of students who were placed on an accelerated curriculum. He later recalled that the college's professors "drove us like hell, absolutely beyond anything I’ve ever been driven in my life. We never had any time off. We worked all the time, seven days a week, around the clock. It was just brutal." The curriculum included the Jesuit ratio studiorum and stressed the study of logic, apologetics, rhetoric, metaphysics, and epistemology. Williams studied orators including Cicero, Demosthenes, Edmund Burke, and William Pitt, and translated the satires of the Roman poet Juvenal from the Latin originals. He particularly admired Daniel Webster and Henry Clay. He was a distinguished debater at Holy Cross, helping to defeat Harvard College in a debate tournament his senior year, and ran a debate team with a fellow sectionmate, William J. Richardson. Richardson recalled that Williams "had a corkscrew mind" and "would bore in on a sinuous or tortuous argument." In his senior year, Williams wrote a prize-winning essay titled Towards the True Norm of Morality which called for "absolute standards for evaluating human acts."

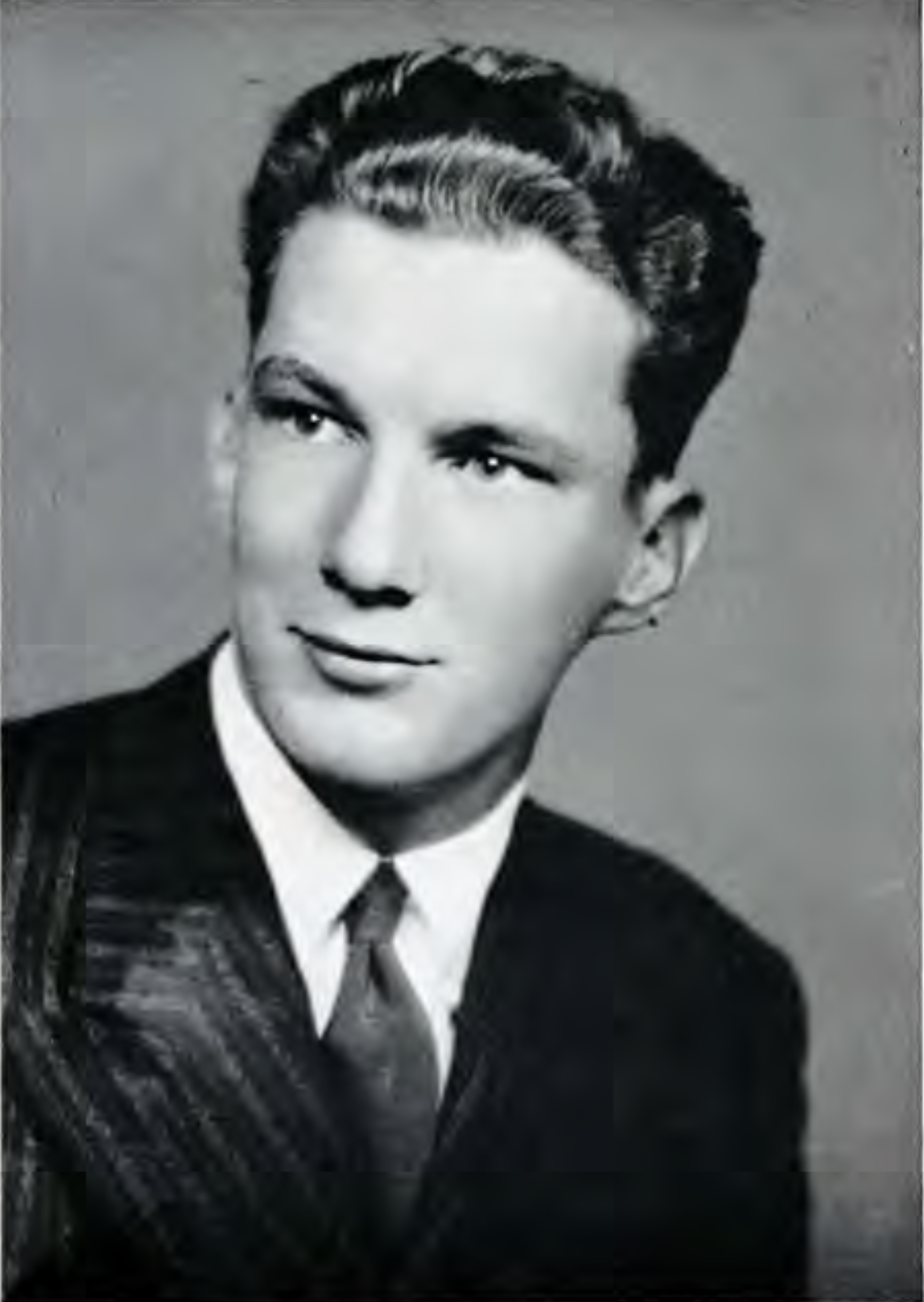
Williams as a senior at the College of the Holy Cross, 1941

Although he initially struggled academically in his first two years, Williams graduated summa cum laude from Holy Cross in 1941, ranked first in his class, and attained a score of 97 out of 100 in his bachelor's oral exam. Classmates voted him "most learned." He won full scholarships to the Columbus School of Law and to the Georgetown University Law School, in addition to being awarded a partial scholarship to attend Yale Law School. Because of Yale's cost, he chose Georgetown, but took a leave from law school after the Attack on Pearl Harbor. On December 19, 1941, he applied to be a clerk at the Federal Bureau of Investigation (FBI). Despite the bureau’s examiner rating him as "undoubtedly above average intelligence," he was rejected for being "too smart aleckie." He instead enlisted in the United States Army Air Corps, completed training at Maxwell Air Force Base, and graduated from preflight school in April 1942. In 1943, however, he was medically discharged after suffering back injuries in a training plane crash.

Williams re-enrolled at Georgetown in June 1943. But before he had finished law school or even took the bar exam, he began working in the summer of 1944 as a law clerk for the leading Washington law firm Hogan & Hartson, whose chief trial lawyer Howard Boyd had picked Williams "on the spot" after Georgetown professor Al Philip Kane recommended him as his "brightest student." In the fall of that same year, Williams graduated first in his class from Georgetown, was admitted to the bar, and began trial work at Hogan & Hartson under Boyd's guidance as the firm's youngest employee, at just 24 years old.

== Early practice and marriage, 1944–1949 ==
As a young trial attorney at Hogan & Hartson working closely with Boyd, Williams primarily focused on personal injury law. Boyd later said, "it was perfectly apparent from his first identification with the Hogan office that he was going to be a leader in his field." In one joint case, Boyd and Williams defended a streetcar company whose best witness had been killed in World War II before the case had went to trial. To replace the witness' testimony, the two called to testify a Hogan & Hartson investigator, "Pop" Martin, who had obtained a statement from the witness before his death, and, on examination, led the investigator to say, in a dramatic tone, that the witness had "gave his life for his country." Despite being reprimanded by the judge for the move, they won the case. In another early case with Boyd, they represented a man who sued a Washington hotel after a chair he was sitting in collapsed. Boyd considered an offer to settle the case for $10,000, but, at Williams' insistence, they went to trial instead, winning a judgement of $15,000 (equivalent to $274,338 in 2025). Boyd recalled:

Somehow or other, Ed got hold of the chair and during the course of his argument to the jury he would pick it up a certain way and the thing would fall apart with a great clamor and then crash down on the floor in front of the jury. Ed, with pretended embarrassment, would pick it up and put it back together. I think it happened several times. That was Ed’s style. He was just effective at capturing the attention of the jury.

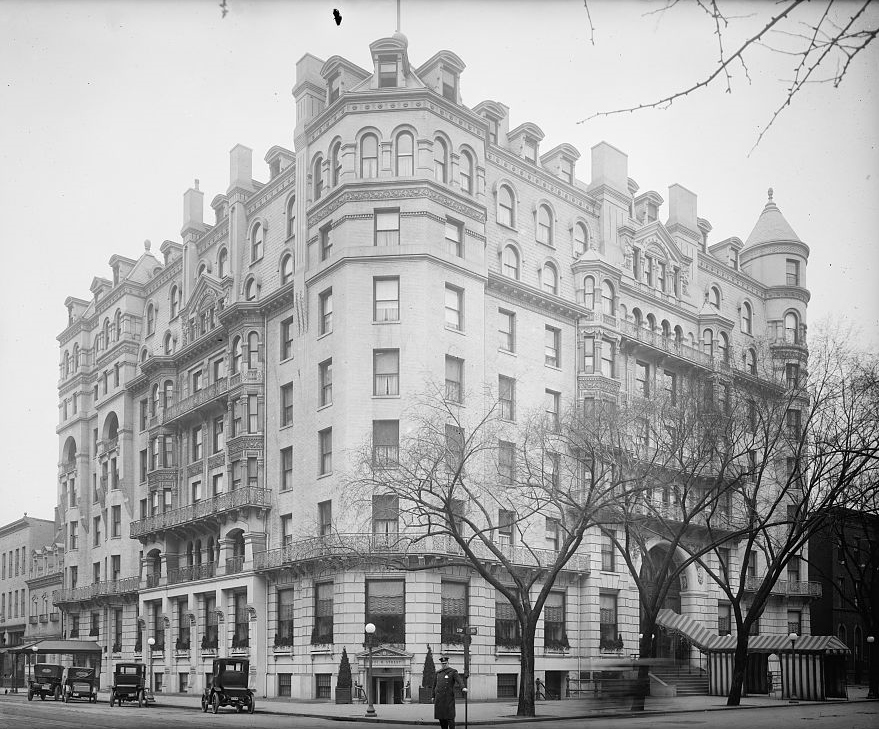
Williams married Dorothy Guider, granddaughter of Frank J. Hogan and a graduate of Smith College five years his junior, after their first meeting at the Shoreham Hotel (pictured 1916)

Over time, as Williams gained more experience, he began handling cases alone without Boyd's supervision. His first solo case at the firm concerned a bicyclist who was sued for colliding with a pedestrian, with Williams representing the cyclist. He won the case—along with $500 (equivalent to $9,144.61 in 2025) in damages—by choosing to countersue the pedestrian for obstructing the cyclist's way. In another case, he represented the Capital Transit Company against a woman, Ella Thomas, who claimed she had been injured in a minor bus collision and began experiencing extreme fevers in the hospital as a result. Williams, after spending an entire night examining her hospital records, found that she had been spiking her thermometer readings by placing them in a cup of hot water; under pressure from him during cross-examination, Thomas broke down and admitted to doing so in court. Her case was dismissed.

Williams' abilities at trial brought him the attention of local Washington lawyers, who, along with local law students, began gathering for a chance to see Williams with Boyd at court. As described by Boyd, Williams' style was aggressive to an extreme. Williams could not accept defeat if he lossed and insisted on appealing if he did. In a case where he represented a department store against a woman who sought damages for sitting on a stool with no seat, Williams lost at trial, convinced the store's insurance company to endure the cost of appealing, lost the appeal, insisted on appealing for a second time (doing so pro bono), then finally won, depriving the woman of her damages. he had 7 kids 3 from his 1st wife and 4 from his 2nd

Had it not been for Ed Williams leaving the firm, I may not have had the opportunity to go to [Hogan & Hartson], and it may have resulted in my not ever being appointed to the bench.

— John Sirica

In the winter of 1946, Vera Hartson, the wife of Hogan & Hartson's name partner Nelson T. Hartson, introduced Williams to Dorothy Guider, the favorite granddaughter of the firm's founder Frank J. Hogan, at the Shoreham Hotel. After a day's courtship, Williams proposed to Guider that very same evening, and she accepted. They married on May 3, 1946, at a Catholic church in Washington, D.C. By the time of the wedding, Williams was, despite only a year of private practice, a considerably successful lawyer; as a member of the firm's litigation department, he won thirteen out of his fifteen cases, with one ending in mistrial. His salary, which had rose to $5,000 a year, was a comfortable sum at the time for a childless Washington couple. But not wanting to rely on his in-law's business doing personal injury cases, he resigned from the firm three years later in the spring of 1949 to pursue his own legal venture, a choice which the Hogans supported. Williams' position was filled by his close friend John Sirica, who later became a federal appellate judge.

== Trial lawyer, 1949–1988 ==
In March 1949, Williams opened a new law firm, Chase & Williams, in the ten-story Hill Building in downtown Washington. His partner, Nicholas Chase, was a protégé of William E. Leahy, a leading trial lawyer and graduate of Holy Cross and Georgetown who Williams considered a role model. The office began small, comprising a room each for Williams and Chase and one for reception. Robert Chestney, one of the firm's law clerks, recalled that the two partners "couldn’t agree on anything, not even whether to close the door or not. They were always at odds. I think they were too much alike, they were both headliners." The sociable and ambitious Williams, who frequented Washington nightlife and joined the exclusive all-male Metropolitan Club, chased media publicity, often by seeking high-profile cases that involved members of the city's criminal underground. In early 1950, he obtained the legal file of the deported Italian gangster Lucky Luciano—who was seeking a lawyer that could return him to the U.S.—and pressed Chase to take on Luciano's case, which Chase rejected as "doubtfully moral." In the summer of 1950, they dissolved their partnership over disagreements about the firm's direction.

=== Pearson and McCarthy ===
Just before the firm's dissolution, however, Williams had received his first major case involving a nationally-prominent client dealing with the news media. On May 21, 1950, muckraking columnist Drew Pearson accused Norman Littell, a former U.S. assistant attorney general, of aiding the efforts of "the communist Polish embassy" to cover up the escape of Gerhart Eisler, a "top communist" in the U.S. who had fled to Poland two weeks earlier. Pearson announced on his radio show that day that Littell had ties with a "government which does not believe in letting democracy live." On the recommendation of Nelson T. Hartson, the co-founder of Hogan & Hartson and an "old friend," Littell hired Williams as his attorney to defend him, and Williams subsequently filed a $300,000 defamation suit against Pearson. A few months later, Williams became involved in a second high-profile Pearson-related case. On December 12, 1950, Pearson was unexpectedly attacked at a Sulgrave Club party by U.S. senator Joseph McCarthy, who, having said earlier that he planned to "put Pearson out of business," violently assaulted the journalist in his head and groin until being stopped by Senator Richard Nixon. The incident dominated headlines for days. When Pearson subsequently sued McCarthy for $5.1 million for combined assault, defamation, antitrust, and conspiracy, McCarthy chose the 30-year-old Williams for his case.

Williams just destroyed them. He was so clearly better prepared, so much more capable of orchestrating jury response, that he just ran all over them.

— Warren Woods, Pearson's attorney during the Littell case

Pearson, who had previously been sued hundreds of times for libel, had at that point a perfect winning record in libel cases. But when his wife, Luvie, saw Williams' opening remarks on the first day of the Littell trial, she said to him, "You know, Drew, we’ve lost.” Pearson's case against Littell finally reached its end in May 1953, when the jury found Pearson guilty and awarded $50,000 in damages to Littell—the only libel loss in Pearson's career. During the trial, Williams obtained a previously-undisclosed FBI file on Pearson which had been leaked. According to biographer Oliver Pilat, "Littell had promised not to publicize the FBI file on Pearson, but Edward Bennett Williams considered it too precious to waste," and Williams brandished the FBI file in front of a key witness "to jog the memory of the witness and discourage any attempt to conceal Pearson’s trickery." A subsequent FBI investigation into how Williams obtained Pearson's file was dismissed when Williams revealed that it was the president, Harry Truman, who provided it to him.

In McCarthy's case, Williams quickly became one of the senator's closest advisors, assuming control over not simply his defense against Pearson, but also in representing the senator in a libel lawsuit against Senator William Benton of Connecticut and in a complex and protracted Internal Revenue Service (IRS) tax suit. McCarthy initially represented himself in his suit against Benton but blundered his deposition and hired Williams to take over. Williams was able to resolve McCarthy's tax issues with the IRS by proving that McCarthy had overpaid, rather than underpaid, his taxes, and ultimately, in 1956, convinced Pearson to drop his case against McCarthy entirely.

=== Hollywood ===
Williams (third from right) with humorist Art Buchwald at a party, 1950s

Because of his association with McCarthy, Williams was shielded from most of the red-baiting during the height of the Second Red Scare, allowing him to defend victims of McCarthyism who could not readily find defense counsel during the scare. In the summer of 1951, screenwriter Martin Berkeley hired Williams to serve as his counsel during his hearing before the House Un-American Activities Committee (HUAC) on September 19, 1951. Berkeley had been outed by Richard Collins as a member of the Communist Party of America (CPUSA) when Collins testified before the same committee a year earlier. In his voluntary testimony to the HUAC, however, Berkeley—with Williams alongside him—shocked the committee by naming more than 100 Hollywood businesspeople he believed to have been communists from 1936 to 1943, the period in which he was a CPUSA member. Six days later, screenwriter Sidney Buchman, one of those outed by Berkeley, testified before the HUAC but was indicted for Contempt of Congress for refusing to answer questions. Buchman hired Williams as his defense attorney but nevertheless was fined $150 and placed on one year's probation. On March 23, 1953, Williams represented before HUAC another Hollywood producer outed by Berkeley, Harold Hecht, who afterwards offered him a 10 percent share in his film company Hecht-Hill-Lancaster (shared with Burt Lancaster), but Williams turned the offer down.

In his Hollywood cases, Williams became particularly adept at winning for clients "clearance"—assurances that they would not be placed on anti-communist blacklists such as Red Channels. In May 1953, Williams obtained clearance for Hollywood giant Robert Rossen, who in return gave Williams a share of his 1961 movie The Hustler, and 10 percent of his 1956 film Alexander the Great. Williams also helped the screenwriter Howard Koch, a co-writer of the 1941 film Casablanca, obtain clearance; when one network still tried to blacklist Kohn, Williams wrote to it, "My client, Howard Koch, is off your list or we sue you for a million dollars," and a day later Kohn was delisted.

=== Law and politics ===
Williams represented many high-profile clients, including Sam Giancana, John Hinckley Jr., Frank Sinatra, former Governor of Texas and Secretary of the Treasury John B. Connally Jr., financier Robert Vesco, Playboy publisher Hugh Hefner, Jimmy Hoffa, organized crime figure Frank Costello, oil commodity trader Marc Rich, U.S. Senator Joseph McCarthy, corporate raider Victor Posner, Michael Milken, The Washington Post newspaper, the Reverend Sun Myung Moon, former CIA director Richard Helms, Bobby Baker, various FBI agents accused of bag jobs in New York, and Aldo Icardi, an OSS agent accused of killing his commander. He also defended Jack Ruby, the assassin of Lee Harvey Oswald.

Williams was both a friend of and lawyer for Senator Joseph McCarthy. They first met before McCarthy gained notoriety during the House Un-American Activities Committee proceedings. He represented McCarthy in a variety of cases, including in his libel suit against Senator William Benton and in his legal dispute with the IRS over underpaid taxes. He continued to represent him during the committee hearings which led to his formal censure by the US Senate.

In June 1956, Williams was hired by mobster Frank Costello in his tax evasion and denaturalization cases. He succeeded in getting Costello released from prison on a $20,000 bail. However, he was unsuccessful in his attempts to overturn Costello's tax evasion conviction.

In May 1957, Williams was hired by the President of the International Brotherhood of Teamsters Dave Beck to advise him during his testimony before the US Senate's McClellan Committee on organized crime within the trade unions. Williams won an acquittal for then-Vice President of the Teamsters Jimmy Hoffa in his 1957 bribery trial. This came as a surprise, as Hoffa was expected to be convicted. Afterwards, he was made general counsel for the Teamsters and kept on a $50,000 per annum retainer. He was portrayed by José Ferrer in the 1983 television film Blood Feud.

Williams defended Bernard Goldfine when he was investigated for his expensive gifts to Sherman Adams, the White House Chief of Staff who resigned due to the fallout from the public disclosure. In 1959, Vito Genovese, the boss of the Genovese crime family in New York, was sentenced to 15 years in prison. When the Supreme Court declined to review his case he hired Williams. In October 1963, Williams appeared before the Court of Appeals, which rejected his appeal.

In 1965, Sam Giancana hired Williams for his summoning before a grand jury that was probing organized crime in Chicago. Against Williams' advice, Giancana refused to testify and was prosecuted for contempt of court. Giancana did not believe he would be prosecuted as he had helped the CIA in their attempts to assassinate Cuban leader Fidel Castro. Another Chicago mafia client of Williams was Felix Alderisio, who he defended during his extortion trial. In 1967, he represented Lyndon B. Johnson's aide Bobby Baker, who was convicted of larceny, fraud and tax evasion, being sentenced to one-to-three years in prison. A subsequent 1970 appeal was unsuccessful. Williams represented Baker's friend Ed Levinson, a gambling operator in Las Vegas, when he was charged with evading taxes owed on profit he had skimmed from his Fremont casino. The FBI had wiretapped his phone and in response he sued the bureau for invasion of privacy, seeking $4.5 million. Williams worked out an arrangement whereby Levinson would drop his suit in exchange for being able to plead nolo contendere and fined a minimum of $5,000.

In April 1968, he appeared in a CBS news special, The Trial Lawyer, alongside his fellow lawyers Melvin Belli, F. Lee Bailey, and Percy Foreman, where they discussed the merits and demerits of trial by jury. In 1975, Williams successfully defended the former governor of Texas, John B. Connally, when he was put on trial for bribery relating to a milk company's contributions to Richard Nixon's re-election campaign. Connally was acquitted. He defended CIA director Dick Helms when he was brought to trial for misleading the Senate Foreign Relations Committee. Williams arranged a deal whereby Helms would enter a no contest plea in return for avoiding jail time. Helms received a two-year suspended sentence and a $2,000 fine.

Williams established his own law firm, Williams & Connolly, in 1967 with Paul Connolly. He served as treasurer of the Democratic National Committee from October 18, 1974, to January 21, 1977.

Williams served on the board of the 1976 iteration of the Committee on the Present Danger. He was a member of the Foreign Intelligence Advisory Board under presidents Gerald Ford and Ronald Reagan.

=== Professional sports ===
==== Washington Redskins ====
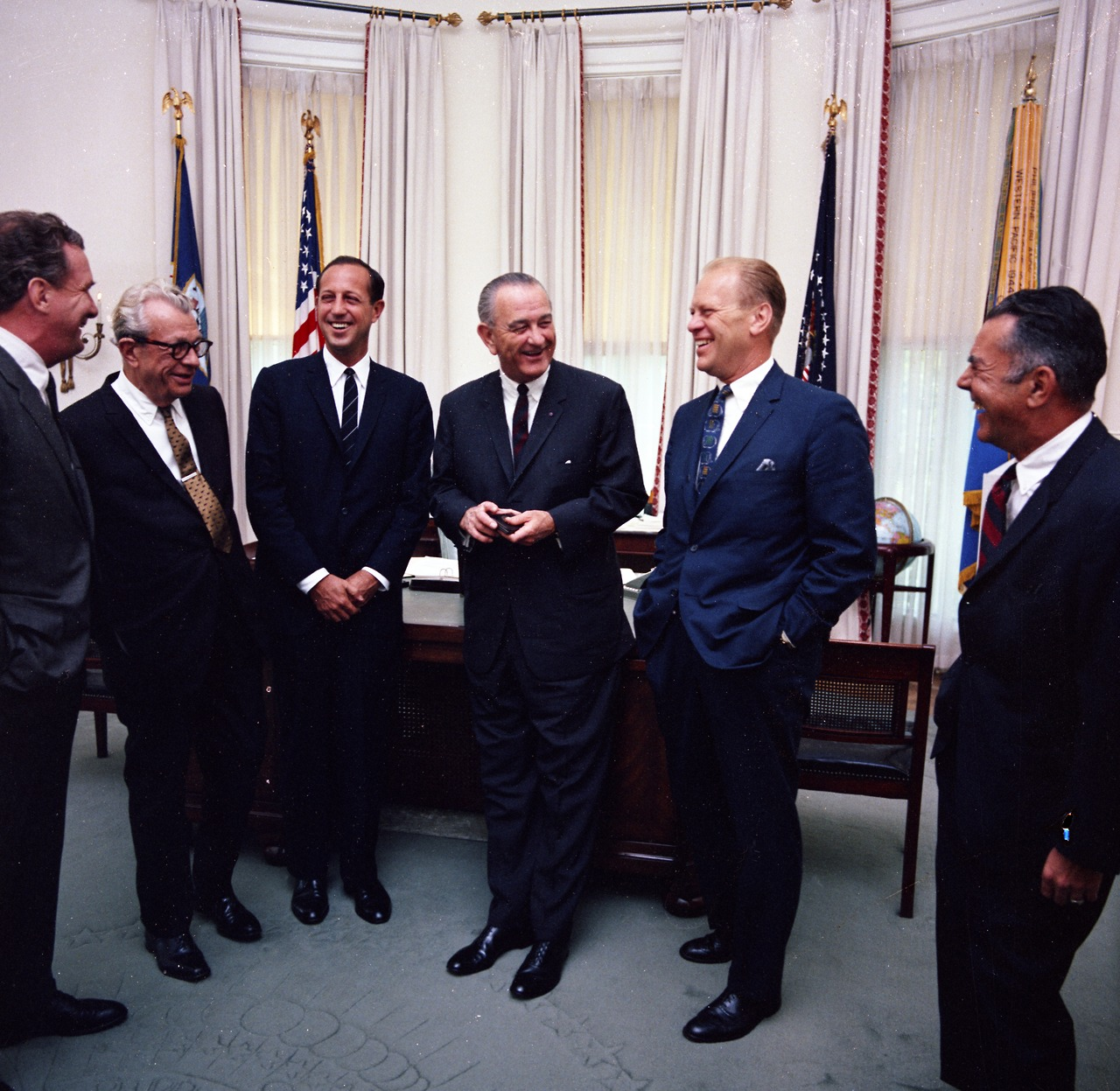
Williams (first from left) with NFL commissioner Pete Rozelle while meeting congressmen with President Lyndon B. Johnson, 1967

Williams acquired a five percent share in the Washington Redskins in 1962. In 1965, he was appointed by team owner George Preston Marshall to run daily operations and was named team president the following year. Williams acquired Marshall's shares in the franchise following his death in 1969. As owner, Williams spent heavily on appointing high-profile coaches and general managers, beginning with Otto Graham in 1966 and continuing with Vince Lombardi in 1969, George Allen in 1971, and Bobby Beathard in 1978. In 1974, Williams sold majority interest in the team to Redskins minority partner Jack Kent Cooke. Due to NFL rules at the time disallowing controlling ownership in other leagues, Cooke allowed Williams to continue operating the team until selling his other properties, the NBA's Los Angeles Lakers and the NHL's Los Angeles Kings, to Jerry Buss in May 1979. Williams remained with the Redskins as its president until selling his remaining shares to Cooke in 1985.

==== Baltimore Orioles ====
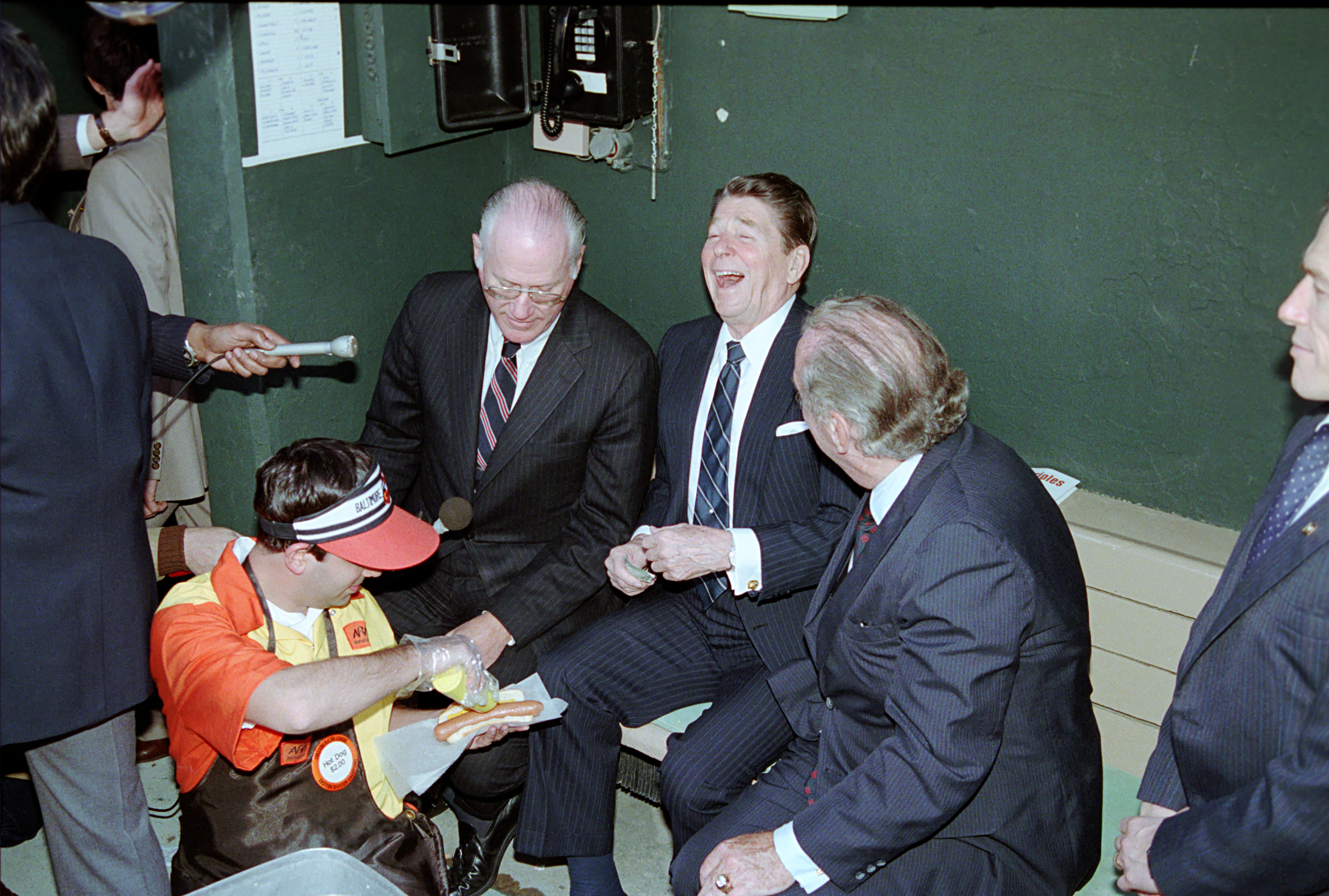
Williams (second from right) with MLB commissioner Bowie Kuhn and President Ronald Reagan, 1984

Williams purchased controlling interest in the Baltimore Orioles of Major League Baseball (MLB) from Jerold Hoffberger for $12 million on August 2, 1979, with the transaction being approved unanimously by American League team owners 11 1/2 weeks later on October 22. His interest in purchasing the franchise began when he represented in negotiations William E. Simon, who had attempted to do the same thing earlier that year until he withdrew his offer on February 5. As part of the deal, Williams bought a block of publicly traded shares that had been issued in 1936 when the team was still the St. Louis Browns, making the Orioles privately held once again.

Many feared Williams would move the team to Washington. Baltimore had previously lost the Baltimore Bullets basketball team to Washington. The fear of Williams's moving the team increased with the 1984 departure of the Baltimore Colts. However, Williams did not move the team. More importantly, Williams signed a new, long-term lease with Baltimore that would pay for a new stadium, which would become Oriole Park at Camden Yards. He would not live to see the new ballpark (it opened in 1992, four years after his death). The Orioles were sold by Williams's widow Agnes to Eli Jacobs, Larry Lucchino, and Sargent and Bobby Shriver for $70 million (equivalent to $190.6 million in 2025) on December 5, 1988.

=== Real estate investments ===
Among Williams's many real estate holdings was The Jefferson, a 98-room luxury hotel located near the White House and favored by many sport and political figures in the 1980 and 90s. In April 1989, Paine Webber Realty (a subsidiary of Paine Webber) purchased the hotel from Agnes Williams for $28 million, equivalent to $72.7 million in 2025.

== Death ==
Williams died at Georgetown University Hospital on August 13, 1988, after a 12-year battle with colon cancer. He was buried in St. Gabriel Cemetery in Potomac, Maryland. His funeral was attended by most of Washington's power elite, including then-U.S. vice president George H. W. Bush, Supreme Court Justice Thurgood Marshall, baseball legend Joe DiMaggio, boxing champion Sugar Ray Leonard, NFL commissioner Pete Rozelle, Eunice Kennedy and Sargent Shriver, and Michael Milken (of the famous 1980s junk-bond scandal). The Edward Bennett Williams Law Library at the Georgetown University Law Center is named in his honor. The senior apartments residence hall at the College of the Holy Cross is also named after him.
