= Christine Warnke =

Dr. Christine Warnke

Personal details
- Born: Christine M. Warnke Washington, D.C., U.S.
- Party: Democratic
- Education: University of Maryland

Christine M. Warnke is a senior vice president at Capitol Hill Consulting Group in Washington, D.C., and a local talk show host. She is an at-large member of the District of Columbia Democratic State Committee. Previously, she was a lawyer at Hogan Lovells.

== Early years and education ==
Warnke graduated from the University of Maryland, College Park in 1975. She earned a doctoral degree at UMD’s public health school in 1993. In 2005, she was awarded the university's Outstanding Alumnus Award.

== Political career ==
From 1996 to 1998, she chaired the D.C. Commission for Women and was reappointed by Mayor Anthony A. Williams in 2002. She was one of Mayor Adrian Fenty's four appointments to the D.C. Humanities Council. In April 2014, Warnke was elected to a city-wide DC Democratic State Committee position.

In 2012 Warnke was appointed chair of the White House Project to advance Women's Leadership in Washington DC.

== Awards and recognition ==
- 1994 Confirmed by Senate as member of the board of directors of the National Institute of Building Sciences
- 1999 Ellis Island Medal of Honor
- 2004 Opportunities Industrialization Centers International, Leon Sullivan Outstanding Achievement Award
- 2002 Daughters of Penelope, Women of the Year Award
- 2005 University of Maryland Distinguished Alumnus award, Public Health & Human Performance
- 2009 Gusi Peace Prize Laureate in Economics and Humanitarianism
- 2013 Tuskegee Airmen Award during the Presidential Inauguration of 2013

== Active association positions ==
- December 2014 Commissioner for the Real Estate Commission of the District of Columbia
- Founding President of the Hellenic American Women's Council
- Board member of the National Museum of African Art
- Board member for Friend of the Children of Angola and Human Trafficking Foundation
- Board Member of Airline Ambassadors International
- Advisory Board member of the Euclid Financial Group
- Member at large committeewoman
