= Cole Finegan =

American lawyer (born 1956)

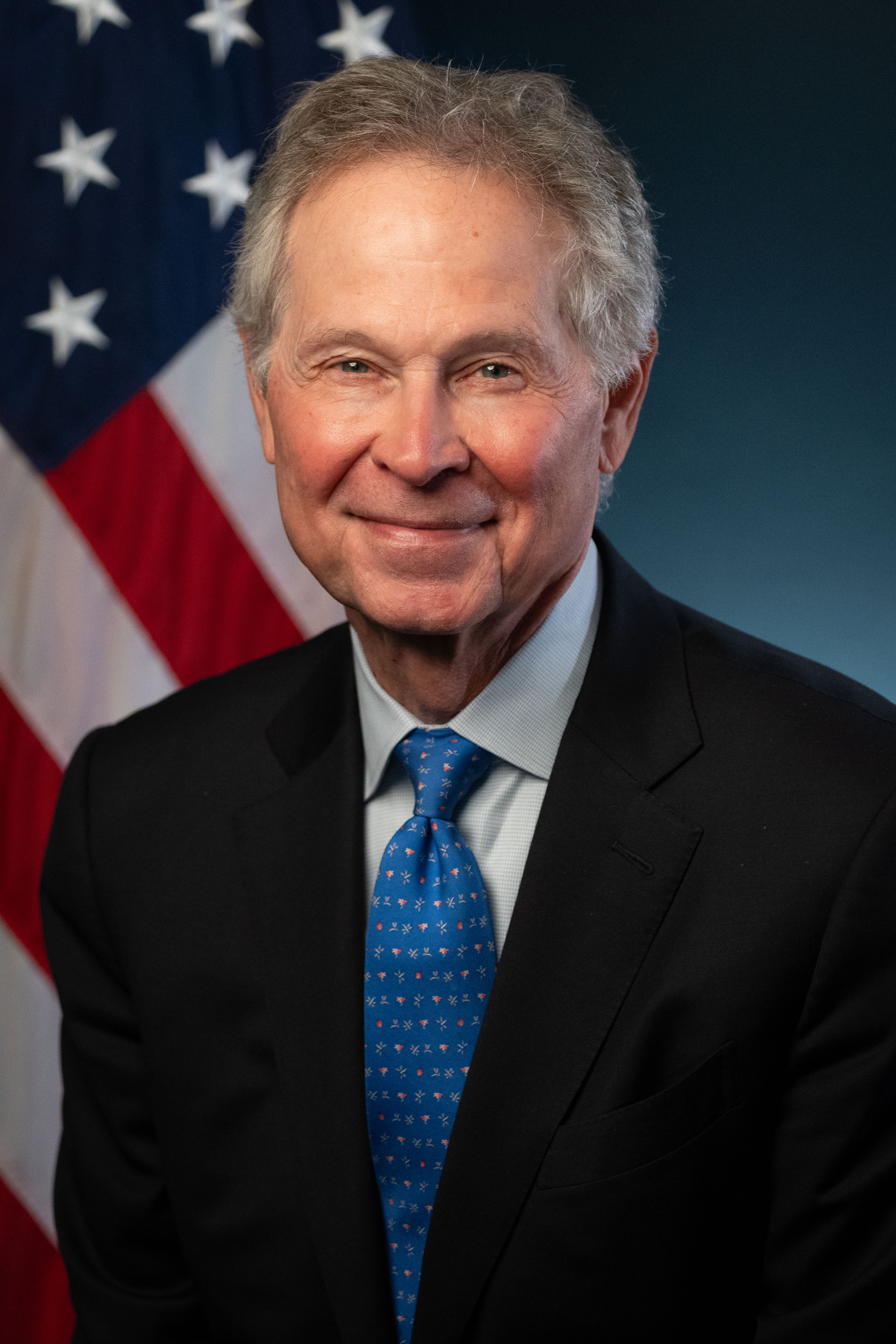

United States Attorney for the District of Colorado
- In office December 1, 2021 – May 31, 2024
- Appointed by: Joe Biden
- Preceded by: Jason R. Dunn; Matthew T. Kirsch (acting)
- Succeeded by: Matthew T. Kirsch (acting)

Personal details
- Born: Philip Cole Finegan II; 1956 (age 69–70) Tulsa, Oklahoma, U.S.
- Education: University of Notre Dame (BA); Georgetown University (JD)

Philip Cole Finegan II (born 1956) is an American lawyer who served as the United States attorney for the District of Colorado from 2021 to 2024. He served as Denver's city attorney and chief of staff to then Denver mayor John Hickenlooper from 2003 through 2006. He was also the regional managing partner of the Americas for Hogan Lovells and managing partner of the law firm's Denver office.

== Early life and education ==
Finegan was born in Tulsa, Oklahoma, and attended Cascia Hall Preparatory School. He attended the University of Notre Dame from 1974 to 1978, earning a degree in English. After graduating, Finegan worked full-time as chief legislative assistant and then chief of staff to U.S. Representative James R. Jones of Oklahoma, chair of the House Budget Committee. While working, Finegan also attended Georgetown University Law Center and graduated in 1986. He served as a member of The Tax Lawyer law review.

== Political career ==
While working for U.S. Representative James R. Jones, Finegan managed his 1984 re-election and his bid for the U.S. Senate in 1986. Finegan was campaign manager for mayoral candidate Norm Early, who lost the 1991 election to Wellington Webb. From 1991 to 1993, Finegan served both as chief legal counsel and director of policy and initiatives for Colorado Governor Roy Romer.

From 2003 through 2006, Finegan served as Denver's city attorney and as chief of staff to mayor John Hickenlooper. He also served as finance chair for Bennet's 2016 re-election campaign and was a co-chair of Hickenlooper's re-election campaign. He was one of four Colorado finance co-chairs for President Barack Obama's 2012 re-election campaign.

=== U.S. Attorney for the District of Colorado ===
On September 28, 2021, President Joe Biden nominated Finegan to be the United States attorney for the District of Colorado. On November 4, 2021, his nomination was reported out of committee by voice vote. On November 19, 2021, his nomination was confirmed by the United States Senate via voice vote. He was sworn into office on December 1, 2021, by Judge Christine Arguello. He resigned on May 31, 2024, to return to the private sector.

== Legal career ==
=== Brownstein Hyatt Farber ===
Tom Strickland and Andy Loewi recruited Finegan in early 1987 to join Brownstein Hyatt Farber Schreck (then Brownstein Hyatt Farber & Madden), a national law firm based in Denver. From 1993 to 2003, Finegan was a partner in the Denver office and advised on land use, regulatory, municipal, legislative, and election law.

=== Hogan Lovells ===
Finegan joined Hogan Lovells (then Hogan & Hartson) in 2007 as a partner. He became managing partner of Hogan Lovells' Denver office in May 2007, and focused his practice on public-private partnerships, regulatory issues, land use and development, and legislative and public policy law. In May 2013, Finegan was elected to the Hogan Lovells board as the representative for the Americas. From 2014 to 2020, Finegan served as the managing partner for the Americas for Hogan Lovells.

Finegan was selected as a "Lawyer of the Decade" by Law Week Colorado; as Lawyer of the Year 2013; and was also named one of the most influential people in Denver by 5280 magazine.

=== The Anschutz Corporation ===
Finegan is executive vice president and general counsel of The Anschutz Corporation.

== Affiliations ==
Finegan chaired the board of directors of the Downtown Denver Partnership, and served on the board for Metro Denver Chamber of Commerce, The Children's Hospital, The Denver Foundation, Colorado Black Chamber of Commerce, and Teach for America. He also served as a member of the Colorado Forum and Quarterly Forum.

Finegan also served on the board for Denver Public Schools Foundation board of directors and is also a past member of the Colorado I Have A Dream Foundation. the Legal Aid Foundation of Colorado board of directors, In the higher education sphere, he served on the State Board of Agriculture, the State Board of Colleges, and the Auraria Higher Education Center board.
