= Jason R. Dunn =

American lawyer

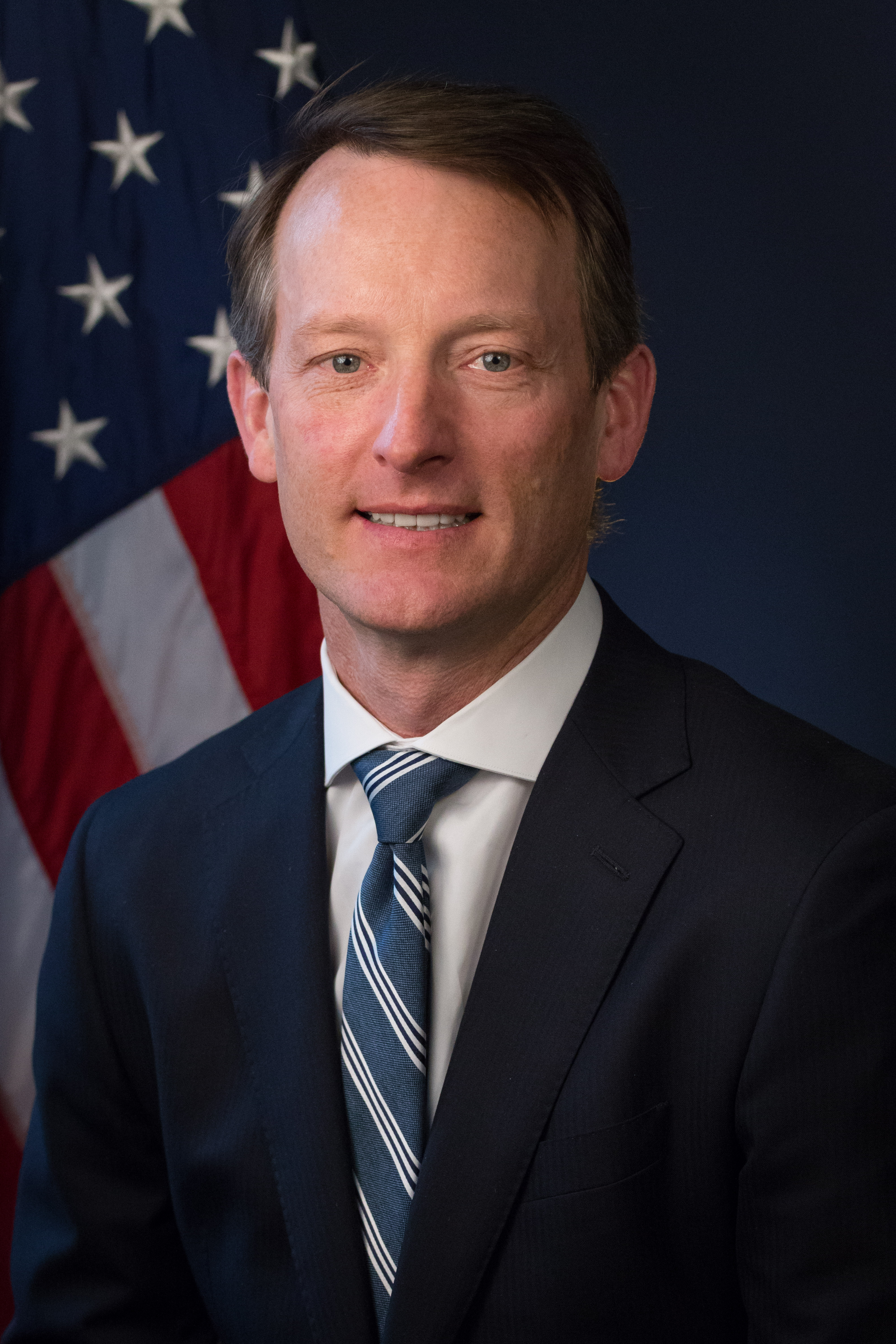

United States Attorney for the District of Colorado
- In office October 26, 2018 – February 28, 2021
- President: Donald Trump; Joe Biden
- Preceded by: Robert Troyer
- Succeeded by: Cole Finegan

Personal details
- Born: Colorado, U.S.
- Education: University of Colorado (BS, MPA, JD)

Jason R. Dunn is an American attorney, who served as the United States Attorney for the District of Colorado from 2018 to 2021. He was previously an attorney in private practice in the Denver office of Brownstein Hyatt Farber Schreck.

== Early life and education ==
Dunn was born and raised in Colorado, the son of a teacher and school administrator. Dunn earned his Bachelor of Science from the University of Colorado Boulder in 2001, Master of Public Administration from the University of Colorado Denver in 1998, and Juris Doctor from the University of Colorado Law School in 1993.

== Career ==
After graduating from law school, he was a law clerk for then Justice Nathan B. Coats of the Colorado Supreme Court. He previously served as Deputy Attorney General under Colorado Attorney General John Suthers, helping manage an office of over 250 lawyers and shaping Colorado's legal strategy in national and state litigation.

He was a shareholder at Brownstein Hyatt Farber Schreck, where he chaired the firm's Political and Regulatory Law Practice Group and its State Attorneys General Practice Group. His legal practice focuses on regulatory and consumer protection investigations, constitutional and election law, and appeals.

== United States Attorney ==
On June 20, 2018, President Donald Trump announced his intent to nominate Dunn to be the next United States Attorney for the United States District Court for the District of Colorado. On June 25, 2018, his nomination was sent to the United States Senate. On September 13, 2018, his nomination was reported out of the Senate Judiciary Committee by voice vote. On October 11, 2018, his nomination was confirmed by voice vote. He was sworn into office on October 26, 2018.

On February 8, 2021, he along with 55 other Trump-era U.S. Attorneys were asked to resign. On February 16, 2021, he announced his resignation, effective February 28.
