= Parker Thomson =

American lawyer

Parker Thomson (1932–2017) was an American lawyer.

== Early life and education ==
Thomson was born in Troy, New York, to a history professor from Russell Sage College. During his childhood, he attended Troy Savings Bank Music Hall, and later The Albany Academy before coming to Princeton University where he majored in the Woodrow Wilson School of Public and International Affairs and wrote his dissertation on the "U.S. Foreign Policy and the Schuman Plan".

== Career ==
=== Lawyer career ===
Initially trained in Harvard Law School, Thomson joined Hogan Lovells. From 1968 to 1983 he worked closely with Dan Paul, fellow Harvard graduate, to form Paul & Thomson law firm. During his time as a lawyer, Thomson represented periodicals such as Miami Herald in Miami Herald Publishing Co. v. Tornillo case in 1974 and The New York Times as well as corporations such as AT&T and Bank of America. He also did many pro bono cases for various organizations, including League of Women Voters, the Audubon Society, and Miccosukee tribe.

Two years after Paul & Thomson law firm split, Thomson became a chairman of the Dade County Fair Campaign Practices Committee. The same year, he also became a critic of Miami electoral campaigns, criticizing the candidates for being racist toward minorities. During those timers, he along with Dade Republican Party chairman Jeb Bush and Dade Democratic Party chairman Richard Pettigrew formulated a statement of fair campaign practices, a pledge candidates could sign to keep prejudice out of politics.

That pledge eventually led to Maurice Ferré dropping two advisors from his campaign for racist attack against his rival Marvin Dunn. Thomson was also a mentor to Rafael Peñalver, a Miami lawyer who succeeded him as chairman of the committee.

In 1998, Thomson represented Gianni Versace family, winning injunction following reports of stolen autopsy photos of the slain fashion designer. He also defended Teresa Earnhardt, the wife of Dale Earnhardt, who wanted to put her husband's autopsy photos under protection. The settlement was then signed by Teresa Earnhardt and the U.S. Supreme Court in 2001, which granted news organizations expert permission to examine the photos without making them public.

=== Philanthropy ===
As a philanthropist, Thomson led a drive to create the $300 million Adrienne Arsht Center for the Performing Arts in Miami, which opened in 2006. He and his daughter, Meg Daly, had collaborated along with Jorge A. Plasencia in a non-profit organization, Friends of the Underline. At the organization, Thomson served as director and was an advocate for transforming the land under the Miami-Dade Metrorail into a 10-mile, 120 acre linear park.

== Death and legacy ==
Following his death in November 2017, in Coral Gables, Florida, The Florida Bar created awards in Thomson's honor which is awarded to journalists in two categories: $500 and $250.
