= We'll Meet Again with Ann Curry =

- Genre: Documentary
- Created by: Justine Kershaw
- Presented by: Ann Curry
- Opening theme: "See You Again" by Charlie Puth
- Composer: Soundbyte
- Country of origin: United States
- Original language: English
- No. of seasons: 2
- No. of episodes: 12

Production
- Executive producers: Ann Curry; Justine Kershaw; Andra Heritage
- Producers: Simon Harries; Sara Woodford
- Running time: 53 minutes
- Production companies: Blink Films; Ann Curry Inc.

Original release
- Network: PBS
- Release: January 23, 2018 – January 8, 2019

We'll Meet Again with Ann Curry is an American documentary television series hosted by Ann Curry that premiered on January 23, 2018, on PBS. The series follows individuals who survived tragic events and are reunited with the long-lost people with whom they experienced that important moment.

The series is executive produced by Curry, Andra Heritage, and Justine Kershaw. The show marks Curry's first major project since leaving NBC News after 25 years.

The first season features people who experienced World War II, the 1980 eruption of Mount St. Helens, the Vietnam War, the September 11 terrorist attacks, the Civil Rights Movement of the 1960s, and the early days of the LGBT Movement of the 1970s.

== Premise ==
Each episode of We'll Meet Again introduces "two people who were affected by momentous events in American history. We follow them on a journey of detection as they look for a long-lost friend, family member or significant stranger. The series explores significant historic events that have shaped America and its citizens - not from the point of view of world leaders - but through the eyes of ordinary people who experienced them directly."

== Production ==
The series was conceived by British producer Justine Kershaw. She was inspired by her own reunion story which involves a Greek goat-herder who rescued her after a fall. After developing her initial concept, she set about finding a newsperson to serve as the presenter of the series. She describes deciding upon Curry by “literally, just Googling .... Every piece I saw just convinced me that this was the person.”

On July 26, 2017, it was announced that PBS had given the production a series order with first season consisting of six episodes. The series was set to be executive produced by Ann Curry, Justine Kershaw, and Andra Heritage and produced by Simon Harries. Production companies involved with the series were slated to consist of Blink Films and Ann Curry Inc. On October 29, 2018, it was reported that the series would return for a second season that was scheduled to premiere on November 13, 2018.

== Episodes ==
Season	Episodes	Originally released	
Season	Episodes	First released	Last released
1	6	January 23, 2018	February 27, 2018
2	6	November 13, 2018	January 8, 2019

=== Season 1 (2018) ===
No. overall	No. in season	Title	Original release date
1	1	"Children of WWII"	January 23, 2018
2	2	"Rescued from Mount St. Helens"	January 30, 2018
3	3	"Lost Children of Vietnam"	February 6, 2018
4	4	"Heroes of 9/11"	February 13, 2018
5	5	"Freedom Summer"	February 20, 2018
6	6	"Coming Out"	February 27, 2018

=== Season 2 (2018–19) ===
No. overall	No. in season	Title	Original release date
7	1	"Saved in Vietnam"	November 13, 2018
8	2	"Surviving the Holocaust"	November 20, 2018
9	3	"Great Alaskan Earthquake"	December 18, 2018
10	4	"Korean War Brothers in Arms"	December 25, 2018
11	5	"Escape from Cuba"	January 1, 2019
12	6	"The Fight for Women's Rights"	January 8, 2019

== Reception ==
The series has received a positive reception since its premiere. Verne Gay of Newsday gave the show three out of four stars and commented that "Curry’s trademark style is on display here but it’s not on over-display. She wisely stands aside for the most part and lets her subjects tell their stories. She does what she does best, which is to draw those out."
