= Elliot Mincberg =

Elliot Mincberg was General Deputy Assistant Secretary for of Congressional and Intergovernmental Relations at the Department of Housing and Urban Development from 2011 to 2014.

Mincberg grew up on the south side of Chicago, IL, and received his BA degree from Northwestern University in 1974, where he was active on the debate team and won the National Debate Tournament in 1973, and his JD from Harvard Law School in 1977.

Mincberg was a partner at the Washington, DC, office of Hogan & Hartson. He then served as Vice President, General Counsel and Legal Director of People For the American Way and People For the American Way Foundation. In February 2007, he joined the House Judiciary Committee staff and served as Chief Counsel for Oversight and Investigations. In June 2014, Mincberg joined the Washington Lawyers' Committee as senior counsel with a focus on DC prisoner litigation.

Mincberg has opined on Constitutional Law and has testified before Congress and has been active on many judicial confirmations. He has appeared as a guest on numerous TV and radio programs discussing legal and constitutional issues, including CBS's “60 Minutes,” ABC’s “Nightline,” CNN’s “Crossfire,” and National Public Radio’s “All Things Considered.”

Mincberg's son, David Mincberg, is the team counsel for D.C. United and the Director of Scouting for the Memphis Grizzlies.
