= Helix Semiconductors =

- Company type: Private
- Industry: Semiconductor
- Predecessor: Semitrex
- Founder: Michael H. Freeman
- Headquarters: 9980 Irvine Center Drive, Irvine, CA 92618
- Key people: Harold Blomquist, CEO and President
- Products: Muxcapacitor technology for power management, Tronium Power Supply System on a Chip (PSSoC), Inverter Supply System on a Chip (ISSoC)
- Website: helixsemiconductors.com

Helix Semiconductors, formerly Semitrex, is an Irvine, California-based fabless semiconductor company that designs chips for improved power management. The company's patented capacitive voltage reduction technology uses cascading capacitors to store power and convert voltages on chips, reducing the energy consumption of electronic devices.

The company also has offices throughout the United States and in Europe.

== History ==
Semitrex was founded in 2012 in Tulsa, Oklahoma by Michael H. Freeman, an Emmy Award-winning designer of mobile video technology that became the basis for the 802.11n wireless standard. The company's technology development efforts started with a search for improving the battery life of mobile phones, which led to power saving technology discoveries using capacitor-based circuits.

The company relocated to Laguna Beach, CA, and in February 2015 exited stealth mode and announced its technology. By that time, the company had filed 46 patents for its capacitive voltage reduction technology, which it called Muxcapacitor.

In March 2015, the company's integrated circuit (IC) was reportedly on its third generation, which the company announced was the last prototype before sample chips would be released to the market.

In July 2015, Semitrex hired Washington DC lawfirm Hogan Lovells to lobby for energy efficiency issues.

In February 2016, the company opened a design center in Irvine, California's "Technology Corridor", and an office in Milan, Italy, for better access to local engineering talent. The Milan office, also a design center, was reportedly focusing on mixed-signal analog chips, including digital power control designs. The Irvine design center became the company’s new headquarters.

In June 2016, the company opened its London Integrated Design Center and formed a UK subsidiary, Semitrex Integrated Semiconductors, Limited. The UK expansion would reportedly allow the company to modify its Muxcapacitor technology to create power inverters to support the European Union's 2009 Renewable Energy Directive.

In March 2017, the company rebranded as Helix Semiconductors, and Harold Blomquist was announced as the company's new CEO and President.

== Products/Technology ==
=== Muxcapacitor ===
The company's core semiconductor product is used for energy efficient power supplies. Its patented gate switch technology, called Muxcapacitor, is pre-regulation capacitive voltage reduction technology which uses cascading capacitors to more efficiently store power on a chip. Some capacitor banks are shut down when not in use, conserving power. The device also reduces the primary voltage through a transformer before the energy is processed for voltage and current adjustment and isolation. This reduces the size of the transformer and limits the need for secondary parts. Also, by using capacitive rather than inductive reductions, the need for magnets is eliminated, and very efficient high voltage conversions are achieved across a range of electrical loads.

=== Tronium PSSoC ===
Muxcapacitor technology is used on the company's Tronium brand of Power Supply System on a Chip (PSSoC), to manage power and reduce energy consumption for electronic devices. The Tronium PSSoC includes a dial-a-voltage feature which allows the chip to be programmed for a range of outputs from 1.8 to 48 volts, eliminating the need for additional country-specific power supplies. It also includes primary side regulation technology that eliminates the need for the opto-couplers which are traditionally required to maintain constant voltage and transfer electrical signals in the presence of high voltages. This reduces part count, allowing cost and size reductions of electrical equipment. The company sells a transformer-free Tronium variation called pwIoT (p-watt) designed for Internet of Things-type connected devices, which are often required to be compact to support a particular application. It takes AC line voltage and reduces it to the level of voltage the sensor requires. Products designed to work with minimal standby power requirements conserve energy and help solve the problem of vampire power drain, so-called because it drains while a machine or device is inactive. The pwIoT can be controlled remotely and wirelessly.

=== Inverter Supply System on a Chip ===
In June 2016, the company announced it was working in London on the reverse of the power supply process, with the Inverter Supply System on a Chip (ISSoC). While the core Tronium technology is designed to reduce energy consumption with high to low voltage power converters, the company began exploring the feasibility of designing an inverter to take low voltage DC, which typically comes from renewable energy sources, and boost it to high voltage AC. A so-called micro-inverter would help countries meet the EU's renewable energy application requirements.
