= John F. Walsh =

American attorney

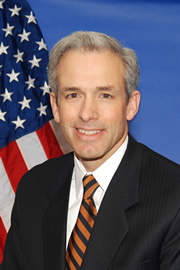

District Attorney of Denver
- Incumbent
- Assumed office January 14, 2025
- Preceded by: Beth McCann

United States Attorney for the District of Colorado
- In office August 16, 2010 – August 10, 2016
- President: Barack Obama
- Preceded by: David Gaouette (acting)
- Succeeded by: Robert Troyer

Personal details
- Born: May 28, 1961 (age 65) New York City, U.S.
- Party: Democratic
- Education: Williams College (BA); Stanford University (JD)

John F. Walsh (born May 28, 1961) is an American attorney who served as the United States Attorney for the District of Colorado from 2010 to 2016. Walsh was nominated by President Barack Obama on April 14, 2010, and sworn in on August 16, 2010. When he stepped down in 2016, Walsh was the longest-serving U.S. attorney in Colorado history.

== Education ==
Walsh attended Cherry Creek High School, a public high school in the Cherry Creek School District. He attended Rensselaer Polytechnic Institute for one year before transferring to Williams College, where he graduated magna cum laude and Phi Beta Kappa with a B.A. degree in political science.

Walsh graduated with a JD from Stanford Law School in 1986. Walsh graduated Order of the Coif and with honors. He was the senior notes editor of the Stanford Law Review and president of the Stanford Public Interest Law Foundation.

== Early career ==
In the late 1980s and early 1990s, Walsh served as an Assistant U.S. Attorney in the U.S. Attorney's Office in Los Angeles, where he headed the office’s major frauds section. Walsh was involved in high-profile prosecutions of securities fraud, investment schemes that targeted seniors, and insurance fraud. He was a member of the team that prosecuted Charles Keating for his role in the savings and loan crisis.

Walsh led the federal investigation that resulted in the indictment and resignation of Governor Fife Symington of Arizona.

Walsh helped prosecute Norwalk Assemblyman Bruce E. Young, who was sentenced to eighteen months in prison in what the Los Angeles Times called “one of the few successful political corruption prosecutions ever mounted against a California legislator.”

In 2004, Walsh ran for Denver District Attorney. The Denver Post endorsed Walsh, arguing that his “excellent combination of outlook, experience and skills” made him the best choice for the job.

== United States Attorney ==
=== Appointment ===
On April 14, 2010, Walsh was nominated by President Barack Obama to serve as United States Attorney for the District of Colorado. Walsh was unanimously confirmed by the United States Senate on August 5, 2010, and was sworn in on August 16, 2010. Attorney General Eric Holder attended Walsh’s formal investiture on January 12, 2011 in Denver.

=== Record ===
Walsh pursued legal action against Citibank for misconduct that contributed to the Great Recession. His office won $4 billion dollars in fines and $2.5 billion in consumer relief. The $7 billion resolution was the largest settlement in the history of the Colorado U.S. Attorney’s office.

Walsh co-chaired the Department of Justice’s Residential Mortgage-Backed Securities Working Group, a team of 55 attorneys, agents and analysts tasked with seeking criminal charges against individuals who committed mortgage fraud and contributed to the financial crisis.

Walsh prosecuted the pharmaceutical company GlaxoSmithKline (GSK) for misconduct in the marketing of its products. GSK pled guilty and paid a $3 billion penalty, the largest health care fraud fine in history.

=== Resignation ===
Walsh stepped down as U.S. Attorney on July 29, 2016. Upon his resignation, the Department of Justice praised Walsh for concluding “the largest federal penalty cases in Colorado’s history, collecting literally billions of dollars on behalf of American taxpayers and the United States Treasury.”

== Private practice ==
On January 9, 2017, Walsh joined the law firm WilmerHale as a partner in their Denver Office.

In early 2019, the Rocky Mountain Immigrant Advocacy Network announced that Walsh and a team of WilmerHale attorneys will be honored with the Network's 2019 Pro Bono Service Award. Walsh’s team represented immigrant parents and relatives detained and separated from their children under the Trump administration's family separation policy.

== Return to politics ==
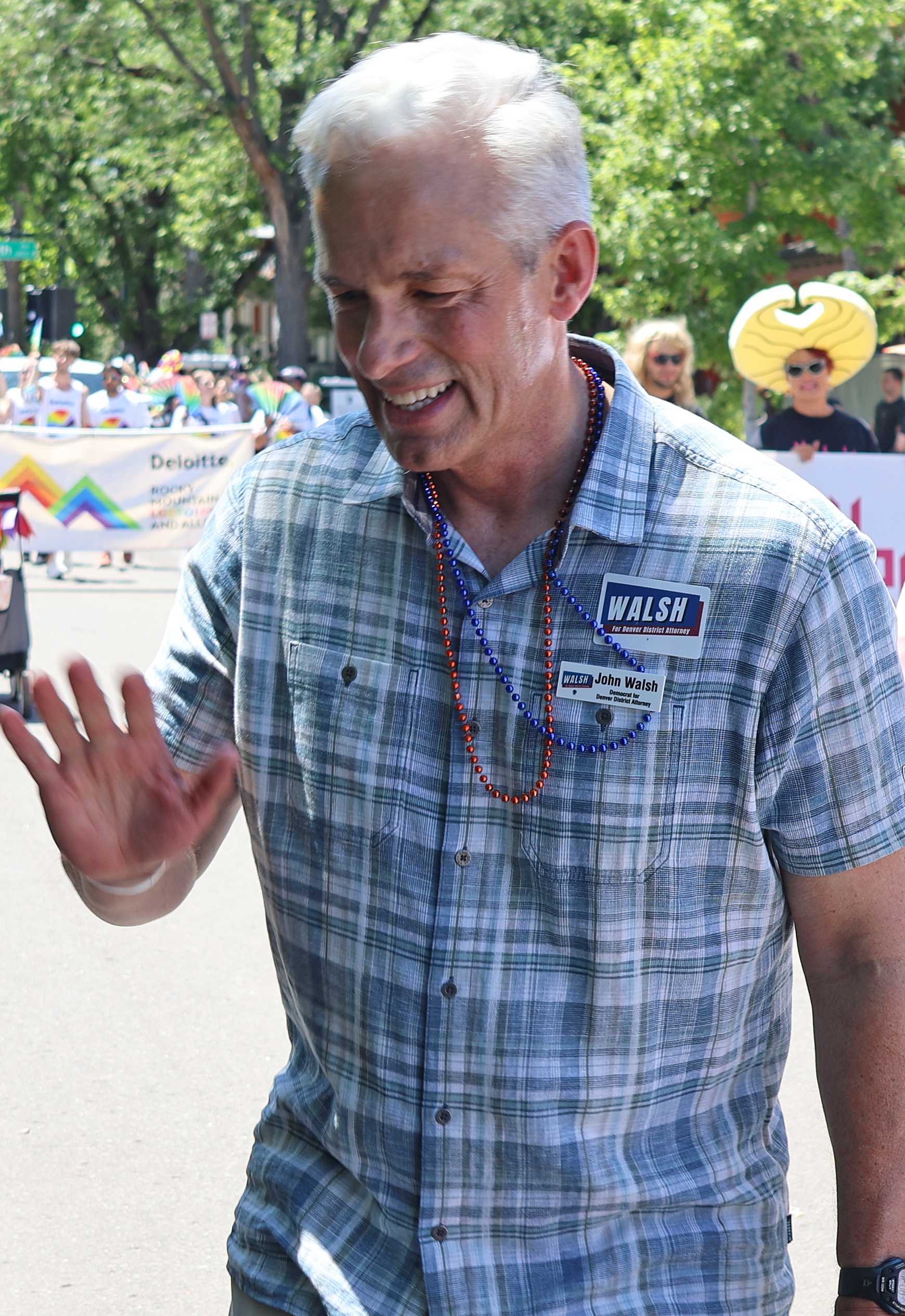
Campaigning for Denver DA in 2024

On March 18, 2019, Walsh stepped down from his job at WilmerHale to run for the United States Senate seat then held by Republican Cory Gardner. Walsh dropped out of the race after former Colorado Governor John Hickenlooper announced his candidacy for the seat.

In 2024, Walsh announced his candidacy for Denver District Attorney. He won the Democratic Party primary on June 25th, making him the presumptive winner in the November general election, as he faces no significant opposition.

== Personal life ==
Walsh lives in Denver with his wife, Lisa.

Walsh serves on the board of directors of Invest in Kids, a Colorado nonprofit focused on early childhood education and health. He has previously served on the boards of directors of the Colorado Lawyers Committee, the Faculty of Federal Advocates, the Leadership Denver Alumni Association, and the United States-Mexico Law Institute.
