= Foundation for Middle East Peace =

Nonprofit organization in Washington D.C., United States

- Formation: 1979; 47 years ago
- Founder: Merle Thorpe Jr.
- Type: 501(c)(3) organization
- Tax ID no.: 52-6055574
- Headquarters: Washington, D.C.
- President: Lara Friedman
- Website: fmep.org

The Foundation for Middle East Peace (FMEP) is an American nonprofit organization based in Washington, D.C, with the goal of promoting a just, safe and peaceful future for Palestinians and Israelis. The organization was founded in 1979 by lawyer and philanthropist Merle Thorpe Jr.

The foundation is currently led by Lara Friedman, a former U.S. foreign service officer in Jerusalem.

== Operations ==
The FMEP has extensively documented Israeli settlements in the West Bank and East Jerusalem, which are illegal under international law, tracking their growth in the occupied territories.

The FMEP publishes analyses of American legislation related to Israel, Palestine, and the Middle East, including federal foreign policy legislation and state and local anti-BDS laws.
