= Merle Thorpe Jr. =

American lawyer

- Born: 1918; Washington, D.C., U.S.
- Died: February 13, 1994 (aged 75–76)
- Education: Yale College; Yale University
- Occupations: Lawyer and philanthropist

Merle Thorpe, Jr. (1918 – February 13, 1994) was an American lawyer and philanthropist.

== Early life, education and military service ==
Thorpe was born in Washington, D.C., and attended the Sidwell Friends School, the St. Albans School – both in Washington – and the Phillips Exeter Academy in Exeter, New Hampshire. He then earned bachelor's and law degrees from Yale University in New Haven, Connecticut.

Thorpe served as a U.S. Navy intelligence officer during World War II.

== Career and philanthropy ==
After the war, Thorpe joined the Washington, D.C., law firm Hogan & Hartson, where he was a partner from 1956 to 1982.

Thorpe led a number of early shareholder's rights battles.

Thorpe took a trip to the Middle East with U.S. Senator William Fulbright in 1975 and afterwards Fulbright became a mentor to Thorpe about the region.

Thorpe's interest in the region led him to start the Foundation for Middle East Peace in 1979.

== Death ==
He died of cancer in 1994.
