= John Pajak =

American judge

John Justin Pajak (1932 – October 18, 2009) was a special trial judge of the United States Tax Court.

== Career ==
Born in Buffalo, New York, Pajak attended public schools in Buffalo, New York. He attended Syracuse University from 1950 to 1954, earning a B.A., magna cum laude, majoring in American Studies. There, he was a member of Phi Beta Kappa, and Vice-President of Orange Key (Junior Men's Honorary). From 1953-56 he was in the Syracuse University College of Law in a combination program which culminated in his earning of an LL.B., which was, later, converted to a J.D. He was in the Order of the Coif, and was a Notes Editor on the Syracuse Law Review. Admitted to New York Bar in 1956, Pajak joined the U.S. Department of Justice under the Attorney General's Recruitment Program for Honor Law Graduates, and served as an attorney from 1956-61. He was first in the Office of Alien Property, Litigation Section, 1956–58, and then moved to the Tax Division, Appellate Section, until 1961. He was admitted to the District of Columbia Bar in 1961, and entered private practice with the firm of Hogan & Hartson, in Washington, D.C., from 1961 to 1966, then practicing with Andrew F. Oehmann until 1972, becoming a partner in Oehmann and Pajak. In 1972 he joined the Washington Office of Nixon, Hargrave, Devans & Doyle, a Rochester, New York, firm, serving as resident counsel until 1979.

On May 31, 1979, Pajak was appointed by the chief judge of the United States Tax Court to be a special trial judge of that court. He was Liaison Special Trial Judge from 1984 to 1985, and Chief Special Trial Judge from 1985 to 1987.

Having been "active in Northern Virginia Democratic Party politics" in the late 1960s to early 1970s, he was a volunteer in the Barack Obama 2008 presidential campaign.

== Personal life and death ==
Pajak became engaged to Elizabeth Pierson in 1954, with whom he had one daughter before their marriage ended in divorce. In 1997, Pajak remarried to Agnes Aranyi of Charlotte, North Carolina.

Pajak died on October 18, 2009, from asphyxiation following a choking incident, at the age of 77.
