= Frank J. Hogan =

American lawyer

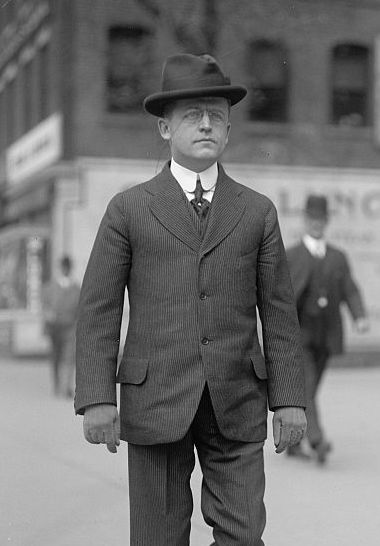
- Born: Francis Joseph Hogan; January 12, 1877; Brooklyn, New York City
- Died: May 15, 1944 (aged 67); Washington, D.C.
- Education: Georgetown University (LLB)
- Known for: Trial lawyer; president of the American Bar Association, 1938–1939
- Spouse: Mary Cecile Adair
- Children: Dorothy

Francis Joseph Hogan (January 12, 1877 – May 15, 1944) was an American lawyer who co-founded the firm Hogan & Hartson in 1904 and served as president of the American Bar Association (ABA) from 1938 to 1939. He represented several high-profile clients, including President Warren G. Harding, oil tycoon Edward L. Doheny, and banker Andrew Mellon. As ABA president he created the association's Committee on the Bill of Rights and supported the controversial Walter-Logan bill.

In 1938, Hogan denounced racial and religious intolerance in a half-hour speech aimed at fellow Catholics; the speech was aired on the same 34 radio stations used by the notoriously antisemitic priest, Charles Coughlin, immediately following Coughlin's regular broadcast.

== Early life and education ==
Hogan was born to Maurice Hogan and Mary E. (McSweeney) Hogan in Brooklyn, New York, on January 12, 1877. His father died when Hogan was five years old, leaving his mother to support three children on a seamstress's wages. In the 1880s, the family moved to Charleston, South Carolina, where they lived with Mary's sister. Hogan grew up in a household run by two widowed women, along with his cousin James F. Byrnes, who went on to become United States Secretary of State and governor of South Carolina.

At 12, Hogan left school to work as a stockboy in a local store. A stenographer taught him how to write in shorthand, a skill that proved to be valuable throughout his career. He became a stenographer himself and then worked as a railway clerk, a brokerage clerk, and a reporter for a local newspaper. In his spare time, he schooled himself by reading books recommended by friends.

In 1898, he joined the US Army and put his clerical and railway experience to work in logistics, serving as secretary to the Chief Quartermaster of the Army, secretary to the Quartermaster General in Washington, and secretary to the Chief of Staff of the Army. After work, he would spend his evenings studying law at Georgetown University. He completed the three-year program in two years, graduating at the head of his class in 1902.

== Law career ==
After his graduation, Hogan went into private practice. At first, he practiced law part-time in the evenings while he worked for the War Department during the day. He cofounded a Washington law firm, Hogan & Hartson, in 1904. From 1912 to 1919, he lectured at Georgetown University on the law of wills, evidence, and partnership.

Hogan rose to national fame working on several high-profile cases in the 1920s and the 1930s. His most notable case was his defense of oil tycoon Edward L. Doheny and the Pan-American Petroleum and Transport Company in a series of trials from 1924 to 1930. In what came to be known as the Teapot Dome scandal, Doheny was accused of bribing Interior Secretary Albert Fall to lease the oil production rights at Elk Hills Oil Field. The company was forced to cancel its lease, but Hogan succeeded in clearing Doheny on charges of bribery and conspiracy to defraud the government. In 1935 he successfully defended Andrew Mellon on charges of tax evasion against assistant attorney general, Robert H. Jackson. Other clients included former president Warren Harding, the General Electric Company, Armour & Co., and Swift & Co. He appeared on the cover of Time magazine in 1935. Reportedly, he once said that "the best client is a rich man who is scared."

== American Bar Association ==
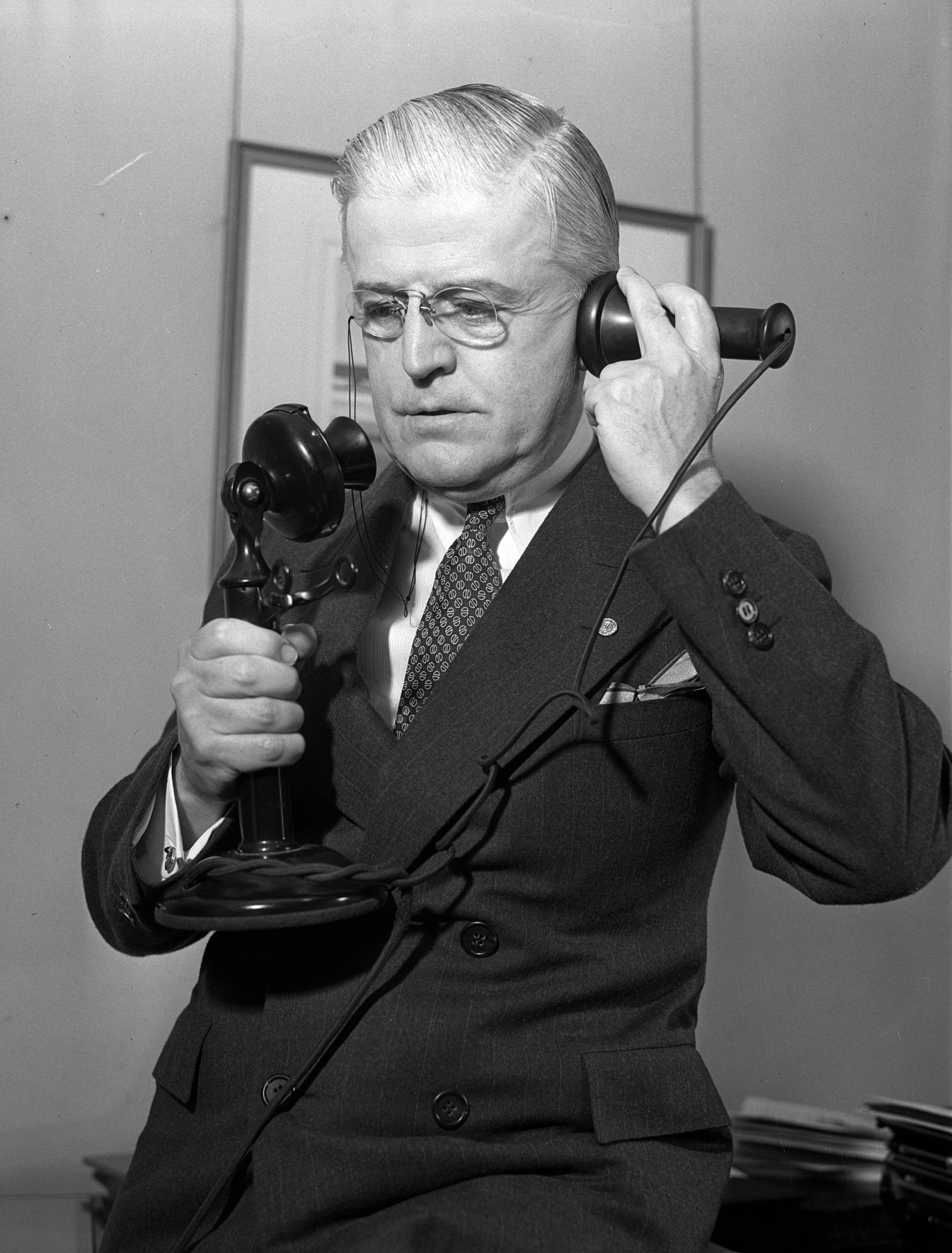
Hogan in c. 1935

From 1930 to 1931, Hogan served as president of the Washington Lawyers' Club, and from 1932 to 1933, he was president of the District of Columbia Bar Association. In 1932, he organized the entertainment for the ABA when it held its 55th annual meeting in Washington, D.C., and so became interested in its national organization. He was elected to its executive committee in 1933, served on the budget committee, and helped to create the ABA's House of Delegates in 1936.

He became the first DC lawyer to serve as president of the ABA when he was unanimously elected in 1938. During his tenure, he created the Committee on the Bill of Rights. Among other things, it filed an amicus brief in Hague v. Committee for Industrial Organization, an important case on freedom of assembly. Hogan also supported the conservative Walter-Logan bill, which was passed by Congress and would have imposed strict constraints on federal administrative agencies if it had not been vetoed by Franklin Roosevelt. A precursor to the Administrative Procedure Act, the bill was criticized by some as an attempt to undermine the New Deal.

== 1938 radio address ==
On December 11, 1938, under the auspices of the General Jewish Council, Hogan denounced racial and religious intolerance in a half-hour speech aimed at fellow Catholics. Titled "An American Catholic Speaks on Intolerance", Hogan's speech was interpreted as a rebuke of Charles Coughlin, an antisemitic priest whose weekly radio broadcasts were attracting millions of listeners across the country. Although Hogan did not mention Coughlin by name, the implication was clear since his speech was aired on the same 34 radio stations used by Coughlin immediately following Coughlin's regular broadcast.

Upon the unquestionable authority of Pius the Eleventh, as given to the world in his public utterances, I speak today to refute any idea that anyone who preaches racial or religious intolerance speaks for the Catholic laymen or the Catholic priesthood. ...

[O]ne hate breeds another. Wherever Jews are persecuted, there too other creeds and races will sooner or later be persecuted. This was true of the Ku Klux Klan in our own country, the Klan whose hatred was not limited to Catholics, but included Jews and Negroes as well.

One thing is becoming ever more clear to serious students of history. That the Jews have become the barometer of democracy throughout the world. Where they are oppressed, as in Germany, democracy and freedom have been utterly destroyed, and Christians have also suffered. Where they are the equals of all other citizens, as in America, democracy lives and flourishes, and all men are free whatever their faith.

The speech was widely quoted in newspapers the next day. The full text was reprinted in the Pittsburgh Press.

== Personal life ==
Hogan married Mary Cecile Adair of Savannah, Georgia, in 1899; they had a daughter, Dorothy. In addition to his professional work, Hogan served for a time as vice president of the Shakespeare Association of America. He also collected rare books and manuscripts, which he kept in a library on the top floor of his home. By the time of his death, the Frank J. Hogan Library was one of the world's most valuable private collections. The books were sold at auction in New York in 1945 and 1946.

After completing his term as president of the ABA, he was forced to retire because of poor health. He was diagnosed with the early stages of Parkinson's disease in 1938, and his health steadily declined after that. Hogan died at his home in Washington, D.C., on May 15, 1944, after a long illness.

== Awards ==
Hogan received a commendation from the Secretary of War, Newton D. Baker, for his pro-bono services to veterans of World War I. His honorary degrees included an LL.D. from Georgetown University (1925), an LL.D. from Laval University (1929), a D.C.L. from the University of Southern California (1939), and an LL.D. from Manhattan College (1939). At a special service in Jerusalem in 1931, he received an award of the Equestrian Order of the Holy Sepulchre.

== See also ==
- Frances Sweeney
