= Adım Adım Initiative =

Volunteer-based social initiative in Turkey

Adım Adım logo

Adım Adım ("step-by-step" in Turkish) is a volunteer-based social initiative in Turkey that promotes charitable giving through sponsorship for sports like running, cycling, swimming and trekking. Formed in 2007, Adım Adım is Turkey's first charity running group and as of 2011 it was the largest amateur running group in the country.

Adım Adım is the official social responsibility partner of Intercontinental Istanbul Eurasia Marathon and the Antalya Marathon. Figures provided by Adım Adım show it has helped raise donations in excess of USD 1 million in conjunction with major running events and other sports competitions over the past three years, USD 250,000 of which was collected during the first quarter of 2011.

== Projects ==
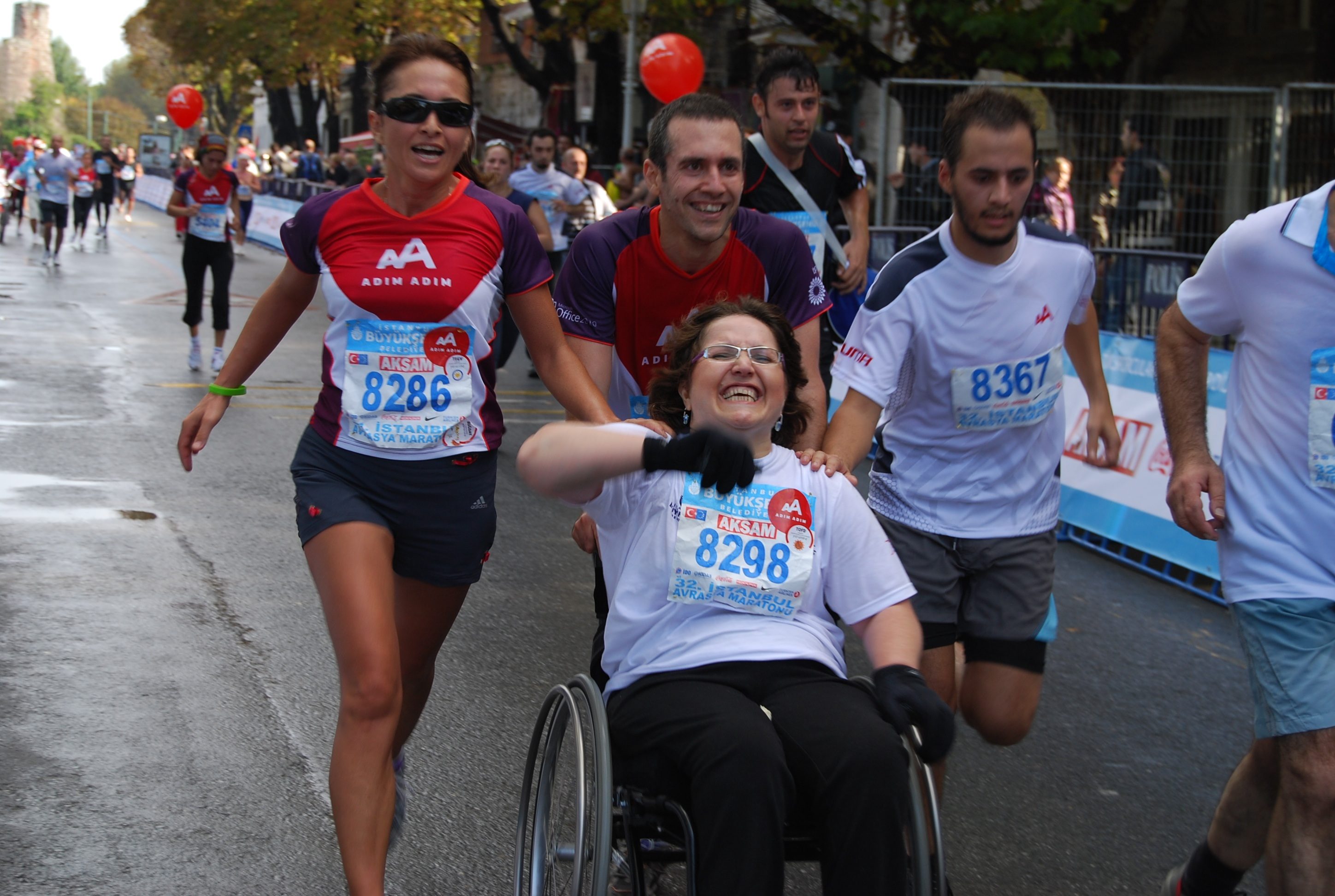
Adım Adım members in wheelchair and on foot participating the Istanbul Marathon, October 17, 2010

Unlike many other similar initiatives Adım Adım works for more than one charity organization acting only as an intermediary for collecting donations. Upon choosing the organizations they follow, Adim Adim says they consider criteria like the social utility of a project, transparency and accountability.

Adım Adım runners, swimmers, walkers and cyclists supported the following projects during 2007-2011:

- Buğday Association - TaTuTa Organic Farm Stays Project
- The Educational Volunteers Foundation of Turkey (TEGV) - Midyat and Savur, Mardin “Ateşböceği” Mobile Education Unit Project
- Turkish Spinal Injury Association (TOFD) - Motorized Wheelchair Project
- Community Volunteers Foundation (TOG) - Scholarships and “Gençlere Değer” projects
