= Hogan Lovells =

Former American-British law firm

- Headquarters: London, UK; Washington, D.C., US
- No. of offices: 51
- No. of attorneys: 2,532
- Major practice areas: General practice
- Key people: Marie-Aimée de Dampierre (Chairperson); Miguel Zaldivar (CEO); Michael Davison (Deputy CEO)
- Revenue: ▲US$2.682 billion (2023)
- Profit per equity partner: US$1.029 million
- Date founded: 2010 (Hogan Lovells); 1904 (Hogan & Hartson); 1899 (Lovells)
- Company type: Limited liability partnership
- Dissolved: 30 June 2026
- Website: hoganlovells.com

Hogan Lovells (/ˈlʌvəlz/ LUV-əlz) was an American-British law firm co-headquartered in London and Washington, DC. The firm was formed in 2010 by the merger of the American law firm Hogan & Hartson and the British law firm Lovells. As of 2024, the firm employed about 2,800 lawyers, making it the sixth-largest law firm in the world.

In 2022, Hogan Lovells was ranked as the twelfth-largest law firm in the world by revenue, generating around US$2.6 billion. Revenue per lawyer exceeds US$1million.

In December 2025, Hogan Lovells announced that they will merge with Cadwalader, Wickersham & Taft to form Hogan Lovells Cadwalader. The merger completed on 1 July 2026.

== History ==
=== Hogan & Hartson ===
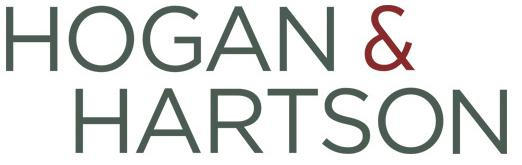
The logo of Hogan & Hartson prior to the Hogan Lovells merger

Hogan & Hartson was founded by Frank J. Hogan in 1904. In 1925, Hogan was joined by Nelson T. Hartson, a former Internal Revenue Service attorney, and John William Guider. Hogan & Hartson then went into partnership in 1938 with Guider as a silent partner.

In 1970, Hogan & Hartson became the first major firm to establish a separate practice group devoted exclusively to providing pro bono legal services. The Community Services Department (CSD) dealt with civil rights, environmental, homeless and other public interest groups. In 1990, Hogan & Hartson opened an office in London, their first outside the U.S.

In 1972, the firm gained its first black law partner, trial lawyer Vincent H. Cohen (April 7, 1936 – December 25, 2011), who was of Jamaican heritage; had joined the firm in 1969; and had previously held positions at the U.S. Department of Justice, and at the U.S. Equal Employment Opportunity Commission. Cohen's clients included Bell Atlantic, Pepco, and The Washington Post. His son, Vincent Cohen, Jr., served as an interim U.S. Attorney for the District of Columbia.

The firm expanded its presence in New York and Los Angeles, in 2002, when it acquired mid-sized law firm Squadron, Ellenoff, Plesent & Sheinfeld, a New York City–based general practice firm.

=== Lovells ===
The logo of Lovells prior to the Hogan Lovells merger

Lovells traced its history in the UK back to 1899, when John Lovell set up on his own account at Snow Hill, between St Paul's and Smithfield. He was later joined by Reginald White, a clerk in his previous firm, to whom he gave articles. In 1924, they were joined by Charles King, forming Lovell, White & King. Soon after formation, the firm moved to Thavies Inn at Holborn Circus and later to Serjeant's Inn, Fleet Street, before moving to 21 Holborn Viaduct in October 1977.

Lovells was formed as a result of a number of earlier mergers. In 1966, Lovell, White & King merged with Haslewoods, a firm with a much longer history of private client work. Haslewoods diverse clients included the Treasury Solicitor. In 1988, Lovell, White & King, which by then had a large international commercial practice, merged with Durrant Piesse, known, in particular, for its specialism in commercial banking and financial services, forming Lovell White Durrant. It then changed to Lovells in 2000 when the firm merged with German law firm Boesebeck Droste.

=== Hogan Lovells ===
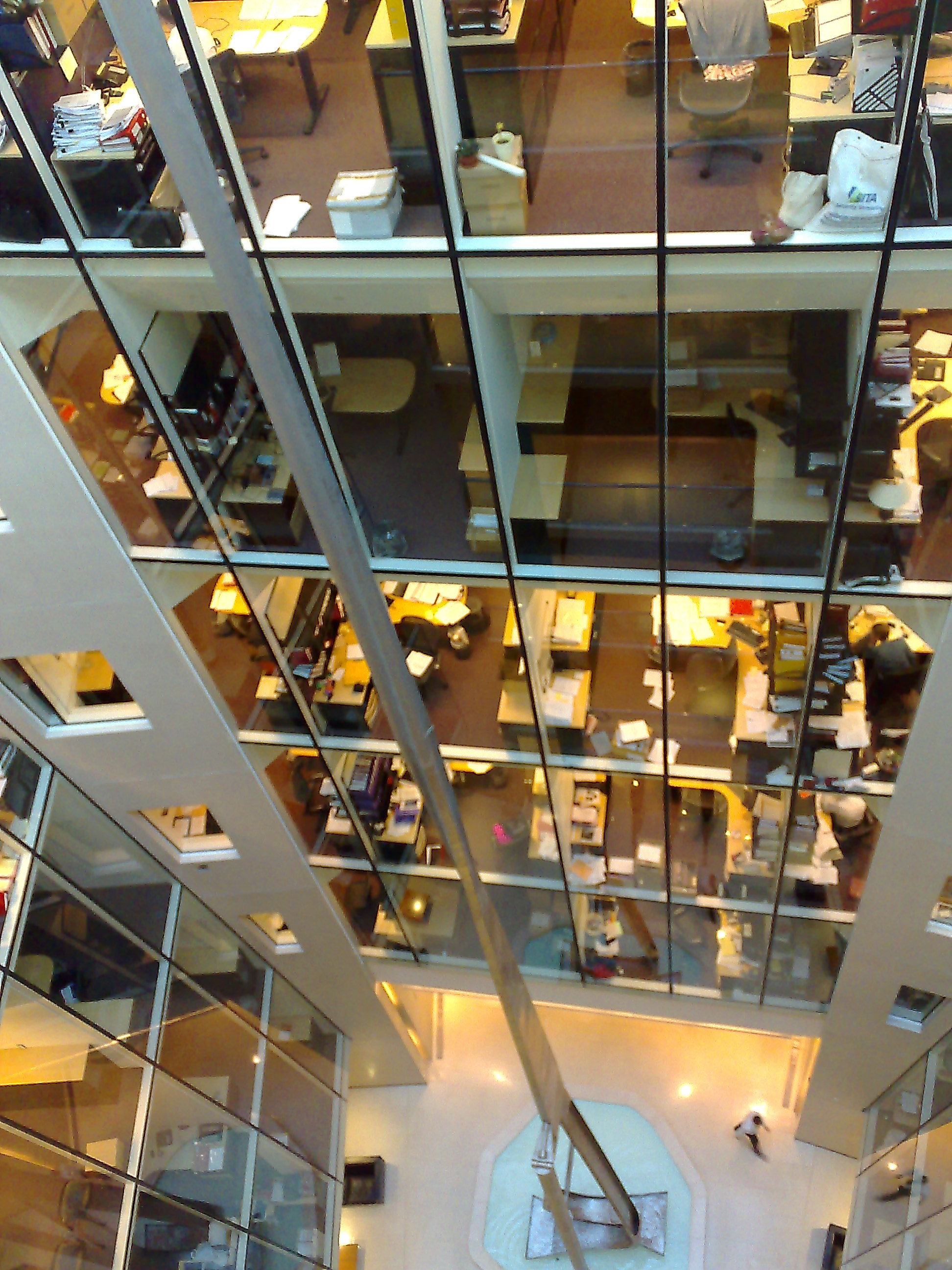
The London office of Lovells in 2008, shortly before the merger with Hogan & Hartson.

Hogan & Hartson and Lovells announced their agreement to merge on 15 December 2009. Hogan Lovells was officially formed on May 1, 2010.

In December 2011 it was reported that the firm would be moving to a single chairman model following the retirement of John Young.

In December 2013, Hogan Lovells merged with South African firm Routledge Modise. The addition of about 120 lawyers in the Johannesburg office make up the first physical location for Hogan Lovells in Africa although the firm maintains a presence in Francophone Africa through its Paris office.

In July 2020, Hogan Lovells announced Miguel Zaldivar, former Asia Pacific and Middle East regional chief executive as the new global CEO. In 2021, the firm appointed Paris-based Marie-Aimée de Dampierre as its chair, later reappointing her to a second two-year term, effective May 2024.

=== Hogan Lovells Cadwalader ===
In December 2025, Hogan Lovells announced that they would merge with Cadwalader, Wickersham & Taft LLP to form Hogan Lovells Cadwalader and become the fifth-largest law firm in the world. The merger was approved by partners in April 2026 and was scheduled to take effect on July 1, 2026. It was announced that Miguel Zaldivar, the current CEO of Hogan Lovells, would continue to serve as CEO of the combined firm.

== Notable cases ==
In 2013, Hogan Lovells advised Kodak Pensioner Plan on its $650 million acquisition of the personal film business from Kodak. In the same year, the firm also counselled tech-giant Dell on its $24.4 billion deal to go private and advised fashion label Nicole Farhi on its £5.5 million sale to businesswoman and heiress, Maxine Hargreaves-Adams.

In 2014, Hogan Lovells advised Apple Inc. on its $17 billion (£10.9 billion) bond issue, described as the largest corporate bond offering in history. In 2014, Hogan Lovells advised the Republic of Ecuador in the negotiation of a multimillion-dollar facility agreement to be used by the state-owned television and radio network, RTV Ecuador. In May 2014, Snapchat turned to Hogan Lovells to hire its first General Counsel, appointing a Washington DC–based partner.

In 2015, the firm advised long-standing client SABMiller on its £7.8 billion acquisition of Australian brewer Foster's Group on aspects of structuring the bid and acquisition finance. In July 2015, power management semiconductor company Semitrex hired Hogan Lovells to lobby for energy efficiency issues. On December 19, 2017 Massachusetts Senate Committee in Ethics hired Hogan Lovells to lead an inquiry into Senate President Stanley C. Rosenberg's conduct and whether he violated the rules of the Senate stemming from allegations from four men that Rosenberg's husband, Bryon Hefner, sexually assaulted or harassed them and bragged he had influence on Senate business.

=== Lobbying in the United States ===
Hogan Lovells was among the largest lobbying firms in the United States. Before the merger, by revenue, Hogan & Hartson was among the top five lobbying firms in the United States. Since the merger, the firm has remained among the largest lobbying firms, servicing $12.3 million in lobbying 2013.

=== South African Revenue Service (SARS) scandal ===
In October 2016, Hogan Lovells was inserted into the Jonas Makwaka investigation as part of the Zuma corruption scandal. Although the report concluded that "disciplinary action should be taken", the document was widely seen as effectively a whitewash.

== Notable attorneys and alumni ==
=== Current attorneys ===
- Neil Chatterjee – Former Commissioner and Chairman of the Federal Energy Regulatory Commission (FERC)
- Hilary Tompkins – Former Solicitor of the U.S. Department of the Interior

=== Former attorneys ===
==== Judiciary ====
- James A. Belson – Judge of the District of Columbia Court of Appeals
- Tanya S. Chutkan – Judge of the United States District Court for the District of Columbia
- Daniel D. Domenico – Judge of the United States District Court for the District of Colorado
- John M. Ferren – Judge of the District of Columbia Court of Appeals
- Ann Lininger – Judge of the Clackamas County Circuit Court
- George W. Miller – Judge of the United States Court of Federal Claims
- Carlos G. Muñiz – Justice of the Supreme Court of Florida
- David Nahmias – Associate Justice of the Supreme Court of Georgia
- John Pajak – Special trial judge of the United States Tax Court
- John Roberts – Chief Justice of the United States
- Jane Marum Roush – Justice of the Supreme Court of Virginia
- Donald S. Russell – Judge of the United States Court of Appeals for the Fourth Circuit
- John Sirica – Judge of the United States District Court for the District of Columbia, presiding judge in the Watergate cases
- David S. Tatel – Judge of the United States Court of Appeals for the District of Columbia Circuit
- Eric T. Washington – Judge of the District of Columbia Court of Appeals
- Wilhelmina Wright – Judge of the United States District Court for the District of Minnesota

==== Elected office ====
- Norm Coleman – United States Senator from Minnesota
- J. William Fulbright – United States Senator from Arkansas
- Josh Hawley – United States Senator from Missouri
- Scott McInnis – Member of the U.S. House of Representatives from Colorado's 3rd district
- John Porter – Member of the U.S. House of Representatives from Illinois's 10th district
- Paul Rogers – Member of the U.S. House of Representatives from Florida's 11th district
- John Warner – Former United States Senator from Virginia

==== Academia ====
- Audrey J. Anderson – Vice Chancellor, General Counsel and University Secretary for Vanderbilt University
- Matthew Daniels – Chair of Law and Human Rights and Founder of the Center for Human Rights and International Affairs at the Institute of World Politics
- Christopher Yoo – John H. Chestnut Professor of Law, Communication, and Computer and Information Science at the University of Pennsylvania Law School
- Chris Brand – Research Fellow, Psychology and Psychometrics at Nuffield College

==== Other government service ====
- A. Lee Bentley III – United States Attorney for the Middle District of Florida
- Sandy Berger – United States National Security Advisor
- William Bittman – Federal prosecutor responsible for prosecuting Jimmy Hoffa and Bobby Baker
- Mark Brzezinski – U.S. Ambassador to Sweden
- Charles B. Curtis – United States Deputy Secretary of Energy
- Cole Finegan – Denver's City Attorney and Chief of Staff
- Gregory G. Garre – 44th U.S. Solicitor General
- Anthony Stephen Harrington – U.S. Ambassador to Brazil
- Brian Hook – U.S. Special Representative for Iran
- Kevin S. Huffman – Commissioner of the Tennessee Department of Education
- Elliot F. Kaye – Commissioner of the U.S. Consumer Product Safety Commission
- Loretta Lynch – 83rd U.S. Attorney General
- Keisha A. McGuire – Grenadian Permanent Representative to the United Nations
- Jelena McWilliams – Chairman of the Federal Deposit Insurance Corporation
- Cheryl Mills – Counselor of the United States Department of State
- Elliot Mincberg – General Deputy Assistant Secretary for Congressional and Intergovernmental Relations at the Department of Housing and Urban Development
- Ignacia S. Moreno – Assistant Attorney General for the U.S. Department of Justice Environment and Natural Resources Division
- John E. Osborn – Member of the U.S. Advisory Commission on Public Diplomacy
- Daniel Poneman – Acting United States Secretary of Energy
- Elizabeth Prelogar – 48th U.S. Solicitor General
- Chuck Rosenberg – Administrator of the Drug Enforcement Administration; United States Attorney for the Eastern District of Virginia
- Hagan Scotten – former Assistant U.S. Attorney for the Southern District of New York
- Tom Strickland – U.S. Attorney for the District of Colorado; Assistant Secretary of the Interior for Fish, Wildlife and Parks
- Christine A. Varney – White House Cabinet Secretary; Commissioner of the Federal Trade Commission
- Clayton Yeutter – Counselor to the President; Chair of the Republican National Committee; U.S. Secretary of Agriculture; U.S. Trade Representative

==== Other ====
- Robert S. Bennett – Attorney for President Bill Clinton during the Lewinsky scandal
- Ty Cobb – Member of the Trump administration legal team
- Robert Corn-Revere – First Amendment lawyer
- Donald Dell – Sports attorney, writer, commentator, and former tennis player
- Frank Fahrenkopf – Chair of the Republican National Committee; Co-founder of the Commission on Presidential Debates
- Frank J. Hogan – Founder of Hogan Lovells; President of the American Bar Association
- Khizr Muazzam Khan – Parent of Humayun Khan
- Duncan McNair – Lawyer and author
- David Wendell Phillips – Angel investor and executive
- Radoslav Procházka – Slovak politician
- Jessica Prunell – Former child actress
- Regina M. Rodriguez – Former nominee to the United States District Court for the District of Colorado
- Edward "Smitty" Smith – Candidate for Attorney General of the District of Columbia
- Allen Snyder – Former nominee to the U.S. Court of Appeals for the District of Columbia Circuit
- Parker Thomson – Lawyer and philanthropist
- Merle Thorpe Jr. – Lawyer and philanthropist
- Ted Trimpa – Democratic strategist, lobbyist and political consultant
- Christine Warnke – Senior vice president at Capitol Hill Consulting Group and talk show host
- Daniel R. White – Author
- Edward Bennett Williams – Founder of Williams & Connolly; Treasurer of the Democratic National Committee

== See also ==
- Hogan Lovells Professor of Law and Finance, a position at the University of Oxford
- List of largest United States-based law firms by head count
