= David Mincberg =

American sports executive

David H. Mincberg is a lawyer and sports executive that has worked for the Detroit Pistons, Milwaukee Bucks, Memphis Grizzlies (National Basketball Association), and D.C. United (Major League Soccer).

== Biography ==
Mincberg was Vice President of Basketball Strategy for the Milwaukee Bucks for three seasons (2016-17 - 2019-20) under Bucks General Manager Jon Horst, who described Mincberg as "a very creative thinker" that built out the Bucks salary cap and strategy department. Pistons General Manager Troy Weaver hired Mincberg in July 2020 as "something of a jack of all trades" with experience ranging "from scouting to analytics to salary-cap management to legal counsel." Mincberg spent one year with the Pistons before the sides parted ways.

Mincberg has a Juris Doctor from the University of California, Berkeley, School of Law and worked on the acquisitions of both the Memphis Grizzlies and D.C. United (Major League Soccer) before serving as the in-house counsel for both organizations. In his capacity as team counsel for D.C. United, Mincberg was tasked with negotiating a deal to secure a new stadium for D.C. United, which would allow the franchise to remain in D.C. In July 2013, after working closely with City Administrator Allen Lew, Mincberg helped DC United strike a deal with the city of Washington, D.C. that was heralded as "likely to give (the) franchise the kick it needs." In his capacity as team counsel for the Memphis Grizzlies, Mincberg was involved with the team's business operations, basketball operations, and ownership group. He also played an active role in the team's player personnel decisions, draft process, and scouting.

Mincberg has also contributed to the field of Sports Law as an adjunct professor and through his legal scholarship, which has been cited by Westlaw's treatise "The Fundamentals of Sports Law".
