= Brownstein Hyatt Farber Schreck =

American law firm

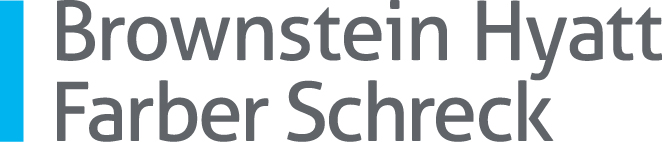
- Headquarters: Denver, Colorado
- No. of offices: 13
- No. of attorneys: 250
- Major practice areas: Real estate, natural resources, public policy, corporate and litigation
- Date founded: 1968
- Company type: LLP
- Website: www.bhfs.com

Brownstein Hyatt Farber Schreck LLP is a lobbying and law firm based in the United States with 250 attorneys and policy consultants in 13 offices across the western U.S. and in Washington, D.C.

== History ==
The firm was founded in 1968 by Norman Brownstein, Jack Hyatt, and Steve Farber in Denver, Colorado. The three men attended the University of Colorado Law School together in the 1960s. Hyatt, who was the first managing partner of the firm, died in 2017 at the age of 75. Farber, who helped raise money to bring the 2008 Democratic National Convention to Denver, died in 2020 at the age of 76.

Brownstein Hyatt Farber Schreck experienced a record year in 2015, with its revenue increasing by nearly 7 percent to $172.2 million and its net income increasing by 6 percent to $58.4 million. The firm’s profits per partner increased nearly 7 percent to $899,000. The firm credited that growth to increased client demand and executing on its defined business strategy.

== Lobbying practice ==
In 1995, the firm expanded its services to include lobbying.

On January 1, 2007, Brownstein Hyatt & Farber merged with Schreck Brignone, and the new firm was named Brownstein Hyatt Farber Schreck. Frank Schreck is a former chairman of the Nevada Gaming Commission. A 2016 article in the Denver Post called the firm "a national juggernaut".

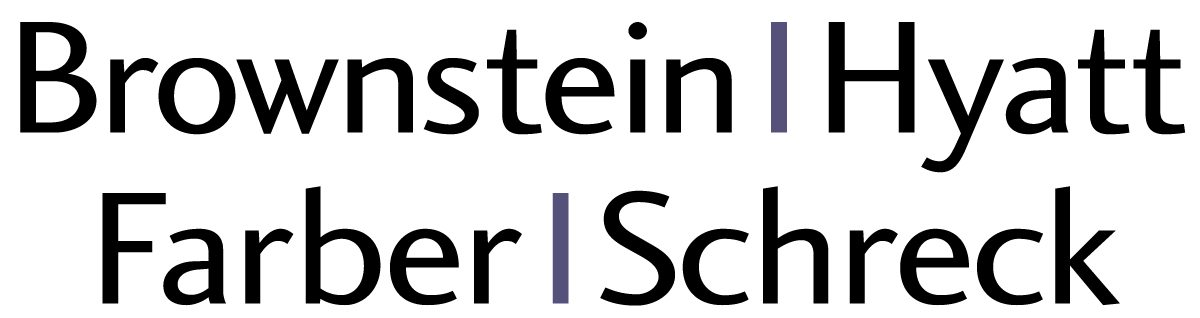
Former logo

The company has lobbied on behalf of the Saudi Arabian government.

In 2021, Brownstein Hyatt Farber Schreck earned US $56.25 million in federal lobbying revenue, making it the largest lobbying firm in the nation. As of March 2020, the firm had 13 offices across the United States and 600 employees.
