= Airline Ambassadors International =

Non-profit organization based in Arlington, Virginia

Airline Ambassadors International (AAI) is a registered 501(c)(3) non-profit organization based in Arlington, Virginia and founded by American Airlines flight attendant Nancy Rivard in 1996 as a form of volunteer tourism. Its initial focus was humanitarian aid in Central America due to American Airlines' presence there, but has expanded to 52 countries.

Its focus further expanded in 2009 to partner with other airports to help prevent human trafficking, although their claims about the scale of the issue are under question.
