= Weekend Today =

American morning television program

- Also known as: Saturday Today & Sunday Today
- Presented by: Saturday: Laura Jarrett; Carson Daly; Joe Fryer; Angie Lassman; Sunday: Willie Geist
- Theme music composer: John Williams (1987–2013); Non-Stop Music (2013–present)
- Country of origin: United States
- Original language: English

Production
- Executive producer: Matthew Carluccio
- Production locations: Studio 1A, NBC Studios, New York City, New York; Studio N5, NBC News Studios, Washington, D.C. (Saturday 2020–2023)
- Camera setup: Multi-camera
- Running time: 88–104 minutes (Saturday); 44–52 minutes (Sunday)
- Production company: NBC News Productions

Original release
- Network: NBC
- Release: September 20, 1987 – present

Related
- Today

Weekend editions of Today, an American morning news and talk program that airs daily on NBC, began with the launch of the Sunday edition of the program on September 20, 1987. After NBC expanded Today to seven days a week in the 1990s, the name Weekend Today was adapted primarily for promotional purposes.

The Saturday edition of the program, titled Saturday Today since March 2022, is broadcast live in alignment with the weekday editions of Today from 7:00 to 9:00 a.m. Eastern Time. Since 2017, however, the Saturday broadcast is frequently shortened by a half-hour (sometimes even shorter/preempted due to earlier sports start times) to accommodate Premier League soccer matches or other sports events that start before 1:00 p.m. ET (and does not air at all during the weekend of golf's U.S. Open), allowing NBC stations to also accommodate programs from The More You Know block displaced from their normal timeslots to fulfill educational content quotas. Some affiliates outside the Eastern Time Zone air it live, and others on tape-delay. Thus, it may air on some NBC stations as early as 5:00 or 6:00 a.m. local time.

Meanwhile, the Sunday edition, titled Sunday Today with Willie Geist since April 17, 2016, airs from 8:00 to 9:00 a.m. ET. Some NBC affiliates choose to air local morning newscasts before and after both Saturday and Sunday editions of the program.

== History ==
The Sunday edition of Today (titled Sunday Today) premiered on September 20, 1987, and was originally hosted by Maria Shriver and Boyd Matson, with Garrick Utley as news anchor and Al Roker as weather anchor. The program was broadcast from 8:00 to 9:30 a.m., followed by Meet the Press. It was the second morning news program to run weekend editions, CBS previously attempted a six-day-a-week morning news program under the "Morning" banner in 1979, the only surviving remnant of which is the newsmagazine CBS News Sunday Morning.

External videos
- TODAY Begins Sunday Broadcasts, archived by Today on YouTube. Sunday Today premieres on September 20, 1987 with Maria Shriver and Boyd Matson.

Utley replaced Matson as co-anchor on March 20, 1988. Shriver, weather anchor Al Roker and sports anchor Bill Macatee continued with the program. In 1989, production of Sunday Today moved to Washington, D.C. to allow Utley to also serve as moderator of Meet the Press.

On November 12, 1989, a special edition of Sunday Today featured Utley in Berlin covering the fall of the Berlin Wall earlier that week, with Shriver hosting from Burbank, California and Roker in New York City. At the end of the broadcast, Utley mentioned that Shriver was leaving the show to go on maternity leave. NBC News national correspondent (and eventual co-anchor of the weekday edition of Today) Katie Couric, Deborah Norville, Faith Daniels and Mary Alice Williams became substitute anchors during Shriver's absence.

Maria Shriver returned to Sunday Today from maternity leave on April 8, 1990, and announced that she would be leaving after that day's broadcast. Couric was named interim co-anchor until Mary Alice Williams became the new co-anchor later that month. Production of the Sunday program returned to New York City when Utley left Meet the Press in 1991.

The Today franchise expanded to seven days a week with the premiere of the program's Saturday edition on August 1, 1992, coinciding with NBC's replacement of its Saturday morning children's programming block with the three-hour-long TNBC block. The weekend editions were initially titled Saturday Today or Sunday Today, as applicable, in order to distinguish them from the weekday program. Beginning in the late 1990s, all editions of the program were officially titled Today, although Weekend Today was still sometimes used for promotional purposes. In September 1999, when Ford left for ABC News, John Seigenthaler, Brian Williams and weekday host Matt Lauer along with various NBC News reporters rotated as co-host alongside Soledad O'Brien. The Sunday program was once again titled "Sunday Today" when Willie Geist became solo anchor in 2016.

Amy Robach, Alexis Glick, Carl Quintanilla, David Gregory, John Seigenthaler, Hoda Kotb, Maurice DuBois (2003; 2004), Natalie Morales, Melissa Francis, Peter Alexander, Rob Morrison, Savannah Guthrie, Tamron Hall and Tom Llamas rotated as news anchors during the Brown and Holt era (2003–2007). From 1988 (when Utley became co-anchor) until 2012 (when Jenna Wolfe became the program's news anchor), Weekend Today did not have a designated news anchor. During that time, a different NBC News, CNBC, or MSNBC correspondent would fill that position each week. Lester Holt left the program in 2015 following his promotion to lead anchor of NBC Nightly News. (Holt had been anchoring the weekend editions of both Today and Nightly News prior to his reassignment.)

In March 2020, the Saturday edition abruptly relocated production to NBC News' Washington, D.C. bureau, originating from the Meet the Press studio, in order to limit the risk of COVID-19 transmission to the anchors via air travel. (Saturday anchors Peter Alexander and Kristen Welker had both been based out of the division's D.C. bureau, though Alexander had been commuting to New York City to anchor that edition from the Rockefeller Center studio since being named co-anchor in 2018.) The broadcast permanently relocated to the news division's refurbished D.C. bureau facility (near Capitol Hill) in December 2020, as one of several NBC and MSNBC programs to broadcast from the building.

== Format ==
The weekend broadcasts continue Today's format of covering breaking news stories, featuring interviews with newsmakers, reports on a variety of popular culture and human-interest stories, covering health and financial issues and presenting the day's national weather forecasts. As with the weekday edition, the program offers visitors to New York City the chance to observe the workings of a live television broadcast firsthand with its windowed studio at Rockefeller Plaza. Interaction with the crowd outside the studio is a major part of the program.

Weekend editions are tailored to the priorities and interests of weekend viewers – offering special series such as Saturday Today on the Plaza, featuring live performances by well-known and up-and-coming music acts and numbers from Broadway theatre productions outside the studio throughout the summer. The Sunday edition also features brief political discussions with Meet the Press moderator Kristen Welker, who also gives a preview of that day's edition of the political discussion show (which follows Sunday Today, depending on local scheduling of newscasts, local political affairs programs or brokered programming that may air between both programs).

Logo for Sunday Today with Willie Geist

Since the adoption of the Sunday Today format in 2016, the Sunday edition does not feature a national weather segment; instead the weather reports during that broadcast are presented as live or recorded cut-ins produced by the corresponding local NBC station.

Just like their weekday counterparts, the weekend broadcasts provide local stations the option to offer brief news and weather segments following the national weather segments (on the Saturday edition) and in designated five-minute slots at the end of each half-hour. (NBC stations that do not produce weekend morning newscasts may opt to either run a taped weather insert, or run the national forecast slide and filler content that occupies the respective local segment slots on the network feed.)

== On-air staff ==
Saturday Today is co-anchored by Laura Jarrett and Carson Daly. Joe Fryer (feature anchor) and Angie Lassman (meteorologist) appear alongside them. Sunday Today is anchored solely by Willie Geist. On August 9, 2023, Laura Jarrett, NBC News' senior legal correspondent was named new co-host starting September 9, replacing Kristen Welker who became the new moderator of Meet the Press. Carson Daly, who appears on the weekday editions of Today, was announced as co-anchor of Saturday Today on November 5, 2026, after serving as interim co-anchor since September.

=== Former anchors ===
==== Sunday Today ====
- Boyd Matson – co-anchor (1987–1988)
- Maria Shriver – co-anchor (1987–1990)
- Garrick Utley – news anchor/substitute co-anchor (1987–1988), co-anchor (1988–1992)
- Katie Couric – co-anchor (1990)
- Mary Alice Williams – co-anchor (1990–1992)
- Al Roker – weather anchor/substitute co-anchor (1987–1992), co-anchor (1991–1992)
- Bill Macatee – sports anchor/substitute co-anchor (1987–1992)

==== Weekend Today ====
- Scott Simon (1992–1993)
- Jackie Nespral (1992–1995)
- Mike Schneider (1993–1995)
- Giselle Fernández (1995–1996)
- Jack Ford (1995–1999)
- Jodi Applegate (1996–1999)
- Ann Curry (1996, 1999)
- Soledad O'Brien (1999–2003)
- John Seigenthaler (1999–2000, 2003)
- Carl Quintanilla, Len Cannon, Maurice DuBois, Brian Williams, Chris Matthews, Bob Kur, Kelly O'Donnell, Rob Morrison, Sara James, Tim Russert, Hoda Kotb, Fredricka Whitfield (1999–2000)
- David Bloom (2000–2003)
- Campbell Brown (2003–2007)
- Lester Holt (2003–2015)
- Amy Robach – news anchor (2003–2007), Saturday co-anchor (2007–2012)
- Jenna Wolfe – Sunday co-anchor (2007–2012), Saturday and/or Sunday co-anchor (2012), news anchor (2012–2014)
- Erica Hill (2012–2016); now with CNN
- Sheinelle Jones – news anchor (2014–2016), Saturday co-anchor (2016–2019)
- Craig Melvin — co-anchor (2015–2016), Saturday co-anchor (2016–2018)
- Stephanie Ruhle — Saturday co-anchor (2016)
- Kristen Welker — Saturday co-anchor (2020–2023)
- Peter Alexander — Saturday co-anchor (2018–2026); now with MS NOW

=== Weather anchors ===
- Al Roker – Saturday weather anchor (1992–1995) substitute co-anchor (1992–1999)
- Joe Witte – Sunday weather anchor/substitute co-anchor (1992–1995)
- Janice Huff – Saturday and/or Sunday weather anchor (1995; 1996–2012)/Substitute co-anchor (1995-1999)
- Sean McLaughlin – Sunday weather anchor (2004–2006)
- Chris Cimino – Saturday weather anchor (2006–2008)
- Bill Karins – Saturday weather anchor (2009–2012)
- Stephanie Abrams – Saturday & Sunday weather anchor (2012)
- Dylan Dreyer – Saturday (2012–2022) & Sunday weather anchor (2012–2019)
- Somara Theodore – Saturday weather anchor (2022–2023); now with ABC News

== Theme music ==
Scherzo for Today was used as the program's closing theme until 1990, and the Mission bumpers were used until 1993 (one of them could be heard as a station break lead-in on NBC's Meet the Press until 2004). The Scherzo for Today theme was iconically accompanied by Fred Facey announcing "From NBC News, this is Today..." until his death in April 2003, except for special editions requiring special introductions. Facey's work afterwards was only heard on the now defunct MSNBC program Headliners and Legends. For a time early in the original Sunday Today run; the Scherzo for Today theme was preceded by a recap of clips of stories from the previous week set to "Freightways" by Graham De Wilde.

The Mission cut used as the opening fanfare for Today has opened the program ever since, with two exceptions: in the summer of 1994, to mark the debut of Studio 1A, the John Williams-composed fanfare was replaced by another opening theme, but the Williams theme returned shortly thereafter. In 2004, the show's producers tried out yet another theme, which drew once again on the NBC chimes as its signature, but the Williams theme returned after only a few weeks. It is by far the most enduring theme in the program's history, having been in use for over two decades. In March 2013, "The Mission" was replaced with a theme by Adam Gubman for Non-Stop Music, which is based partly on the Mission theme. A lighter theme employing the NBC chimes is currently used to open the show's 7:30 and 8:30 a.m. half-hour segments and is also used as a closing theme.

== Special editions ==
Following the Space Shuttle Columbia disaster on February 1, 2003, the Sunday edition of Weekend Today aired a special edition on February 2, with the expanded introduction:

Disaster: The Space Shuttle Columbia. From NBC News, this is a special edition of Today with Soledad O'Brien at Kennedy Space Center in Cape Canaveral, Florida and David Bloom at the Johnson Space Center in Houston, Texas.

The next edition on February 3 was also a special broadcast with Matt Lauer at Studio 1A in New York and Katie Couric at the Johnson Space Center in Houston.

On April 6, 2003, the death of co-anchor David Bloom in Iraq (caused by a blood clot resulting from Deep vein thrombosis) dominated that day's edition. Soledad O'Brien, Matt Lauer anchored from New York City and Katie Couric stationed in Washington, D.C. hosted a special edition of Today in remembrance of Bloom.

When Pope John Paul II died on Saturday, April 2, 2005, Katie Couric and Matt Lauer anchored the weekend editions of Today. Lauer anchored from Vatican City with Campbell Brown offering reports by his side. On the day of the Pope's death, Couric anchored a special report on a Vatican statement updating the Pope's dire condition and Lauer reported for the special report anchored by Brian Williams, when the Pope was officially declared dead. Lauer returned to New York City as Couric traveled to Vatican City to co-anchor coverage of the Pope's funeral with Williams.

On April 19, 2008, a special edition of Weekend Today featured Pope Benedict XVI's visit to the United States, billed as "The Pope Visits the USA." Lester Holt and Jenna Wolfe moved outside to Rockefeller Center to cover the first papal mass at St. Patrick's Cathedral in New York City. However, they moved back to Studio 1A at the 7:30 a.m. half-hour.

On May 10, 2008, Weekend Today featured a special split-location edition covering the wedding of Jenna Bush at the ranch of President George H. W. Bush outside Crawford, Texas. Co-anchor Lester Holt remained at Studio 1A, while Amy Robach covered the wedding from Texas.

On June 14, 2008, a special edition of Saturday Today, anchored by Matt Lauer and Tom Brokaw, discussed the death of NBC News Washington bureau chief and Meet the Press moderator Tim Russert. Andrea Mitchell, David Gregory, Pete Williams, Lisa Myers, the moderators of Meet the Press's competing Sunday morning talk shows, Bob Schieffer of Face the Nation and George Stephanopoulos of This Week, and Vice President Dick Cheney, among others, appeared to share their memories of Russert. The Sunday edition on the following day (June 15), another special edition on the death of Russert was broadcast, hosted by Gregory and Mitchell.

On April 30, 2011, Natalie Morales and Al Roker anchored a special edition of Weekend Today from London to cover the wedding of Prince William and the former Catherine Middleton.

As part of their coverage of Super Bowl XLVI on February 4, 2012, a special Saturday edition was anchored by Lester Holt and Amy Robach from Studio 1A with Jenna Wolfe anchoring from that year's Super Bowl location, Indianapolis, Indiana. The following Sunday's edition was another special edition with Matt Lauer live from Washington, D.C., and Ann Curry, Natalie Morales, Savannah Guthrie, and Al Roker live from Indianapolis.

As part of their coverage of Terror in Boston, on Saturday, April 20, 2013, a Saturday edition was anchored by Matt Lauer and Savannah Guthrie from Studio 1A at Rockefeller Plaza and Lester Holt and Erica Hill from Watertown, Massachusetts.

As part of their coverage of the 2014 Winter Olympics, officially known as the XXII Olympic Winter Games, Morales and Lester Holt anchored a special edition of Weekend Today from Sochi, Russia, with Erica Hill reading news headlines and Dylan Dreyer with weather in Studio 1A.

As part of their coverage of the November 2015 Paris attacks, a special Saturday edition was anchored by Matt Lauer and Savannah Guthrie, with Sheinelle Jones reading news headlines and Dylan Dreyer with weather in Studio 1A, and Al Roker live from Paris. The Sunday edition on the following, another special edition was broadcast with Erica Hill live from Paris and Harry Smith as co-anchor, with Sheinelle Jones reading news headlines and Dylan Dreyer with weather in Studio 1A.

On May 19, 2018, a special Saturday edition was anchored by Savannah Guthrie and Hoda Kotb with weather by Al Roker to cover the Wedding of Prince Harry and Meghan Markle was live at Windsor, England.

On August 28, 2018, a special Sunday edition was anchored by Kristen Welker filling in for Willie Geist to cover the death of Sen. John McCain.

On July 14, 2024, following the 2024 attempted assassination of Donald Trump in Pennsylvania, a special 2-hour edition of Today aired instead of Sunday Today anchored by Willie Geist and Savannah Guthrie.

On July 4, 2026, a special Saturday edition was anchored by Savannah Guthrie and Craig Melvin with weather by Al Roker to cover America's 250th birthday with a continuing 6-hour coverage at New York Harbor. The Sunday edition on the following day July 5, a special recap edition of Sunday Today was anchored by Willie Geist.

On August 1, 2026, a special Saturday edition, is scheduled to air in honor Saturday Today's 34 anniversary to be anchored by Laura Jarrett and Garrett Haake.

== Viewership ==
The program has more viewers than ABC's Good Morning America Weekend Edition and CBS' CBS Saturday Morning, but fewer than CBS News Sunday Morning. During the weekend of September 15, 2012, the weekend edition of Good Morning America topped Weekend Today in the ratings for the first time in that program's history.

== International broadcasts ==
- In Australia Weekend Today airs at 3:00 a.m. Mondays on the Seven Network, followed by Meet The Press.
- In the Philippines, the Saturday and Sunday editions air on 9TV (formerly called as Talk TV and Solar News Channel) on Saturdays at 10:00 p.m. local time and Sundays at 10:30 p.m. local time.
