= Lassman =

Lassman is a German and Ashkenazi Jewish surname. Notable people with the surname include:

- Abigail Lassman, later known as Abbe Lane (born 1932), American singer and actress
- Angie Lassman (born 1990), American television meteorologist and journalist
- Kent Lassman (born 1974), American public policy analyst and think tank executive

== See also ==
- Lassmann, another surname
