= Erica Hill =

American journalist

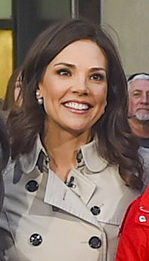
- Hill in May 2015
- Born: Erica Ruth Hill; July 20, 1976 (age 49); Clinton, Connecticut, U.S.
- Education: Boston University (B.A., 1998)
- Occupation: News correspondent
- Years active: 1998–present
- Notable credit(s): On the Story (2016–2018); Weekend Today (2012–2016); CBS This Morning (2012); The Early Show (2010–2012); The Early Show Saturday Edition (2008–2010); Anderson Cooper 360° (2008–2010); Prime News with Erica Hill (2005–2008); TechLive (2001–2003)
- Spouse: David Yount
- Children: 2

Erica Ruth Hill-Yount (born July 20, 1976) is an American journalist who, as of 2024, worked for CNN. She served as a primary substitute anchor and a correspondent. She co-anchored Weekend Today from 2012 to 2016, following work at CBS since 2008.

== Personal life ==
Hill was born in Clinton, Connecticut, the daughter of Cheryl and Steven Holmes Hill. She graduated from Boston University with a Bachelor of Arts degree in journalism in 1998. She is a member of Alpha Epsilon Phi. She is fluent in French. Hill married David Yount on October 15, 2005, and on November 25, 2006, gave birth to her first son, and a second son on March 23, 2010

Hill has been an Americares board member since 2020.

== Career ==
Hill began her journalism career in 1998 as a production assistant for "PC Week Radio", the online news program for PC Week magazine. During this time, she also worked as a conference coordinator for the Software Publishers Association Europe. She worked at TechTV from 2000 to 2003 as part of the TechTV News program, later named TechLive. From 2000 to 2001, she served as reporter, and from 2001 to 2003, she was co-anchor and correspondent for the program. She is noted for her live reporting of the September 11 attacks when she was working for TechTV.

=== CNN ===
Hill joined CNN's Headline News channel in January 2003, working as a general news anchor for different programs. In 2004, she joined CNN Newsource as a national correspondent. She co-anchored Prime News Tonight from 2005 to 2006 before becoming anchor of Prime News with Erica Hill from 2006 to 2008. She began providing news updates for Anderson Cooper 360° (AC360°) in April 2005, and was named a full-time member in February 2008. Hill also co-anchored CNN Tonight during its November 2009 to January 2010 run.

=== CBS News ===
On September 22, 2008, Hill was named the new co-anchor of the Saturday edition of The Early Show on CBS after filling in on a temporary basis six weeks earlier. Her first show as the permanent anchor was on September 27, 2008. She continued to appear on AC360° for CNN until January 8, 2010, when it was announced on AC360° that she would be leaving CNN immediately to join CBS News.

CBS announced on January 13, 2010, that Hill would be replacing Russ Mitchell on the weekday edition of The Early Show the following week, and on January 18, the Early Show cast officially welcomed Hill to the program. On June 29 and July 5, 2010, Hill anchored the CBS Evening News in Katie Couric's absence. With Maggie Rodriguez on maternity leave, Hill was also the primary female anchor on The Early Show in June 2010. Hill also anchored the CBS Evening News while Scott Pelley was in Afghanistan on October 4, 2011.

On November 30, 2010, Erica Hill was named co-anchor of CBS' The Early Show, effective January 3, 2011. On November 15, 2011, CBS announced that Charlie Rose and Gayle King would join Hill as co-anchors of a new CBS News morning program, CBS This Morning, launching January 9, 2012. On July 26, 2012, CBS announced that Hill would be replaced by Norah O'Donnell on CBS This Morning in late 2012. Hill served as a Special Correspondent for CBS News, from September 2012 to November 1, 2012, contributing to all CBS broadcasts although she never appeared on-air in this role.

=== NBC News ===
NBC announced on November 1, 2012, that starting November 3, 2012, Hill would join Weekend Today as co-anchor and would serve as an NBC News national correspondent. NBC News president Steve Capus said, "Erica's extraordinary track record as a journalist has proven that she can cover everything from hard news to pop culture with ease and professionalism. She's a fantastic addition to Weekend Today and I'm delighted to welcome her to NBC News." On April 3, 2016, Hill announced she was leaving the Weekend Today show in order to spend more time with family, but continue daily news reporting on MSNBC and NBC Nightly News.

=== Return to CNN and HLN ===
On June 6, 2016, Hill was announced as rejoining HLN as the anchor of a daytime news program, and additionally contribute to CNN. Her daily new program, On the Story with Erica Hill, premiered in October 2016.

=== Back to CNN ===
On April 19, 2018, it was announced that Erica Hill would return to CNN as lead fill-in anchor and national correspondent. She left her HLN show On the Story which originated from New York City. Former Weekend Express anchor Lynn Smith was named as host in March 2019.

=== Career timeline ===
- 2000–2003: TechTV News anchor and reporter
- 2003–2010: CNN
  - 2005–2006: Prime News Tonight co-anchor
  - 2005–2010: Anderson Cooper 360° news updates anchor
  - 2006–2008: Prime News with Erica Hill anchor
  - 2009–2010: CNN Tonight co-anchor
- 2008–2012: CBS News
  - 2008–2010: The Early Show Saturday co-anchor
  - 2010–2012: The Early Show weekday anchor & news anchor
  - January 2012 – September 2012: CBS This Morning co-anchor
  - September 2012 – November 1, 2012: CBS News special correspondent
- 2012–2016: NBC News
  - November 3, 2012 – April 3, 2016: Weekend Today co-anchor
  - November 3, 2012 – 2016: NBC News National correspondent
  - 2013–2016: Dateline NBC contributing anchor & correspondent
  - 2013–2016: NBC Nightly News substitute anchor
  - 2012–2016: Today substitute co-anchor
  - 2015–2016: MSNBC anchor & correspondent
  - 2016: NBC Nightly News Saturday anchor
- 2015: 90 Day Fiancé - ‘Tell All’ host (S3E11), aired 11/01/2015
- 2016: Sister Wives season 10 'Tell All' host
- 2016–2018: HLN & CNN
  - 2016–2018: HLN On the Story anchor
  - 2016–2018: CNN contributor
- 2018–present: CNN
  - 2018–present: CNN lead fill-in anchor & national correspondent
