= Lassmann =

Lassmann is a surname. Notable people with the surname include:

- Peep Lassmann (1948–2025), Estonian pianist
- Sten Lassmann (born 1982), Estonian pianist

== See also ==
- Lassman, another surname
