= Angie Lassman =

American meteorologist (born 1990)

- Born: November 22, 1990 (age 35); Fraser, Michigan
- Education: Fraser High School
- Alma mater: Florida Institute of Technology (BS, MS)
- Occupation: Meteorologist
- Years active: 2016-present
- Employer: NBC News
- Awards: Emmy Award

Angie Lassman (born November 22, 1990) is an American television meteorologist who works for NBC News. She appears on the Saturday edition of Today and on NBC News Now on weekdays. Additionally, she serves as a fill-in for Al Roker and Dylan Dreyer. She also appears on NBC Nightly News. Lassman joined NBC News in November 2022 after working at NBC station WTVJ in Miami, Florida, since 2016.

== Early life and education ==
Lassman was born and raised in Fraser, Michigan, and attended Fraser High School, where she played volleyball and basketball, and graduated in 2008. She earned a Bachelor of Science degree in meteorology with a minor in communications from Florida Institute of Technology in 2013. She went on to receive her Master of Science degree in meteorology from Florida Institute of Technology in 2014. From 2008 to 2013, Lassman competed on the Florida Tech Volleyball Team as a libero. She was a two-year team captain, finishing with 1,606 career digs, second highest in school history.

== Early career ==
Angie held the role of weekday morning meteorologist at FOX 26 KNPN in Saint Joseph, Missouri to begin her career.
