= Mary Alice Williams =

American news anchor (born 1949)

Mary Alice Williams (born March 12, 1949) is a pioneering journalist and broadcast executive who broke gender barriers by becoming the first female Prime Time anchor of a network news division and first woman to hold the rank of Vice President of a news division. Her work and visibility put her in the vanguard, whether at the birth of CNN or later at the dawn of the revolution in information technology. In addition to CNN, she has also served as anchor at many prominent networks, including PBS, Discovery, and NBC.

== Personal life ==
Williams was born in Minneapolis, Minnesota, the second of five children born to Alice Mary (née Griebel) and Dr. George E. Williams, a psychiatrist and a dean at the University of Minnesota Medical School. Williams was educated at the Convent of the Visitation and began working as a reporter for KSTP-TV as a high school student. She received a B.A. in English and Mass Communications from Creighton University in Omaha, Nebraska. During college she filed reports for KSTP and the Chicago Bureau of NBC News on topics such as political assassinations, women's liberation, and anti-war movement. Williams is the mother of three daughters: Alice Ann, born 1990 and twins Sara Mary and Laura Abigail, born 1992. In June 2014, following her first marriage, to Mark Haefeli, a CNN producer, she married Dr. Julian Decter, a hematologic oncologist at Weill Cornell Medical Center in New York.

== Career ==
The day after graduating college, Williams was named executive producer of news for KSTP. A year later, she held the same role (at WPIX-TV) in New York and then became reporter/ anchor at WNBC-TV.

=== Accomplishments ===
As one of the primary architects behind the design of the first worldwide television network, Williams oversaw the construction of CNN's New York Bureau at the World Trade Center prior to the launch of Cable News Network CNN in 1980. She served as New York Bureau Chief, overseeing the planning and operation of the network's second largest bureau with responsibility for seven hours of original programming per day. She was also one of the channel's principal anchors. In 1982, Williams was appointed vice president, becoming one of the highest ranking female executives in American television. She was a vital member of CNN's political anchor team, co-hosting Inside Politics with Bernard Shaw.

=== NBC career ===
In 1989, Williams moved to NBC News where she co-hosted Yesterday, Today & Tomorrow, a series of news magazine specials which were controversial, since they included dramatic reenactments similar to the television show, Unsolved Mysteries; substitute anchored NBC Nightly News; and co-hosted Sunday Today. In 1990, Williams was one of a group of NBC News personnel who won a News and Documentary Emmy award in the category of Outstanding General Coverage of a Single Breaking News Story (Segments) for "Romanian Revolution Coverage" on NBC Nightly News and Weekend Nightly News. She shared this award with fellow anchors Tom Brokaw, Garrick Utley, John Cochran, Deborah Norville, and Katie Couric, and correspondents Dennis Murphy, George Lewis, Arthur Kent, and Tom Aspell. During her tenure with NBC from 1989 to 1993, she also anchored Sunday Today, NBC News Special Reports, and NBC's extended coverage of Desert Storm: War in the Gulf. Williams was a frequent anchor and correspondent for NBC Nightly News, NBC News at Sunrise and Today.

In the 1990s, she represented the telecommunications company NYNEX in a series of commercials.

=== The Discovery Network ===
Williams has been the host of The Discovery Channel's "Daily Rounds" show and anchored two unprecedented 10-hour live television specials on childbirth for the Discovery Health Channel.

=== NJPBS ===
She most recently served as the anchor of NJTV News on New Jersey's public television network, NJTV, from July 2014 to March 2020 (with her announcement of stepping down as anchor the following month in April 2020).

She is also an associate professor of Journalism at SUNY Purchase. and was previously an adjunct professor at Seton Hall University.

=== Ethics reporting ===
For WNET, In the wake of the September 11th terrorist attacks, she wrote and hosted a 3-hour PBS special Reaching Out to Heal. She also hosted a companion program to Bill Moyers' On Our Own Terms, about death and dying, which aired in Fall 2000 on PBS. As host of Hallmark's weekly True North program on personal ethics, Williams earned the 2001 Gracie Allen Award and the 2001 Donald McGannon Ethics in Media Award. Her 90-minute PBS special on alcoholism and addiction, Within Reach, along with her continuing work as a PBS contributing correspondent and anchor on Religion & Ethics Newsweekly have established Williams as a significant reporter on broad issues of ethics.

=== Women's and family reporting ===
One of the highest rated documentaries ever broadcast on Lifetime Television, Picture What Women Do, about women, work and the American family was written and hosted by Williams. That program won the 1995 Exceptional Merit Media Award given by the National Women's Political Caucus. Williams has continued to be a leading voice on the impact of public policy on the American family. In 1995, she appeared in 38 television spots for ABC affiliate stations about women's health issues as part of Women's Health Alliance and Hearst TV. Also for Hearst, she hosted a 40-part Our Show series about issues facing the baby-boom generation. Williams also hosted States of Faith, an NBC Television special on religion in America.

=== CBS career ===
She has been a writer for the CBS Evening News with Katie Couric and reporter/anchor at WCBS Radio.

=== Literary career and children's reporting ===
A published author, Williams adapted her weekly interview program for the Hallmark Channel about strategies for overcoming life's toughest challenges into a book, Quiet Triumphs, published by HarperCollins. As part of the National Cable Television Associations (NCTA) week devoted to programming for and about children, Williams wrote and hosted a television special on children which aired in June 1998.

=== Programming development ===
Williams has produced and hosted programming for next generation platforms including interactive television and web-based journalism. For INEXTV.com, she developed an interactive show about business and finance in the entrepreneurial spirit and a business series called Amazing Women. For Centerseat.com, she developed a multimedia program in conjunction with Borders Books on reading, writing and literacy.

=== Pre-CNN career ===
Prior to joining CNN in 1979, Williams was a reporter and anchor at WNBC-TV, the NBC flagship station in New York. As special assignment correspondent, she covered the 1974 and 1978 United States Senate elections and the 1976 Democratic Convention and presidential election. She joined WNBC in 1974. Williams went to WNBC from WPIX in New York where, at age 23, she served as executive producer of news programming. Previously, she was executive producer at KSTP-TV in Minneapolis, Minnesota where she started her career as a reporter at age 18.

=== Special and guest appearances ===
Mary Alice Williams has made appearances on top-rated national television programs including Nightline, CNN's Crossfire, The Tonight Show, The Tom Snyder Show and Murphy Brown.

=== NJTV News ===
She became the anchor of NJTV News starting on July 1, 2014, replacing Mike Schneider. After about six years in that role, she announced on the April 27, 2020 broadcast of the show that she would be leaving NJTV. When making that announcement, she had been absent since March 13, 2020 to help care for some of her family members who were having health problems.

== Board service ==
From 1993 to 1999, Williams was a Trustee of the March of Dimes Birth Defects Foundation. She has served as Broadcast Chair for Women in Communications and Mass Media Chair for the National Council of Women. She was also a member of the Board of Trustees at Fordham University from 1987 to 1993. She is currently a board member of the Women in Communications Foundation and an advisor to the New York Foundling.

== Honorary awards ==
Williams has received fourteen honorary doctorates for her outstanding contributions to journalism and television.

- '84 St. John's University
- '85 The Kings College
- '85 Georgian Court College
- '88 Marymount College
- '89 Glassboro State College
- '90 Molloy College
- '90 Mercy College
- '91 Wittenberg University
- '92 Seton Hall University
- '92 La Salle University
- '95 The College of St. Elizabeth
- '96 Mount Saint Mary College
- '06 Dominican College
- '06 Iona College
- '15 Bloomfield College

== Awards received ==
- 2004 – Gracie Allen Award from American Women in Radio and Television for Magdalene, a PBS program on the mystery of Mary Magdalene
- 2000 – Angel Award, International Film festival Award and the Donald McGannon Ethics in Media Award
- 1999 – Sigma Delta Chi Award for her Religion & Ethics Newsweekly feature on the ethics of saving profoundly premature infants
- Inducted into the National Jesuit Honor Society, Alpha Sigma Nu
- 1998 – Gracie Allen Award from American Women in Radio & Television for reporting on strides toward equality being made by Orthodox Jewish women
- 1996 – Freddie Award from the American Medical Association
- 1995 – Exceptional Merit Media Award and the Ellis Island Medal of Honor
- EFFY Award from the American Marketing Association
- 1992 – American Bar Association bestowed on her its Silver Gavel Award
- 1990 – National Commendation Award from American Women in Radio and Television
- 1989 – National Emmy Awards as anchor of NBC Nightly News during the Romanian Revolution
- 1988 – CableACE Award nominee and Women in Cable presented her with its prestigious Woman of the Year Award
- 1986 – Headliner Award from Women in Communications
- 1985 – The Matrix (a lifetime achievement award)
- Appointed Admiral in the Nebraska Navy
- 1983 – Williams was an ACE nominee, won the New Cinema Artists Award and was named Young Woman Achiever by the YWCA
- 1980 – Young Achievers Award from the National Council of Women, an award she shared with the first woman astronaut Sally Ride.
- 2017 - Inducted into the Silver Circle, National Academy of Television Arts and Sciences.

2025- Inducted into the New Jersey Hall of Fame.
