= Today (American TV program) =

American news and talk television show

- Also known as: The Today Show
- Genre: Morning; News; Talk
- Created by: Pat Weaver
- Presented by: Savannah Guthrie; Craig Melvin; Al Roker; Carson Daly; Jenna Bush Hager; Third Hour: Craig Melvin; Dylan Dreyer; Al Roker; Jenna and Sheinelle: Jenna Bush Hager; Sheinelle Jones; Saturday: Laura Jarrett; Carson Daly; Joe Fryer; Angie Lassman; Sunday: Willie Geist; (See full list)
- Narrated by: Fred Facey; Les Marshak
- Theme music composer: Les Brown (1952–1961); Django Reinhardt (1962–1963); Erroll Garner (1963–1971); Ray Ellis (1971–1985); John Williams (1985–2013); Adam Gubman (2013–present)
- Opening theme: Today (2013–present)
- Ending theme: "Energetic Today" "Slow Today"
- Composers: Adam Gubman & Non-Stop Music
- Country of origin: United States
- Original language: English
- No. of seasons: 74
- No. of episodes: 27,000+

Production
- Executive producer: Tom Mazzarelli
- Production locations: Studio 1A, NBC Studios; New York City, U.S.
- Camera setup: Multi-camera
- Running time: 4 hours (weekdays), 60 or 90 minutes (Saturdays), 1 hour (Sundays)
- Production company: NBC News Productions

Original release
- Network: NBC
- Release: January 14, 1952 – present

Related
- Early Today; Weekend Today; Today with Jenna & Sheinelle

Today (also called The Today Show) is an American morning television show that airs weekdays from 7:00 a.m. to 11:00 a.m. on NBC. The program debuted on January 14, 1952. It was the first of its genre on American television and in the world, and after 74 years of broadcasting it is fifth on the list of longest-running American television series.

Originally a two-hour program airing weekdays from 7:00 a.m. to 9:00 a.m., it expanded to Sundays in 1987 and Saturdays in 1992. The weekday broadcast expanded to three hours in 2000, and to four hours in 2007 (though over time, the third and fourth hours became distinct entities). Today's dominance was virtually unchallenged by the other networks until the late 1980s, when it was overtaken by ABC's Good Morning America.

Today retook the Nielsen TV ratings lead the week of December 11, 1995, and held onto that position for 852 consecutive weeks until the week of April 9, 2012, when Good Morning America topped it again. Today maintained its No. 2 status behind GMA from the summer of 2012 until it regained the lead in the aftermath of anchor Matt Lauer's departure in November 2017. In 2002, Today was ranked No. 17 on TV Guide's 50 Greatest TV Shows of All Time.

The entertainment magazine Variety reported that 2016 advertising revenue during the first two hours of the show was $508.8 million.

On July 15, 2020, NBC launched Today All Day, a 24-hour digital streaming extension of the program available through its website and Peacock.

== History ==
=== Founding ===
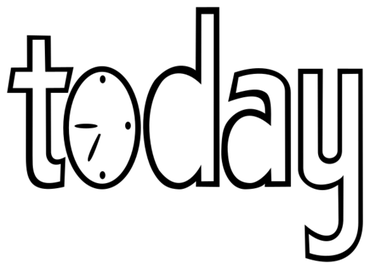
First Today logo, used from 1952 to 1960

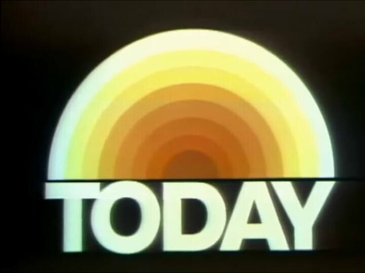
First variant of the current logo, introduced in 1974

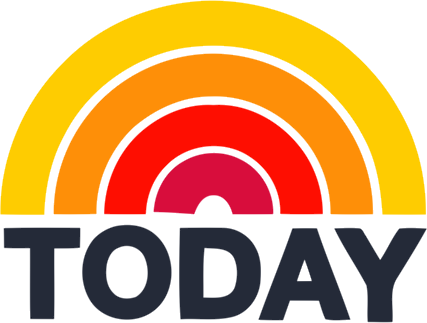
Logo used from 2009 to 2013

Plain version of the current Today logo

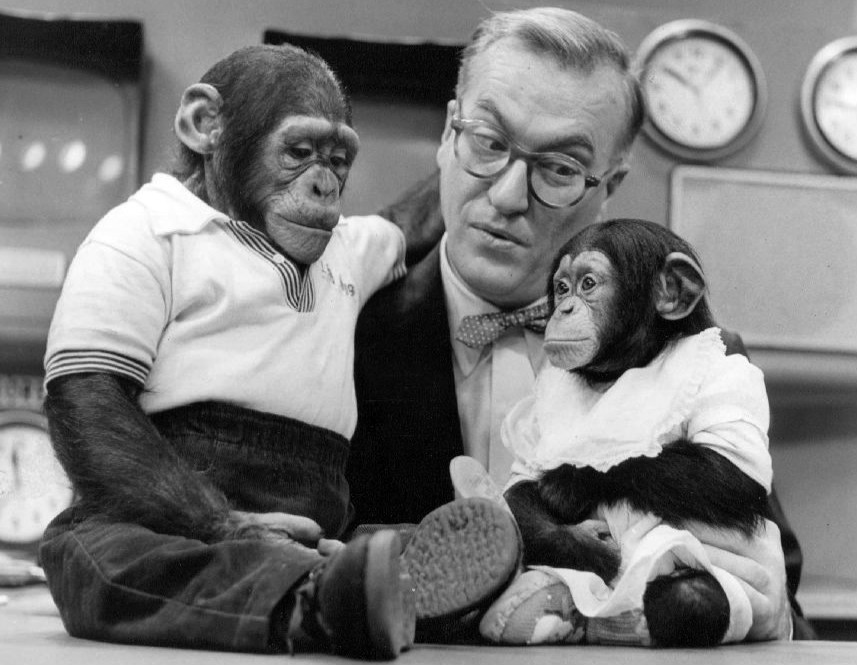
Original host Dave Garroway, with mascot J. Fred Muggs (and companion) in 1954

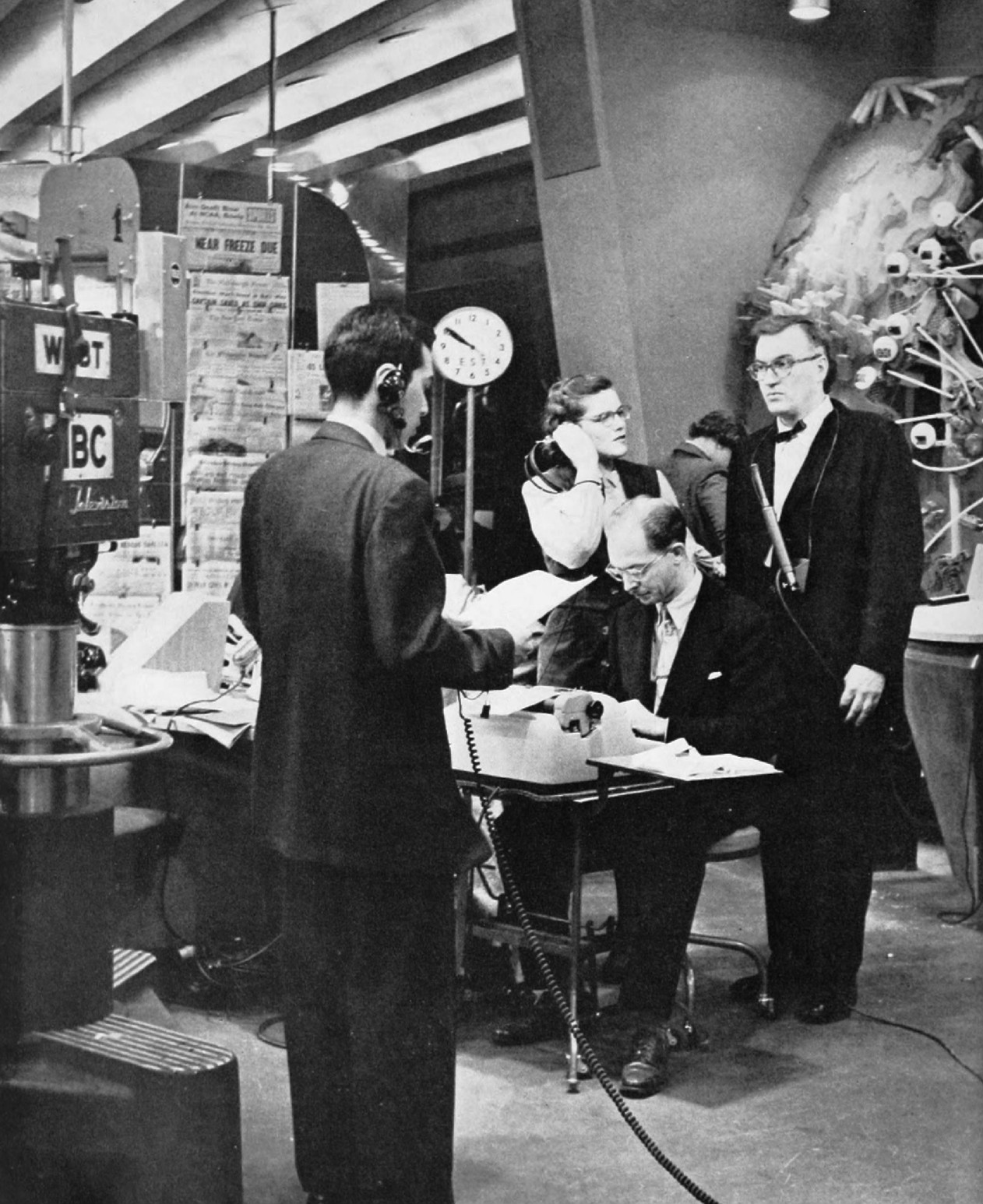
The set in January 1952

The show's first broadcast aired on January 14, 1952, as the brainchild of television executive Sylvester "Pat" Weaver, who was then vice president of NBC. Weaver became president of the company from 1953 to 1956, during which time Today's late-night companion The Tonight Show premiered. In pre-production, the show's proposed working title was The Rise and Shine Revue. The show was first supervised by Jerome Alan Danzig.

Today was the first program of its genre when it premiered with original host Dave Garroway. The program blended national news headlines, interviews with newsmakers, lifestyle features, other light news and gimmicks (including the presence of the chimpanzee J. Fred Muggs who served as the show's mascot during the early years), and local news updates from the network's stations.

National availability of the program expanded gradually during the 1950s. As late as January 1955, the show was not yet carried in markets such as Denver; the network feed had not extended west of Omaha until the autumn of 1954. At that time, to reach the Mountain Time Zone, the signal was transmitted to the West Coast, kinescoped, and then distributed to affiliates in cities like Salt Lake City.

It has spawned several other shows of a similar type, including ABC's Good Morning America, and CBS' now-defunct The Early Show. In other countries, the format was copied – most notably in the United Kingdom with the BBC's BBC Breakfast and ITV's Good Morning Britain, and in Canada with Your Morning on CTV Television Network.

=== Scheduling history ===
When Today debuted, it was seen live only in the Eastern Time Zone and Central Time Zone, broadcasting for three hours each morning but seen for only two hours in each time zone. Since 1958, Today has only broadcast live on the Eastern Time Zone, and has been on broadcast delay for the five other U.S. time zones (Central, Mountain Time Zone, Pacific Time Zone, Alaska Time Zone and Hawaii–Aleutian Time Zone). Partly to accommodate host Dave Garroway's declining health, the program ceased live broadcasts in September 1959, opting instead to broadcast an edition taped the previous afternoon punctuated with live newscasts each half-hour. The experiment, which drew criticism from many sides, ended when John Chancellor succeeded Garroway in July 1961.

Today's weekday version was a two-hour program for 48 years, airing from 7:00 a.m. to 9:00 a.m. in all time zones except for Alaska, Hawaii, and the U.S. Virgin Islands, until NBC expanded the program to three hours (extending the program until 10:00 a.m.) on October 2, 2000. A fourth hour (which extended the program until 11:00 a.m.) was eventually added on September 10, 2007.

In August 2013, Today released a mobile app for smartphones and tablets.

== Current weekday showtimes and arrangements ==
The program airs live in the Eastern Time Zone, and on tape delay beginning at 7:00 a.m., in each of the remaining time zones. In markets that serve both Eastern and Central Time, such as Columbus, GA where several Alabama counties are served, the program airs live at 6:00 a.m. Central Time. The remaining three feeds are frequently updated with minor fixes and repairs, and often, correspondents will tape updates that are then edited into the delayed feeds. NBC affiliates in some markets including on the East Coast, such as WESH in Orlando, Florida, air the third and fourth hours of Today on tape delay to accommodate live syndicated programs airing at such times.

When breaking news stories warrant, Today will produce a West Coast edition by broadcasting parts of the show live for viewers there. In such an event, the live portion does not typically go beyond the 7:00 a.m. (Pacific Time) half-hour or the bloc before the first set of advertisements. Once completed, the remaining blocs/segments taped from the East Coast edition will follow. Throughout the live segment, the presenters will explicitly make some reference to the show being live on the west coast from time to time until the tape-delayed segments resume.

In some instances, when an NBC News Special Report of breaking news or a live event occurs during the Today show time slot in the eastern time zone, the show's anchors will assume hosting responsibilities and the show will go live across all time zones until such time when the Special Report segment finishes. At that point, viewers outside the Eastern Time Zone will return to regularly scheduled programming (i.e. the segment of the Today show feed already in progress in their corresponding time zone or their local newscast).

=== Local cut-ins ===
During the first two hours of the program, local network affiliates are offered a four-minute window at 26 and 56 minutes past the hour to insert a local newsbreak (which usually also includes a local forecast, and in large and mid-sized markets, a brief traffic report) and local advertisements. Certain NBC affiliates that produce an additional morning newscast for a sister station or digital subchannel may prerecord the local inserts aired during the first one to two hours of Today to focus production responsibilities on just one of their local channels.

=== Satellite radio simulcast ===
Starting in June 2014, SiriusXM began simulcasting Today on a new channel called Today Show Radio, Channel 110, with The Best of Today starting at 6 am (Eastern) and the Today Show's live broadcast from Studio 1A at Rockefeller Center in New York City starting at 7:00 a.m. (Eastern), with a tape-delayed broadcast beginning at 7:00 a.m. Pacific time. On Tuesdays, Off the Rails with Al Roker, Dylan Dreyer and Sheinelle Jones airs at 1:00 p.m. (Eastern). On Wednesdays, The Happy Hour with the producers of Jenna & Friends airs, and on Thursdays, Today Show Confidential with the producers of TODAY airs. The channel also simulcasts NBC Nightly News with Tom Llamas at 6:30 p.m. (Eastern) The Today Show Radio service is not currently available on SiriusXM's sister service in Canada and Channel 110 is locked out for Canadian subscribers.

== Studio ==
=== RCA Exhibition Hall (original studio) ===
The Today program first originated from the RCA Exhibition Hall on 49th Street in Manhattan in a space now occupied by the Christie's auction house, just down the block from the present-day studio. The first set placed a functional newsroom in the studio, which Garroway called "the nerve center of the world." The barrier between backstage and on-stage was virtually nonexistent. Garroway and the on-air staff often walked through the newsroom set. Glimpses of the camera crew and technicians were a frequent occurrence, as were off-screen voices conversing with Garroway. Gradually, machines and personnel were placed behind the scenes to assemble the news and weather reports, and the newsroom was gone by 1955.

=== Studio 3K, Florida Showcase, Studio 8G, and Studio 3B ===
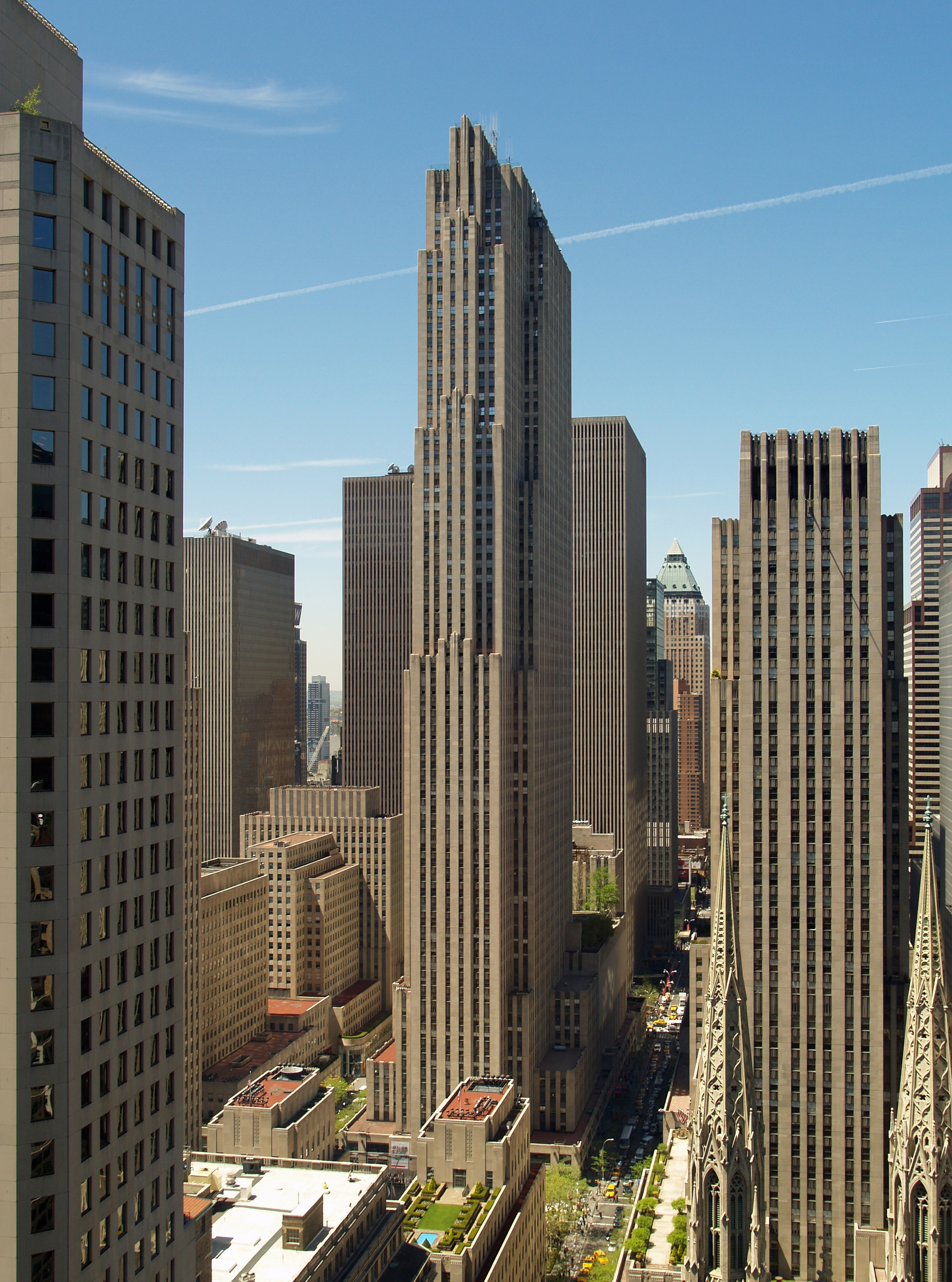
Today is broadcast from Studio 1A in 10 Rockefeller Plaza, to the left of 30 Rockefeller Plaza

In the summer of 1958, television manufacturer Philco complained to NBC that staging Today in a studio explicitly called the RCA Exhibition Hall was unfair (RCA owned NBC at the time). The network bowed to the pressure, and on July 7, 1958, Today moved across the street to Studio 3K in the RCA Building, where it remained through the early 1960s.

On July 9, 1962, the program returned to a street-side studio in the space then occupied by the Florida Showcase. Each day, the Today production crew would have to move the Florida-related tourism merchandise off the floor and wheel in the Today news set, desks, chairs and cameras. When the show wrapped at 9:00 a.m. Eastern Time, the news set would be put away and the tourism merchandise returned to the floor.

After three years in the Florida Showcase, Today moved back to the RCA Building on September 13, 1965. The network converted its news programming to all-color broadcasts at that time, and NBC could not justify allocating four (then-expensive) color cameras to the Florida Showcase studio. For the next 20 years, the show occupied a series of studios on the third, sixth, and eighth floors of NBC's headquarters; most notably Studio 3K in the 1970s, Studio 8G (adjacent to Studio 8H, home to Saturday Night Live; also the current home of Late Night with Seth Meyers) in the late 1970s and early 1980s, and finally Studio 3B from 1983 to 1994.

=== Studio 1A ===
Today moved to the new street-side studio on June 20, 1994, providing a link to the show's 1950s origin.

Since the debut of the 1990s set, the national morning news programs of each of the major broadcast and cable-news networks have moved street-side – including two of Today's Rockefeller Center neighbors, Fox News' Fox & Friends (at Sixth Avenue) and CNN's since-cancelled American Morning (in the summer of 2005, CNN reversed the trend, abandoning its street-level studio and moving upstairs in the Time Warner Center at Columbus Circle). ABC's Good Morning America was formerly broadcast from Disney's Times Square Studios, but moved to studios at 7 Hudson Square in downtown Manhattan in 2025.

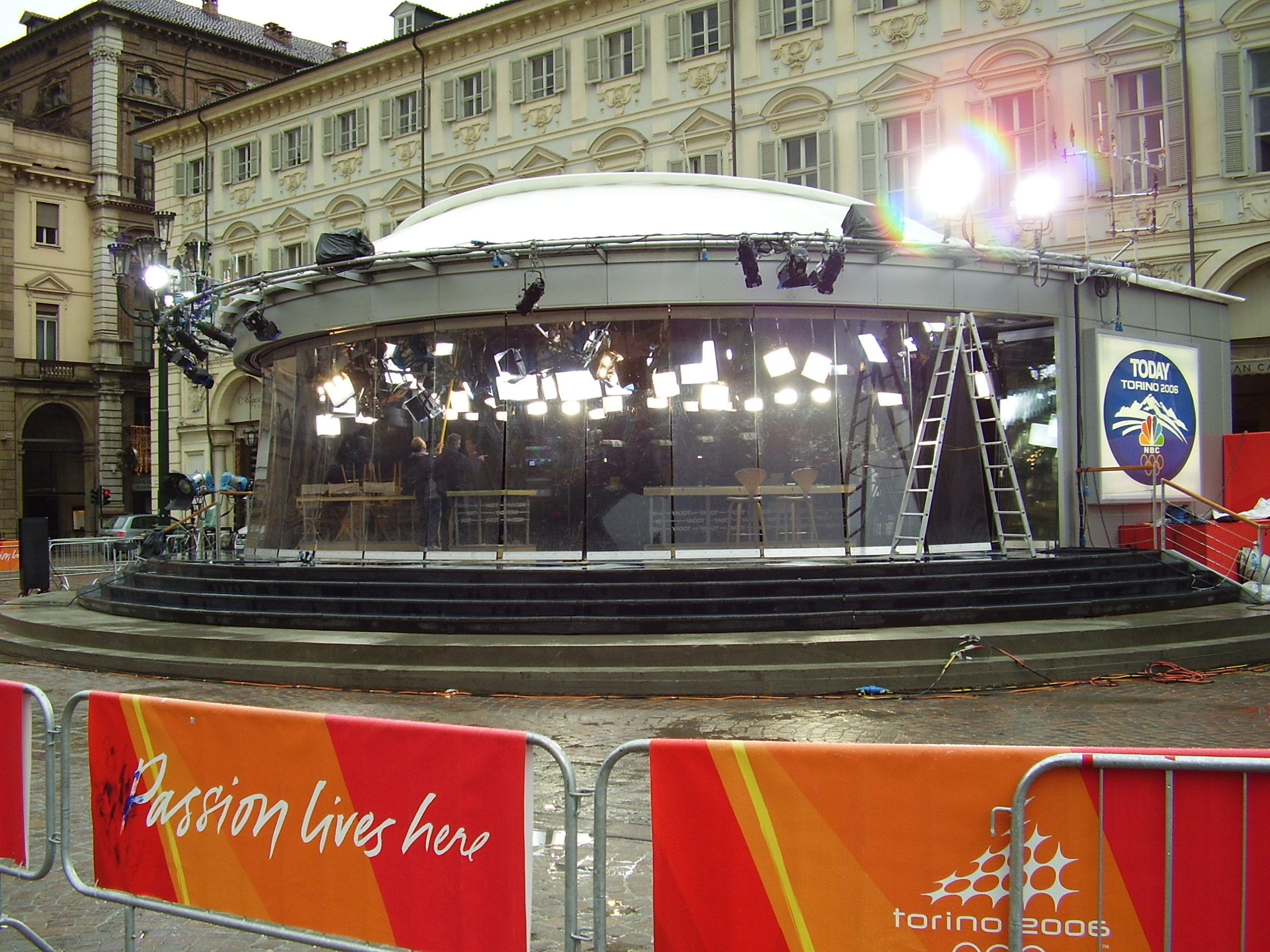
The outdoor studio at the Torino Winter Olympic Games, 2006

In 2006, Studio 1A underwent a major renovation to prepare for the upgrade to high-definition television broadcasts. After the departure of Katie Couric and while a new set was readied (during the summer of 2006), the program was broadcast from a temporary outdoor studio in Rockefeller Plaza, the same set that NBC used at the Olympic Games since 2004. During the week of August 28, 2006, the show was moved to a temporary location outside of Studio 1A because MTV was converting the outdoor studio into their red carpet booth for the 2006 MTV Video Music Awards. A mock set was set up in Dateline NBC's studio, which was also used during inclement weather. The program also used a temporary outdoor set at NBC Studios, and MSNBC's Countdown with Keith Olbermann (which joined at Studio 1A in 30 Rock on October 22, 2007).

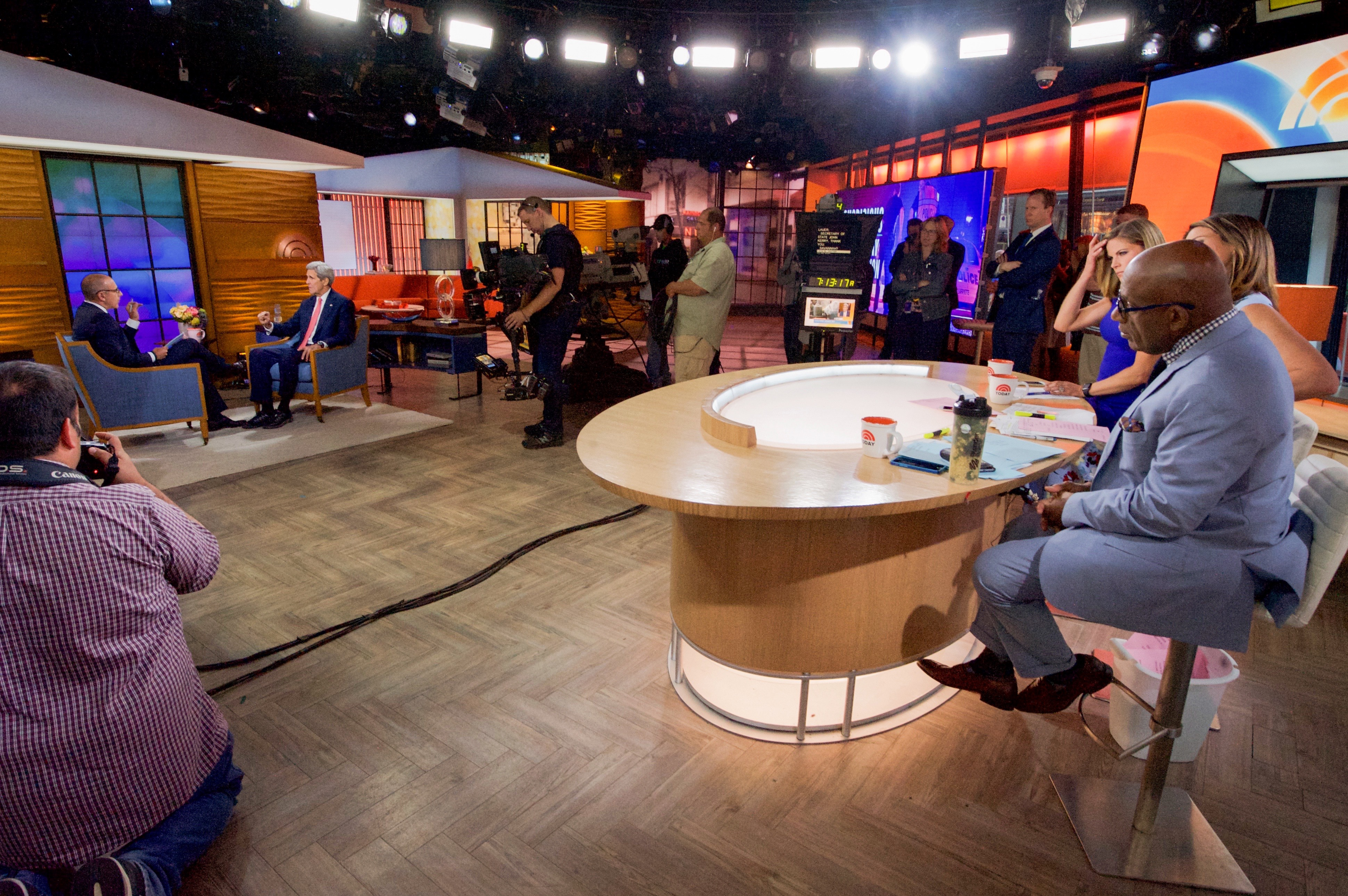
Today set in 2015

On September 13, 2006, Today moved back into the revamped Studio 1A space. The new studio was divided into five different sections on the lower level including an interview area, the couch area, the news desk, the performance/interview/extra space area, and home base, which is where the anchors start the show. A gigantic Panasonic 103-inch plasma display monitor is often used for graphic display backgrounds. A kitchen set is located upstairs from the main studio. The blue background that is seen in the opening of the show in home base moves up and down to allow a view of the outside from the home base.

Some minor changes were implemented throughout the early and middle part of 2013, not only in the way that things are presented, but also with modified graphics and minor updates to the set. That year, a new, larger anchor desk was introduced with space to seat all four main anchors (Guthrie, Lauer, Morales and Roker). The new desk brought an end to the "news desk", as the third "news reader" (Morales) now sits at the main anchor desk. Other minor changes included a new larger desk for the third hour. After the August 16, 2013, broadcast, the program vacated Studio 1A, while the space underwent a remodeling with a more modern look with (as stated by executive producer Don Nash) "a lot more bells and whistles to play with."

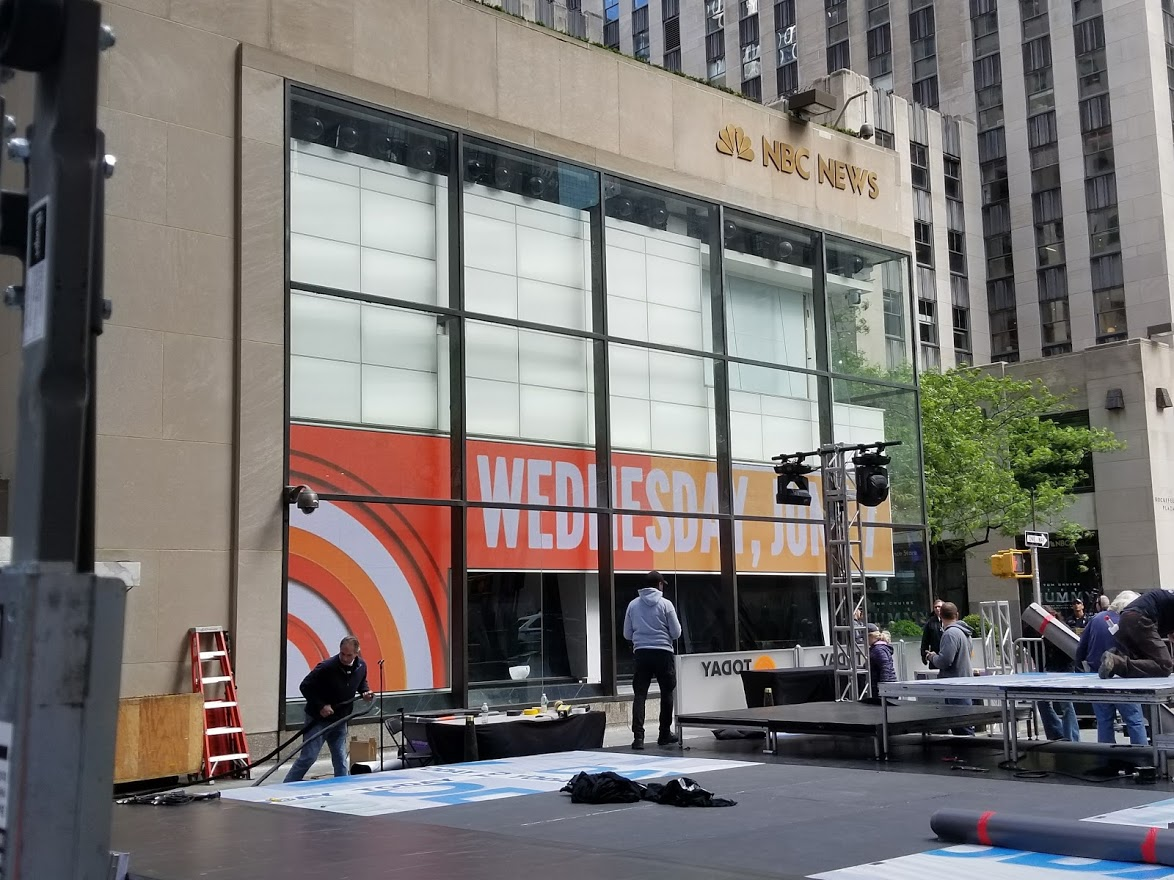
Studio 1A in 2017 showcasing the 6' x 16' screen

On September 16, 2013, Today debuted a new set and graphics package (it was originally set to debut on September 9, 2013, but was delayed one week to complete final design details). The "home base" is located on a platform that can spin 360°, therefore allowing the view and direction of the camera to change depending on the half-hour. A new couch and background was added in the "sofa area" (where the anchors sit and discuss topics). A social media area known as the "Orange Room", was also added to Studio 1A, which contains screens that display Twitter comments or trending topics, Carson Daly was hired to present segments from the room during the broadcast. Six screens that also connect to one 6' x 16' screen were added in the fashion/special topic area. During its first two days of use, the show transitioned away from its news and entertainment format to a format that emphasized the social interaction of the anchors, Roker and newsreader.

The graphics were also overhauled with introduction of the new set (a slightly modified version of this package and the revised logo debuted on Early Today that November, further integrating the early-morning news program's branding with Today). The logo-to-peacock animation was moved from the left corner to the bottom right side corner of the screen. The logo that was first previewed on September 13, 2013, pared down the number of circular arches from five to three with its coloring switching from different variations – generally shades of red, orange and yellow to depict a sunrise – to entirely orange.

In September 2015, Today updated the set once again, the update included new floors, a new couch, and a new anchor desk. The new set retains the 360 home base used in the previous design. The new set replaced much of the dark wood colors with lighter colors and removed the emphasis of orange in previous design in favor of orange accents.

In February 2018, while Guthrie and Kotb were at the 2018 Winter Olympics, the studio underwent major changes including a new curved 40 ft video wall and flooring in the former screen area as well as a large Today logo installation; and by November of the same year, the Orange Room got a minor change that included a triangular-pattern wall and wooden flooring. Then, in November 2020, ahead of Election Night coverage, a new large video wall was added in front of the Orange Room (ending the Orange Room as a studio space in Studio 1A). This video wall is used primarily for the weather forecasts but also other pieces of the show.

== On-air staff ==
=== Weekdays ===
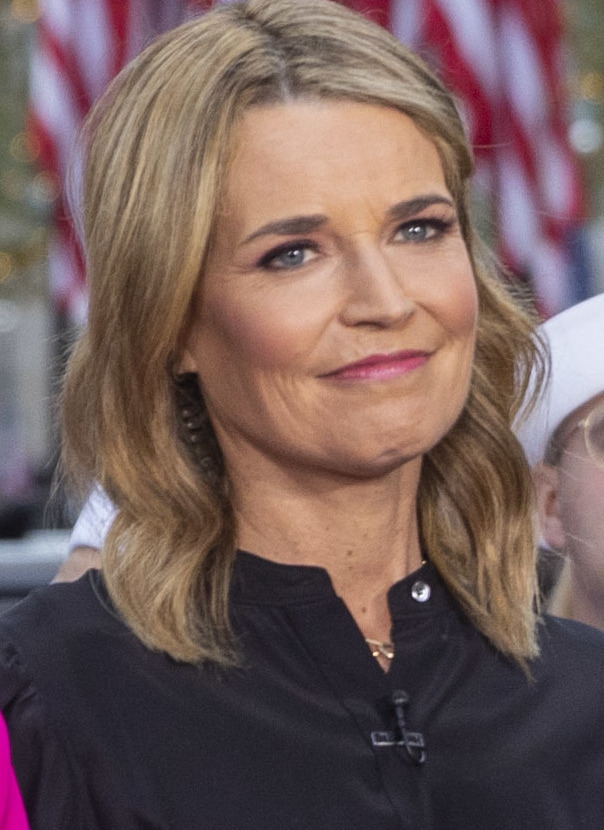
Savannah Guthrie - co-anchor

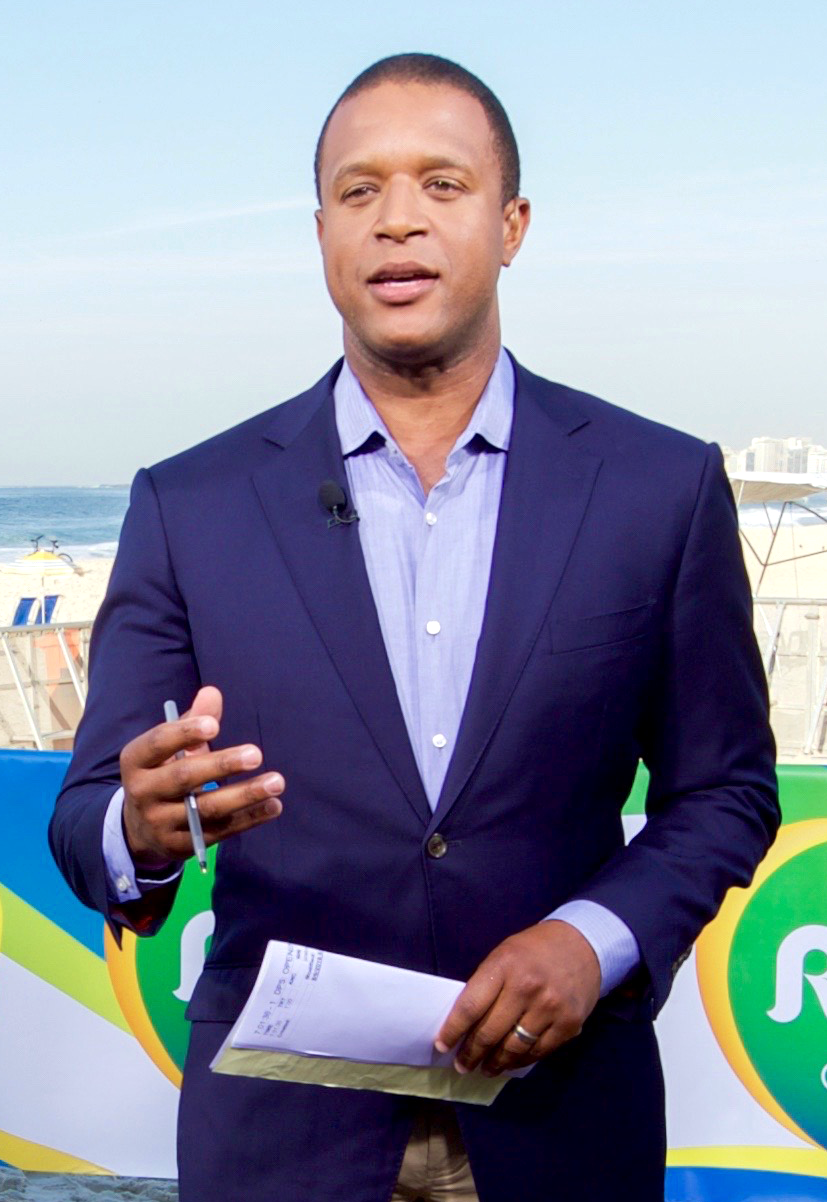
Craig Melvin - co-anchor; 3rd Hour co-host

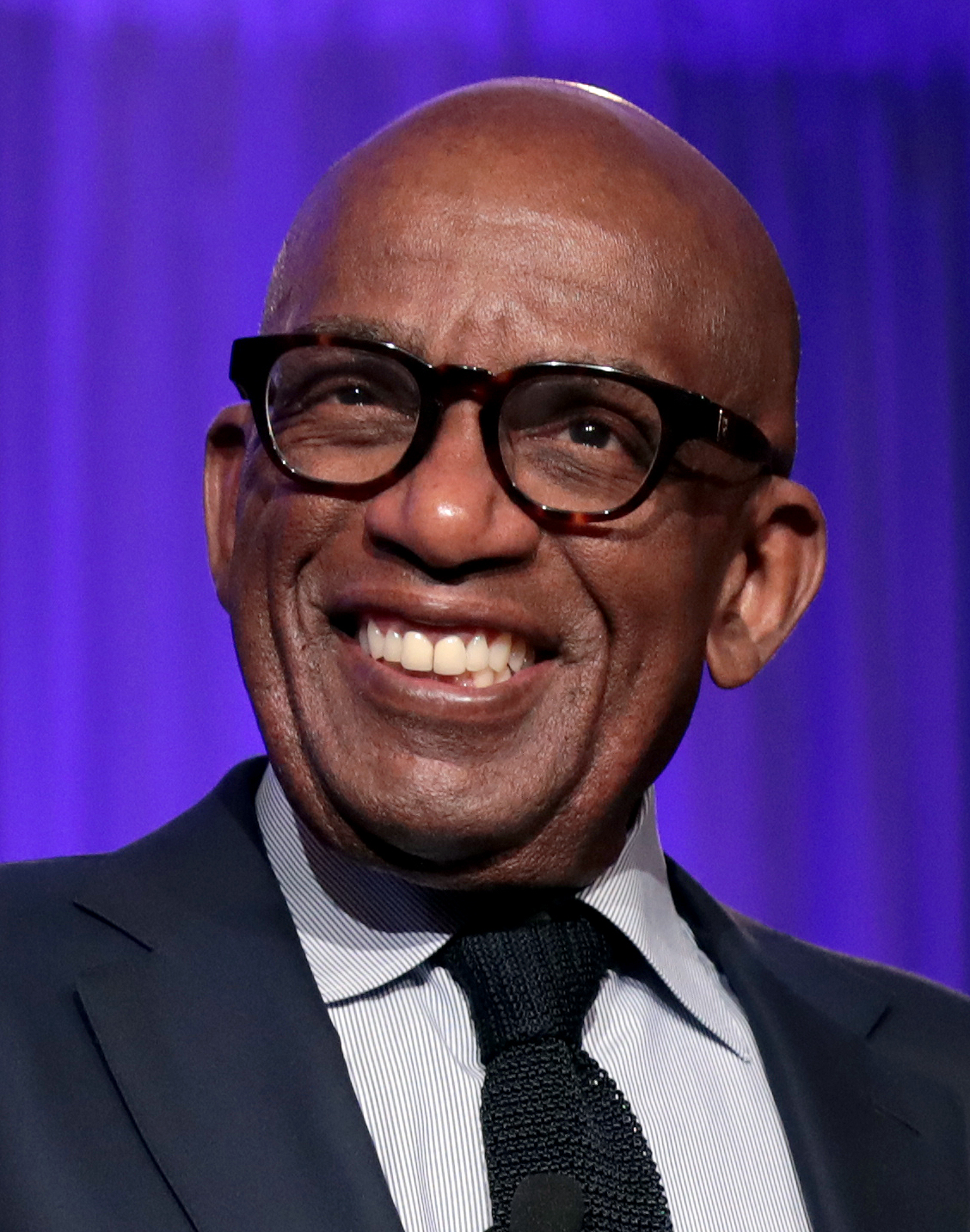
Al Roker - weather and features anchor; 3rd Hour co-host

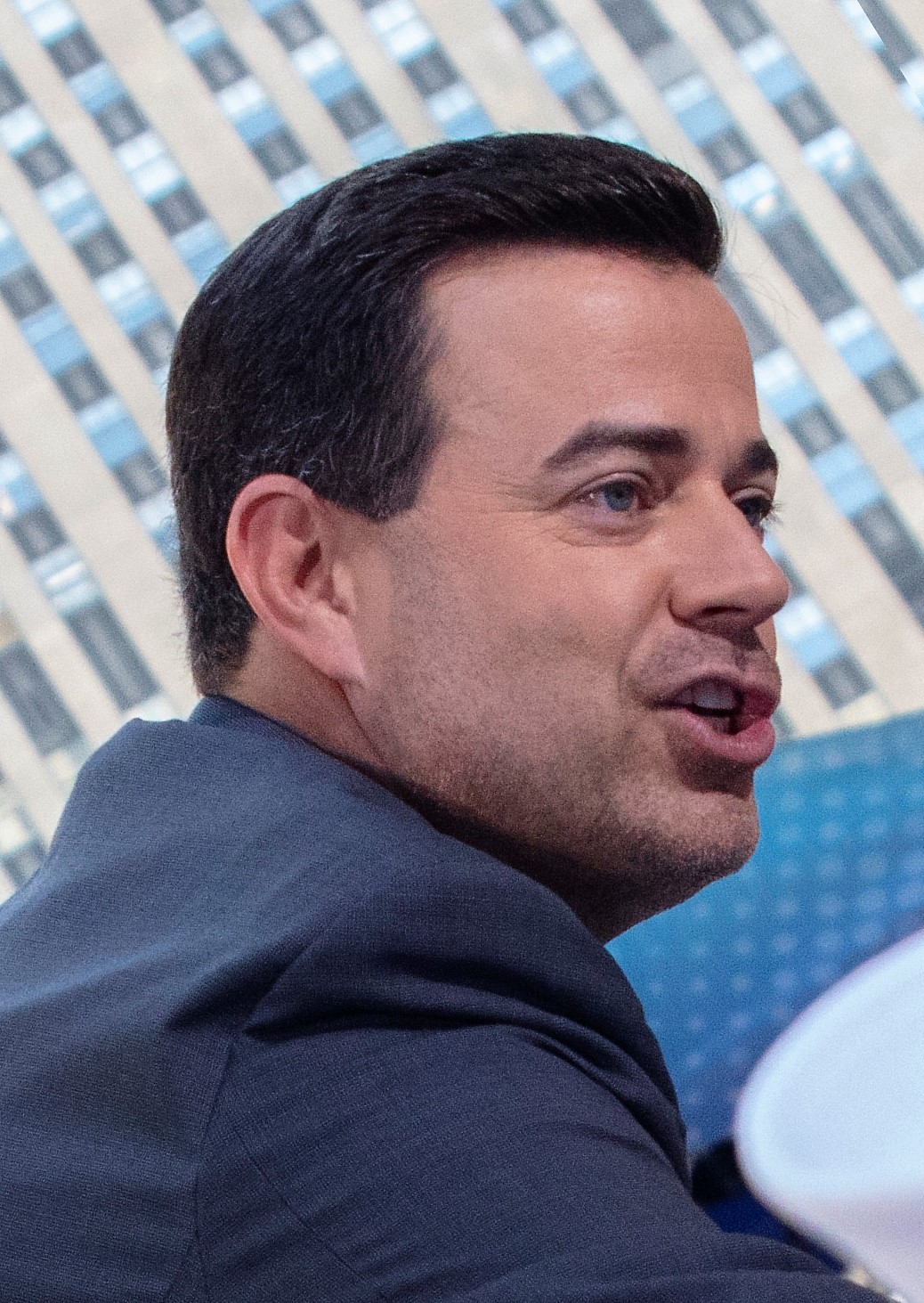
Carson Daly - feature anchor

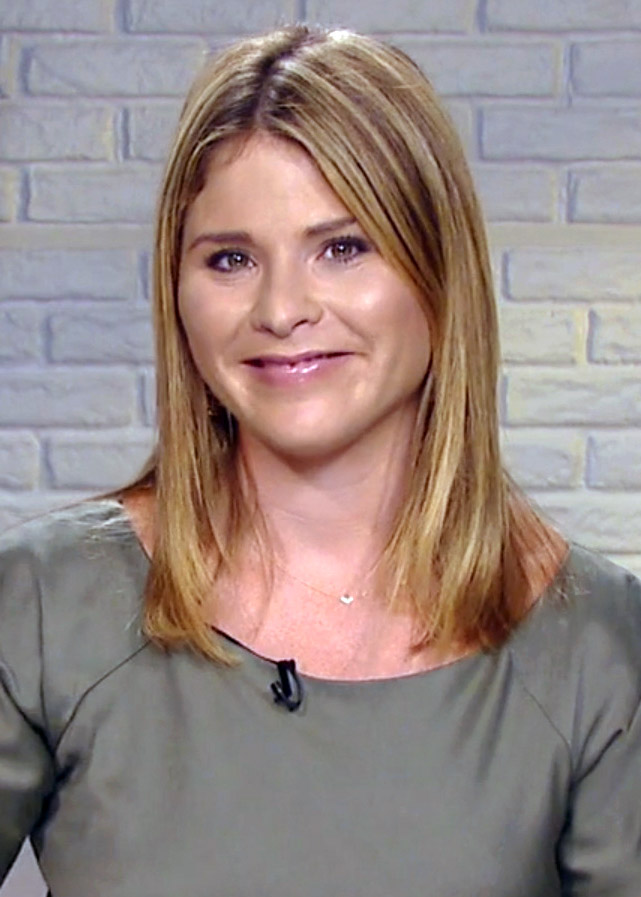
Jenna Bush Hager - "Morning Boost" anchor; fourth hour co-host (Jenna & Sheinelle)
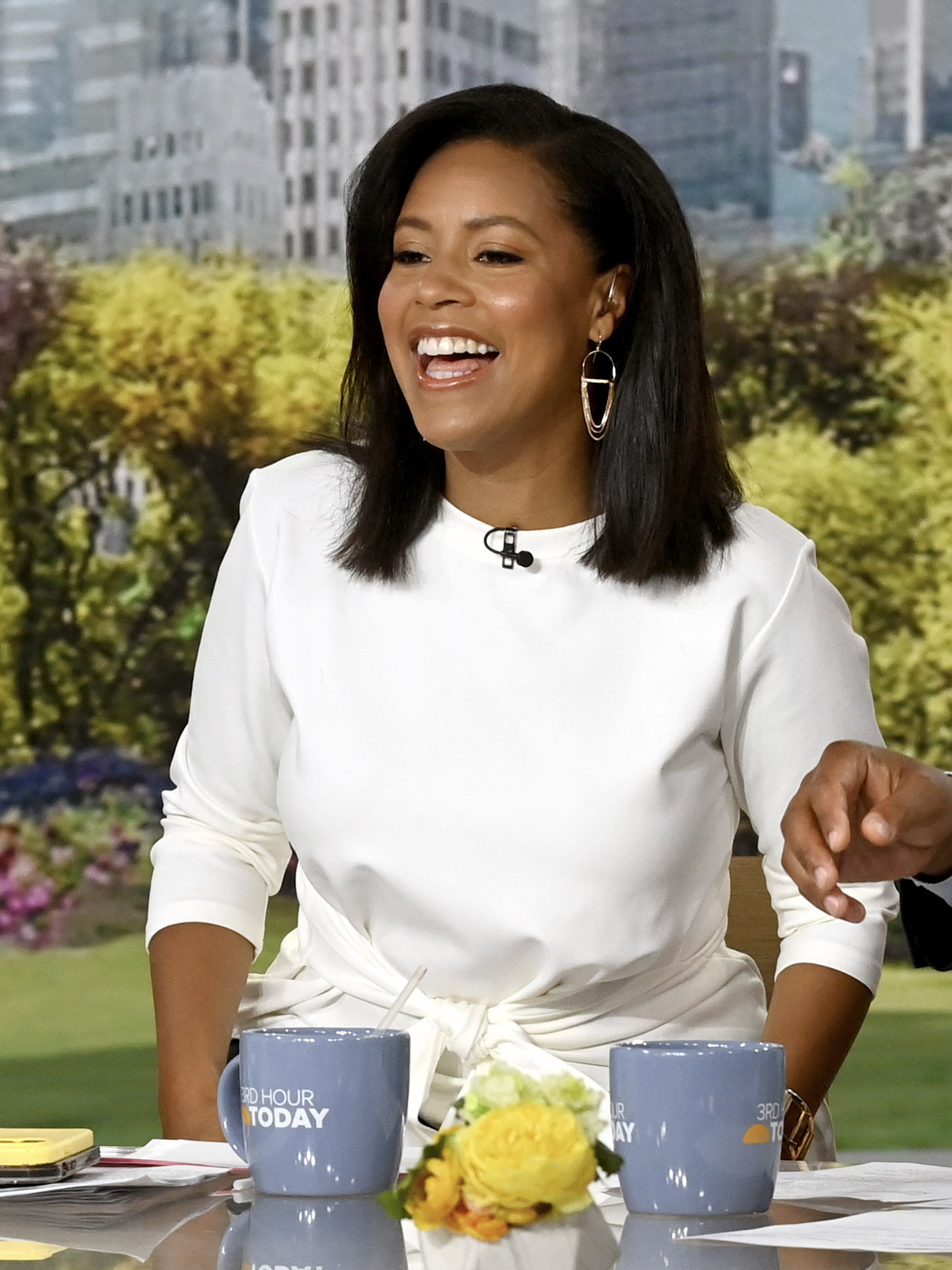
Sheinelle Jones - fourth hour co-host (Jenna & Sheinelle)

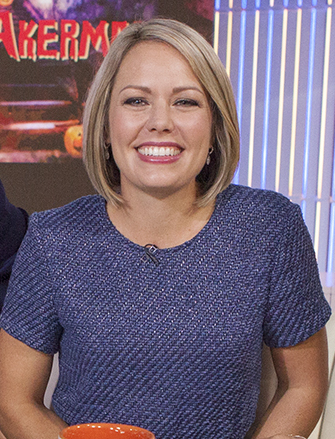
Dylan Dreyer - 3rd Hour co-host

==== Main show ====
During the week, the flagship hours of Today (7:00 a.m. – 9:00 a.m.) are co-anchored by Savannah Guthrie (2012–present) and Craig Melvin (2025–present) alongside co-hosts Al Roker (weather and features anchor 1996–present), Carson Daly (features anchor 2013–present), and Jenna Bush Hager ("Morning Boost" features anchor)

==== Third hour ====
Dylan Dreyer – who appears on the main show as a contributor – serves as the co-host (with Roker and Melvin) of 3rd Hour Today at 9:00 a.m.

==== Fourth hour ====
Jenna Bush Hager and Sheinelle Jones co-host the fourth hour– titled Today with Jenna & Sheinelle – at 10:00 a.m.

- Note: 3rd Hour Today and Jenna & Sheinelle – while considered extensions of the Today show – are their own distinct entities and are listed as such.

=== Weekends ===
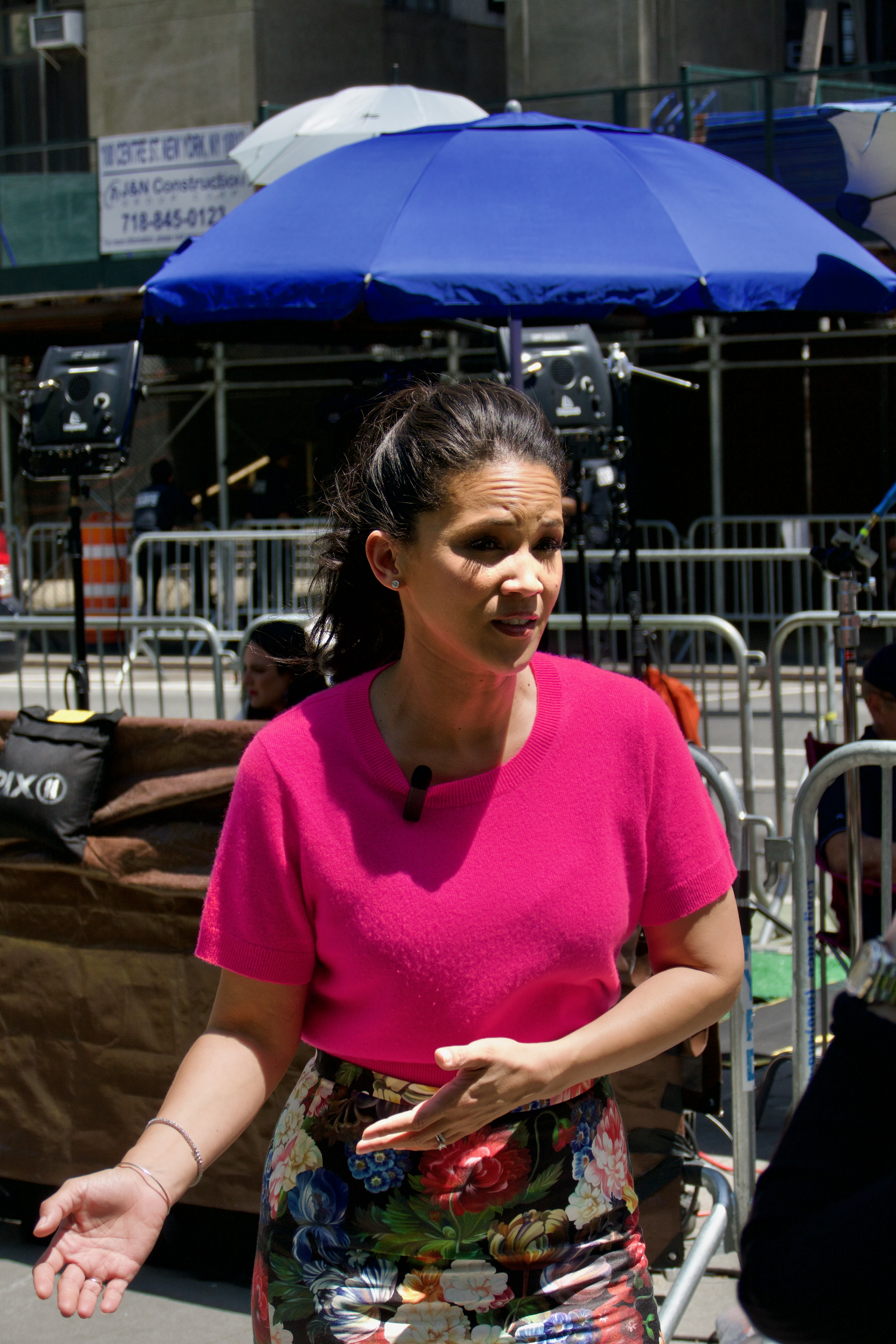
Laura Jarrett - Saturday co-anchor; NBC News senior legal correspondent

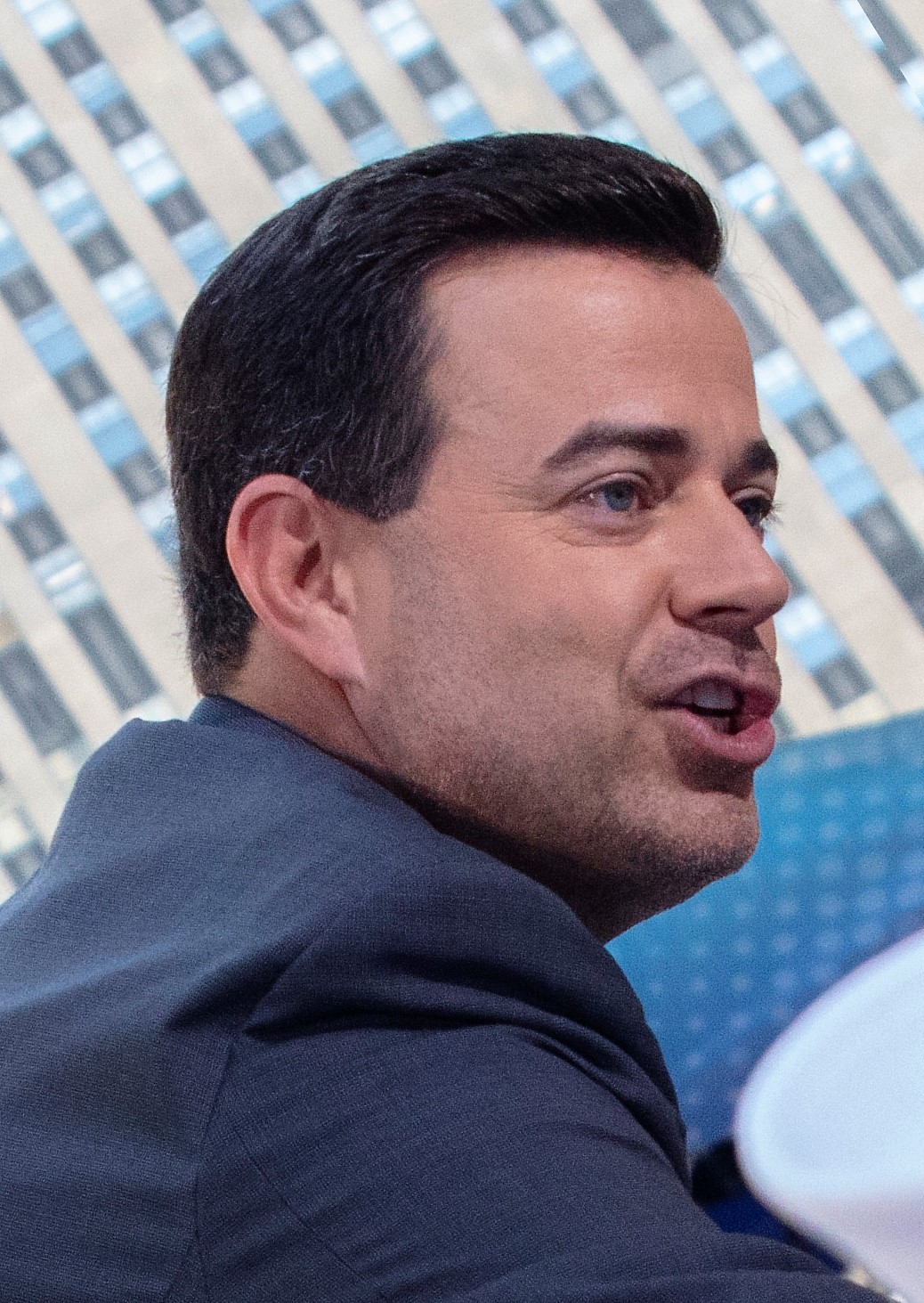
Carson Daly - Saturday co-anchor

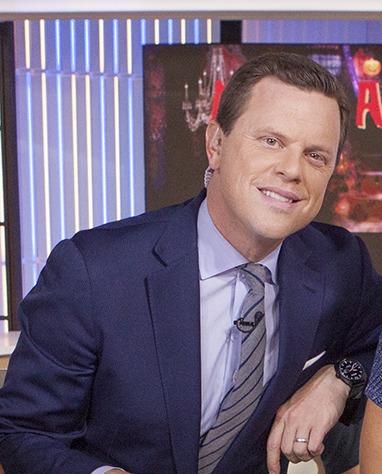
Willie Geist - Sunday Today anchor

Weekend editions of Today include Saturday Today co-anchored by Laura Jarrett and Carson Daly, Joe Fryer (features anchor) and Angie Lassman (weather anchor), and Sunday Today solo anchored by Willie Geist.

=== Former staff ===
Today anchors were termed "Communicators" at the program's inception. Creator Pat Weaver envisioned a person whose responsibilities would go beyond the bounds of traditional sit-down news anchors. The Communicator would interview, report, moderate dialogue and generally tie the show together into a coherent whole. Garroway and his successors have all followed that model, with little variation. Now, the hosts are expected to do much the same, and on any given day will talk with correspondents, newsmakers and lifestyle experts; introduce and close each half-hour, conduct special segments (such as cooking or fashion) and go on-assignment to host the program from different locations. Although the "Communicator" nomenclature has since fallen out of favor, the job remains largely the same.

==== Anchors ====
Including Savannah Guthrie and Craig Melvin, nine men and eight women have served as primary Today hosts since the program's inception:

Co-Anchor Pairings
Years	Anchor 1	Anchor 2	
1952–1961	Dave Garroway	-	-
1961–1962	John Chancellor	-	-
1962–1966	Hugh Downs	-	-
1966–1971	Hugh Downs	Barbara Walters	
1971–1974	Frank McGee	Barbara Walters	
1974–1976	Jim Hartz	Barbara Walters	
1976–1981	Tom Brokaw	Jane Pauley	
1982–1989	Bryant Gumbel	Jane Pauley	
1990–1991	Bryant Gumbel	Deborah Norville	
1991–1997	Bryant Gumbel	Katie Couric	
1997–2006	Matt Lauer	Katie Couric	
2006–2011	Matt Lauer	Meredith Vieira	
2011–2012	Matt Lauer	Ann Curry	
2012–2017	Matt Lauer	Savannah Guthrie	
2017–2025	Hoda Kotb	Savannah Guthrie	
2025–present	Craig Melvin	Savannah Guthrie	

Hugh Downs (right) interviewing Florida Governor Claude Kirk at the 1968 Republican National Convention

Host tenures
Host	First appearance	Last appearance	Length of tenure
Dave Garroway	January 14, 1952	June 16, 1961	9 years, 154 days
John Chancellor	July 17, 1961	September 7, 1962	1 year, 53 days
Hugh Downs	September 10, 1962	October 8, 1971	9 years, 29 days
Barbara Walters	September 16, 1966	June 4, 1976	9 years, 263 days
Frank McGee	October 11, 1971	April 17, 1974	2 years, 189 days
Jim Hartz	July 29, 1974	August 23, 1976	2 years, 26 days
Tom Brokaw	August 30, 1976	December 18, 1981	5 years, 111 days
Jane Pauley	October 11, 1976	December 29, 1989	13 years, 80 days
Bryant Gumbel	January 4, 1982	January 3, 1997	15 years, 0 days
Deborah Norville	January 8, 1990	February 22, 1991	1 year, 46 days
Katie Couric	February 25, 1991	May 31, 2006	15 years, 96 days
Matt Lauer	January 6, 1997	November 28, 2017	20 years, 327 days
Meredith Vieira	September 13, 2006	June 8, 2011	4 years, 269 days
Ann Curry	June 9, 2011	June 28, 2012	1 year, 20 days
Savannah Guthrie	July 9, 2012	ongoing	14 years, 136 days
Hoda Kotb	November 29, 2017	January 10, 2025	7 years, 43 days
Craig Melvin	January 13, 2025	ongoing	1 year, 313 days

Notes:

- Walters was hired as a Today writer and researcher in 1961, making her first appearance that August with a segment on that year's fall/winter Paris Fashion Week. She was appointed as a "Today Girl" and reporter in October 1964. She was de facto co-anchor from September 1966, but was not credited as a host for contractual reasons until Frank McGee's death in April 1974.
- Curry served as the show's "Anchor at Large" from 2012 to 2015, after her time as a primary host.
- Guthrie first joined Today as co-host of the third hour in May 2011.

==== News anchors ====
From the show's inception, the idea of providing the latest news headlines has been critical to the function of the program. In that vein, there has always been at least one person on set whose job it is to prepare and deliver newscasts. In 1952, that person was called the "news editor" or (informally) "news chief". In modern parlance, the term "newsreader" or "news anchor" is preferred. Under the two-hour format, four newscasts were delivered, once every half-hour. Presently, there are only two newscasts, delivered at the top of each of the first two hours. Some anchors, including Jim Fleming, Lew Wood, Floyd Kalber and John Palmer, were seasoned journalists before joining the program. Others, including Ann Curry, have used the position to increase their journalistic acumen, at times leaving the newsdesk behind to venture into the field. News anchors have included the following:

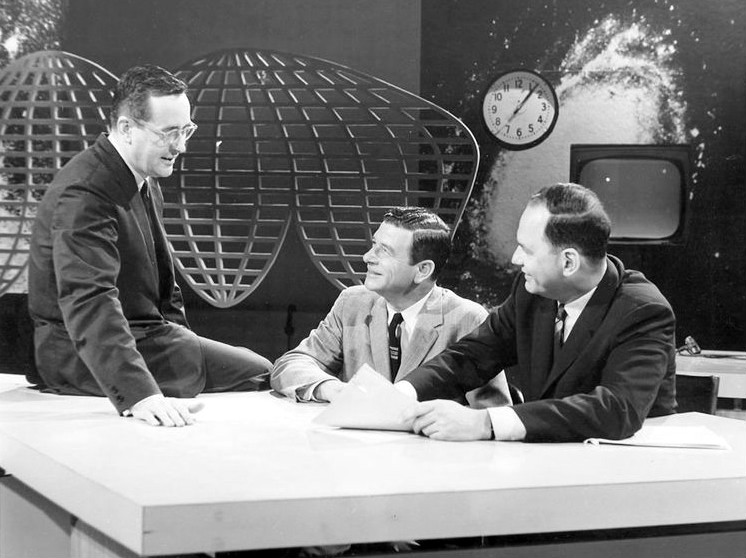
The program in 1961: John Chancellor, Frank Blair, and Edwin Newman

- Jim Fleming (1952–1953)
- Merrill Mueller (1953)
- Frank Blair (1953–1975)
- Lew Wood (1975–1976)
- Floyd Kalber (1976–1979)
- Tony Guida (1979)
- No separate news anchor (1979–1981, Tom Brokaw and Jane Pauley read headlines)
- Chris Wallace and Pauley (1982)
- John Palmer (1982–1989)
- Deborah Norville (1989)
- Faith Daniels (1990–1992)
- Margaret Larson (1992–1994)
- Matt Lauer (1994–1997)
- Ann Curry (1997–2011)
- Natalie Morales (2011–2016)
- No separate news anchor (2016–2018, co-anchors read headlines)
- Craig Melvin (2018–2025)
- No separate news anchor (2025-present, Savannah Guthrie and Craig Melvin read headlines)

==== Weather anchors ====
For the program's first 25 years, weather reports were delivered by the host or newsreader. Dave Garroway illustrated the day's forecast by drawing fronts and areas of precipitation on a big chalkboard map of the United States, based on information gathered earlier in the morning from the National Weather Service in Washington, D.C. Subsequent hosts John Chancellor and Hugh Downs dropped the chalkboard weather map concept, and instead read a prepared weather summary over a still image of a weather map. When the show converted to all-color broadcasts in 1965, weather maps were prepared and projected on a screen behind Frank Blair, who delivered the forecast immediately after his news summaries. Following Blair's retirement on March 14, 1975, Lew Wood took over the newsreader and weather reporting duties (using Blair's format). When Floyd Kalber became newsreader in 1976, Wood was relegated to weather, sports, roving reporter assignments, and presenting live on-air commercials until his departure in 1978.

The weather is reported every half-hour during the program's first two hours, though since Al Roker was named weather reporter on January 26, 1996, an interview is conducted by him in place of the national weather forecast at least once during the show, leaving only the local weather inserts by NBC stations.

Prior to Roker, Today weather reporters were Bob Ryan (1978–1980) and Willard Scott (1980–1996). Until Ryan's hiring, no one on the show had practical experience or academic credentials in meteorology. With NBC's purchase of The Weather Channel in 2008, personnel from that network frequently participate in Today forecast segments, at the site of a weather event or from the cable channel's suburban Atlanta headquarters, or as a fill-in for Roker. This lasted until 2018 when TWC was acquired by Entertainment Studios.

NBC owned-and-operated stations and network affiliates are given a 30-second window to insert a local forecast segment into the program following the national weather report; Roker's outcue for the local break is "That's what's going on around the country, here's what's happening in your neck of the woods," although in recent years, this outcue was used during only starting the second half-hour. During the first half hour, Roker simply uses "your local forecast" which appears after a 30-second commercial. Those not watching on an affiliate which provides local weather segments following the outcue (including international viewers, as well as NBC stations that do not have a news department) see a national summary of temperatures on a weather map.

The semi-retired Scott, who gained fame through his antics that included costumes and props, still appeared on-air to continue his tradition of wishing "happy birthday" to centenarians. Scott's traditional local cue was "Here's what's happening in your world, even as we speak." He retired completely from television on December 15, 2015.

==== Regular panelists ====
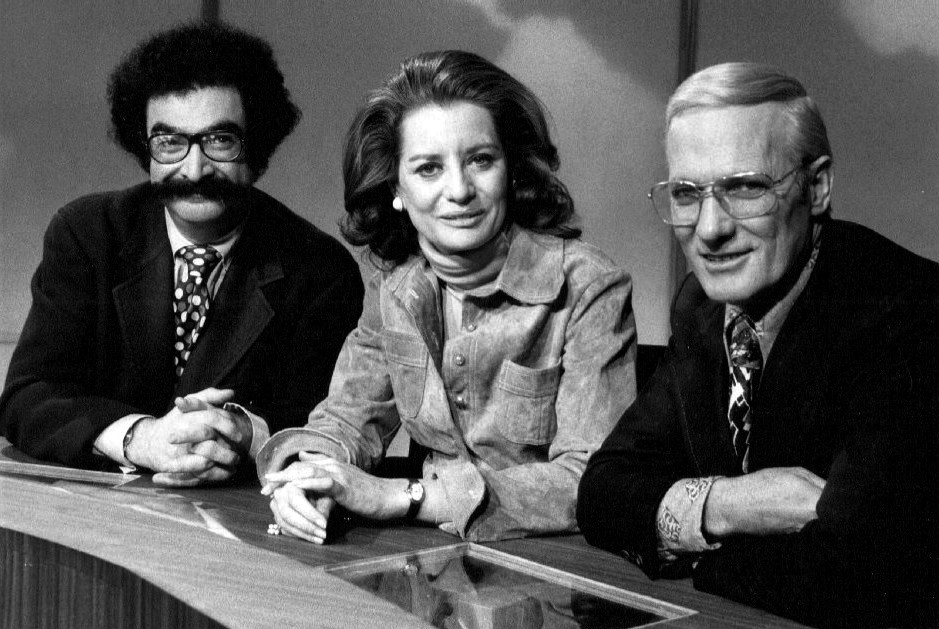
1973 show panel: Gene Shalit, Barbara Walters and Frank McGee

The job of "panelist" has no set definition. Panelist duties can range from conducting interviews to reporting on a number of topics in-studio and in the field. Regular panelists on the program include the following:

- Jack Lescoulie (1952–1967)
- Edwin Newman (1952–1984)
- Judith Crist (1964–1973)
- Barbara Walters (1966–1974, officially titled "co-host" in 1974)
- Joe Garagiola (1967–1973 and 1990–1992)
- Gene Shalit (1973–2010)

==== Today Girls ====
From 1952 to 1964, a notable member of the cast was a woman, often an entertainer, the Today Girl. Usually, she discussed fashion and lifestyle, reported the weather, covered lighter-fare stories or engaged in verbal jousting with Garroway. Estelle Parsons was the first to hold the job, though her title at the time was "Women's Editor". Upon her departure in 1955, the Today Girl name was adopted. The last to hold the position, Barbara Walters, discussed the job in her autobiography Audition: A Memoir. She wrote that the Today Girl era pre-dated feminism, as it was believed that nobody would take a woman seriously reporting "infotainment" - Walters described the position as a "tea pourer". In 1966, Walters was promoted to co-anchor alongside Hugh Downs, and the Today Girl position was eliminated. Those who held the position were:

- Estelle Parsons (official title: "Women's Editor", 1952–1955)
- Lee Meriwether (1955–1956)
- Helen O'Connell (1956–1958)
- Betsy Palmer (1958)
- Florence Henderson (1959–1960)
- Joyce Davidson (1960)
- Pat Fontaine (1962–1963)
- Maureen O'Sullivan (1964)

==== J. Fred Muggs ====
From 1953 to 1957, the program featured J. Fred Muggs, a chimpanzee whose antics entertained viewers, but frustrated the program's staff, especially Dave Garroway. Also occasionally appearing was J. Fred's "girlfriend" Phoebe B. Beebe.

== Transitions ==
=== Pauley to Norville ===
In 1989, Deborah Norville (then anchor of the network's early-morning news program at the time, NBC News at Sunrise) replaced John Palmer at the Today newsdesk, at which point he assumed her previous role on Sunrise. She also began substituting for Tom Brokaw on NBC Nightly News. Shortly after Norville's appointment as Today's news anchor, the decision was made to feature her as an unofficial third host. Whereas Palmer had read the news from a desk separate from where Gumbel and Pauley sat, Norville was seated alongside the program's hosts at the opening and closing of every show. Before long, gossip columns and media observers predicted that NBC would remove Jane Pauley from the program and replace her with Norville in an effort to improve the program's recently declining viewership among young women, the demographic most coveted by morning shows. During this period, Saturday Night Live featured a sketch titled "All About Deborah Norville" (a takeoff on the classic film All About Eve), which depicted Norville as ruthlessly scheming to take Pauley's place as Today co-host.

In October 1989, it was announced that 13-year veteran Pauley would leave Today at the end of the year. NBC, as expected, announced that Norville would become co-host. An emotional Norville hugged Pauley on the air after the announcement was made, and many at the network hoped the negative press generated by Norville's increased presence on the program would end. However, this turned out not to be the case. Prior to the announcement of Pauley's departure, much of the criticism had focused on Norville's youth and beauty, with many branding her "the other woman" and a "home wrecker", in a reference to what some felt seemed like her intent on "breaking up" the television marriage of Gumbel and Pauley.

The negative press only heightened after the announcement of Pauley's resignation, and Norville was put under a gag order by NBC brass, which prevented her from defending herself from the widespread and erroneous reports that she somehow orchestrated her rise on Today. In January 1990, the new anchor team of Bryant Gumbel and Deborah Norville, minus Jane Pauley, debuted with disastrous results. Nielsen ratings for the program began to plummet. Critics felt that Gumbel and Norville lacked chemistry and many loyal viewers began turning to rival ABC's Good Morning America (GMA).

=== Norville to Couric ===
By the end of 1990, Today, the longtime dominant program, was officially the second-place morning show behind GMA, and most of the blame was pinned on Norville. By the outbreak of the Gulf War in 1991, Norville saw her role as co-host continually minimized. Today aired special editions of the program called "America at War", with Gumbel anchoring most of the show alone. It was not uncommon for Norville not even to appear until the two-hour show's second half-hour. In addition, she was directed not to initiate conversation on the show and only speak when asked a question by Gumbel. Norville left the show for parental leave in February 1991. It was announced that Katie Couric would substitute co-host during Norville's absence. Ratings for the program rose immediately following Norville's departure and Couric's arrival.

Midway through her maternity leave, Norville was interviewed by People. In the story, she avoided conversation about her recent trouble on Today and instead focused on her newborn baby boy. She was photographed breastfeeding her son, a seemingly innocuous event, but NBC management was said to be greatly displeased by this, believing the photo to be "in poor taste". By April 1991, in light of improved ratings on Today and NBC's displeasure at the People photograph, it was announced that Norville would not return to Today and that Katie Couric had been named the program's co-host. Norville, it was disclosed, would continue to be paid in accordance with her contract, although she would no longer appear on any NBC News programs.

=== Gumbel to Lauer ===
On January 4, 1996, Bryant Gumbel announced that he would depart Today. Later that year in December, NBC announced that news anchor Matt Lauer would succeed Gumbel as co-anchor of Today. Gumbel departed the Today show on January 3, 1997. Guests on Gumbel's final show included appearances by then-First Lady Hillary Clinton, Gumbel's former Today co-anchor Jane Pauley, Maya Angelou, Muhammad Ali and Prince (Note: Prince at the time was known as "the Artist Formerly Known as Prince".) who was dressed up in a similar fashion to Gumbel and performed "Take Me with U" and "Raspberry Beret". Lauer took over from Gumbel as co-host on January 6. Later in 1997, Gumbel joined CBS News as host of a prime-time newsmagazine called Public Eye with Bryant Gumbel during the 1997-1998 television season. He would also compete with Today as co-anchor of The Early Show from 1999 to 2002.

=== Couric to Vieira ===
On April 5, 2006, Katie Couric announced on her 15th anniversary as co-host of Today that she would leave the program and NBC News at the end of May to become the new anchor and managing editor of the CBS Evening News. Couric's final broadcast, on May 31, 2006, was dedicated to her 15 years as one of the show's co-hosts and celebrated her move to the anchor chair at CBS, where she also became a correspondent for the network's Sunday night newsmagazine program 60 Minutes. Couric said during the show, "It's been a pleasure hosting this program, and thank you for fifteen great years." A special video presentation was broadcast, recapping her best moments and news stories on Today during her 15 years with the show.

The day after Couric's announcement, Meredith Vieira, then a host of ABC's The View announced on that show that she would take over as Lauer's co-anchor in September. Lauer and Vieira began co-hosting together on September 13, 2006.

On June 1, 2006 (the day after Couric's departure), NBC News announced that for the summer of 2006, Today would move to a temporary outdoor studio as Studio 1A was going through renovations to prepare for its switch to high-definition. On that same day, NBC News launched a new advertisement promoting Vieira's arrival. That summer, Couric's anchor seat was filled by various hosts, consisting of Curry, Morales and Campbell Brown (all of whom were considered candidates to replace Couric), until Vieira took over that fall.

In March 2010, Vieira signed a contract to keep her with the program until at least September 2011. However, she announced on May 9, 2011, that she would depart as co-host in the following month, but would remain at NBC News as a special correspondent.

=== Vieira to Curry ===
After announcing her resignation, Meredith Vieira departed the program on June 8, 2011. Vieira's spot was filled by the program's longtime news anchor Ann Curry, appearing alongside Matt Lauer as co-host. Correspondent Natalie Morales replaced Curry as news anchor in turn, with Al Roker remaining as the weather anchor. Savannah Guthrie joined Morales and Roker as co-host of the third (9:00 a.m.) hour.

Almost a year after her departure, Vieira returned briefly to Today as a special correspondent for events relating to Elizabeth II's Diamond Jubilee Celebration. On June 5, 2012, she co-presented the show with Lauer from London.

=== Curry to Guthrie ===
NBC revealed on June 28, 2012, that Ann Curry would no longer co-host Today, and would continue to work for NBC News (where she remained until her departure in January 2015), including continuing to appear on Today. Curry's title was changed to "Today Anchor at Large and NBC News National & International Correspondent," with responsibilities including leading a seven-person unit producing content for NBC Nightly News, Dateline NBC, Rock Center with Brian Williams and Today, with occasional anchor duties for Nightly News. Curry also reported for NBC's coverage of the 2012 Summer Olympics in London. On July 9, 2012, Savannah Guthrie succeeded Curry as co-anchor alongside Lauer, Roker and Morales.

Ann Curry's final show as co-anchor was subdued compared to the earlier departures of Katie Couric and Meredith Vieira, as it did not include retrospectives of Curry's 15-year run on the program or goodbye messages from colleagues and celebrities, although Curry – seated alongside Lauer, Natalie Morales and Al Roker in the couch area of the Studio 1A set – gave a tear-filled farewell message to viewers. Rumors of Curry's departure from Today began weeks before NBC formally announced that she would no longer be co-host, spurring negative press similar to that resulting from the departure of Jane Pauley and her replacement by Deborah Norville 23 years earlier, as early reports suggested that Matt Lauer had a hand in the program's decision to let Curry go. Viewership declines for the program that began in the months following Curry becoming co-host precipitated in part due to public criticism over Lauer's alleged involvement in Curry's departure; loyal viewers once again began turning to the competing Good Morning America, which toppled Today's 16-year consecutive run as the top-rated morning news program during the week of April 9, 2012. The public relations problems for Lauer that resulted from the accusations, led then-executive producer Jim Bell to admit responsibility for the negative press, in defense of Lauer, in a series of interviews with The New York Times, The Hollywood Reporter and the Associated Press.

=== Lauer to Kotb ===
On November 29, 2017, Hoda Kotb became the interim co-anchor after Matt Lauer was terminated. Prior to that, from April 17, 2017, she had been a third anchor of Today, sitting alongside Lauer and Guthrie at the beginning of the second half-hour. On January 2, 2018, her interim status became permanent, making her and Savannah Guthrie the first all-female anchor duo in Today's history and the second all-female anchor duo overall.

NBC News Chairman Andrew Lack said in an email that Kotb has "seamlessly stepped" into the position, and with Guthrie, "quickly hit the ground running". "They have an undeniable connection with each other and most importantly, with viewers, a hallmark of Today," Lack added.

Just before the holidays, NBC executives offered the job to Kotb. She also continued to co-host the fourth hour of the show, a role she had held since 2007.

=== Kotb to Melvin ===
On September 26, 2024, Kotb announced her decision to step down as co-anchor of Today and co-host of the fourth hour in early 2025, but would remain at NBC in a role that was unspecified. Kotb had been co-hosting the fourth hour since 2007. In her announcement on the show, Kotb said she made her decision after turning 60 and stated, "I realized that it was time for me to turn the page at 60 and to try something new." On November 14, 2024, Kotb's final day was announced for January 10, 2025, with Today news anchor and 3rd Hour Today co-host Craig Melvin succeeding Kotb as co-anchor of Today beginning January 13, 2025.

In February 2026, following the disappearance of Guthrie's mother Nancy, Guthrie pulled out of traveling to the 2026 Winter Olympics to host NBC's coverage of the opening ceremony. Melvin later withdrew from Olympic coverage, resulting in Today completely pulling out of on-site Olympic broadcasts. As a result of Guthrie's absence, Kotb returned as an ongoing fill-in for Guthrie, alongside Melvin. Guthrie returned to Today on April 6, 2026, with NBC reportedly putting strict procedures in place for handling any news on her mother that would potentially break during the program.

== Controversies ==
=== Gumbel's memo ===
In 1989, Bryant Gumbel wrote a memo to the program's then-executive producer Marty Ryan, which was critical of other Today personalities, and was leaked to the press. In the memo, Gumbel commented that Willard Scott "holds the show hostage to his assortment of whims, wishes, birthdays and bad taste... This guy is killing us and no one's even trying to rein him in." He commented that Gene Shalit's movie reviews "are often late and his interviews aren't very good".

There was enough negative backlash in regard to Gumbel's comments toward Scott that Gumbel was shown reconciling with Scott on Today.

=== Selective editing of George Zimmerman 9-1-1 call ===
After the killing of Trayvon Martin, Today ran a selectively edited version of the 9-1-1 call that George Zimmerman made prior to shooting and killing Martin (which he defended as being committed in self-defense while standing trial for the shooting, for which he was acquitted on charges of murder in July 2013), which had the effect of making Zimmerman appear racist. In a March 2012 edition of the program, Today played a recording of Zimmerman saying, "This guy looks like he's up to no good. He looks black." However, several seconds of the call were cut from the 911 tape, removing Zimmerman's description of Martin, and a question asked to him about the teenager by the 911 operator. In the original, unedited tape, Zimmerman said, "This guy looks like he's up to no good. Or he's on drugs or something. It's raining and he's just walking around, looking about." The operator then asked, "OK, and this guy – is he black, white or Hispanic?", to which Zimmerman answered, "He looks black."

In an opinion piece, Erik Wemple of The Washington Post wrote that Today's alteration "would more readily paint Zimmerman as a racial profiler. In reality's version, Zimmerman simply answered a question about the race of the person whom he was reporting to the police. Nothing prejudicial at all in responding to such an inquiry... it's a falsehood with repercussions. Much of the public discussion over the past week has settled on how conflicting facts and interpretations call into question whether Zimmerman acted justifiably or criminally... To portray that exchange in a way that wrongs Zimmerman is high editorial malpractice..."

Following an internal investigation into the production of the segment, NBC News fired two employees who were involved in the piece, including a producer based at the division's Miami bureau, in April 2012. In December 2012, George Zimmerman filed a defamation lawsuit against NBC for the editing of the 911 call. Florida Circuit Court Judge Debra Nelson dismissed the suit on June 30, 2014, citing that there were "no genuine issues of material fact upon which a reasonable jury could find that the Defendants [NBCUniversal] acted with actual malice," but although Zimmerman could not prove that he was the victim of "actual malice", stated that the malice standard was appropriate since Zimmerman is a public figure.

=== 9/11 Moment of Silence omission ===
On September 11, 2012, Today sparked outrage after the program neglected to interrupt an interview with Keeping Up with the Kardashians co-star Kris Jenner to broadcast the 11th anniversary remembrance ceremonies of the September 11 attacks at 8:46 a.m. Eastern. NBC was the only national television news outlet in the United States that did not interrupt regular programming to broadcast the moment of silence live. While the coverage of the ceremonies was not seen on the NBC network feed in most of the country, the network's New York City flagship owned-and-operated station WNBC interrupted the Today broadcast to run locally produced special coverage of the entire ceremony.

=== Matt Lauer termination ===
On November 29, 2017, NBC terminated Lauer following allegations of "inappropriate sexual behavior". NBC News chairman Andrew Lack announced Lauer's termination, stating: "It represented, after serious review, a clear violation of our company's standards. As a result, we've decided to terminate his employment. While it is the first complaint about his behavior in the over twenty years he's been at NBC News, we were also presented with reason to believe this may not have been an isolated incident. Our highest priority is to create a workplace environment where everyone feels safe and protected, and to ensure that any actions that run counter to our core values are met with consequences, no matter who the offender." Lauer would eventually be replaced by the long-time anchor of the show's fourth hour, Hoda Kotb.

Although NBC did not publicly report or comment on the specifics of the allegations, the entertainment industry publication Variety ran a two-month long investigation involving interviews with Lauer's former NBC colleagues on his behavior towards them, which included lurid accusations of making verbal and typed lewd comments, as well as making suggestive references to a colleague's sexual performance. It was later learned that the firing occurred after Lauer's one-time co-host Meredith Vieira urged her assistant, who was among the complainants, to report the matter to NBC.

=== Megyn Kelly blackface controversy ===
During the episode of October 23, 2018, Megyn Kelly participated in a panel discussion on the appropriateness of blackface in Halloween costume on her morning show Megyn Kelly Today. During the segment, Kelly recollected that "when I was a kid, that was okay as long as you were dressing up as like a character", and added that "[Luann de Lesseps] wants to look like Diana Ross for one day, and I don't know how that got racist on Halloween." Her comments were widely criticized for being interpreted as a defense of the practice, which is generally considered to be a derogatory caricature of African-Americans. Critics likened Kelly's remarks to a previous incident during her tenure at Fox News Channel, where Kelly asserted that Jesus and Santa Claus were white.

Later that day, Kelly issued an internal email apologizing for the remarks, stating that "I realize now that such behavior is indeed wrong, and I am sorry", and that "I've never been a 'pc' kind of person — but I understand that we do need to be more sensitive in this day and age. Particularly on race and ethnicity issues which, far from being healed, have been exacerbated in our politics over the past year. This is a time for more understanding, love, sensitivity and honor, and I want to be part of that. I look forward to continuing that discussion."

Kelly opened the October 24 episode with a public apology, as well as a follow-up discussion with African-American commentators Amy Holmes and Roland Martin on why blackface is considered controversial. The same day, The Hollywood Reporter reported that Kelly had left the Creative Artists Agency, and had hired an attorney. It was also reported that, prior to the incident, Kelly and NBC had been discussing canceling the program so she could focus more on serving as a correspondent, but that the comments may have an impact on her future at the network. The week's remaining episodes were replaced by encores.

On October 26, 2018, NBC News confirmed the cancellation of Megyn Kelly Today and announced that the show's existing anchors would temporarily fill the third hour. This would prove to be permanent and the team has remained the same since then.

== Expansion ==
=== Current ===
==== Weekend Today ====
Today first expanded to weekends on September 20, 1987, with the debut of the Sunday edition. Five years later on August 1, 1992, the Saturday edition made its debut, expanding the program to seven days a week. The Sunday broadcast was originally 90 minutes in length, until the third half-hour being dropped with the expansion of Meet the Press to an hour-long broadcast in 1992; it now airs for one hour, while the Saturday broadcast airs for 90 minutes.

The weekend broadcasts continue the Today format of covering breaking news, interviews with newsmakers, reports on a variety of popular-culture and human-interest stories, covering health and finance issues, and national weather reports. NBC feeds the Saturday edition from 7:00 a.m. to 8:30 a.m. (although it is often shortened by a half hour to air the network's "The More You Know" block in full when there is an early start to sports) and the Sunday edition from 8:00 a.m. to 9:00 a.m. (both in the Eastern Time Zone), although many of the network's affiliates air local newscasts in those time slots and carry the network broadcast earlier or later in the morning; many NBC affiliates also bookend the Sunday edition with local morning newscasts that immediately precede and follow the program. NBC's New York City, Chicago, San Francisco and Los Angeles owned-and-operated stations air the Sunday edition simultaneously (but not live) at 9:00 a.m Eastern, 8:00 a.m. Central and 6:00 a.m. Pacific Time.

NBC premiered Saturday Today Extra sometime in fall 2025, which usually follows the 90-minute Saturday Today broadcast on select weeks.

Weekend editions are tailored to the priorities and interests of weekend viewers – offering special series such as "Saturday Today on the Plaza", featuring live performances by major music acts and Broadway theatrical productions outside the studio throughout the summer.

During NBC Olympic broadcasts, the weekday anchors and staff present the majority of the program on both Saturday and Sunday throughout the two weeks to maintain promotional momentum, with limited contributions from the weekend team from New York. During some Olympic broadcasts, weekend editions are preempted altogether to show live sports.

==== Early Today ====
The first brand extension of Today was created in 1982. The early morning news program Early Today was conceived as a lead-in for Today, featuring the same anchors as the main program at the time, Bryant Gumbel and Jane Pauley. The half-hour program was fed twice to allow affiliates to carry one or both broadcasts. NBC canceled the program after a year, and replaced it with NBC News at Sunrise, originally anchored by Connie Chung.

In April 1999, NBC canceled Sunrise for two brand extensions of Today. One was Early Today which was revived September 7, 1999; the revived program originally was produced by CNBC and focused on business and financial news before switching to general news under the same production staff as MSNBC First Look in 2004. Early Today continues to air on the network, airing live each weekday morning at 3:00 a.m. Eastern Time (with an updated telecast for viewers in the Pacific Time Zone), and on tape delay until 10:00 a.m. Eastern – corresponding with the start time of Today in the Pacific Time Zone – to allow for adjustment in airtimes for other time zones and for certain NBC stations without a local morning newscast to air Early Today in lieu of one.

==== Today 3rd Hour ====
Today
- Also known as: 3rd Hour Today; The 3rd
- Genre: Talk show; News program
- Presented by: Craig Melvin; Al Roker; Dylan Dreyer

Production
- Production location: NBC Studios
- Camera setup: Multi-camera
- Running time: 44–52 minutes

Original release
- Release: October 29, 2018 – present

Related
- Megyn Kelly Today

Today 3rd Hour (often shortened to The 3rd), the current name for the third hour of Today, features anchors who appear in the first two hours of the program. After Megyn Kelly Today was canceled on October 26, 2018, NBC announced that Today anchors would host the third hour. The new third hour premiered on October 29, 2018, with Hoda Kotb, Craig Melvin and Al Roker anchoring for the first 20 minutes from Studio 1A, reporting on the Pittsburgh synagogue shooting, with Savannah Guthrie anchoring live from Pittsburgh. At the top of the program, Kotb said:

Today, as you know, we are starting a new chapter in the third hour of our show as it evolves. We want you to know that the entire Today family will continue to bring you informative and important stories, just as we always have.

After 20 minutes, the program continued with Jenna Bush Hager from Studio 6A, the former home of Megyn Kelly Today, where broadcasts of the third hour would begin to be based. Since its debut, the third hour has used a modified nameless opening title sequence compared to the other editions of Today. Various other Today and NBC News personalities filled in until January, when it was announced that the official hosts would be Al Roker, Sheinelle Jones, Dylan Dreyer and Craig Melvin, with the show becoming a primarily panel discussion program under the banner of The 3rd Hour. On December 4, 2018, an NBC News spokesperson confirmed that The 3rd would move to Studio 1A to streamline the production process and create a more seamless broadcast. The last day at Studio 6A was January 4, 2019, with new broadcasts in Studio 1A beginning on January 7.

On December 9, 2025, Today announced Jones would be leaving the 9 a.m. hour to become a permanent co-host of the 10 a.m. hour alongside Jenna Bush Hager, beginning January 12, 2026. Jones departed Today 3rd Hour on January 2, 2026.

On July 13, 2026, the third hour was nominated for a Daytime Emmy Award for Outstanding Daytime Talk Series.

==== Today with Jenna & Sheinelle ====
Today with Jenna & Sheinelle premiered on January 12, 2026, as the fourth hour of Today, succeeding Jenna & Friends. The program is hosted by Jenna Bush Hager and Sheinelle Jones, and continues to be a distinct entity from the earlier hours of Today. Following Jones' return to Today in September 2025, Jones had been seen as a leading candidate for the 10 a.m. hour. NBC executives are expecting Hager and Jones to grow into a duo similar to Gifford/Kotb during the Kathie Lee and Hoda era.

==== Today All Day ====
Today All Day
- Type: Free ad-supported streaming television
- Country: United States
- Broadcast area: Nationwide

Programming
- Language: English

Ownership
- Parent: NBC News
- Sister channels: NBC News Now

History
- Launched: July 15, 2020; 6 years ago

Links
- Webcast: today.com/allday

On July 15, 2020, NBC launched Today All Day, a free ad-supported streaming television (FAST) channel featuring blocks of soft news and lifestyle segments from Today, as well as original content hosted by the program's personalities. The channel launched on Peacock and the Today website, with plans to also offer it via other FAST providers.

=== Former ===
==== Later Today ====
On September 7, 1999, NBC launched Later Today, a talk show that was intended to air immediately following the then two-hour Today. Replacing Leeza (which would continue in first-run syndication for one more year) on the network's morning schedule, Later Today was hosted by Jodi Applegate, Florence Henderson and Asha Blake. The program was canceled on August 11, 2000, due to lackluster ratings; it was replaced two months later by the third hour of Today, later known as Today's Take.

==== Today's Take ====
Today's Take
- Also known as: The Take
- Genre: Talk show
- Presented by: Al Roker; Ann Curry; Natalie Morales; Willie Geist; Tamron Hall; Ellie Kemper; Billy Bush; Dylan Dreyer; Sheinelle Jones

Production
- Production locations: Rockefeller Plaza, Manhattan, New York City
- Camera setup: Multi-camera
- Running time: 44–52 minutes

Original release
- Release: October 2, 2000 – September 22, 2017

Related
- Megyn Kelly Today

Today's Take (sometimes called The Take) was the third-hour segment of Today. This "show-within-a-show" had its own anchors (although featuring on-air staff that appears during the first two hours of the program), opening title sequence and theme music.

On October 2, 2000, NBC expanded Today to three hours, with the addition of an hour from 9:00 a.m. to 10:00 a.m. For its first twelve years, the format of the third hour was originally structured similarly to Today's first two hours, using the same anchors as that portion of the broadcast; separate anchors began to be used for the third hour over time, with only the news anchor (Ann Curry until 2011, then Natalie Morales) and the weather anchor (Al Roker) being shared with the main 7:00 a.m. – 9:00 a.m. block – this was particularly the case during instances where Matt Lauer or his co-host (Katie Couric, then Meredith Vieira from 2006 to 2011, Ann Curry from 2011 to 2012, and finally Savannah Guthrie during the final months of the original format) could not be present for the entire hour due to reporting assignments or personal commitments. Vieira, outside of breaking news situations, was specifically disallowed by contract from any duties in the third hour due to her hosting commitments to the syndicated version of Who Wants to Be a Millionaire by Disney–ABC Domestic Television.

The network revamped the format of the third hour on November 12, 2012, and gave it the in-program title Today's Take. Roker was joined during the revamped third hour by Natalie Morales and Willie Geist (who had recently joined Today after ending his run as the original anchor of MSNBC's Way Too Early); MSNBC anchor and Today correspondent Tamron Hall was added as a co-host for that hour of the program on February 24, 2014, and Ellie Kemper joined the program on June 29, 2015, as a temporary co-host (until July 17, 2015).

With the change, traditional news segments at the beginning of the hour were abandoned in favor of a topical "host chat" format similar to the opening segment of the succeeding fourth hour of the program (with the only difference being that top general news events are discussed somewhat more often, in addition to featuring topical discussions on offbeat and pop culture-related stories and periodic clips from television programs aired the previous night and viral video). Instead, the news segment (titled News with Natalie, anchored by Morales, and alternately titled Today's News on days when Morales was off) was featured prior to the local update cutaways near the end of the first half-hour; national weather segments are also retained following the host chat segments in both half-hours. Beginning in May 2015, the News with Natalie/Today's News segment moved to 9:30 a.m. and the national weather segment to follow and the host chat at 9:30 a.m. was discontinued.

On August 22, 2016, both Morales and Geist left Today's Take and former Access Hollywood host Billy Bush officially joined the set. Bush was later suspended and eventually fired from the segment as well as the program following the Donald Trump Access Hollywood tape controversy during Donald Trump's 2016 presidential campaign.

On February 1, 2017, Hall left Today's Take. Weekend co-anchor Sheinelle Jones and weekend meteorologist Dylan Dreyer filled in as co-hosts alongside Roker until a new morning lineup began in the fall.

Today's Take aired its final episode on September 22, 2017, and Megyn Kelly Today replaced it on September 25, 2017.

==== Megyn Kelly Today ====
Megyn Kelly Today premiered on September 25, 2017, as a replacement for Today's Take. It was hosted by former Fox News anchor Megyn Kelly, and was structured as a daytime talk show.

In the wake of stable but lower viewership in comparison to the timeslot's predecessor, a desire by Kelly to focus more on her overall role at NBC News, and in the wake of controversy over a recent segment discussing blackface, the show was officially cancelled on October 26, 2018. Kelly never again appeared on NBC and departed the network three months later.

==== Today with Kathie Lee and Hoda ====
Today with Kathie Lee and Hoda was the fourth-hour segment of Today hosted by Kathie Lee Gifford and Hoda Kotb, which aired from April 7, 2008, to April 5, 2019. It replaced the original fourth hour that debuted earlier that fall on September 10, 2007, originally hosted by Ann Curry, Natalie Morales, and Hoda Kotb. The program was its own distinct entity, with its own website and social media presence. The fourth hour does not have news or weather segments or input from the earlier hosts and is structured virtually as a standalone talk show, with an opening "host chat" segment reminiscent of the one popularized by Gifford and Regis Philbin on Live! with Regis and Kathie Lee, as well as interviews and features focusing on entertainment, fashion and other topics aimed at female viewers.

On December 11, 2018, NBC and Gifford announced that she would be retiring from her position of anchoring the fourth hour in April 2019, her 11th anniversary since joining Today. Kotb continues co-anchoring the fourth hour. On February 26, 2019, NBC announced that Jenna Bush Hager, the daughter of former U.S. President George W. Bush would replace Gifford.

==== Today with Hoda & Jenna ====
Today with Hoda & Jenna premiered on April 8, 2019, as the fourth hour of Today, succeeding Kathie Lee & Hoda. The program was hosted by Hoda Kotb and Jenna Bush Hager. Kotb hosted the program until her departure on January 10, 2025.

==== Today with Jenna & Friends ====
Today with Jenna & Friends premiered on January 13, 2025, as the fourth hour of Today, succeeding Hoda & Jenna, hosted by Jenna Bush Hager. While continuing to follow a similar format as its predecessor as its own distinct entity, the program did not have a permanent co-host, but instead featured a different guest co-host each day. There were about 60 guest co-hosts which the program called "contenders" for Hager, including actress Scarlett Johansson, and comedian Matt Rogers. Former First Lady of the United States Michelle Obama joined as a special guest on November 4, 2025.

== Music ==
Today host Dave Garroway selected Les Brown's "Sentimental Journey" as the program's original theme music, which was used during Garroway's entire run from 1952 to 1961. In 1962, when Hugh Downs became host, Django Reinhardt's "Melodie au Crepuscule" was chosen as the new theme; it was replaced in 1963 by "Misty", an instrumental ballad composed by Erroll Garner and performed by Bobby Hackett and John B. Seng.

"Misty" served as Today's theme until 1971, when NBC News correspondent Frank McGee joined the show. Composer Ray Ellis penned an instrumental theme entitled "This is Today", a jazzy, up-tempo piece that served as the program's main theme until 1978. Because This is Today closely resembled Stephen Schwartz's song "Day by Day" from the musical Godspell, Schwartz successfully sued for copyright infringement. "This is Today" was revised as a result, with the second version of the piece incorporating the familiar NBC chimes was used until 1981, at the close of the Tom Brokaw–Jane Pauley era. The chimes were also used throughout the program to introduce and conclude segments, usually in combination with the familiar Today sunburst logo.

By the time Bryant Gumbel was appointed co-anchor of the program in 1982, a new version of Ellis' "This is Today" theme was introduced, using a looser, more relaxed arrangement that continued to feature the NBC chimes in its melody. A shorter arrangement of "This is Today" was used for the show open (featuring a rotating globe and the Today sunburst) from 1983 to 1985. The main theme was used until 1985, and due to its popularity with viewers was resurrected as the show's secondary theme in January 1993. The 1982 theme later served as the program's official "anniversary" music, used to open and close retrospective segments in the leadup to Today's 60th anniversary in 2012.

1985 saw the end of the synthesizer era at NBC as composer John Williams wrote a series of themes for all NBC News programs, with a cut entitled "The Mission", serving as the principal theme for NBC Nightly News with Tom Brokaw. Williams also composed two themes for Today: an opening fanfare for the program that was derived from the opening of "The Mission", and a two-minute closing theme for the show entitled "Scherzo for Today", a dramatic arrangement that made heavy use of strings and flutes. In the late 1980s, "Scherzo" was played in its entirety multiple times daily during the weather scrolls that ran during local commercial breaks; however, most NBC affiliates preempted these segments with locally slotted advertising. The new Today themes – used in tandem with the show's new opening sequence featuring the Statue of Liberty and a new living room studio set – gave the program a distinctly modern look and sound beginning in September 1985. A series of Williams-penned bumpers featuring "The Mission" signature were also used to open and close segments. "Scherzo for Today" was used as the program's closing theme until 1990, and "The Mission" bumpers were used until 1993 (one of them could be heard as a station break lead-in on NBC's Meet the Press until 2004).

Meanwhile, Williams' opening fanfare had opened the program ever since its 1985 introduction, with two brief interruptions; new opening themes were briefly introduced and quickly discarded in the summer of 1994 (to mark the debut of Studio 1A) and in 2004. The fanfare was iconically accompanied by Fred Facey announcing "From NBC News, this is Today... with (anchor) and (anchor)" (with "Live from Studio 1A in Rockefeller Plaza" being added to the introduction on June 20, 1994, when the show moved to its new studio). Although Facey died in April 2003, his introduction of the Couric–Lauer team was used for the duration of Couric's era (except for special editions requiring special introductions). Weekend Today announcer Les Marshak became the new voice of the weekday program on September 13, 2006. A lighter theme employing the NBC chimes was used to open the show's 7:30 a.m. through 9:30 a.m. half-hour segments, and was also used as a closing theme.

In March 2013, "The Mission" was replaced with a theme composed by Adam Gubman for Non-Stop Music. Along with Non-Stop Music, Gubman's rebranding could be heard dating back to Today's coverage of the wedding of Prince William and Catherine Middleton in April 2011. Gubman went on to write music for the network's 2012 election coverage, and continues to provide audio content for Today.

== Notable people ==
- Robert Bendick (1917–2008), Today Show producer, 1953–1955, and 1958–1960.

== Ratings ==
From 1995 to 2012, Today generally beat ABC rival Good Morning America in the Nielsen ratings among all network morning programs. By the week of September 11, 2006, the program earned 6.320 million total viewers, 1.6 million more than the 4.73 million viewers earned by Good Morning America. This gap eventually decreased, as by the week of June 30, 2008, Today was watched by an average of 4.9 million viewers, compared to Good Morning America's 3.8 million.

Furthermore, by the week of October 12, 2008, Today's total viewership had gone up to 4.910 million viewers, compared to second place Good Morning America's total viewership of 4.25 million (and significantly above the 2.66 million viewers earned by CBS' The Early Show). For the week above, the third hour (referred as "Today II" by NBC exclusively for Nielsen ratings counts) drew 2.9 million viewers and the fourth hour (referred in Nielsen ratings as "Today III"), delivered 1.7 million.

For the week of January 4, 2009, the 8:00 a.m. hour of Today averaged 5.998 million viewers; the 9:00 a.m. hour, meanwhile, averaged 4.447 million total viewers and a 1.4 rating among adults aged 25–54, marking that hour's best ratings since the week of August 11, 2008. The 10:00 a.m. hour averaged 2.412 million total viewers and a .8 rating in the demographic, the highest total viewership for that portion of the program since the week of December 31, 2007.

For the week of April 11, 2011, the program passed its 800th consecutive week as the No. 1 rated network morning news program, with 5.662 million total viewers (ahead of Good Morning America by approximately 1.2 million viewers).

During the week of April 25, 2011, Today averaged 6.424 million viewers, marking its best weekly total viewership since August 11, 2008, during the 2008 Summer Olympics. This was largely buoyed by the April 29 coverage of the wedding of Prince William and Catherine Middleton, which earned 9.628 million viewers (beating Good Morning America's coverage by more than 1.6 million viewers), and was also the best single day rating since November 8, 2000, the day after the 2000 presidential election.

== International broadcasts ==
- In West Asia and North Africa NBC News programs, including the live broadcast of Today, are shown daily on the 24-hour news network OSN News.
- In Australia, NBC Today (the title used in that country to avoid confusion with the local Nine Network program Today) airs an edited 42-minute version of the first two hours from 4:00 a.m. Tuesday to Saturday on the Seven Network (rerun at 9:00 a.m. on sister network 7two). The Today's Take hour (which is abbreviated to the same runtime) only airs Saturdays on the primary channel and Tuesday to Saturday on 7two; while Seven broadcasts the Sunday edition at 5:00 a.m. on Mondays, following Meet The Press. The program was originally trimmed to 63 minutes, with the local news cutaway removed. However, a news ticker appears at the bottom of the screen, containing national headlines, as well as information on the next edition of Seven's morning program Sunrise. A national weather map of Australia is inserted during local affiliate cutaways during the weather segment. Today does not air on the primary regional affiliates Prime7 and GWN7, which instead air infomercials. The show has aired on Seven since the mid-1980s, when clips from the show often aired as part of Seven's News Overnight program.
- In the Philippines, Today returned to cable TV on November 2, 2020. The show now airs live with repeats on TAP TV. Today previously aired on 9TV (formerly known as Talk TV and Solar News Channel) from 2011 to August 2014; an edited 90-minute version of the weekday editions aired Tuesdays through Saturdays at 5:30 a.m., with a two-hour abbreviated broadcast of the Friday editions airing at 10:00 a.m. local time on Saturdays. Weekend Today airs Saturdays for two hours at 10:00 p.m. and Sundays at 11:00 p.m. local time. The local affiliate cutaways during the weather segment were removed only from the weekday editions. Today with Kathie Lee and Hoda (titled Today's Talk for the TalkTV/SNC/9TV broadcasts) aired Tuesdays to Saturdays at 3:00 a.m. Both shows were removed from the schedule since then, particularly with the relaunch of 9TV as CNN Philippines.
- In the United Kingdom and several other countries, Today aired on Sky News from 1989 to 1993.
- In Europe, The Today Show together with other NBC productions such as The Tonight Show, Late Night with Conan O'Brien and Dateline NBC was aired for several years on the NBC-owned NBC Super Channel, later turned into NBC Europe. Initially Today aired live in the afternoon, from 1993 until 1995, when then NBC Europe began airing it on a one-day delay the morning after the original U.S. broadcast.
- In Asia, The Today Show was shown live during prime time on NBC Asia. This Pan-Asian network was owned by NBC and showed NBC productions such as The Tonight Show, Late Night with Conan O'Brien and Dateline NBC from 1994 until 1998, when the network was turned into National Geographic Channel.
- In Indonesia, NBC Today is aired on NBC-US at 5:00 p.m. to 7:00 p.m. WIB (6:00 p.m. to 8:00 p.m. WIB from March to November) with WNBC local weather exclusively for SVICLOUD TV Box. Aimed for U.S. expatriates in Indonesia.

== Accolades ==
- 2022: Institutional Peabody Award.

== See also ==
- List of special editions of Today (American TV program), for editions of the program marking major news events or breaking news coverage
