= Fred Facey =

American television personality (1930–2003)

Ferdinand A. Facey (October 19, 1930 – April 13, 2003), known as Fred Facey, was an American radio and television announcer.

== Career ==
Facey joined the announcing staff of NBC in New York City in 1967, and remained with the network for the rest of his life. In time, he would join the likes of Don Pardo and Howard Reig in holding lifetime contracts with the network. Prior to joining NBC, he had been a freelance announcer in Washington, D.C., the Long Island area and New York City.

In his early years with NBC, Facey mainly did radio work, mostly with its New York flagship station WNBC (AM), and was heard occasionally on live remotes that were heard on the network's annual New Year's Eve radio broadcasts.

By the mid-1970s or so, Facey began working on the television side, first as a booth announcer on promotional spots and bumpers. Starting in 1979, he introduced WNBC-TV's nightly NewsCenter4. He would remain the announcer for the station's newscasts for much of its 1980-1995 run as News 4 New York. In addition, he announced for Live at Five for its first two years on the air, before Don Pardo took over the duties for that show.

It was also in that period that Facey and Howard Reig became the main voices of NBC News, following the retirement of another longtime staff announcer, Bill Hanrahan. Over the next two decades, Facey's distinctive baritone voice would be heard on The Today Show, Meet the Press, The News with Brian Williams and weekend editions of NBC Nightly News, as well as the network's coverage of political conventions and space shuttle launches and landings.

Besides his news work, his voice was also heard on promos for such programs as Saturday Night Live and Last Call with Carson Daly.

== Death ==
Facey died of cancer in New York at age 72.
