= Dylan Dreyer =

American meteorologist

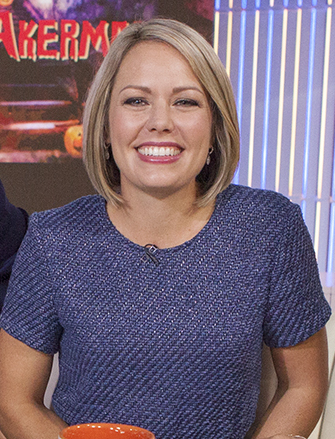
- Dreyer in 2015
- Born: Dylan Marie Dreyer; August 2, 1981 (age 45); Manalapan Township, New Jersey, U.S.
- Education: Rutgers University
- Occupations: Meteorologist; correspondent
- Years active: 2003–present
- Employer: NBCUniversal (Comcast)
- Spouse: Brian Fichera (m. 2012; div. 2026)
- Children: 3

Dylan Marie Dreyer (born August 2, 1981) is an American television meteorologist working for NBC News. Dreyer frequently appears on Today on weekdays as a weather correspondent, and fill-in for Al Roker and Carson Daly. She also appears on The Weather Channel and NBC Nightly News. Dreyer joined NBC News in September 2012, after working at the now former NBC station WHDH in Boston, Massachusetts, since 2007.

== Early life and education ==
Dreyer was born and raised in Manalapan Township, New Jersey, and attended Manalapan High School, where she played softball and graduated in 1999. She earned a bachelor's degree in meteorology from Rutgers University in 2003. While in college, Dreyer briefly interned at WeatherWorks, a private consulting company in Hackettstown, New Jersey.

== Career ==
Dreyer has worked at WICU-TV in Erie, Pennsylvania, WJAR in Providence, Rhode Island, and WHDH in Boston, Massachusetts.

Dreyer was in a car crash while en route to cover a blizzard for Today on February 9, 2013, and suffered a mild concussion.

In addition to her meteorological duties, Dreyer is the host of the NBC educational nature program Earth Odyssey with Dylan Dreyer broadcast on The More You Know block of programming on NBC.

Dreyer reported on the 2017 Kentucky Derby and 2018 Winter Olympics in Pyeongchang, South Korea. In 2022, she hosted the Macy's Thanksgiving Day Parade for the first time, filling in for Al Roker, who was recovering from blood clots.

== Personal life ==
Dreyer married NBC News producer and cameraman Brian Fichera in 2012. They lived in the New York area, and have three children. In July 2025, Dreyer announced that she and Fichera had separated a few months earlier, stating they would continue to co-parent their three children. In October 2026, Dreyer revealed she was "recently divorced" after filing for divorce in March 2026.
