= Jenna Bush Hager =

American journalist, author, and television personality (born 1981)

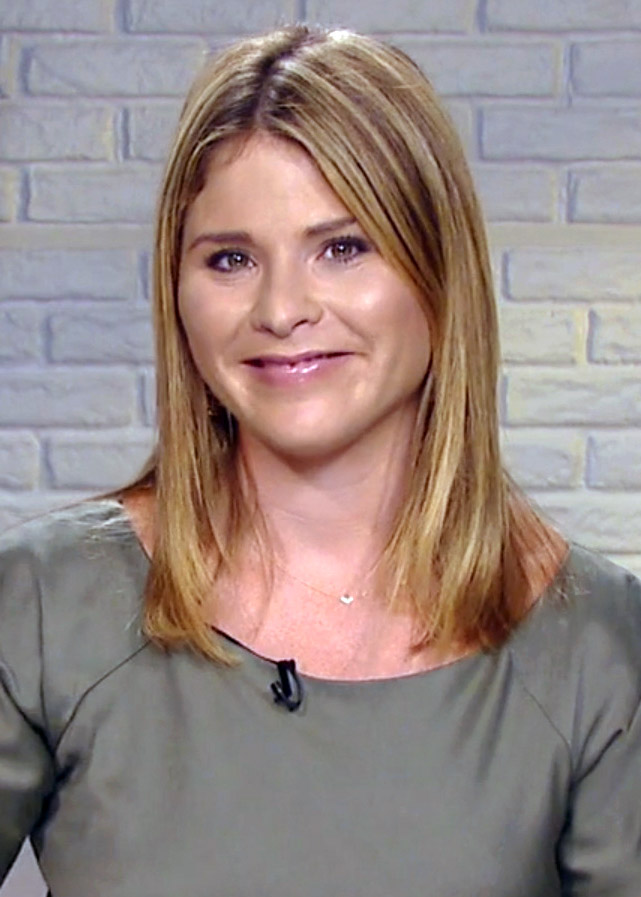
- Bush Hager in 2017
- Born: Jenna Welch Bush; November 25, 1981 (age 44); Dallas, Texas, U.S.
- Education: University of Texas at Austin (BA)
- Occupations: Author; television presenter
- Years active: 2000–present
- Television: Today correspondent (2009–present); Today fourth hour co-host (2019–present)
- Political party: Independent
- Spouse: Henry Hager (m. 2008)
- Children: 3
- Parents: George W. Bush; Laura Bush
- Family: Bush family

Jenna Welch Bush Hager (née Bush; born November 25, 1981) is an American news personality, author, and journalist. She is the co-host of Today with Jenna & Sheinelle, the fourth hour of NBC's morning news program, Today. Hager and her fraternal twin sister, Barbara, are the daughters of the 43rd U.S. president George W. Bush and former first lady Laura Bush.

After her father's presidency ended, Hager became an author, an editor-at-large for Southern Living magazine, and a television personality on NBC, being featured, most prominently, as a member of The Today Show as a correspondent, contributor and co-host.

As a member of the Bush family, Hager is also a granddaughter of the 41st U.S. president George H. W. Bush and former first lady Barbara Bush, great-granddaughter of former U.S. senator Prescott Bush, niece of former Florida governor Jeb Bush, and first cousin of former land commissioner of Texas George P. Bush.

== Early life and education ==
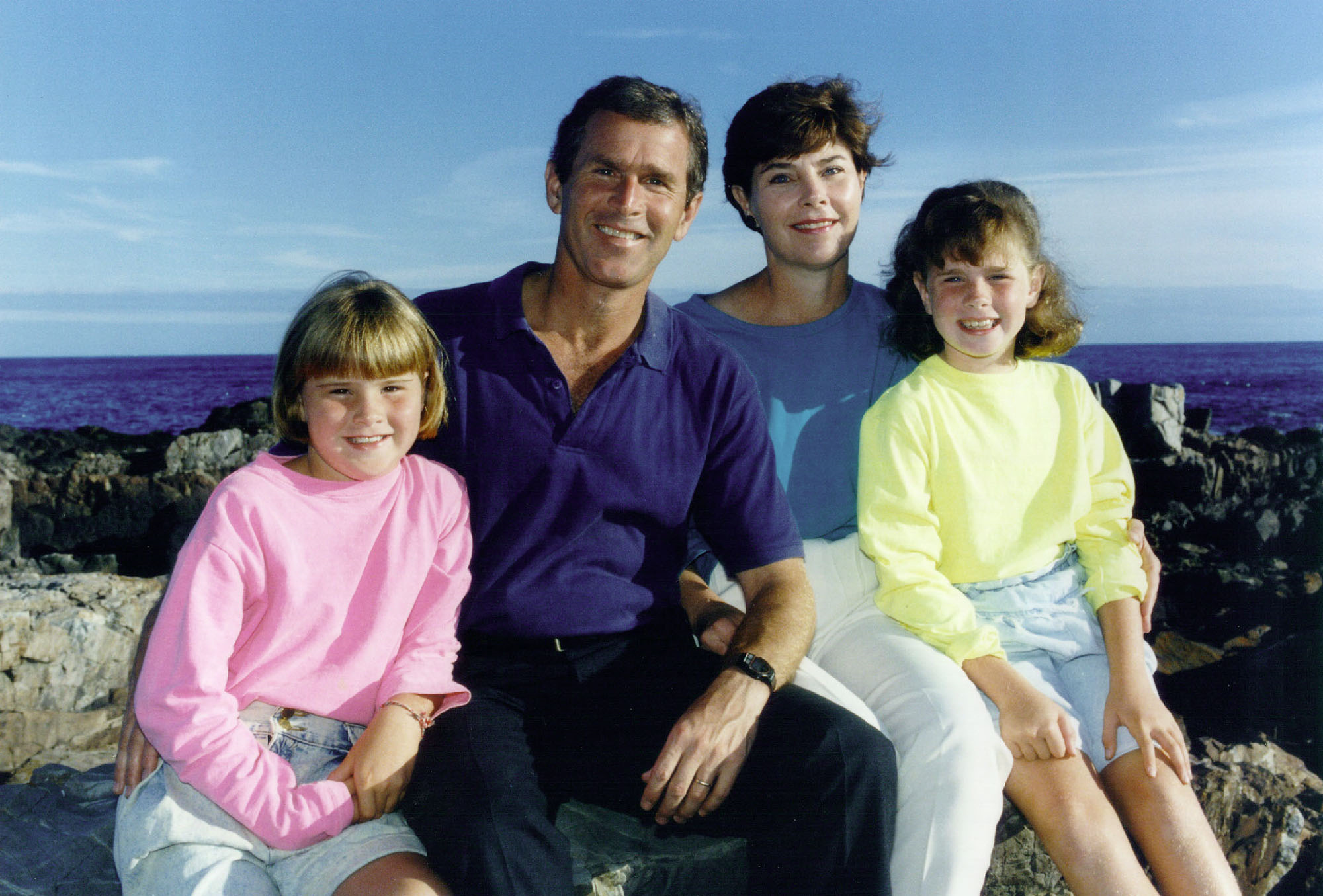
Jenna (leftmost) with her parents, George W. Bush and Laura Bush and her sister, Barbara, in 1990

Jenna Welch Bush was born on November 25, 1981, at Baylor University Medical Center in Dallas, Texas after her older twin sister Barbara. She was named after her maternal grandmother, Jenna Hawkins Welch. While living in Dallas, she and Barbara attended first Preston Hollow Elementary School and then The Hockaday School. In 1994, after her father was elected Governor of Texas and the family moved to Austin, Texas, Bush was a student at St. Andrew's Episcopal School and attended Austin High School from 1996 until her graduation in 2000. She was a Senate page.

As her father became President in 2001, she attended the University of Texas at Austin and took summer classes at New York University. She was a legacy member of Kappa Alpha Theta, her mother's sorority. While there, Jenna and her sister Barbara made national headlines when they were both arrested for alcohol-related charges, twice within five weeks. On April 29, 2001, Jenna was charged with a misdemeanor for possession of alcohol under the age of 21 in Austin. On May 29, 2001, Jenna was charged with another misdemeanor—attempting to use a fake ID (with the name "Barbara Pierce," her paternal grandmother's maiden name) to purchase alcohol. She pleaded no contest to both charges. Jenna Bush graduated from the University of Texas at Austin with a degree in English, in 2004.

== 2004 U.S. presidential election ==
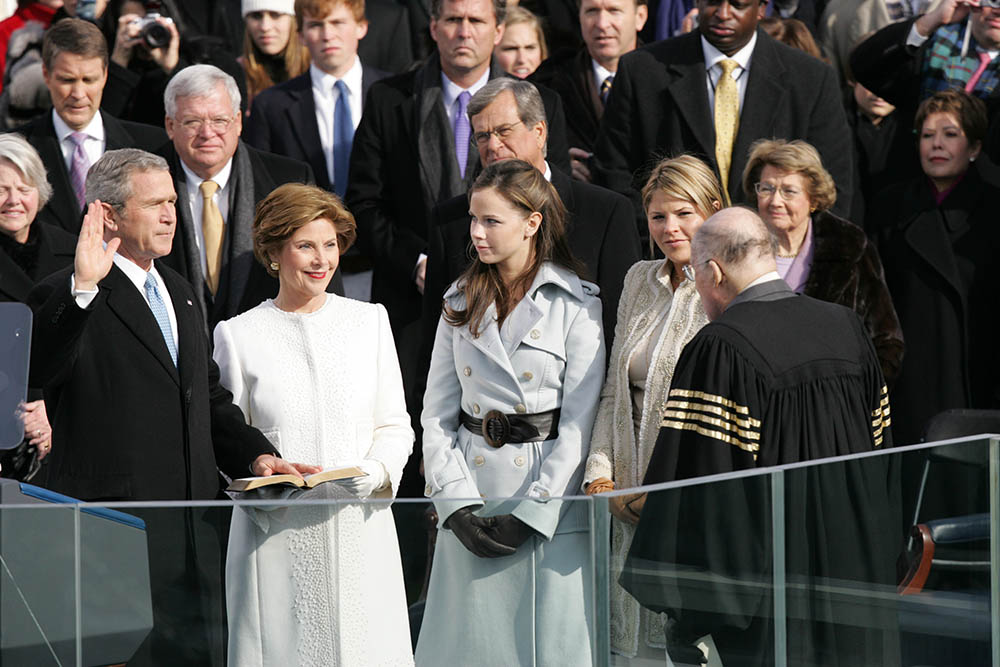
Jenna Bush (second from right) witnesses her father taking the oath on Inauguration Day on January 20, 2005.

Jenna and Barbara asked their father not to run for President of the United States in 2000: "Oh, I just wish you wouldn't run. It's going to change our life." Her father told them that he and her mother needed to live their lives. In the winter of 2003, she and Barbara opted to become involved in the 2004 campaign. In response to this decision, she made media appearances during the summer of 2004, prior to the election. She and her sister made several joint public appearances, including giving a speech to the Republican Convention on August 31, 2004. She made headlines when she was found sticking her tongue out to media photographers at a campaign stop in St. Louis. Jenna and Barbara took turns traveling to swing states with their father, and they also gave a seven-page interview and photo shoot in Vogue. Jenna later confirmed that Barbara and Jenna also developed a friendship with John Kerry's daughters, Alexandra and Vanessa, who campaigned on behalf of their father.

== Career ==
=== Teaching ===
Before leaving Washington, D.C. in summer 2006, Hager worked at Elsie Whitlow Stokes Community Freedom Public Charter School for a year and a half as a teacher's aide. She took a leave of absence from the charter school position to work at a shelter as part of an internship for UNICEF's Educational Policy Department in Latin America, specifically Panama. After her internship for UNICEF, Hager returned to her position at the charter school in Washington, D.C. She has done work as a part-time reading coordinator at the SEED Public Charter School in Baltimore, Maryland, and she has contributed a monthly news story about education for the Today show.

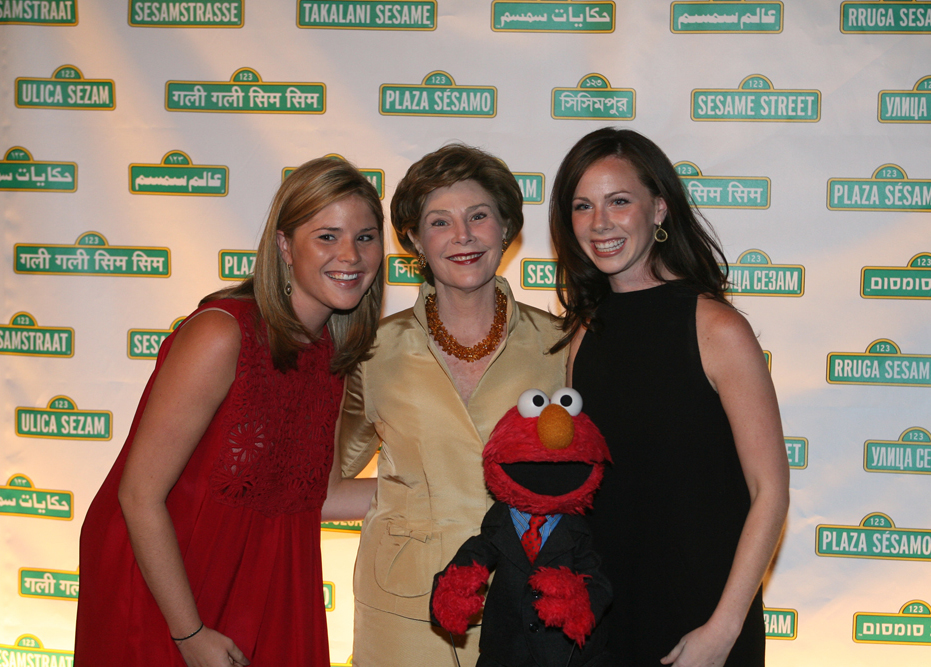
Jenna Hager (left), with her mother, her twin sister, and Elmo, at the Sesame Workshop Fifth Annual Benefit Dinner (2007)

=== Writing ===
In 2007, Hager began marketing a book proposal with the assistance of Robert B. Barnett, a Washington attorney. The title of the book is Ana's Story: A Journey of Hope, and it chronicles her experiences working with UNICEF sponsored charities in Latin America, including visits to drought-stricken Paraguay in 2006, while working as an intern for United Nations Children's Fund. HarperCollins announced in March 2007 it would publish the book, and it was released September 28, 2007, with an initial printing of 500,000 copies. Her share of the profits will go to UNICEF, while the remainder will go to the woman whose life is the basis of the book, assisting in the young woman's continuing education. During the book tour, Hager appeared on The Ellen DeGeneres Show. During the interview, Hager telephoned her parents. Hager wrote a second book, in conjunction with her mother, designed to encourage children to read. The book, entitled Read All About It!, was published on April 22, 2008, also by HarperCollins.

On November 26, 2012, Hager was named editor-at-large of Southern Living magazine.

=== NBC News (2009–present) ===
Since 2009, Jenna Bush has worked at NBC News as a correspondent and at Today as both a contributor and an anchor. In August 2009, NBC hired Hager as a correspondent and contributor for The Today Show.

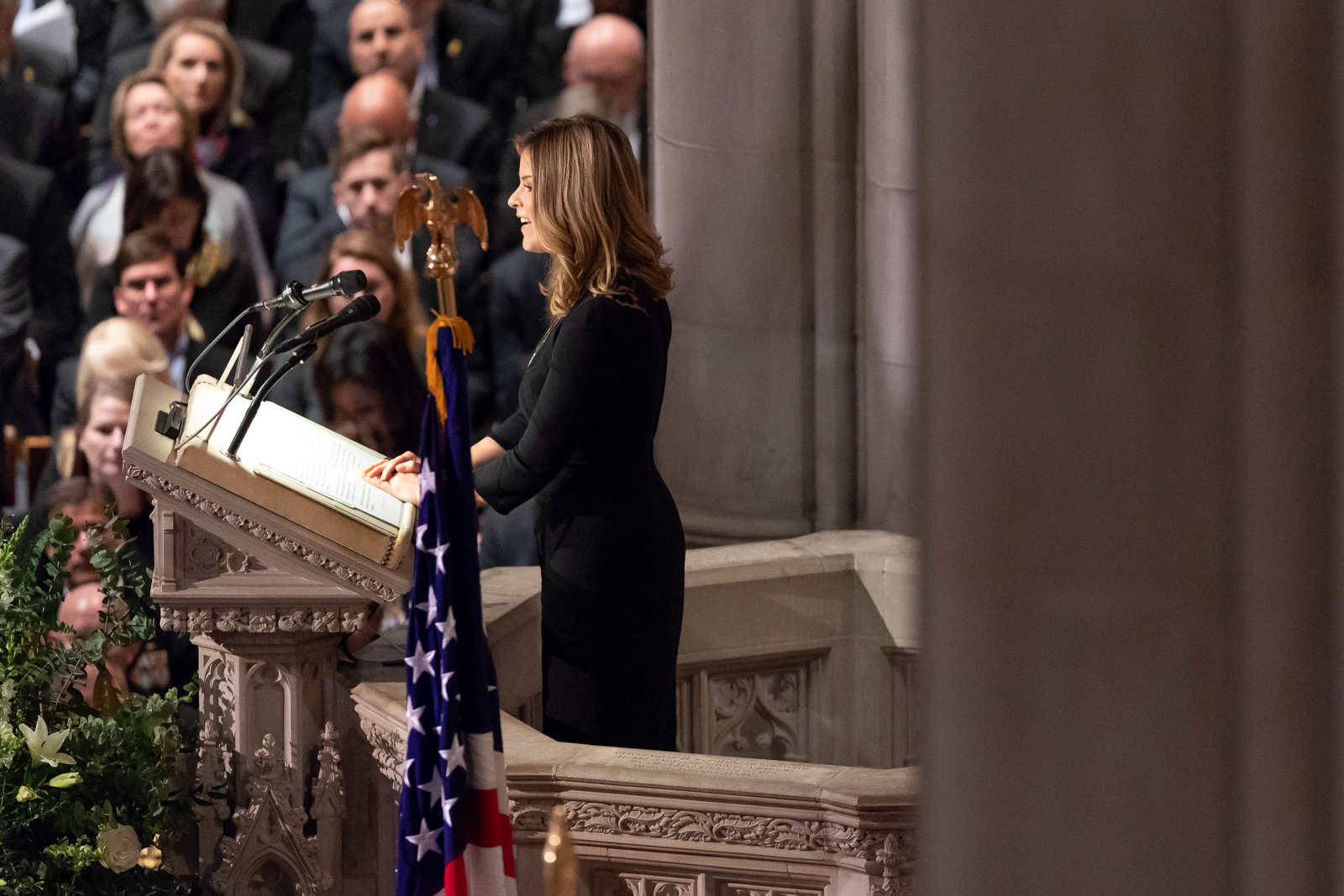
Jenna Hager reading at her grandfather's funeral service (2018)

As time progressed, Hager's profile increased on Today, including filling in as the orange-room anchor during the 7 a.m.-9 a.m. hours and substituting for Kathie Lee Gifford or Hoda Kotb during the fourth hour.

In 2018, she interviewed Michelle Obama in a discussion about her life in the White House, the challenges of raising her daughters in the spotlight, and her book, Becoming. They also discussed the political atmosphere and political bipartisanship, with Obama stating that, despite their political differences, Hager's father, George W. Bush, is a "beautiful, funny, kind, sweet man".

In March 2019, Hager started Read with Jenna, a monthly book club on Today Show. In April 2019, Hager began co-hosting the fourth hour of Today with Hoda Kotb following Kathie Lee Gifford's departure.

In 2019, Hager was able to participate with Willie Geist in a special episode of How Low Will You Go, which aired on the Today Show.

In 2021, Hager reacted emotionally to the storming of the United States Capitol, stating live on air:

I have had the privilege of standing on those steps for several inaugurations, not just for family members but for the first black president of the United States of America. I kissed my grandfather goodbye in that rotunda. I have felt the majesty of our country in those walls, and nobody can take that from any of us.

In February 2022, Hager signed a first-look deal with Universal Studio Group.

In February 2023, she announced her third book, Love Comes First, and sources reported "Jenna's Top Picks" and other endorsement deals.

=== Sports investment ===
In February 2021, The Washington Post reported that Chelsea Clinton, Hager, Dominique Dawes, and Briana Scurry were part of an investment group, investing in the Washington Spirit professional soccer club in the National Women's Soccer League.

=== Book club picks: Read with Jenna ===
In March 2019 on Today, Hager introduced her book club Read with Jenna.

Featured Month	Book Title	Author
November 2026	Sweet Pea	Kit de Waal
October 2026	Partita	Barbara Kingsolver
September 2026	The Witches of Cambridge	Alice Hoffman
August 2026	Sunlight Finds You	Laura Moriarty
July 2026	The Shampoo Effect	Jenny Jackson
June 2026	The Children	Melissa Albert
May 2026	Caller Unknown	Gillian McAllister
April 2026	Upward Bound	Woody Brown
March 2026	Wait for Me	Amy Jo Burns
February 2026	One & Only	Maurene Goo
January 2026	Homeschooled	Stefan Merrill Block
December 2025	Pride and Prejudice	Jane Austen
November 2025	Cursed Daughters	Oyinkan Braithwaite
October 2025	The Irish Goodbye	Heather Aimee O'Neill
September 2025	Buckeye	Patrick Ryan
August 2025	My Other Heart	Emma Nanami Strenner
July 2025	Happy Wife	Meredith Lavender and Kendall Shores
June 2025	A Family Matter	Claire Lynch
May 2025	The Names	Florence Knapp
April 2025	Heartwood	Amity Gaige
March 2025	The Dream Hotel	Leila Lalami
February 2025	This is a Love Story	Jessica Soffer
January 2025	The Life Cycle of the Common Octopus	Emma Knight
December 2024	Devotions	Mary Oliver
November 2024	This Motherless Land	Nikki May
October 2024	The Mighty Red	Louise Erdrich
September 2024	Blue Sisters	Coco Mellors
August 2024	The Wedding People	Alison Espach
July 2024	All the Colors of the Dark	Chris Whitaker
June 2024	Swift River	Essie Chambers
May 2024	Real Americans	Rachel Khong
April 2024	The Husbands	Holly Gramazio
March 2024	The House on Mango Street	Sandra Cisneros
March 2024	The Great Divide	Cristina Henriquez
February 2024	Good Material	Dolly Alderton
January 2024	The Waters	Bonnie Jo Campbell
December 2023	We Must Not Think of Ourselves	Lauren Grodstein
November 2023	The Sun Sets in Singapore	Kehinde Fadipe
October 2023	How to Say Babylon	Safiya Sinclair
September 2023	Amazing Grace Adams	Fran Littlewood
August 2023	Summer Sisters	Judy Blume
July 2023	Banyan Moon	Thai Thao
June 2023	The Celebrants	Steven Rowley
May 2023	Chain-Gang All-Stars	Nana Kwame Adjei-Brenyah
April 2023	Camp Zero	Michelle Min Sterling
March 2023	Black Candle Women	Diane Marie Brown
February 2023	Maame	Jessica George
January 2023	Sam	Allegra Goodman
December 2022	The Secret History	Donna Tartt
November 2022	The Cloisters	Katy Hays
October 2022	The Whalebone Theatre	Joanna Quinn
September 2022	Solito	Javier Zamora
August 2022	The Many Daughters of Afong	Jamie Ford
July 2022	The Measure	Nikki Erlick
June 2022	These Impossible Things	Salma El-Wardany
May 2022	Remarkably Bright Creatures	Shelby Van Pelt
April 2022	Memphis	Tara M. Stringfellow
March 2022	Groundskeeping	Lee Cole
February 2022	Black Cake	Charmaine Wilkerson
January 2022	The School for Good Mothers	Jessamine Chan
December 2021	Bright Burning Things	Lisa Harding
November 2021	The Family	Naomi Krupitsky
October 2021	The Lincoln Highway	Amor Towles
September 2021	Beautiful Country	Qian Julie Wang
August 2021	The Turnout	Megan Abbott
July 2021	Hell of a Book	Jason Mott
June 2021	Malibu Rising	Taylor Jenkins Reid
May 2021	Great Circle	Maggie Shipstead
April 2021	Good Company	Cynthia D'Aprix Sweeney
March 2021	What's Mine and Yours	Naima Coster
February 2021	Send for Me	Lauren Fox
February 2021	The Four Winds	Kristin Hannah
January 2021	Black Buck	Mateo Askaripour
December 2020	The Bluest Eye	Toni Morrison
November 2020	White Ivy	Susie Yang
October 2020	Leave the World Behind	Rumaan Alam
September 2020	Transcendent Kingdom	Yaa Gyasi
August 2020	Here For It	R. Eric Thomas
August 2020	The Comeback	Ella Berman
July 2020	Friends and Strangers	J. Courtney Sullivan
June 2020	A Burning	Megha Majumdar
May 2020	All Adults Here	Emma Straub
April 2020	Valentine	Elizabeth Wetmore
March 2020	Writers & Lovers	Lily King
February 2020	The Girl With the Louding Voice	Abi Daré
January 2020	Dear Edward	Ann Napolitano
December 2019	Late Migrations	Margaret Renkl
November 2019	Nothing to See Here	Kevin Wilson
October 2019	The Dutch House	Ann Patchett
September 2019	The Dearly Beloved	Cara Wall
August 2019	Patsy	Nicole Dennis-Benn
July 2019	Evvie Drake Starts Over	Linda Holmes
June 2019	Searching for Sylvie Lee	Jean Kwok
May 2019	A Woman Is No Man	Etaf Rum
April 2019	The Unwinding of the Miracle	Julie Yip-Williams
March 2019	The Last Romantics	Tara Conklin

In 2022, Hager expanded her book list to children's reading, called Read with Jenna Jr.

In September 2023, Hager introduced the podcast she hosts, Open Book with Jenna, wherein she interviews authors.

== Personal life ==
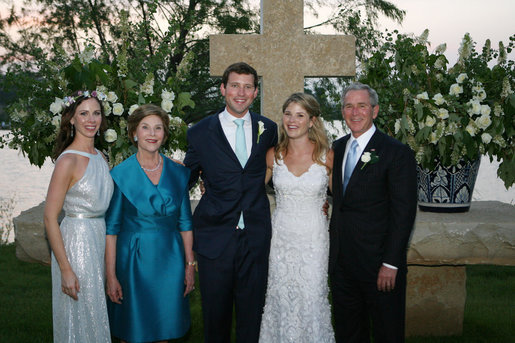
Barbara Bush (left), Laura Bush, newlyweds Henry and Jenna Hager, and George W. Bush shortly after the wedding ceremony on May 10, 2008, at the Prairie Chapel Ranch near Crawford, Texas

Bush met Henry Chase Hager during the 2004 presidential campaign. They became engaged in August 2007. Before proposing, Hager asked President Bush for permission to marry his daughter. Their relationship became public when the two appeared together at a White House dinner for the Prince of Wales and his new wife the Duchess of Cornwall (now King Charles III and Queen Camilla) in November 2005. Henry Hager attended St. Christopher's School, in Richmond, Virginia, and he holds an MBA from the Darden Graduate School of Business Administration at the University of Virginia. He worked as a U.S. Department of Commerce aide, for Carlos Gutierrez, and as a White House aide, for Karl Rove. He is the son of former Virginia Republican Party Chairman John H. Hager, who previously served as Lieutenant Governor of Virginia and as the U.S. Department of Education Assistant Secretary, under George W. Bush. The wedding took place during a private ceremony, on May 10, 2008, at her parents' Prairie Chapel Ranch, near Crawford, Texas. Henry and Jenna Hager have three children.

Unlike most of her relatives (but like her twin sister, Barbara), Hager is not a member of the Republican Party. While registering to vote in New York, she mistakenly registered with the Independence Party of New York while meaning to declare herself a nonpartisan. In 2010, Jenna Bush Hager and Barbara Bush told People that they preferred not to identify with any political party, stating, "We're both very independent thinkers."

Hager serves on the board of the Greenwich International Film Festival.

== Bibliography ==
- Bush, Jenna (2007). Ana's Story : A Journey of Hope. HarperCollins. ISBN 978-0-06-137908-6.
- Bush, Laura; Bush, Jenna (2008). Read All About It!. HarperCollins. ISBN 9780061560774.
- Bush, Laura; Bush, Jenna (2016). Our Great Big Backyard. HarperCollins. ISBN 9780062468369.
- Bush, Barbara Pierce; Bush Hager, Jenna (2017). Sisters First: Stories from Our Wild and Wonderful Life. New York: Grand Central Publishing. ISBN 9781538711415. OCLC 972386724.
- Bush, Jenna (2020). Everything Beautiful in Its Time: Seasons of Love and Loss. HarperCollins. ISBN 978-0062960627.

== See also ==
- New Yorkers in journalism
- Today (American TV program)#Fourth hour
