= Amity Gaige =

American novelist (born 1972)

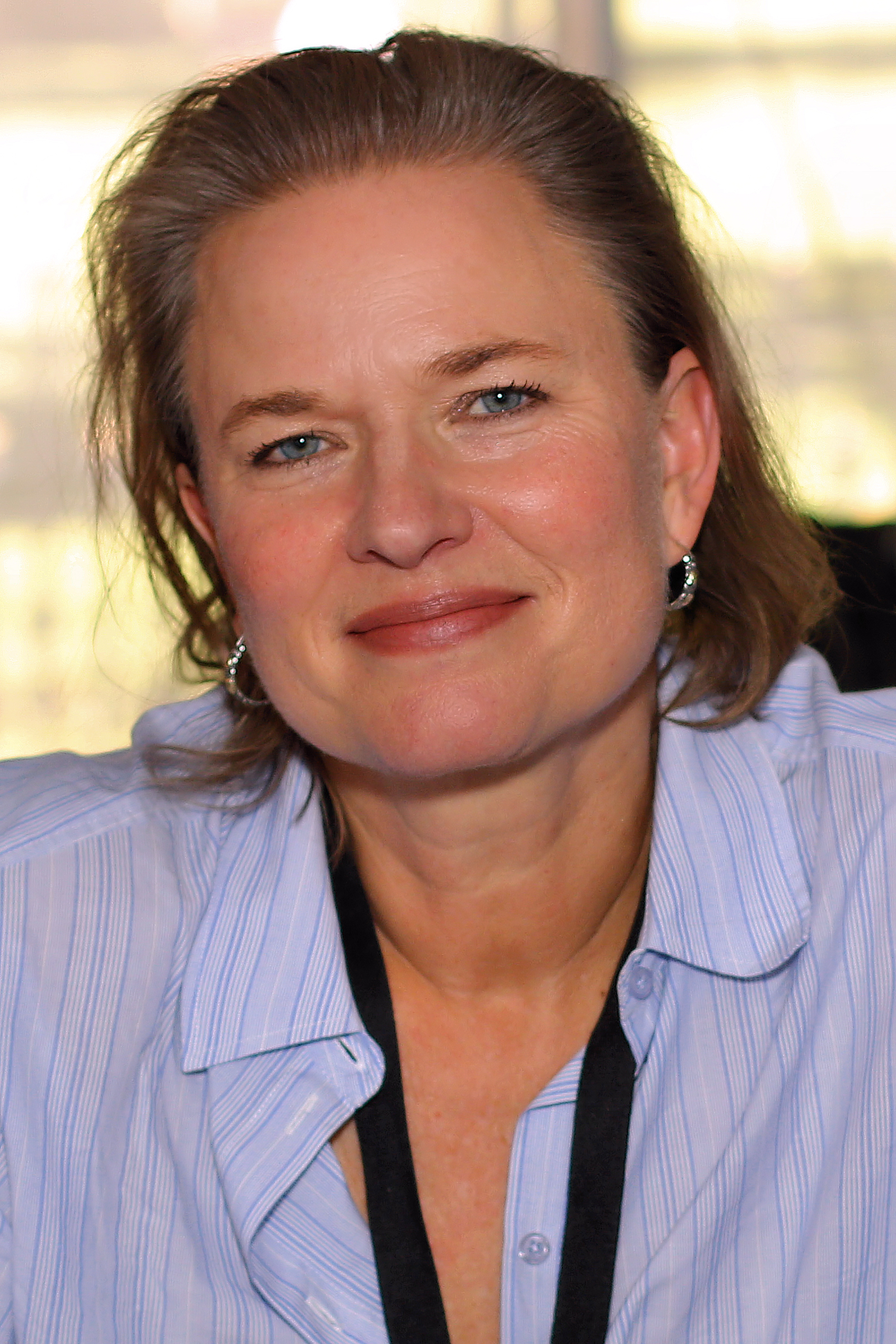
- Gaige at the 2025 Texas Book Festival
- Born: 1972 (age 53–54); Charlotte, North Carolina, U.S.
- Education: Brown University; Iowa Writers' Workshop
- Spouse: Tim Watt
- Writing career
- Genre: Novel
- Notable awards: 5 Under 35 Honoree

Amity Gaige (born 1972) is an American novelist. She has written five books and was a 2016 Guggenheim Fellow in Fiction. Gaige is also an academic, currently working as a lecturer in English at Yale University.

== Early life and education ==
Amity Gaige was born in Charlotte, North Carolina. Her father was an academic and her mother was a psychologist. Her family moved several times before settling in Reading, Pennsylvania.

Gaige attended Brown University where she studied English and theater. She graduated in 1995. In 1999, Gaige obtained an M.F.A. from the Iowa Writers' Workshop.

== Career ==
Gaige's first novel, O My Darling, was released in 2005. The book earned plaudits and helped her earn a place in the inaugural National Book Foundation's 5 Under 35 Awards. Her second novel, The Folded World, was published two years later. It garnered independent publishing awards that year.

In 2013, her third novel, Schroder was released. It was a shortlist nominee for Britain's inaugural GB£40,000 Folio Prize in 2014. The novel stirred controversy in its depiction of a reckless young father who flees with his six-year-old daughter on a road trip through New England after a custody battle. The author drew inspiration from the real-life Christian Gerhartsreiter story, though the book is not a novelization of that story. In style and form, Schroder drew comparison to works by Nabokov. The Los Angeles Times wrote "Schroder's closest literary relative is probably Lolita (minus the pedophilia)." Kathryn Schulz suggested that Gaige intended Schroder as an homage and an "appropriation" of Lolita in New York magazine which published a scratched-out image of Nabokov's cover art. Gaige also cited Pale Fire as an influence in an interview with The New York Times' John Williams. The book was sold pre-publication for translation into fifteen languages, and was endorsed on the Dutch television show De Wereld Draait Door, sending the book into numerous reprintings. In the U.S., the book won endorsements from Jonathan Franzen and Jennifer Egan, and was reviewed in nearly every major print outlet, making it one of the most heavily reviewed books of the year. According to WorldCat, the book is held in 3,873 libraries, with editions in 8 languages.

In 2020, Gaige's fourth novel, Sea Wife, was published. The novel was selected as a Group Text pick by Elisabeth Egan of The New York Times, who wrote in her review, "Gaige tows you to tragedy with the graceful crawl of a poet and the motorboat intensity of a suspense author. And yet, when you find yourself at the deep end of this book, gasping for breath, you will still be shocked by what you find at the bottom." People selected Sea Wife as a Book of the Week. They wrote, "Gaige's razor-sharp novel is wise to marital and broader politics. But it's also such gripping escapism that it feels like a lifeboat." In an interview with Susan Choi in The Millions, Gaige talked about the research involved in writing a book set at sea: "It's possible that the tension the reader feels in reading Sea Wife runs parallel to the tension of the author trying to write it. Maybe I've bought into a kind of Stanislavskian theory of needing the stakes of my writing to be as high as those of my characters. The process was not without casualty."

Gaige's fifth novel, Heartwood, was published in 2025. Heartwood was selected by Jenna Bush Hager of the Today with Jenna & Friends as her "Read With Jenna" book club selection for April 2025. The novel received positive reviews in The Washington Post, the Wall Street Journal, and Boston.com.

== Bibliography ==
- O My Darling (Other Press, 2005)
- The Folded World, (Other Press, Random House, 2007)
- Schroder (Twelve Books, 2013)
- Sea Wife, (Knopf, 2020) ISBN 978-0-525-65649-4
- Heartwood, (Simon & Schuster, 2025) ISBN 978-1-6680-6360-6

== Awards and honors ==
- In 2006, Gaige was one of five writers selected for the National Book Foundation's 5 Under 35 honor.
- 2014, Gaige was placed on the Folio Prize shortlist for her novel Schroder.
