= Today with Jenna & Sheinelle =

American daytime television talk show

- Also known as: The fourth hour of Today (2007–present); Today with Kathie Lee and Hoda (2008–2019); Today with Hoda & Jenna (2019–2025); Today with Jenna & Friends (2025–2026)
- Genre: Talk show; Comedy
- Presented by: Jenna Bush Hager; Sheinelle Jones
- Announcer: Les Marshak
- Opening theme: "There's More Today, Everyday" by 615 Music (2007–2017); "Hoda and Jenna" by Meghan Trainor (2024–2025); "We're Shining" by Blessing Offor (since 2026)
- No. of seasons: 11 (as of 2019)

Production
- Executive producers: Amy Rosenblum (2007); Tammy Filler (2017–2019); Joanne LaMarca Mathisen (2019–2021); Talia Parkinson-Jones (2021–present)
- Production locations: NBC Studios; New York, New York
- Camera setup: Multi-camera
- Running time: 44–52 minutes

Original release
- Network: NBC
- Release: September 10, 2007 – present

Related
- Today

Today with Jenna & Sheinelle (also known as the fourth hour of Today or simply Jenna & Sheinelle) is an American daytime television talk show on NBC, co-hosted by Jenna Bush Hager and Sheinelle Jones. The program airs as the fourth hour of NBC's Today at 10:00 a.m. in all time zones (subject to local delay) as a "show-within-a-show" with its own hosts, opening sequence, theme music, and website. The Monday through Thursday editions of this portion of the program air live in the Eastern Time Zone and on tape delay elsewhere; the Friday edition is pre-recorded.

The program originally began on September 10, 2007 as an expansion of Today, hosted by Ann Curry, Natalie Morales and Hoda Kotb. The program gained prominence as its own distinct entity as Today with Kathie Lee and Hoda, after Kotb was joined by Kathie Lee Gifford from April 2008 to April 2019. Hager succeeded Gifford, and has been a co-host since 2019, when the program became Today with Hoda & Jenna. Following Kotb's departure in January 2025, the program became Today with Jenna & Friends featuring a rotating guest co-host format until 2026, when Jones joined as permanent co-host.

== History ==
=== 2007–2008: Start of the fourth hour ===
On January 17, 2007, at its press tour sessions, NBC News announced that Today would be expanded to four hours beginning that fall. To make room on its schedule for the expansion, NBC – rather than disrupting an hour of programming time already allocated for syndicated or local programming on its stations – made the decision to cancel the low-rated daytime soap opera Passions and use that hour allocation for the new fourth hour.

The fourth hour debuted on September 10, 2007, originally hosted by Ann Curry, Natalie Morales, and Hoda Kotb. Today executive producer Jim Bell tasked senior Today producer Amy Rosenblum to oversee the new hour. To promote the new hour, 615 Music created an original song for the campaign titled "There's More Today, Everyday" for NBC. The song's instrumental version became the program's opening theme and was nominated for "Outstanding Original Song - Main Title and Promo" at the 36th Daytime Emmy Awards in 2009.

External videos
- TODAY's "New" Fourth Hour, archived by Today on YouTube. The fourth hour debuts in 2007 with Ann Curry, Natalie Morales, and Hoda Kotb.
- Kathie Lee's First TODAY Broadcast, archived by Today on YouTube. Kathie Lee Gifford's fourth hour debut.

=== 2008–2019: Kathie Lee and Hoda ===
Kathie Lee Gifford first appeared as a guest co-host on the fourth hour on November 14, 2007, after being approached by Kotb and Rosenblum to fill in for Curry and Morales. Later in the same year, NBC offered Gifford a role on Today, which Gifford turned down. Thinking she couldn't "do better" than her time at Live with Regis and Kathie Lee, Gifford had no interest in returning to daytime television, but agreed to a lunch set up with Kotb at the Rainbow Room. Both Kotb and Gifford were aware the program was "dull" and wasn't working. In December 2007, Alessandra Stanley of The New York Times reviewed the fourth hour saying the program "[felt] less like an extension of the [earlier] three-hour show than a cozy Tupperware party that never ends." Later that month, Rosenblum was part of a staff reduction at NBC News. On March 8, 2008, The New York Times reported that NBC was working on a deal to hire Gifford after struggling to find an audience for its fourth hour, with viewership lagging behind The View and The Price Is Right. Gifford signed on for one year, and on March 31, 2008, Today announced that Gifford would join the program as co-host. According to Gifford, Kotb was the main reason for her return to morning television.

Logo for Kathie Lee and Hoda from 2008 to 2019

Gifford debuted as co-host on April 7, 2008, replacing Curry and Morales. Over time, the program became more of its own distinct entity, and was referred to more as simply Kathie Lee & Hoda (or KLG & Hoda), with its own website and social media presence. The fourth hour does not have news or weather segments (other than local newsbreaks aired during the first half-hour on some NBC stations, provided they air the fourth hour at 10:00 a.m.) or input from the earlier hosts and is structured virtually as a standalone talk show, with an opening "host chat" segment reminiscent of the one popularized by Gifford and Regis Philbin on Live! with Regis and Kathie Lee, as well as interviews and features focusing on entertainment, fashion and other topics aimed at female viewers.

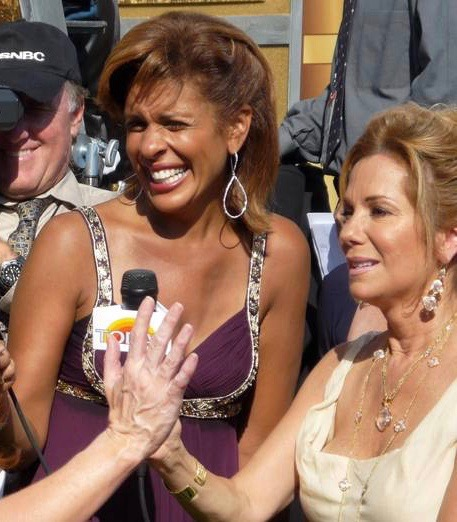
Hoda Kotb (left) and Kathie Lee Gifford (right) in 2008

Kathie Lee & Hoda competed with ABC's The View and CBS' The Price Is Right in most markets in the Central and Pacific Time Zones, but most stations in the Eastern Time Zone aired it live one hour before those programs, as ABC and CBS's late morning daytime programs are not tape delayed for each time zone. Not all NBC affiliates carried Kathie Lee & Hoda live. The program aired on tape delay in some markets that aired it later in the morning or early afternoons at the station's discretion to make room for local news or syndicated programming.

The show was most notable for its frequent use and display of wine on-air which began in 2008, when vodka cocktails were brought out as a joke to comedian Chelsea Handler, who appeared on the show to promote her book Are You There, Vodka? It's Me, Chelsea. The following week, actress Brooke Shields asked about her own cocktail. As a result, Time called the show Today's "happy hour", which became an unofficial name. In November 2010, Joel McHale appeared on the show to promote NBC's Community and brought his own bottle of scotch whisky. Prior to his appearance, McHale had been mocking Gifford and Kotb on his E! show The Soup. During the interview, the following was said:

Kotb: "Why do you continue to mock our show?"
McHale: "Have you seen your show?"

McHale's interview was explained by Kelsea Stahler of Hollywood.com:

The ongoing joke about hosts Hoda Kotb and Kathy [sic] Lee Gifford is that they get up the courage to 'entertain' us with an entire hour of inane banter by getting a little toasty first. [...] McHale (and everyone else, including SNL) reiterates this point over and over again on The Soup – perhaps because the ladies continue to act like they’re blasted on a daily basis.

In a 2014 interview, Gifford told Variety: "People just assume we are drinking wine the whole time, but the reality is most days it just sits there." Gifford has also said that they have a sip once or twice but the wine is used mainly as a prop to be funny. Viewers have criticized NBC and Today for promoting perceived alcoholism on morning television. In 2019, the show claimed to have consumed over 5,300 glasses of wine over the years.

On September 26, 2011, NBC began to rebroadcast Kathie Lee & Hoda as part of its overnight lineup (formerly known as NBC All Night) on weekday early mornings at 2:05 a.m. Eastern and Pacific Time (varied according to local scheduling; although the rebroadcast is pre-empted by NBC affiliates in a few markets, such as those owned by Graham Media Group), as a replacement for Poker After Dark, which was canceled due to legal issues involving that show's sponsor Full Tilt Poker and televised poker in general.

On December 11, 2018, NBC and Gifford announced that she will be retiring from her position of anchoring the fourth hour in April 2019, her 11th anniversary since joining Today. Kotb would continue anchoring the fourth hour. Gifford's final day was on April 5, 2019.

=== 2019–2025: Hoda & Jenna ===
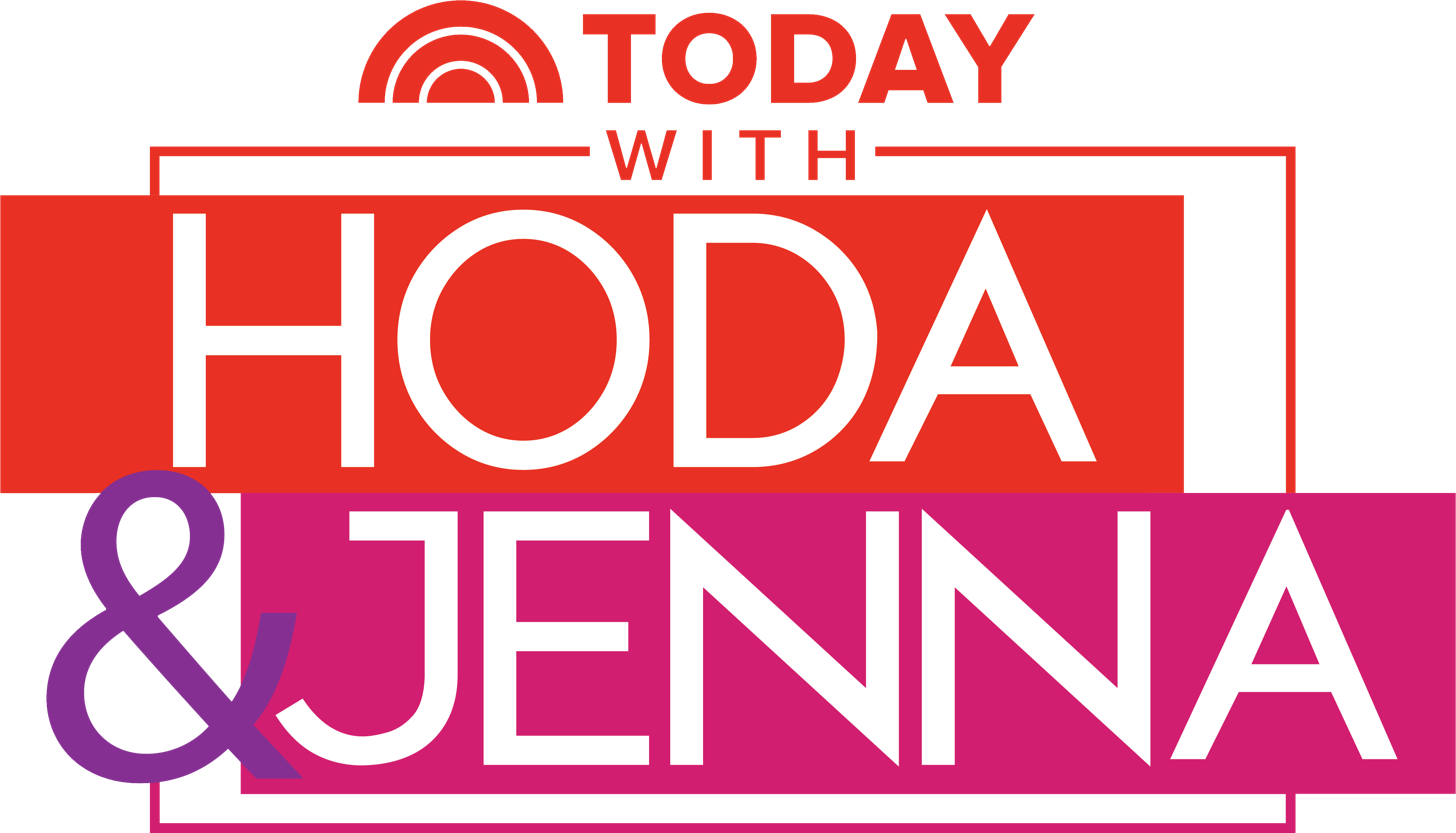
Logo for Hoda & Jenna from 2019 to 2025

On February 26, 2019, NBC announced that Jenna Bush Hager would replace Gifford on the fourth hour of Today after Gifford's departure on April 5, 2019. The renamed Today with Hoda & Jenna premiered on April 8, 2019. Joanne LaMarca Mathisen, who previously served as senior producer and left in January 2017, returned to NBC to become the new executive producer. Tammy Filler, the executive producer for Kathie Lee and Hoda since July 2017, left Today to become executive vice president and editor-in-chief of E! News.

In the fall of 2019, a number of NBC stations and affiliates also carrying the syndicated NBCUniversal Television Distribution program The Kelly Clarkson Show began to carry a late-night repeat of that show instead of Hoda & Jenna to give the former an additional cumulative ratings boost. Those stations that do not air Kelly or prefer to air it only once per day continued to carry Hoda & Jenna until March 28, 2022, when NBC replaced its late-night rebroadcast of Hoda & Jenna with a rebroadcast of Top Story with Tom Llamas from NBC News Now.

It was revealed on the 2019 Halloween show that Kotb and Hager had only hosted five shows together since the premiere of the revamped hour in April 2019, due to both women being away for parental leave. On the same day, Hager announced she would return on November 11, 2019.

On January 16, 2020, Kotb and Hager announced that the Thursday and Friday editions of Hoda & Jenna would be recorded in front of a live studio audience starting February 6, 2020, and called Hoda & Jenna & Friends. The revamped editions were broadcast from Studio 6A, formerly used by Megyn Kelly Today, instead of Studio 1A. However, the program would later return to Studio 1A due to the COVID-19 pandemic, with another NBC program The Tonight Show Starring Jimmy Fallon moving into Studio 6A. On October 6, 2021, it was announced that former co-executive producer of The Wendy Williams Show and Tamron Hall, Talia Parkinson-Jones would be named the new executive producer of the show taking the place of LaMarca Mathisen.

In the fall of 2022, the program began shifting to a "feel-good" approach with the introduction of a new opening theme on September 12, 2022, filmed at Summit One Vanderbilt. Parkison-Jones told E! News, "That's essentially what the show is about. When you see the open, you feel inspired. You see the ladies having fun and I just feel like it's a true reflection of the hour." On September 4, 2024, Hoda & Jenna debuted a new opening theme performed by Meghan Trainor. The theme music was originally revealed on April 8, 2024, during the 5th anniversary of Hoda & Jenna. Trainor had previously created "Wake Up to Kathie Lee and Hoda", a theme song for Kathie Lee & Hoda.

On September 26, 2024, Kotb announced she would be stepping down as co-anchor of Today in early 2025, but would still remain at NBC. On November 14, 2024, Kotb's final day on Today was announced for January 10, 2025. While Craig Melvin was announced as Kotb's successor as co-anchor for the earlier hours of Today, it was announced that the fourth hour would become Today with Jenna & Friends, starting January 13, 2025, featuring a rotating cast of fill-in hosts until a permanent host is named. Kotb departed Today on January 10, 2025 and the following week marked the first time none of the co-hosts from the original iteration of the fourth hour were part of the program. The final Hoda & Jenna show, dubbed the "Hoda-bration", was hosted in Studio 8G, the studio for Late Night with Seth Meyers, and included guests Gayle King, Jimmy Fallon, and former co-host Gifford. In 2026, the "Hoda-bration" show was nominated for a Daytime Emmy Award for "Outstanding Directing for a Daytime Studio Non-Fiction Series".

=== 2025–2026: Jenna & Friends ===
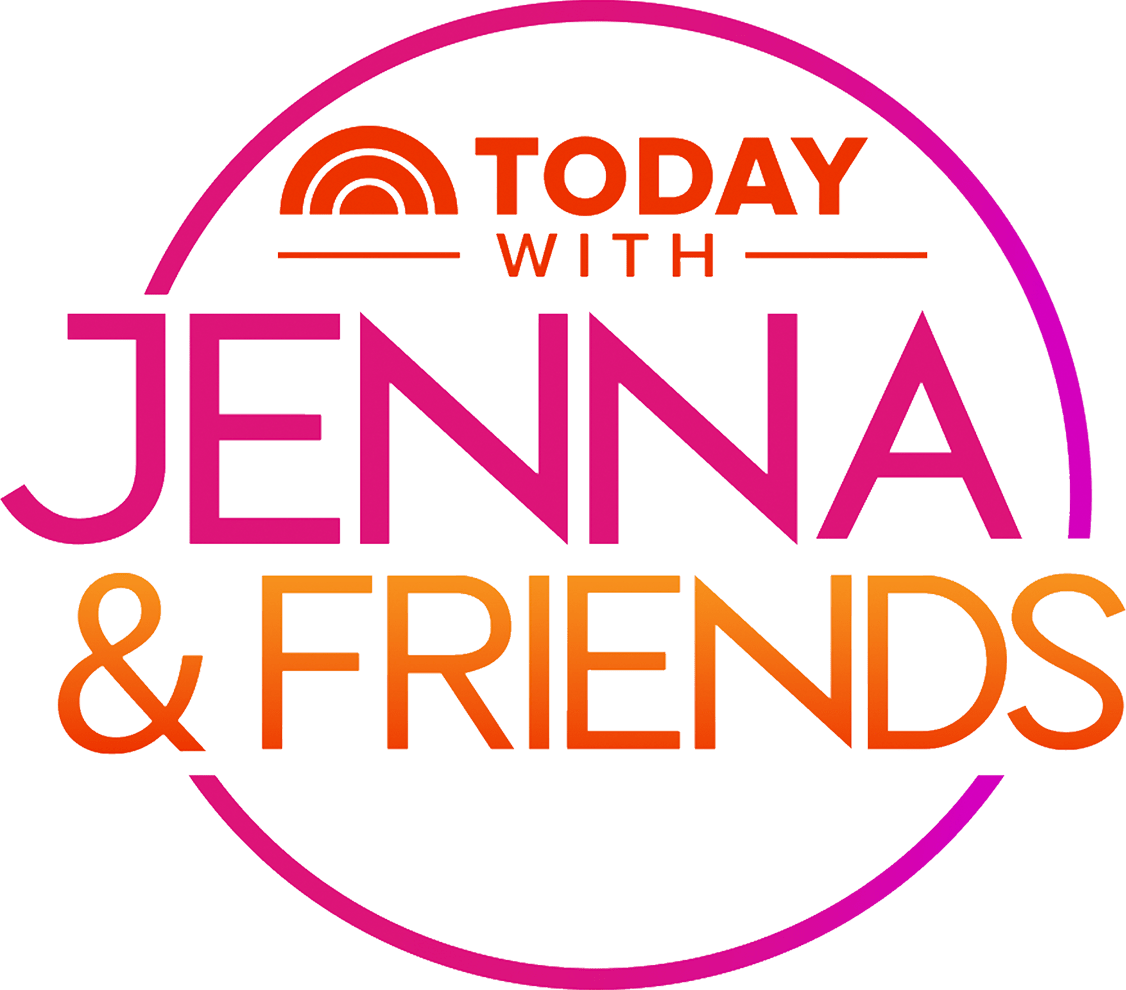
Jenna & Friends logo in 2025

On the week of Kotb's departure, Taraji P. Henson, Eva Longoria, Keke Palmer and Michelle Buteau were announced as guest co-hosts for the first week of Jenna & Friends. On January 6, 2025, a few days before the premiere of Jenna and Friends, a new opening theme was revealed. Speaking with Variety, Parkinson-Jones said their goal was to find "a match" and compared the guest co-hosts to dating: "We’re in this new version of the show, and it’s really Jenna’s dating. We get a chance to meet different people, and we’ll fall in love one day, but until then we’re just having a really good time."

Actress Scarlett Johansson was named for the second week and co-hosted for a week. Johansson's co-hosting was met with positive feedback from fans, with many praising Johansson's chemistry with Hager, and suggesting a more permanent role for Johansson. Hager suggested starting a GoFundMe to hire Johansson. Speaking to People, Johansson called her role "a complete dream". Johansson later co-hosted again for four days in December 2025.

Jenna & Friends had a wide range of guest co-hosts, totaling 60 which the program referred to as "contenders". Within NBC News, Savannah Guthrie, Willie Geist, Hoda Kotb, Sheinelle Jones, Craig Melvin, Dylan Dreyer, Carson Daly, Maria Shriver, Al Roker, Donna Farizan, and NBC Nightly News anchor Tom Llamas appeared as co-hosts.

During the week of SNL's 50th anniversary special, SNL alums and cast members Amy Poehler, Ana Gasteyer, Mikey Day, Cheri Oteri, and Chloe Fineman co-hosted the program. Ego Nwodim, Bowen Yang, and Tina Fey also co-hosted separately.

In March 2025, Hager's family members Barbara Bush Coyne, cousins Wendy Stapleton and Sam Bush LeBlond, and husband Henry Hager co-hosted.

Additional co-hosts have included figures in television, film, and music, including singers Ciara, Kelsea Ballerini, Kimberly Schlapman, Wynonna Judd, John Legend, Sheryl Crow, and rapper Cardi B; personalities Justin Sylvester, Andy Cohen, Tyra Banks, Erin Andrews, and Dwyane Wade; actors Regina Hall, Brooke Shields, Olivia Munn, Andrew Rannells, Tiffany Haddish, Halle Berry, Niecy Nash, Octavia Spencer, Jay Ellis, Leslie Bibb, Ayesha Curry, Rosie Perez, and Anthony Ramos; and comedians Heather McMahan, Matt Rogers, Henry Winkler, Wanda Sykes, Ken Jeong, Nikki Glaser, Leanne Morgan, and Chelsea Handler. Former First Lady of the United States Michelle Obama joined as a special guest on November 4, 2025.

=== 2026: Jenna & Sheinelle ===
On December 9, 2025, it was announced that Today 3rd Hour co-host Sheinelle Jones would step away from the 9 a.m. hour to succeed Kotb as permanent co-host of the fourth hour. The program was renamed Today with Jenna and Sheinelle on January 12, 2026, ending the rotating guest co-host format. According to media analyst Brian Stelter, following Jones' return to Today in September 2025, Jones had been seen as a leading candidate for the 10 a.m. hour. NBC executives are expecting Hager and Jones to grow into a duo similar to Gifford/Kotb during the Kathie Lee and Hoda era.

On the premiere of Jenna & Sheinelle, a new theme song titled "We're Shining" by Blessing Offor debuted. Kotb and Gifford also appeared as guests to pass a "wine torch" to Hager and Jones.

== Recurring elements ==
The show's signature element is its opening "host chat" segment where the latest entertainment headlines and stories are discussed. This segment was called Today's Talk during the Kathie Lee and Hoda era of the program, however that name has not been used since Hager joined the program as co-host.

=== Segments ===
The show has had many recurring segments throughout its years. They include:

==== Current ====
- Ambush Makeover is a segment on Thursdays where select fans who show up in Rockefeller Plaza get a makeover.
- All Rise for Judge ________ (guest's name) is a game where they ask a guest their argument on a few topics.
- Chooseday is a segment on Tuesdays where viewers vote from a selection of three outfits each for Hoda & Jenna to wear the next day on the show.
- Social Dilemmas and Relationship Dilemmas are segments where the co-hosts give advice for viewer's issues or situations.
- Read with Jenna is a monthly on-air book discussion club in the style of Oprah's Book Club. The segment started in March 2019 when Hager chose the book The Last Romantics by Tara Conklin. Due to the size of the Today Show's audience, most of the books chosen by her have become instant best-sellers.
- The Scoop is a segment where they talk about the latest celebrity news and gossip. At the end of the year, they do a special year-in-review version called The Scoopies.
- Weekend Watchlist is a segment that provides movie and TV recommendations to binge.

==== Former ====
- Elvis Duran's Artist of the Month was a segment which featured upcoming singers selected by radio broadcaster Elvis Duran. Nikki Williams was the first singer featured.
- Favorite Things was a segment where Kathie Lee and Hoda share their favorite products.
- Friday Funny was a segment where Kathie Lee shares jokes and puns during the Today's Talk.
- Give It Away was a segment where prizes are given to 5 viewers.
- iHoda was a segment where Hoda shares her favorite song of the moment during Today's Talk.
- iHoda Live, which succeeds the original iHoda, is a segment where Hoda brings in the artist of her favorite song of the moment to perform live. Joshua Radin was the first to perform.
- Who Knew? was a trivia game played with audience members across the street at The Shop at NBC Studios.

== In popular culture ==
During the Kathie Lee & Hoda era, the program was frequently parodied and referenced by other television programs. On Saturday Night Live, Kristen Wiig portrayed Gifford as a disoriented drunk co-host, much to the disapproval of Gifford. People called Kathie Lee & Hoda a comedy writer's dream.

On American Dad!, beginning with the season 12 episode "Morning Mimosa", and again in the season 21 episode "Killer Mimosa", the characters Trish and Suze, who co-host a show titled Morning Mimosa, are a reference to Gifford and Kotb respectively.

On the NBC sitcom Great News, Ana Gasteyer and Rachel Dratch played recurring characters Kelly and Mary-Kelly respectively, who co-host a show titled Morning Wined Up.

== Awards and nominations ==
Year	Award	Category	Nominee(s)	Result	Ref.
2009	Daytime Emmy Awards	Outstanding Original Song – Main Title and Promo	"There's More Today, Everyday"	Nominated	
2019	Daytime Emmy Awards	Outstanding Talk Show Informative	Today with Kathie Lee & Hoda	Nominated	
2019	Daytime Emmy Awards	Outstanding Informative Talk Show Host	Kathie Lee Gifford and Hoda Kotb	Won	
2020	Daytime Emmy Awards	Outstanding Talk Show Informative	Today with Hoda & Jenna	Nominated	
2020	Daytime Emmy Awards	Outstanding Informative Talk Show Host	Hoda Kotb and Jenna Bush Hager	Nominated	
2021	Daytime Emmy Awards	Outstanding Talk Show Entertainment	Today with Hoda & Jenna	Nominated	
2021	Daytime Emmy Awards	Outstanding Entertainment Talk Show Host	Hoda Kotb and Jenna Bush Hager	Nominated	
2022	Daytime Emmy Awards	Outstanding Talk Show Entertainment	Today with Hoda & Jenna	Nominated	
2022	Daytime Emmy Awards	Outstanding Entertainment Talk Show Host	Hoda Kotb and Jenna Bush Hager	Nominated	
2022	People's Choice Awards	The Daytime Talk Show of 2022	Today with Hoda & Jenna	Nominated	
2023	Daytime Emmy Awards	Outstanding Daytime Talk Series	Today with Hoda & Jenna	Nominated	
2024	GLAAD Media Awards	Outstanding Live TV Journalism – Segment or Special	"TikTok Sensations 'The Old Gays' Talk About How They Became Friends and Their New Docuseries"	Nominated	
2025	Daytime Emmy Awards	Outstanding Daytime Talk Series Host	Jenna Bush Hager and Hoda Kotb	Nominated	
2026	Daytime Emmy Awards	Outstanding Daytime Talk Series	Today with Jenna & Friends	Pending	
2026	Daytime Emmy Awards	Outstanding Directing for a Daytime Studio Non-Fiction Series	Today with Jenna & Friends - "Hoda-Bration"	Pending	
