= Jessica George =

Jessica George may refer to:

- Jessica George (politician)
- Jessica George (English writer)
- Jessica Day George, American author
