= A Friend of the Family =

A Friend of the Family may refer to:

- A Friend of the Family (novel), a novel by Lauren Grodstein
- A Friend of the Family (miniseries), an American true crime drama television miniseries
- A Friend of the Family (1957 film), a French comedy film
- A Friend of the Family (2005 film), a Canadian TV film

== See also ==
- Friend of the Family, a 1995 American erotic drama film
