= Beautiful Country (book) =

2021 memoir by Qian Julie Wang

- First edition
- Author: Qian Julie Wang
- Audio read by: Qian Julie Wang
- Language: English
- Subject: Memoir
- Publisher: Doubleday
- Publication date: September 7, 2021
- Publication place: United States
- Media type: Print (hardcover), e-book, audiobook
- Pages: 320
- ISBN: 978-0385547215 (hardcover)

Beautiful Country: A Memoir of an Undocumented Childhood is a 2021 memoir by Chinese American lawyer Qian Julie Wang. It was published on September 7, 2021 by Doubleday, an imprint of Penguin Random House. In The New York Times, reviewer Elisabeth Egan described the book as a "powerful story" that "reminds us how lucky we are to have the privileges unlocked by this little blue booklet [United States passport] — and what others risk and endure every day in hopes of getting one too." The book's title derives from the literal translation of the Chinese word for the United States (Chinese: 美国; pinyin: Měiguó), which means "beautiful country".

== Synopsis ==
In Beautiful Country, Wang writes about the hardships that she and her parents faced upon their arrival to the United States in 1994, as undocumented immigrants from China. She discusses the numerous challenges she faced growing up in poverty, and how she emerged from all of it with her dreams bruised but intact.

== Publication and promotion ==
Wang wrote the book on her phone during her subway commute to her law office, finishing a first draft in 2019.

Beautiful Country was published in hardcover and e-book format on September 7, 2021, by Doubleday, an imprint of Penguin Random House. An audiobook, narrated by Wang, was released the same day. Beautiful Country was also available through the Book of the Month club as one of its selections for the month of September 2021.

Following its publication, Wang promoted her memoir through a series of media appearances, including an interview on NBC's Today Show with Jenna Bush Hager, who had recommended the "impactful" memoir to her "Read with Jenna" book club. Wang also promoted the book on NPR and at the Chicago Humanities Festival.

The book debuted at number three on The New York Times' nonfiction best-seller list.

== Reception ==
Rana Foroohar of the Financial Times wrote that Beautiful Country "shows us how struggle can grind people down, making them as paranoid and cruel to each other as the system is to them." Kaitlin Jefferys of Voice magazine wrote that the memoir leaves readers with a positive message: "cling on to your dreams no matter your circumstances."

In December 2021, former President of the United States Barack Obama included Beautiful Country in his top 13 book recommendations of 2021.
