= Fran Littlewood =

English novelist

- Born: Frances Harriet Littlewood; March 1972 (age 54)
- Education: Royal Holloway, University of London
- Years active: 2021–present
- Children: 3

Frances Harriet Littlewood (born March 1972) is a British novelist and former journalist. She previously wrote for The Times. Her debut novel Amazing Grace Adams (2023) became a New York Times bestseller.

== Early life and education ==
Littlewood is from Surrey. She completed a Master of Arts (MA) at Royal Holloway, University of London.

== Career ==
Littlewood began her career as a finance journalist writing for The Times.

In a two-book deal in May 2021, the imprint Penguin Michael Joseph (PMJ) acquired the rights to publish Littlewood's debut novel Amazing Grace Adams in January 2023. Written during the COVID-19 lockdown and partly inspired by the film Falling Down (1993), Littlewood "wanted to write a midlife heroine. Something that was a corrective to the prevailing narrative that women at this point in their lives are downtrodden and boring and over the hill". The titular character struggles between divorce, perimenopause and more as she strives to deliver her daughter a 16th birthday cake. Amazing Grace Adams became a New York Times bestseller in the hardback fiction category and was a Today Show Read with Jenna pick.

Littlewood's second novel The Favourite (released as The Accidental Favorite in some territories) was published in June 2025. It was reviewed in Kirkus Reviews, Publishers Weekly and Library Journal.

== Adaptation ==
Littlewood's debut novel Amazing Grace Adams is being adapted into a television series.

== Personal life ==
Littlewood lives in North London with her husband, a DJ, and their three daughters.

== Works ==
- Amazing Grace Adams (2023)
- The Favourite (2025) (The Accidental Favorite in some territories)
