= Hoda Kotb =

American journalist and author (born 1964)

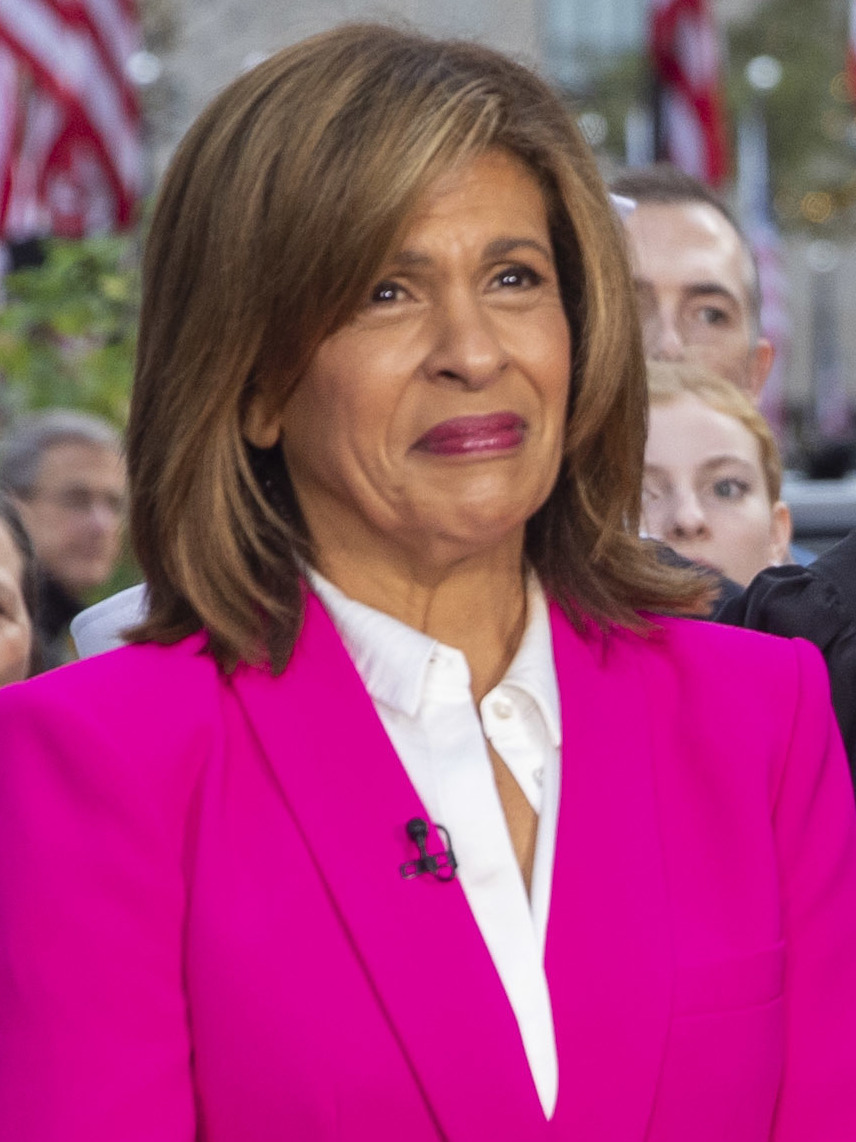
- Kotb in 2022
- Born: August 9, 1964 (age 62); Norman, Oklahoma, U.S.
- Citizenship: United States; Egypt
- Education: Virginia Tech (BA)
- Years active: 1986–present
- Employer: NBC News
- Known for: Co-anchor of the Today show (2018–2025); Co-host of the fourth hour of the Today show (2007–2025); Dateline NBC correspondent (1998–2008); NBC News national correspondent and contributing anchor (1998–present)
- Spouse: Burzis Kanga (m. 2005; div. 2008)
- Partner: Joel Schiffman (2013–2022)
- Children: 2

Hoda Kotb (/ˈhoʊdə ˈkɒtbiː/ HOH-də KOT-bee; (Note: Egyptian Arabic: هدى قطب, romanized: Hudā Quṭb, pronounced [ˈhodæ ˈʔotˤb]) born August 9, 1964) is an American broadcast journalist, television personality, and author. She was the main co-anchor of the NBC News morning show Today from 2018 to 2025, and co-host of its entertainment-focused fourth hour from 2007 to 2025. Kotb also formerly served as a correspondent for the television news magazine program Dateline NBC.

== Early life ==
Kotb was born to Egyptian Muslim parents in Norman, Oklahoma, and grew up in Morgantown, West Virginia, and Alexandria, Virginia. She lived in New Orleans throughout the 1990s. Kotb and her family lived in Egypt for a year, as well as in Nigeria. She has a brother, Adel, and a sister, Hala. Her mother, Sameha ("Sami"), worked at the Library of Congress. Her father, Abdel Kader Kotb (1932–1985) was a fossil energy specialist and was listed in the Who's Who of Technology.

During a 92nd Street Y interview, Kotb hinted at her Muslim roots when she recounted her memories of annual summer vacations in Egypt.

She graduated from Fort Hunt High School in 1982. She was elected homecoming queen and selected to speak at her graduating class's baccalaureate service. In her college years at Virginia Tech, Kotb was a member of Delta Delta Delta women's sorority, Beta Nu Chapter. In 1986, Kotb graduated with a Bachelor of Arts degree in broadcast journalism. Kotb was the keynote speaker at her alma mater for the 2008 Virginia Tech graduation and in her speech, played Metallica's "Enter Sandman" over her iPod. In 2010, Kotb was elected to a three-year term to the Virginia Tech Alumni Association Board of Directors.

== Career ==
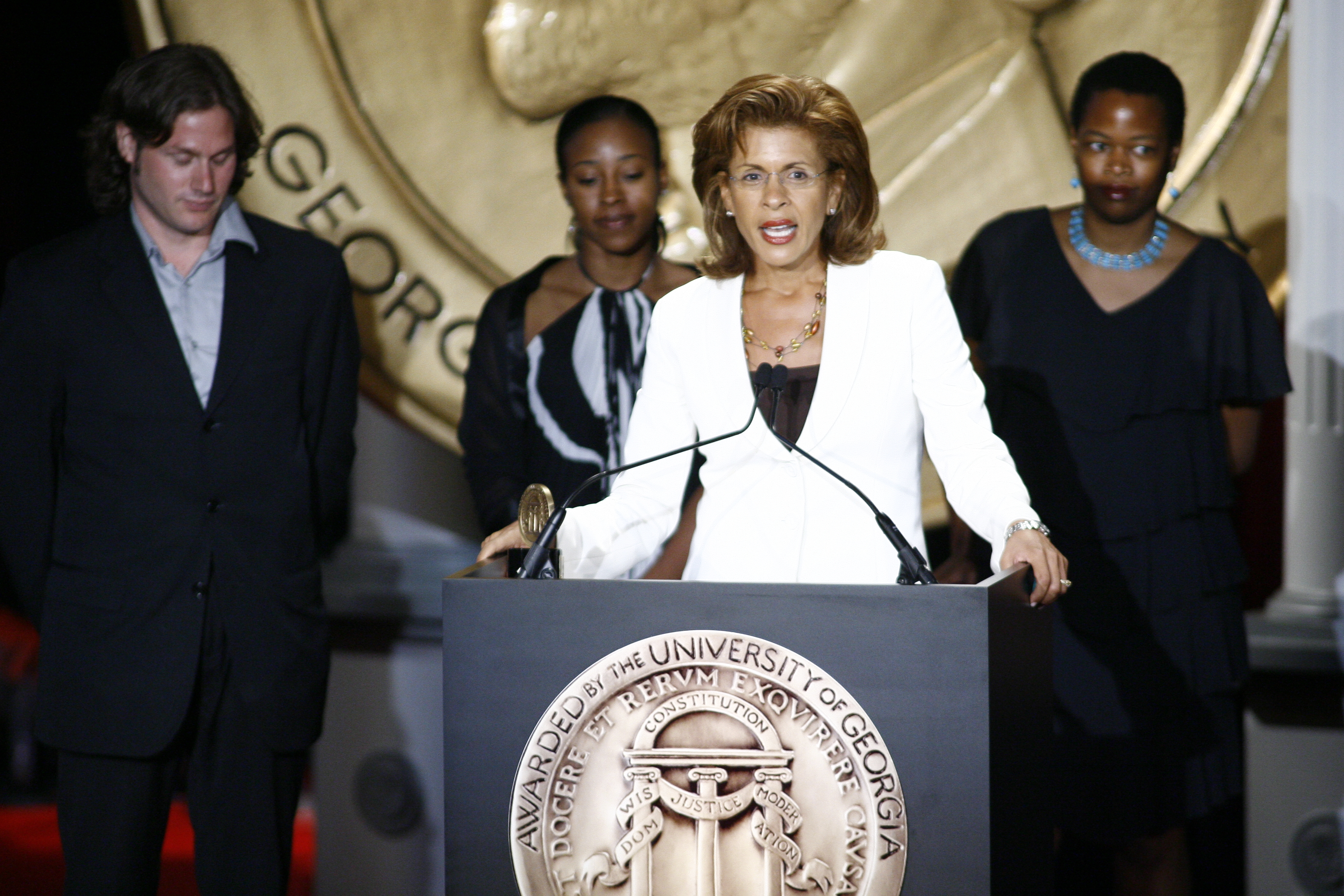
Hoda Kotb, Monica Groves and Shayla Harris accepting the award for "Dateline NBC: The Education of Ms. Groves" at the 66th Annual Peabody Awards Luncheon

Kotb's first on-air job after college was at then-CBS affiliate WXVT in Greenville, Mississippi. Kotb then moved to ABC affiliate WQAD in Moline, Illinois as a reporter from 1988 to 1989. She became a weekend anchor and reporter at CBS affiliate WINK in Fort Myers, Florida from 1989 to 1991. From 1992 to 1998, Kotb was an anchor and reporter for CBS affiliate WWL in New Orleans, Louisiana.

In 2011, Martina McBride asked Kotb to be featured in her music video for "I'm Gonna Love You Through It," a ballad dedicated to cancer survivors.

=== NBC News ===
Kotb officially joined NBC News in April 1998 as a correspondent for Dateline NBC and all NBC News platforms.

She was the first host of Today's first fourth-hour weekday morning broadcast at 10:00 a.m. in September 2007 and was joined by Kathie Lee Gifford as a co-host in April 2008. Gifford was later succeeded by Jenna Bush Hager in April 2019, following Gifford's departure from the show.

On February 23, 2015, Kotb began hosting a live, one-hour show twice a week on SiriusXM's Today channel, discussing casual water cooler topics.

On January 2, 2018, Kotb was named co-anchor of Today with Savannah Guthrie after anchor Matt Lauer was terminated by NBC News following accusations of sexual misconduct. She and Guthrie had been interim co-anchors since Lauer's termination on November 29, 2017. They make up the first female anchor duo to lead the show.

On September 26, 2024, Kotb announced that she would be stepping down from Today in early 2025; she indicated she would continue with NBC in an unspecified role. Her last day was January 10, 2025.

Kotb temporarily returned to Today between February and March 2026 to fill in for Guthrie during her absence in the investigation of the disappearance of her mother.

=== Books ===
In October 2010, Kotb released a New York Times bestselling autobiography, Hoda: How I Survived War Zones, Bad Hair, Cancer, and Kathie Lee.

On January 15, 2013, she released her second book, Ten Years Later: Six People Who Faced Adversity and Transformed Their Lives, in which she chronicles six stories by identifying a life-changing event in each subject's life and then revisiting each of those six people a decade later.

In 2016, Kotb released her third book, Where They Belong: The Best Decisions People Almost Never Made, which features a selection of various stories of inspiring people who "found themselves" in completely unexpected moments or unforeseen circumstances.

In October 2019, Kotb released her sixth book, I Really Needed This Today, which includes personal notes about her experiences and relationships, an assortment of quotes, and 365 sayings that she hopes inspires and uplifts readers. She released a follow-up in October 2020 titled This Just Speaks to Me, which expands on her daily reflections and includes additional personal anecdotes and quotes.

Kotb has also released her own children's books. The first one, her fourth book overall, I've Loved You Since Forever, was released in 2018, and was adapted into a lullaby by Kelly Clarkson. Her second children's book, her fifth book overall, You Are My Happy, which celebrates the things in life that bring gratitude, was released in March 2019.

=== Awards ===
In 2002, Kotb was awarded the Edward R. Murrow Award for her reporting.

Kotb received her first Gracie Awards in 2003 and 2008.

Kotb was awarded a Headliner Award in 2004 for Dateline NBC's "Saving Dane – Adoptees Rage".

In 2006, Kotb was awarded a Peabody Award for Dateline NBC's "The Education of Ms. Groves", which earned her an additional Headliner Award in 2007, as well as the Alfred I. duPont–Columbia University Award in 2008.

In 2010, 2011, and 2012, during which Kotb was a part of the Today morning host lineup, Today won a Daytime Emmy Award for Outstanding Morning Program.

In 2015, she won a Webby Award for Online Film & Video – Public Service & Activism for her music video, "Truly Brave", which she created in collaboration with Sara Bareilles and Cyndi Lauper to raise awareness for pediatric cancer. That same year, she received an additional Gracie Award for Outstanding Host in News/Non-fiction in 2015.

In 2016, Kotb was awarded with a Gracie Award for Outstanding Host in Entertainment/Information for her SiriusXM show.

Kotb was included in Time magazine's 100 Most Influential People of 2018.

In 2019, Kotb and Gifford were awarded a Daytime Emmy Award for Outstanding Informative Talk Show Host during their time as co-hosts.

Kotb was awarded the Matrix Award in October 2021.

== Personal life ==
In 2005, Kotb married University of New Orleans tennis coach Burzis Kanga. The marriage ended in divorce in 2008.

Kotb began a relationship with New York financier Joel Schiffman in 2013. On February 21, 2017, Kotb announced on Today that she had adopted a baby girl named Haley Joy Kotb. On April 16, 2019, Kotb came on Today via phone to announce she had adopted a second baby girl named Hope Catherine Kotb. On November 25, 2019, Kotb announced live on Today that she was engaged to Schiffman. On January 31, 2022, Kotb announced during the fourth hour of Today (Hoda & Jenna) that she and Schiffman had ended their engagement and would focus on co-parenting as friends.

In March 2007, Kotb underwent a mastectomy and reconstructive surgery for breast cancer and has since become an advocate for breast cancer awareness. Kotb allowed Today cameras to follow her throughout her cancer battle. She was declared cancer-free and continued to document and use the story on the show to raise awareness for breast cancer.

== Career timeline ==
- 1986: CBS News – news assistant Cairo, Egypt
- 1986–1989: Morning anchor and general assignment reporter WQAD-TV, ABC Moline, Illinois; and anchor WXVT-TV, CBS Greenville and Greenwood, Mississippi
- 1989–1991: Weekend anchor and reporter WINK-TV, CBS Fort Myers, Florida
- 1992–1998: Anchor and reporter WWL-TV, CBS New Orleans, Louisiana
- 1998–present: NBC News
  - 1998–present: NBC News national correspondent
  - 1998–2008: Dateline NBC contributing anchor and correspondent
  - 2004–2008: Host of the weekly syndicated series Your Total Health
  - 2007–2025: Today 4th hour co-host
    - with Kathie Lee Gifford from April 2008 – April 2019
    - with Jenna Bush Hager from April 2019 – January 2025
  - 2007–2017: Today substitute co-anchor
  - 2017: Today featured co-anchor
  - 2018–2025: Today co-anchor with Savannah Guthrie
  - 2018–present: Macy's Thanksgiving Day Parade host
  - 2021–present: Host, Making Space with Hoda Kotb (NBC News / Today-affiliated podcast)
  - 2026–present: Today substitute co-anchor

=== Other appearances ===
- 2009: Lipstick Jungle as herself (1 episode)
- 2010: 30 Rock as herself (1 episode)
- 2014: Law & Order: Special Victims Unit as herself (2 episodes)
- 2014–2017: Girlfriends' Guide to Divorce as herself (4 episodes)
- 2015: Lip Sync Battle as herself (1 episode)
- 2015: Sharknado 3: Oh Hell No! as herself (movie)
- 2015: Donny! as herself (2 episodes)
- 2016: Younger as herself (1 episode)
- 2016: Brothers Take New Orleans Celebrity judge
- 2017: Nashville as herself (1 episode)
- 2017: Sharknado 5: Global Swarming as herself (movie)
- 2018: Mickey and the Roadster Racers as Miss Sweetums
- 2020: The Not-Too-Late Show with Elmo as herself/guest
- 2021: Valerie's Home Cooking as herself (1 episode)
- 2022: Marry Me as herself (cameo)
- 2022: Girls5eva as herself (1 episode)
- 2024: Curb Your Enthusiasm as herself (1 episode)

=== Other work ===
- 2025–present: Creator of Joy 101, a motivational initiative focused on gratitude, resilience, and everyday well-being, delivered through storytelling, speaking, and personal development content.

== See also ==
- New Yorkers in journalism

== Notes ==
Media offices
Preceded by Matt Lauer	Today Co-Anchor; January 2, 2018 – January 10, 2025; Served alongside: Savannah Guthrie	Succeeded by Craig Melvin
