= Sheinelle Jones =

American journalist, news anchor and correspondent

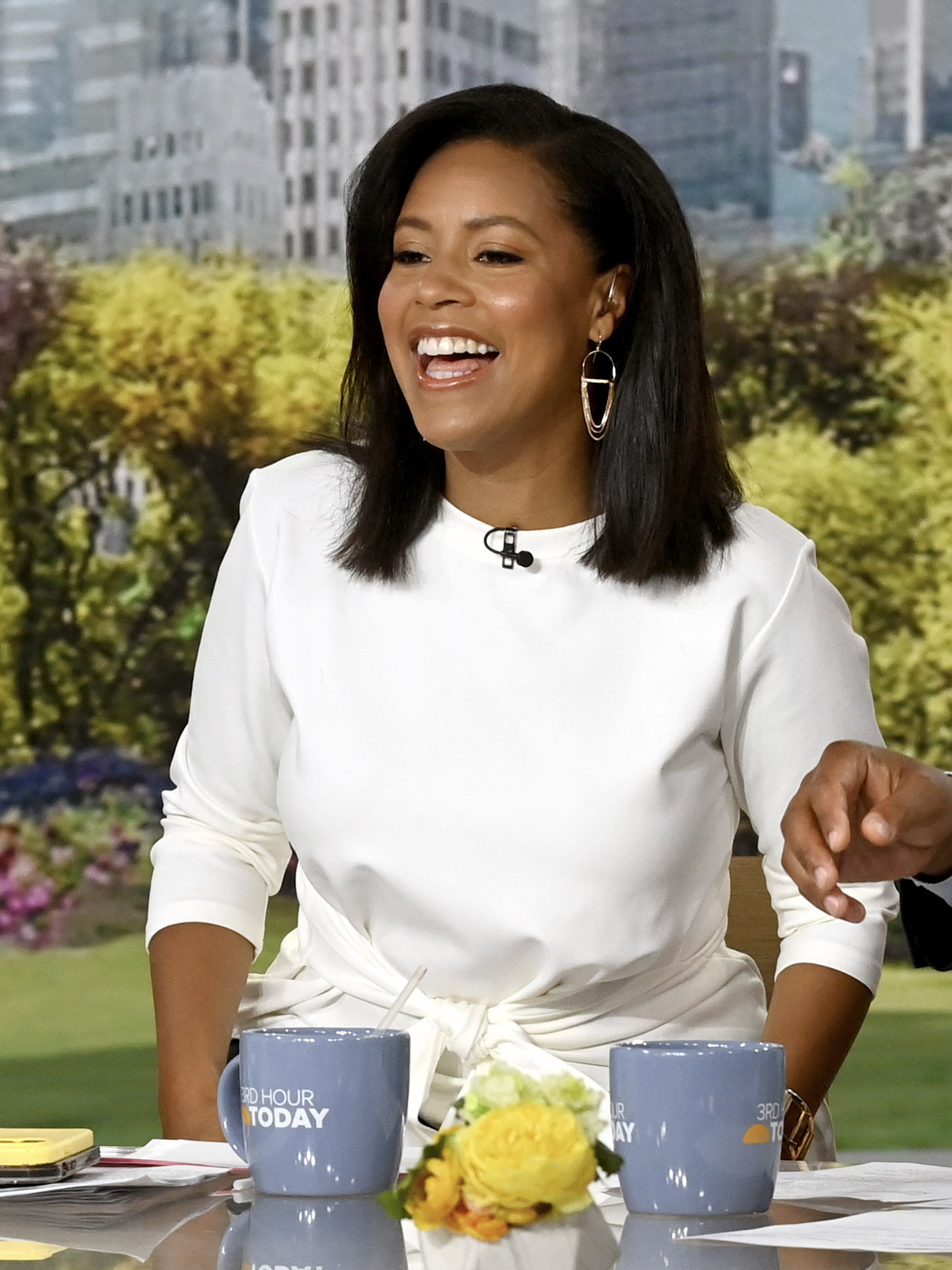
- Jones co-hosting 3rd Hour Today in June 2023
- Born: Sheinelle Marie Jones; April 19, 1978 (age 48); Philadelphia, Pennsylvania, U.S.
- Education: Northwestern University
- Occupations: Journalist; news anchor
- Years active: 2000–present
- Employer: NBC News
- Spouse: Uche Ojeh (m. 2007; died 2025)
- Children: 3
- Father: C. Darnell Jones II

Sheinelle Marie Jones (born April 19, 1978) is an American journalist and a news anchor and correspondent for NBC News. She is the co-host of Today with Jenna & Sheinelle, the fourth hour of Today, and serves as host of Wild Child as part of the network's Saturday morning educational block, The More You Know. Jones was previously a co-host of the third hour of Today, and a former co-anchor of Weekend Today.

== Early life and education ==
Sheinelle Marie Jones was born April 19, 1978, in Philadelphia, Pennsylvania. Her father is U.S. District Court Judge C. Darnell Jones II. She credits her mother with raising her "surrounded by the power of intentionality," by posting inspirational sayings throughout the house. She attended Wichita Brooks Middle Magnet School and Wichita Heights High School, both in Wichita, Kansas, and Northwestern University in Evanston, Illinois, where she pledged the historically Black sorority Alpha Kappa Alpha. While still in high school, she interned at KWCH-TV, the CBS affiliate in Wichita.

== Career ==
Jones' first broadcast job was in Springfield, Illinois, for WICS. Before going to work for NBC News, Jones worked at KOKI-TV, the FOX affiliate in Tulsa, Oklahoma, and WTXF-TV, the FOX O&O in Philadelphia. She was at the Philadelphia station for more than nine years.

Jones joined Today on October 4, 2014, as part of Weekend Today. In January 2019, she became a co-host on 3rd Hour Today. As a co-host on 3rd Hour Today and a co-anchor on the Saturday editions of Weekend Today, Jones was working six days a week. On December 21, 2019, Jones left Weekend Today. In February 2020, Jones had surgery to remove lesions from her vocal cord and thus could not speak at all for two weeks; she remained out of work for six weeks. In 2021, she was the executive producer for a documentary entitled Stories We Tell: The Fertility Secret, which examined the impact of fertility issues on women of color.

On December 9, 2025, Today announced Jones would be stepping away from the 9 a.m. hour of Today to become a permanent co-host of the fourth hour, beginning January 12, 2026. On January 2, 2026, Jones departed 3rd Hour Today.

== Personal life ==
In 2007, Jones married Uche Ojeh, whom she met at Northwestern University, and they have three children, sons Kayin and Uche, and daughter Clara. On May 23, 2025, Today announced that Ojeh had died of aggressive glioblastoma, with Jones having taken family medical leave from NBC News since November 2024 to take care of her husband after his diagnosis in 2023.
