= Heartwood (novel) =

2025 novel by Amity Gaige

- First-edition hardcover
- Author: Amity Gaige
- Language: English
- Genre: Thriller; mystery
- Publisher: Simon & Schuster
- Publication date: April 1, 2025
- Publication place: United States
- Pages: 320
- ISBN: 9781668063606

Heartwood is a thriller novel by American author Amity Gaige. It was published by Simon & Schuster on April 1, 2025. The novel centers the disappearance of a woman named Valerie Gillis. The novel alternates between the perspectives of three characters, with Valerie's chapters being written in the form of letters to her mother. The novel also features transcripts of tip-line messages and interviews with the warden, Lieutenant Beverly "Bev" Miller.

== Background ==
Gaige was inspired to write the novel after learning about Geraldine Largay. She originally did not intend for the novel to be a thriller novel. During her research, Gaige hiked part of the Appalachian Trail. She hiked for four days in New York state and two days in Maine.

== Synopsis ==
In July 2022, forty-two-year-old Valerie Gillis, known on the trail as Sparrow, decides to hike the Appalachian Trail in order to recover from her experience as a nurse during the COVID-19 pandemic. While hiking alone, she receives the logistical support of her husband, Gregory, and on the journey she realizes she does not love him anymore. When she vanishes near the Hundred-Mile Wilderness, a search is led by Lieutenant Beverly "Bev" Miller, a game warden who finds herself alienated from her peers, both for being the first female leader of the Maine Warden Service as well as for being from Massachusetts. She interviews people on the trail, most prominently Ruben "Santo" Serrano, a Dominican-American man from the Bronx who befriended Valerie on the trail. Meanwhile, a seventy-six-year-old disabled woman named Lena Kucharski investigates Valerie's disappearance from her eco-friendly retirement community in Connecticut with an online friend known as /u/TerribleSilence, whom she met on a foraging subreddit.

== Reception ==
The novel was Jenna Bush Hager's April 2025 book club pick. It was nominated for a Goodreads Choice Award for Mystery & Thriller. The audiobook was nominated for an Audie Award for Ensemble Performance.

Ilana Masad of the Portland Press Herald called the novel a "thoroughly enjoyable read", but criticized it for not digging deeper into the political realities it introduces. Kirkus Reviews criticized Santo's linguistic register as feeling "relatively wooden", while calling Bev's chapters "rich and pervasive". Publishers Weekly criticized the plot as "preposterous" and "unfocused", but praised its "multifaceted" characters and "poetic" prose. Ivy Buck called the novel "equal parts gripping and moving" in her review for NPR. Anna Mundow praised Gaige's "restrained" style and "psychological acuity" in her review for The Wall Street Journal. Jackie Thomas-Kennedy of The Minnesota Star Tribune called the novel's ability to introduce and build suspense "astounding". However, Ron Charles of The Washington Post said that the suspense of the novel is "thwarted" by Valerie's "poetic" voice, but described Bev's chapters as "far more convincing" and called the inclusion of Lena and the initial lack of clarity around her inclusion in the novel "genius". Similarly, Michelle Ruiz of The New York Times called Lena "by far the most magnetic" of the three lead characters, and criticizes Valerie for being "less vivid" than Gaige's description of her setting. Sarah Weinman listed it as one of the best mystery novels of 2025 in a New York Times article.
