= Nikki Erlick =

American author

Nikki D. Erlick is an American writer.

Her debut novel The Measure was selected by Jenna Bush Hager for the July 2022 Today Show book club.

== Life ==
She was an intern at Redbook, and staff writer at the Harvard Crimson.

She graduated from Harvard University.

== Works ==
- The Poppy Fields, William Morrow, June 2025. ISBN 0-06-344196-9
- The Measure, William Morrow, May 2022. ISBN 9780063204201
