= Maame (novel) =

2023 novel by Jessica George

- Author: Jessica George
- Language: English
- Genre: Fiction
- Set in: London, England
- Published: 2023
- Publisher: Hodder & Stoughton, St. Martin's Press
- Pages: 320
- ISBN: 978-1-250-28252-1

Maame is a 2023 literary fiction novel written by Jessica George. George's debut novel, was published in 2023 by Hodder & Stoughton and St. Martin's Press.

The novel was named the February 2023 book club pick on The Today Show for Read with Jenna.

== Inspiration ==
George started writing Maame in the summer of 2020. A year later, George was offered a two-book deal by Hodder & Stoughton. Maame is inspired by George's own experiences caring for her father with Parkinson's.

== Title ==
"Maame" has multiple meanings in Twi. Meanings include "woman", "mother", and "the responsible one".

== Synopsis ==
Maddie Wright, a 25-year-old woman in London, struggles to balance her life as caretaker of her critically ill father, her mother's verbal tirades and a challenging career in the publishing industry. When her mother returns from a trip to Ghana, Maddie moves out on her own for the first time.

While she experiences guilt, Maddie moves into an apartment with flatmates Jo and Cam. She meets an older man named Ben who she starts to date and ultimately loses her virginity to. She gets a new job at a fictional publishing agency.

After a night of partying with Jo and Cam, Maddie wakes up hungover the next day to find out her father has died on his birthday. Devastated, Maddie takes off time from her new job and cancels her trip to Italy in order to grieve. She accompanies Ben to a work party, where she finds out that he is also dating another woman, and they break up.

Maddie and her mother and brother argue over how to cover funeral costs. Maddie, being very frugal, has the most money saved up and is expected to front most of the bill. She begins experiencing panic attacks for the first time. Meanwhile, Maddie begins to try out online dating and meets a bisexual man named Alex.

Maddie starts seeing a therapist at work. Alex and Maddie break up after a few dates. After her father's funeral, Maddie starts trying to practice her Twi and forgives her mother for not being more involved in her life. At the reading of her father's will, Maddie finds out he left all his money to her. Maddie begins talking to Sam, who was previously in a brief relationship with her soon-to-be-ex roommate Jo. In the epilogue, Maddie visits her father's grave and updates him on her new life.

== Television adaptation ==
Universal International Studios and Thousand Voices by Jenna Bush Hager are developing a television adaptation of Maame. George and writer Yemi Oyefuwa will collaborate on the screen adaptation.
