= Ana's Story =

Book by Jenna Bush Hager

- Author: Jenna Bush
- Illustrator: Mia Baxter
- Publisher: HarperCollins
- Publication date: September 28, 2007
- Media type: Hardcover
- Pages: 304
- ISBN: 978-0-06-137908-6
- OCLC: 149005146

Ana's Story: A Journey of Hope is a non-fiction book, by Jenna Bush, daughter of U.S. President George W. Bush. Ana's Story is the account of a 17-year-old mother who was born with HIV. Bush met Ana, identified only by her first name, while an intern for UNICEF in Latin America. Because of discrimination against AIDS victims, some names and details in the story were altered to protect the subjects.

== Contents ==
The book tells the story of Ana whose first memory is of learning that her baby sister has died. Ana's parents die of AIDS as well, and Ana is raised by an abusive grandmother whose boyfriend molested her. Ana learns at age 10 that she has HIV, but is told that it must be kept secret. By 17, Ana has a child of her own (HIV-negative) and is struggling to survive.

The book consists of 102 chapters, some as short as a few sentences, and includes 49 pictures from Mia Baxter. The book also consists of 35 pages of information about UNICEF and AIDS-prevention.

== Promotional tour ==
To promote the large printing, HarperCollins arranged a 25-city book tour for Bush. Bush also gave interviews to 20/20 with Diane Sawyer, The Washington Post and People Magazine. At Bush's first bookstore appearance in Annapolis, Maryland, a line formed at 9 a.m. for a 2 p.m. book signing. Bush has said that her share of the proceeds will be donated to UNICEF.

== Bush and UN programs ==
Some critics have noted that Jenna Bush's father, President George W. Bush has had a relationship with the United Nations that many consider combative and criticized Jenna for not taking a stand on this issue. An example is that the Bush administration declined to fund the United Nations Population Fund (UNFPA) which funds various HIV prevention programs on the grounds that the UNFPA has funded coercive abortions in China. Although the State Department disputed the allegation, the administration in fact has withheld $195 million in funds to the organization. Bush has generally declined to discuss her father's politics, though she did say "I'm not my dad," and "I can tell you that UNICEF is doing incredible work." One critic has noted that such statements could be considered "visiting the sins of the father on the daughter."
