= Lisa Harding =

Irish writer, actress and playwright

- Born: Dublin, Ireland
- Education: Trinity College Dublin
- Occupations: Writer, actress, playwright
- Writing career
- Years active: 2012–present
- Period: Contemporary
- Genres: Novel, Play
- Subjects: Family; Love; Motherhood
- Notable work: Harvesting (2017) Bright Burning Things (2021)
- Notable awards: Kate O'Brien Award; Irish Book Awards

Lisa Harding is an Irish writer, actress, and playwright whose work includes novels, theatre, anthologies and journals. She is considered an important voice in contemporary Irish literature, with her works contributing to discussions around social issues. Her novels engage readers with compelling stories while prompting reflection on the lives of those on the margins of society.

== Early life and education ==
Harding was raised in Dublin, Ireland, where she initially pursued a career in acting before focusing on writing. She completed an MPhil in creative writing from Trinity College Dublin in 2014, marking the beginning of her transition from acting to writing.

== Career ==
=== Acting ===
Before embarking on a writing career, Harding was an accomplished actress, appearing in various theatrical productions, television shows, and films in Ireland and the UK. Her acting background has influenced her writing, evident in her vivid characterizations and deep understanding of human emotions and motivations.

=== Writing career ===
Harding's literary debut came with the novel Harvesting in 2017, which received critical acclaim for its exploration of human trafficking and forced prostitution. The novel follows the lives of two young girls, one Irish and the other Moldovan, offering an emotional look at their exploitation. "Harvesting" won the 2018 Kate O'Brien Award and was shortlisted for an Irish Book Award and the Kerry Group Irish Novel of the Year.

Her second novel, Bright Burning Things, published in 2021, addresses themes of addiction, motherhood, and redemption. The story is told through Sonya, a struggling actress battling alcoholism and the challenges of raising her son. Critics praised the book for its raw portrayal of addiction and its impact on family dynamics.

Harding's work is characterized by its emotional depth, complex characters, and exploration of difficult subjects such as addiction, exploitation, and redemption. Her background in acting contributes to her vivid portrayals and intense narrative voice.

== Awards and recognition ==
Year	Publication	Award	Result	Ref
2018	Harvesting	Irish Book Awards	Shortlisted	
2018	Harvesting	Kate O'Brien Award	Won	
2018	Harvesting	Kerry Group Irish Novel of the Year	Shortlisted	

== Biblio ==
- Harvesting (2017)
- Bright Burning Things (2021)
- The Wildelings (2025)
