= Bright Burning Things =

Novel by Lisa Harding

Bright Burning Things is a novel by Lisa Harding about a former Actor whose lavish life comes to an end with single motherhood and with an addiction to alcohol. Bright Burning Things was published by Bloomsbury in the United Kingdom. Film director Michael Lennox is reported to be creating a film based on the novel.

== Plot ==
The story opens up with Sonya, a failed mother and failed actress, living in Dublin with her 4-year-old son Tommy, and a dog, Herbie. Her father, who she does not have a good relationship with, intervenes by sending her to rehab for 3 months. When she moves to rehab, Tommy and Herbie are looked after by her father without any promise of them being returned after she completes the program. Sonya struggles in rehab as she is not able to take it seriously. She finds it difficult to connect with the others in the rehab, and it becomes difficult for her to discover who she really is.

== Reviews ==
The Guardian wrote about the book "Written with great energy and generosity, Bright Burning Things is the raw and emotional story of a woman’s search for self-knowledge; one that grips from the beginning." The Washington Post wrote, "A novel that gives authentic voice to a modern woman’s alcoholism".
