= A Friend of the Family (novel) =

2009 novel by Lauren Grodstein

- Author: Lauren Grodstein
- Language: English
- Genre: Family saga, Domestic Drama, Psychological fiction
- Published: November 10, 2009 (hardcover), November 9, 2010 (paperback)
- Publisher: Algonquin Books of Chapel Hill
- Publication place: United States
- Media type: Print (Paperback, Hardcover), E-book
- Pages: Paperback: 320, Hardcover: 304, E-book: 336
- ISBN: 978-1-61620-017-6

A Friend of the Family is a novel by Lauren Grodstein which takes place in the modern day suburbia of Northern New Jersey where the main character, Pete Dizinoff, a skilled internist, lives in a large house with his wife Elaine and son Alec. Pete's life begins to crumble when his best friend's daughter, Laura Stern, comes back into town years after a shocking crime and becomes involved with Pete's son, threatening Pete's plans for Alec.

== Plot synopsis ==
The main events of the novel occur between the years of 1993–2007, from Laura's neonaticide through Alec packing up and leaving his family. Lauren Grodstein utilizes flashbacks to exploit how the narrator, successful New Jersey internist Pete Dizinoff, ends up where he is today: estranged from his best friends, the Sterns, his son, Alec, and his patients, as well as on the verge of divorce with his wife, Elaine. Pete's need for control over his son's life eventually drives Alec away from him, and away from the bright future Pete had pushed him towards. This trait also sets up the violent conclusion with Laura. Pete's God complex severely affects his professional life when he ignores Joe's advice about his patient Roseanne and fails to diagnose her with Addison's disease, a condition which eventually kills her.

== Major characters ==
Pete Dizinoff is a New Jersey suburbanite, internist, and protagonist of the story. He is an unreliable narrator because of his narrow-mindedness; Pete judges everyone. He had a malpractice case against him because he had a patient die under his medical care. He was accused of raping Laura Stern at her apartment. Pete has a psychological issue with his son, Alec, getting involved with Laura Stern, who allegedly killed her baby. Pete is worried that Alec is throwing his life away. Alec is only 20 years old, while Laura is 31. He goes through problems that most doctors go through, like the malpractice case. Those problems can psychologically wear you down.

Elaine Dizinoff met Pete in college through Iris, a mutual friend and sorority sister. She earned a PhD in English literature. She and Pete had trouble having a child. Elaine survived a bout with breast cancer.

Alec Dizinoff was born July 4, 1985, in Round Hill, and he is an only child. He dropped out of Hampshire College after three semesters but was then given an art studio above the garage. Alec got in trouble as a teen (stealing, alcohol, drugs) quite a few times. Alec loves Laura, but Pete doesn't approve of the relationship. Alec does not get along with his father.

Laura Stern is Joe and Iris's oldest child. Laura didn't have any friends growing up; she was a victim of bullying. Laura was called names, like "Yeti" and "Fire Crotch" and described as "dirty"; kids in her school created and signed a hate petition about her. Laura hung around the Grand Union and had sex with the boys by the back dumpster, and she became pregnant and distanced herself from everyone.

Joe Stern was Pete's best friend. He married Iris and has four children with her. Joe is an obstetrician, and he favors Laura out of all of his four children. He lives in Round Hill with Pete and holds a secret that is the deciding factor in Pete's case.

Iris Stern She is a longtime friend of Pete. Pete is romantically interested in her, like he was back in college. She married Joe and has four children with him. She doesn't always like Laura, unlike Joe.

Roseanne Craig is 22 years old and one of Pete's patients. Roseanne died while under Pete's medical care. Pete had thought she had depression but that was a misdiagnoses; she actually had Addison's Disease. She got injured on a canoeing trip with her friends, and she died from her injury because of an Addisonian Crisis.

== Setting ==
A Friend of the Family takes place in a nice house in an affluent New Jersey suburb in Bergen County, the most populous county in New Jersey and the twenty-fifth wealthiest county in the country. Bergen County has a significant Jewish-American population. In addition, Pete Dizinoff's flashbacks and flashbacks of flashbacks take the story to other places, including Yonkers, New York; Pittsburgh, Pennsylvania; and Delaware.

== Further information ==
A Friend of the Family incorporates the genres of psychological literature and domestic drama. Psychological literature is literature in which the thoughts, feelings, and motivations of the character are of equal or greater interest than the actions of the character. Domestic Drama, is a drama that includes a middle to lower class protagonist.

=== Real life neonaticides ===
Grodstein's inspirations and influences for A Friend of the Family stemmed from the 1990s cases of Amy Grossberg and Melissa Drexler, two high school girls both well known for taking the life of their newborn babies shortly after they had given birth. Drexler gave birth at her senior prom and Grossberg delivered a baby in a hotel room with the help of her boyfriend, then disposed of it. This situation was the start for her ideas in the main storyline as well as one of her main characters, Laura Stern. Laura Stern was based on both Melissa Drexler and Amy Grossberg. Grodstein's intentions however, were not to make her audience feel like the actions of young women who commit these neonaticides were wrong nor right but to make her readers understand a different side to the "murders" not just the death of a baby but everything behind that, everything that started such a plan to get rid of a life. Grodstein wanted people to feel what it felt like in their positions, how they felt when they first discovered they were pregnant, and/or how they felt after they delivered.

== Reception ==
Reviews were generally positive, with some reservations. Critics found the book's flashback-heavy structure occasionally confusing and some plot events were criticized as "not quite plausible." However, Grodstein was praised for capturing "the anxiety of a father's love" and "ever-striving angst of parents" in Pete and the character of an upper-middle-class kid in Alec, and in general critics admired Grodstein's skill as a storyteller.

Besides a few negative comments, the rest of the book was adored by most readers. Patty Rhule writes, "A Friend of the Family beautifully captures parents who will take any step to ensure their children's lives are easier or better". Some reviewers believed that the novel would be a good piece for a book club, because it would spark good discussion. Swapna Krishna says that the large numbers of problems going on in the novel would be interesting to talk about in a group. Grodstein's writing was complimented by Joanna Rakoff stating, "she is a terrific storyteller and an even better ventriloquist".

== Publishing information ==
A Friend of the Family was published by Algonquin Books in November 2009. The following November, the paperback was printed. A Friend of the Family, as well as Grodstein's other work, has been translated into German, Italian, French, Turkish, and other languages.
