= Craig Melvin =

American television journalist (born 1979)

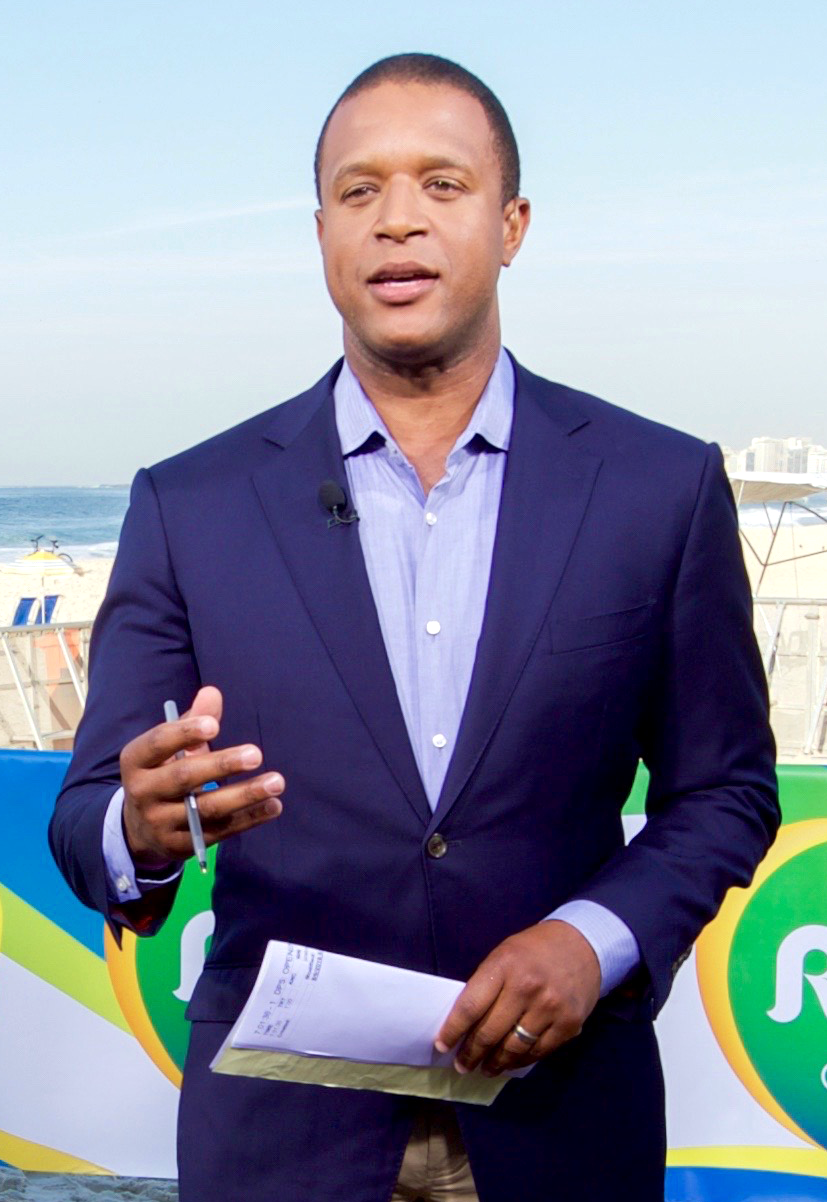
- Melvin in 2016
- Born: Craig Delano Melvin; May 20, 1979 (age 47); Columbia, South Carolina, U.S.
- Education: Wofford College (BA)
- Occupation: Journalist
- Years active: 1995–present
- Known for: NBC News anchor and reporter
- Spouse: Lindsay Czarniak (m. 2011)
- Children: 2

Craig Delano Melvin (born May 20, 1979) is an American broadcast journalist and anchor at NBC News. From August 2018 until January 2025, he was a news anchor on NBC's Today, in October 2018, a co-host of Today Third Hour before being made permanent host in January 2019, and in January 2025, he became a co-anchor for the first and second hours of Today. Melvin also serves as a fill-in & substitute anchor for the NBC Nightly News.

== Early life ==
Craig Delano Melvin was born on May 20, 1979, in Columbia, South Carolina, to Lawrence and Betty Melvin. He has a younger brother, Ryan Melvin, and an older half-brother, Rev. Lawrence Meadows, who died of colon cancer on December 9, 2020 at the age of 43.

In 1996, he was elected as the first African-American president of Key Club International. In 2001, he received a Bachelor of Arts degree in government from Wofford College. He is a member of Kappa Sigma fraternity and also served as a senior counselor for South Carolina's Palmetto Boys State program.

== Career ==
Melvin first joined NBC-affiliate WIS-TV in Columbia, South Carolina as a high school student, working as an "Our Generation Reporter" from 1995 to 1997.

After college, he returned to WIS in July 2001 as a news photographer and producer, before becoming a reporter for the station's morning news team, producing his "Craig Cam" live segments. He was later promoted to news anchor for the weekend morning newscast and the weekend evening newscasts before heading the weekday newscasts. At WIS-TV, Melvin also created several series that covered issues affecting education and the homeless in Columbia, among others.

In July 2008, Melvin left WIS-TV to join NBC's owned-and-operated station in Washington, D.C., WRC-TV, where he anchored the weekend evening newscasts.

Three years later, in July 2011, Melvin departed WRC-TV for MSNBC to become a daytime anchor, while also contributing to NBC News as a reporter. In 2012, Melvin anchored MSNBC's coverage of the national conventions for the Republican and Democratic parties, as well as TV One's Election Night coverage, in partnership with NBC News. He also covered the Sandy Hook shootings in December 2012. In 2013, he covered the Moore tornado in May, as well as the crash of Asiana Airlines Flight 214 and the George Zimmerman trial in July. In 2014, Melvin covered the shooting of Michael Brown in August and the murder of Hannah Graham in September. In 2015, he covered the Charleston church shooting as well as the death of Freddie Gray in June. In 2016, Melvin covered the mass shooting of Dallas police officers in July and was also among the NBC reporters covering the Summer Olympics in Rio de Janeiro in August. That same year, he also succeeded José Díaz-Balart as an anchor of MSNBC Live, which would become MSNBC Reports.

In 2017, Melvin hosted his own true crime series Dateline: Secrets Uncovered. It premiered on Oxygen in July 21.

In 2018, Melvin reported from Pyeongchang County for NBC's coverage of the Winter Olympics in February. He was also promoted to weekday news anchor on Today in September and formed the cast of hosts heading Today Third Hour in October.

In December 2020, Melvin co-hosted NBC's annual broadcast of the lighting of the Rockefeller Center Christmas Tree.

In March 2022, Melvin announced he would be leaving his hour of MSNBC Reports to focus on Today.

On January 13, 2025, Melvin stepped into the co-anchor chair alongside Savannah Guthrie and replaced Hoda Kotb, who left the program the week before.

Melvin was slated to host the 2026 Milan-Cortina Winter Olympics, beginning in Milan on February 6, 2026. However, due to the disappearance of Savannah Guthrie's mother, Nancy Guthrie (which occurred on January 31, 2026), Melvin decided to withdraw from Olympics coverage and remain in New York City. Ahmed Fareed replaced Melvin as host as a result.

On July 16, 2026, in an unauthorized area near the studio of Today, a man went up to Melvin and shouted a racial slur at him. Melvin was not injured and the man was arrested. Later that day, Melvin said in a statement that he was "doing just fine."

== Personal life ==
Melvin married then-ESPN sports anchor and former WRC-TV sports reporter Lindsay Czarniak on October 15, 2011. They reside in Connecticut and have a son, Delano (“Del”), who was born in March 2014, and a daughter, Sybil (“Sibby”), who was born in November 2016. Melvin is a Christian and attends a congregational church.

== Career timeline ==
- 2001–2008: WIS-TV anchor and reporter, Columbia, S.C.
- 2008–2011: WRC-TV 6 PM and 11 PM weekend news anchor, Washington, D.C.
- 2011–present: NBC News/MSNBC
  - 2011–2014: MSNBC Live weekend anchor
  - 2012–present: NBC News correspondent
  - 2015–2018: Weekend Today co-anchor
  - 2016–2022: MSNBC Live anchor
  - 2016–present: Dateline Extra Anchor
  - 2017: Sunday Night with Megyn Kelly correspondent
  - 2018–2025: Today news anchor
  - 2018–present: Today Third Hour host
  - 2025–present: Today co-anchor with Savannah Guthrie

== Awards ==
In 1996, Melvin received an Associated Press award for his story on innovative teaching, making him one of the youngest recipients to ever receive such an award.

In 2003 and 2005, Melvin shared in the Emmy Awards won by WIS-TV for having the best newscast.

In 2006, Melvin received an Emmy Award for his work as news anchor.

In 2007, he was named "Best Anchor" by the South Carolina Broadcaster's Association.

Media offices
Preceded by Hoda Kotb	Today Co-Anchor; January 13, 2025 – present Served alongside: Savannah Guthrie	Succeeded by Incumbent
