= Florence Knapp (author) =

British author

- Born: March 1977 (age 49)
- Education: University of Southampton
- Years active: 2012–present
- Website: www.florenceknapp.com

Florence Knapp (born March 1977) is an English author and blogger. Her debut novel The Names (2025) won a British Book Award among other accolades.

== Early life ==
Originally from the North West of England, Knapp spent some of her childhood in Australia from age 6. Knapp graduated with a degree in Sociology from the University of Southampton.

== Career ==
Having honed her skills when her children were younger, Knapp first gained prominence through her sewing and quilting blog Flossie Teacakes. Knapp's debut non-fiction book Flossie Teacakes' Guide to English Paper Piecing was published in 2018. In addition, she contributed to the V&A book Patchwork & Quilting: A Maker's Guide, and her short story "Blue Suede Shoes" received the Bath Short Story Award's Acorn Award for Unpublished Writer of Fiction.

In 2023, Phoenix (an Orion Publishing Group imprint) acquired the rights to publish Knapp's debut fiction novel The Names in 2025. The Names was Orion's bestselling book of 2025.

== Personal life ==
Knapp lives in Kent with her husband Ian. They have two children.

== Bibliography ==
=== Novels ===
- The Names (2025)

=== Non-fiction ===
- Flossie Teacakes' Guide to English Paper Piecing (2018)

=== Other ===
- Contributions to Patchwork & Quilting: A Maker's Guide (2018)
- "Blue Suede Shoes", short story

== Accolades ==
Year	Award	Category	Title	Result	Ref.
2018	Bath Short Story Award	Acorn Award for Unpublished Writer of Fiction	"Blue Suede Shoes"	Won	
2025	Goodreads Choice Awards	Fiction	The Names	Shortlisted	
2025	Goodreads Choice Awards	Debut Novel	The Names	Runner-up	
2026	British Book Awards	Debut Book of the Year	The Names	Won	
2026	Dublin Literary Award		The Names	Nominated	
2026	Indie Book Awards	Fiction	The Names	Won	
