= Jessica George (English writer) =

English novelist and editor

- Born: 1990s
- Education: University of Sheffield
- Years active: 2020–present

Jessica B. George is an English novelist and editor. Her debut novel Maame (2023) became a New York Times best seller and received a number of accolades, including an Alex Award and a Diverse Book Award.

== Early life ==
George was born to Ghanaian parents. She began her studies in International Business at Brunel University London. Realising she lacked interest in the subject, she transferred to the English literature course at the University of Sheffield.

== Career ==
George began her career working in publishing and editing as an assistant at Bloomsbury UK. She first attempted to write novels in the superhero and mystery genres. Upon losing her father to Parkinson's disease-related complications in 2020, George started writing diary entries to process her grief. This became the basis for her debut novel.

Via an eight-way auction in spring 2021, Hodder & Stoughton acquired the rights to publish George's debut novel Maame in 2023. The U.S. publishing rights went to St Martin's Press. The novel follows 25-year-old Maddie, who is the primary carer for her ill father and has a delayed coming-of-age experience. A Read with Jenna book club pick, the novel debuted at #5 on the New York Times best seller list in the Hardcover Fiction category and also became a Publishers Weekly bestseller. Maame won an Alex Award and the Diverse Book Award for Best Adult Book. It was also shortlisted for TikTok Book of the Year and two Goodreads Choice Awards.

Also in 2023, George established the Jessica George bursary for underrepresented writers with Jericho Writers.

== Adaptation ==
In January 2023, Universal International Studios optioned Maame for television. George is attached to co-write the adaptation with Yemi Oyefuwa.

== Personal life ==
As of 2023, George lives in Wandsworth, London.

== Bibliography ==
- Maame (2023)
- Love by the Book (2026)

== Accolades ==
Year	Award	Category	Title	Result	Ref.
2023	TikTok Book Awards	Book of the Year	Maame	Shortlisted	
2023	Goodreads Choice Awards	Best Debut Novel	Maame	Shortlisted	
2023	Goodreads Choice Awards	Best Fiction	Maame	Shortlisted	
2024	Alex Awards		Maame	Won	
2024	Diverse Book Awards	Best Adult Book	Maame	Won	
