= Tara Conklin =

American author

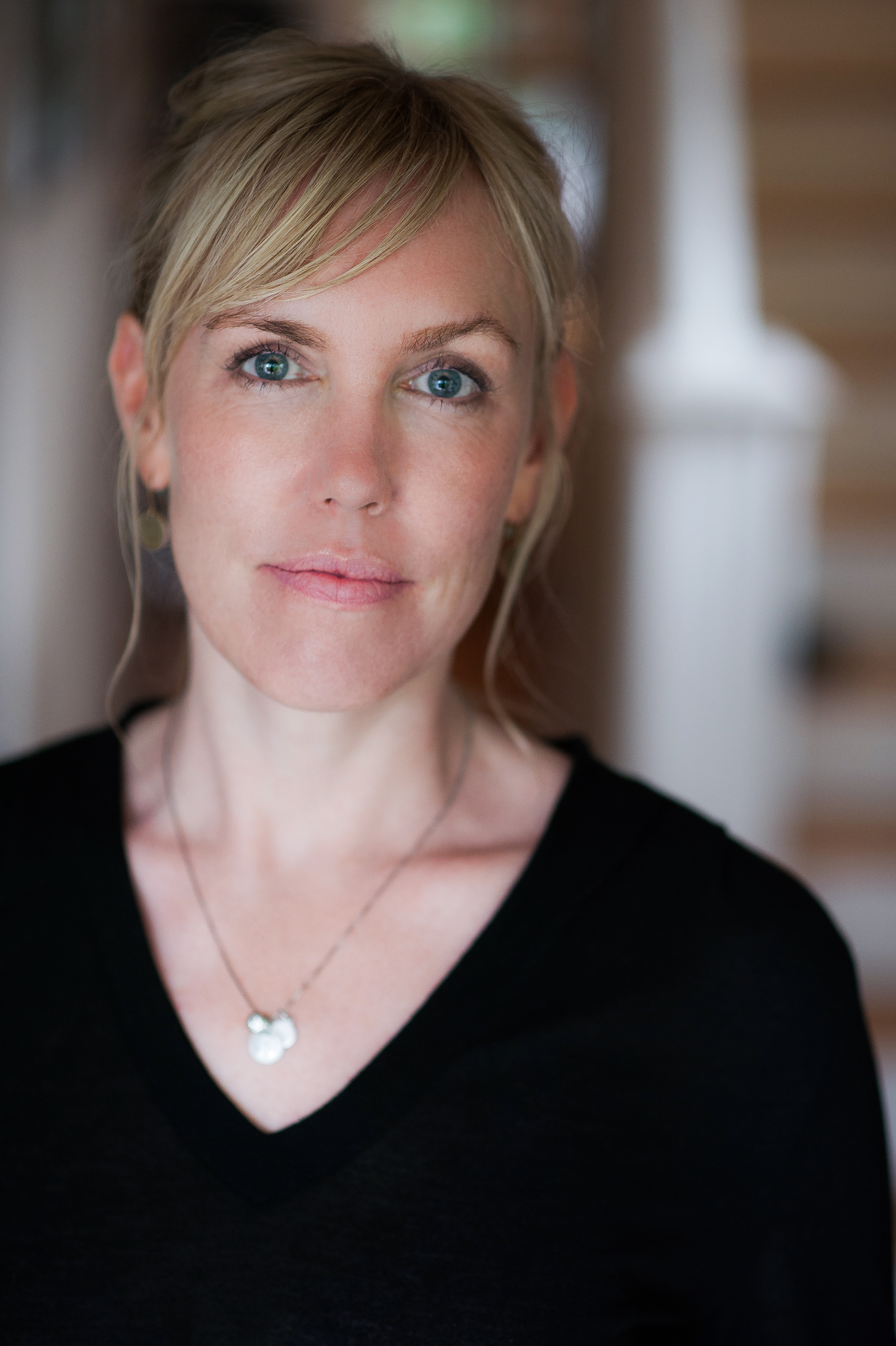
Conklin in 2018

Tara Conklin (born 1971) is a New York Times bestselling American author.

She is a writing coach at The Novelry.

== Biography ==
Conklin, who was born in 1971 in St. Croix, United States Virgin Islands, was raised in Stockbridge, Massachusetts. As a child, she was an avid reader and enjoyed Bridge to Terabithia and The War of the Worlds. Conklin earned her bachelor of arts degree from Yale University, a Master in Law and Diplomacy from the Fletcher School, Tufts University, and a JD from New York University School of Law.

Conklin lives in Seattle, Washington.

=== Career ===
Conklin began writing seriously while still a practicing lawyer. She published short fiction in the collection Pangea: An Anthology of Stories from Around the Globe and the Bristol Prize Anthology and was shortlisted for the Bridport Prize and the Bristol Short Story Prize. In addition, she has published personal essays in Vogue, the Berkshire Eagle, the anthologies This is the Place: Women Writing about Home and Wanting: Women Writing about Desire.

==== The House Girl (2013) ====
Her debut novel, The House Girl, Was a #1 IndieNext pick, an Apple Books bestseller, an iBooks bestseller, and a New York Times bestseller.

Jane Henriksen Baird wrote in a starred review for Library Journal, "...the author slowly builds a suspenseful and dramatic revelation of their deep connection across the decades. Conklin's debut is a seamless juxtaposition of past and present, of the lives of two women, and of the redemptive nature of art and the search for truth and justice. Guaranteed to keep readers up long past their bedtimes". Booklist had a favorable assessment: "Stretching back and forth across time and geography, this riveting tale is bolstered by some powerful universal truths".

==== The Last Romantics (2018) ====
The Last Romantics was Publishers Weekly bestseller and an instant New York Times bestseller. Jenna Bush Hager selected The Last Romantics as the first-ever book for the #ReadwithJenna program on The Today Show.

Melissa Norstedt of Booklist wrote, "Despite spanning almost a century, The Last Romantics never feels rushed. Conklin places readers in the center of the Skinner family, moving back and forth in time and allowing waves of emotion to slowly uncurl. Perfectly paced, affecting fiction". Moira Macdonald of The Seattle Times wrote that The Last Romantics is "a book that beautifully understands its characters". Publishers Weekly said, "The accomplished second novel... throws a few unexpected twists into the well-worn story of evolving relationships among siblings".

==== Community Board (2023) ====
Publishers Weekly called Community Board "quirky but undercooked". Jane Harper of Booklist said Conklin "delivers a winning third novel". Kirkus Reviews wrote favorably of the novel: "Conklin has created a heartening look at a community whose people realize they're better together than alone".

== Selected works ==
- The House Girl. Morrow, 2013.
- The Last Romantics. Morrow, 2018.
- Community Board. Mariner, 2023.
