= The Names (Knapp novel) =

2025 book

- Authors: Florence Knapp
- Language: English
- Publication date: 2025
- Pages: 328

The Names is a 2025 novel by Florence Knapp, her debut. It was first published by Phoenix Books in the United Kingdom and Pamela Dorman in the United States in May.

== Summary ==
The novel begins in late 1987, where a woman named Cora is trapped in an abusive marriage and has just given birth to a baby boy as the great storm of 1987 rages. Cora faces the dilemma of what to name her son: either Gordon, the name her abusive husband prefers (and her husband's own name), or Bear, the name suggested by Cora's daughter (who thinks the name is the type of name someone kind and brave would have), or Julian ("sky father"), the name Cora prefers. The novel then follows Cora's son over the next 35 years, across the three different timelines he would live depending on which name was chosen.

== Themes ==
In an interview with Goldsboro Books, Knapp stated that "I’ve always been fascinated by the things that shape us as people and a name, which we’re given at birth and then carry out into the world with us, seems like it has the potential to have a profound impact on that. Either because of the associations we bring to it ourselves, or through those drawn by others," adding that "although I find the traditional meanings of names interesting, I’m more fascinated by the subconscious associations we bring to them, and how these might influence us."

== Critical reception ==
Rebecca Laurence and Lindsay Baker of the BBC named the book as one of their top 25 books of 2025.

Ellen Peirson-Hagger of The Observer wrote that the novel "may well be the most devastating book you read this year," praising it as a "wildly original and emotionally profound novel." Elizabeth Hand of The Washington Post reviewed the novel as "dazzling," calling it "a profound, deeply compassionate examination of domestic abuse." Kirkus Reviews wrote that the novel was "a noteworthy debut explores a sobering topic with creativity, cleverness, and care." Clare Clark of The Guardian described the novel as "strikingly assured... a compelling and original debut, a book that asks at least as many questions as it answers." Laura Hackett of The Times praised the novel as "an unadulterated success: moving, evocative and utterly convincing... It’s one of those books that will make you irritable with anyone who interrupts you, but which you’ll finish wanting to press into the hands of a friend." Publishers Weekly gave the novel a starred review, describing it as "intriguing and nuanced... Readers won’t be able to stop talking about this intelligent exploration of a single choice’s long tail of repercussions.
