= Qian Julie Wang =

Chinese-American writer and civil-rights lawyer

- Born: Qian Wang; July 24, 1987 (age 39); Shijiazhuang, Hebei, China
- Education: Swarthmore College (BA); Yale University (JD)
- Occupations: Writer; civil rights lawyer
- Spouse: Marc Ari Gottlieb (m. 2019)
- Children: 1 (daughter)

Qian Julie Wang
- Simplified Chinese: 王乾
Transcriptions
Standard Mandarin
- Hanyu Pinyin: Wáng Qián

Qian Julie Wang (Chinese: 王乾) is a Chinese-American writer and civil rights lawyer.

== Early life ==
Qian Wang was born in Shijiazhuang, China to academic parents. Wang's mother was a professor of mathematics, while Wang's father was a professor of English and critic of the government, which led to the family being persecuted. Wang's father fled China to the United States when she was five; Wang and her mother followed two years later in 1994. After their temporary visas expired, the Wang family remained in the United States as undocumented immigrants in Brooklyn.

Wang's father enrolled her at P.S. 124 in Chinatown, but few of her classmates and teachers spoke Mandarin Chinese, thus isolating her even within a seemingly familiar community. Unable to speak English or Cantonese, Wang was initially placed in a special-needs classroom, but was returned to mainstream instruction after she was observed teaching herself to read English through picture books. After school, Wang worked alongside her mother in clothing sweatshops and a sushi processing plant.

Wang's early talent for writing was mistaken as plagiarism by an elementary school teacher, prompting her to deliberately hide her abilities throughout much of her primary education. After several years in the US, Wang and her mother emigrated to Canada, in anticipation of better prospects, and her father followed sometime thereafter. Wang returned to the United States to attend Swarthmore College.

Her upbringing in poverty in America is the subject of Wang's breakout memoir Beautiful Country.

== Career ==
After graduating from Swarthmore College with a Bachelor of Arts in English Literature, Wang earned her Juris Doctor (J.D.) from Yale Law School in 2012. She worked as an associate at Kirkland & Ellis and as an appellate litigator within the New York City Law Department before moving to Robins Kaplan, where she was elected to partnership within two years of joining the firm.

Wang declined Robins Kaplan's offer of partnership and currently serves as managing director/partner of Gottlieb & Wang LLP, a law firm focusing on special needs children and civil rights impact litigation. She decided to start writing her memoir, Beautiful Country, in the wake of the 2016 US election of Donald Trump as president of the United States. She had been a naturalized American citizen for six months by this time.

Wang wrote the book on her phone during her commute to her law offices, finishing a first draft in 2019 and publishing in 2021. She is working on a second book inspired by her experiences as an Asian-American working in corporate law.

== Personal life ==
Wang chose the Anglicised name "Julie" because of Asian-American puppet "Julie Woo" on The Puzzle Place.

Wang converted to Judaism, founding and leading a Jews of Color group at Manhattan Central Synagogue; on the day her debut memoir was released, Wang delivered a lay sermon to the congregation at Rosh Hashanah services. Wang is married, and she gave birth to a daughter in October 2023.

== See also ==
- Chinese Americans in New York City
- List of Yale Law School alumni
