= Alabama Army National Guard =

American military unit, founded 1807

- Seal of the Alabama National Guard
- Active: 1807 – present
- Country: United States
- Allegiance: Alabama
- Branch: United States Army National Guard
- Type: ARNG Headquarters Command
- Part of: Alabama National Guard; Alabama Military Department; National Guard Bureau
- Garrison/HQ: Montgomery, Alabama

Insignia
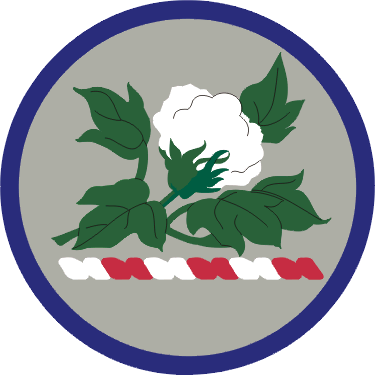
- Distinctive unit insignia

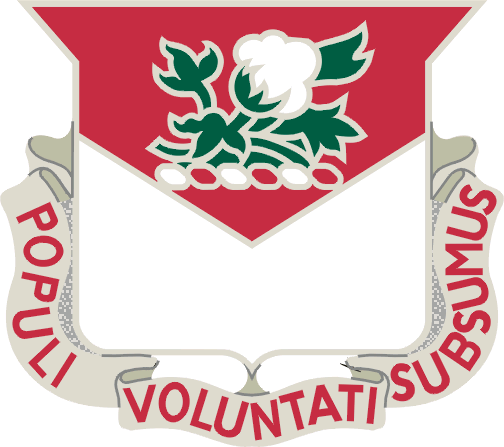
- Alabama ARNG Headquarters DUI

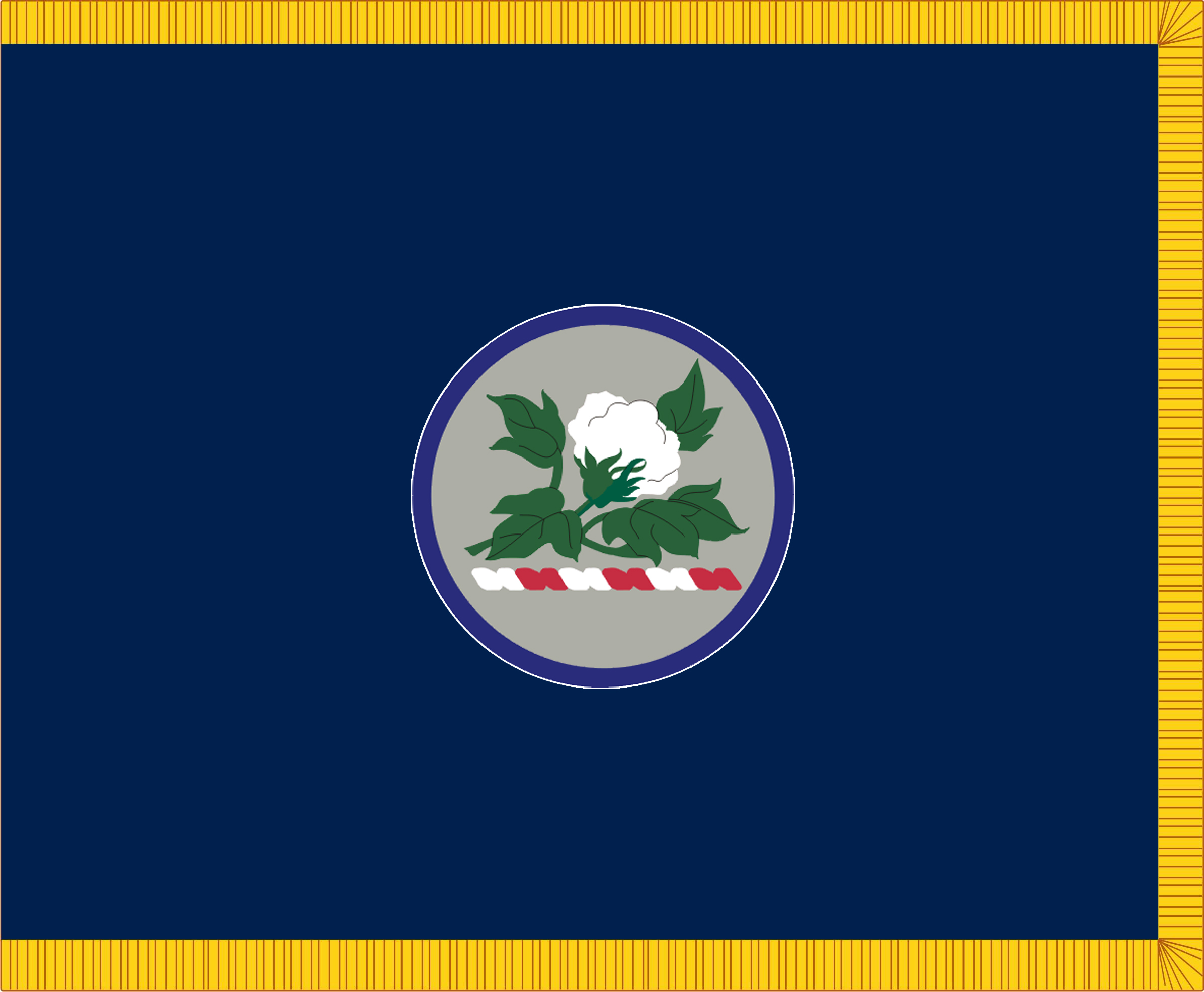
- Unit Flag Alabama National Guard Headquarters

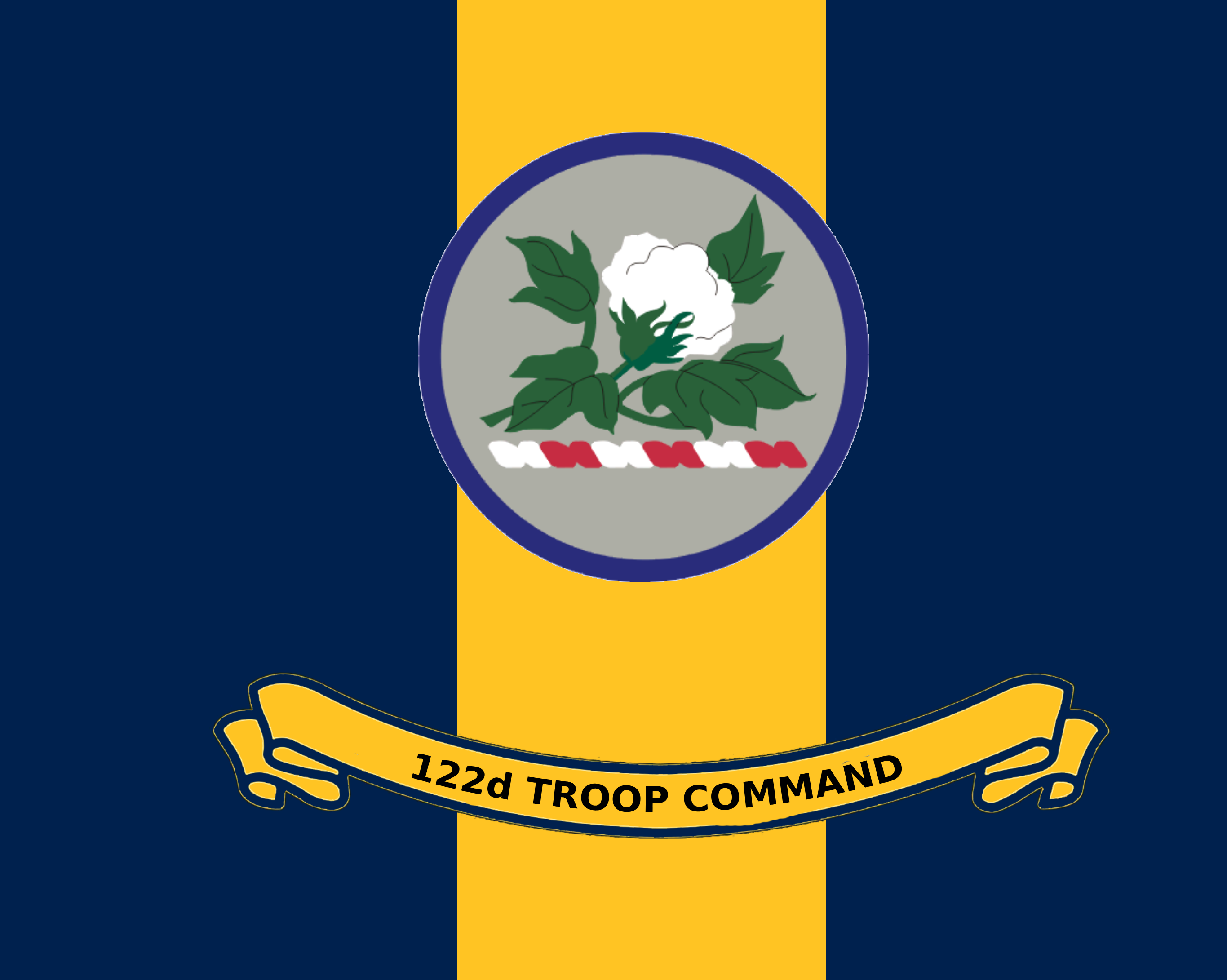
- Flag of 122nd ARNG Troop Command

The Alabama Army National Guard is a component of the United States Army and the United States National Guard. National coordination of various state National Guard units are maintained through the National Guard Bureau.

Alabama Army National Guard units are trained and equipped as part of the United States Army. The same ranks and insignia are used and National Guardsmen are eligible to receive all United States military awards. The Alabama Guard also bestows a number of state awards for local services rendered in or to the state of Alabama.

== History ==
The Alabama Army National Guard was originally formed in 1807. The Militia Act of 1903 organized the various state militias into the present National Guard system.

On the morning of 21 July 1861, the Union Army under the command of Brig. Gen. Irvin McDowell, in an effort to cripple the newly assembled Confederate Army at Manassas, Virginia, fired the opening shots of the first major battle of the Civil War. Both armies were largely made up of volunteer militia with regiments of both sides wearing blue and gray uniforms. The brunt of the Union attack fell on the Confederate left flank. Confederate Brig. Gen Barnard Bee, having recently resigned from the U. S. Army and still wearing his blue uniform, realized that the army's left flank was seriously exposed. Gen. Bee ordered the Fourth Alabama Regiment (of The Alabama Brigade) to advance rapidly in order to plug the gap in the Confederate line. For over an hour, the Fourth Alabama held position and repulsed several Union regiments. The gallant stand of the Fourth Alabama stalled the Union advance and gave the Confederate forces more time to regroup. The regiment played a prominent part in the fighting all day and contributed to the Confederate victory. The Battle of First Manassas proved to both sides that the Civil War would be a bitterly contested struggle. The Fourth Alabama went on to fight in every major battle in the Eastern Theater of the Civil War and never surrendered its colors. The heritage and traditions of the Fourth Alabama are carried on by the 1st Battalion, 167th Infantry, Alabama Army National Guard.

In 1965, the Alabama National Guard was federalized to protect civil rights advocates who were partaking in the Selma to Montgomery marches.

The 31st Infantry Division ('Dixie') had elements in Alabama for many years, though divisional HQ was in Jackson, MS. It was deactivated in 1968.

Following the inactivation, the Alabama Army National Guard was allotted the 31st Brigade, 30th 'Volunteer' Armored Division, located in Tuscaloosa. In 1973 the 30th Armored Division was inactivated and Alabama was assigned a new major headquarters, the 31st Armored Brigade (Separate), with its headquarters at Tuscaloosa. In 1979 the headquarters was shifted to Northport, Alabama. In 2002, the 31st Armored Brigade was inactivated, merging into the 149th Armored Brigade headquartered in Kentucky. Alabama was again assigned a new major headquarters, the 122nd Chemical Brigade, later redesignated as the 31st Chemical Brigade.

Approximately 300 Alabama ARNG soldiers deployed to Iraq with the Combat Aviation Brigade, 36th Infantry Division ('Task Force Mustang'), in September 2006.

The previously active 142d Signal Brigade was inactivated in August 2008. In 2009 the 142d Battlefield Surveillance Brigade was established.

On February 13, 2009, the comedian Sacha Baron Cohen tricked guard officers into allowing him to participate in training at the Alabama Military Academy at Fort McClellan. The officers were led to believe that Cohen was a reporter making a German TV documentary. The ruse ended when a young Alabama cadet recognized the actor. Guard spokesperson Staff Sergeant Katrina Timmons said on March 16, 2009, about the incident, "It's an embarrassment to the Alabama National Guard. Since then we have put in protocols to make sure this doesn't happen again."

Inactivated units included the 142nd Battlefield Surveillance Brigade, which was activated in September 2009; inactivation ceremony held on September 18, 2016. The 142nd BSB included a headquarters company at Decatur, AL; the 321st Military Intelligence Battalion, Austin, TX (from the United States Army Reserve); the 1st Battalion, 173rd Infantry Regiment, Enterprise, AL; the 31st Brigade Support Company, Ozark, AL; and the 67th Network Support Company, part of the Montana Army National Guard located at Billings, MT.

Other historic units previously serving with the Alabama Army National Guard included the:

- 167th Infantry Regiment
- 131st Cavalry Regiment
- 200th Infantry Regiment
- 117th Field Artillery Regiment
- 203rd Field Artillery Battalion

== Duties ==
National Guard units can be mobilized at any time by presidential order to supplement regular armed forces, and upon declaration of a state of emergency by the governor of the state in which they serve. Unlike Army Reserve members, National Guard members cannot be mobilized individually (except through voluntary transfers and Temporary Duty Assignments TDY), but only as part of their respective units.

== Units ==
- 122nd Troop Command
  - 1103rd Combat Support Sustainment Battalion
  - 161st Medical Battalion (Multifunctional)
- Company A, 131st Aviation Regiment at Montgomery Regional Airport
- Company B, 131st Aviation Regiment at Mobile Regional Airport
- Detachment 1, Company C, 2nd Battalion, 151st Aviation Regiment at Birmingham–Shuttlesworth International Airport
- Company B, 1204th Aviation Support Battalion (Aviation Intermediate Maintenance (AVIM)) - the 1204th ASB disbanded in January 2016
- 167th Theater Sustainment Command
  - 440th Theater Opening Element
  - 279th Army Field Support Brigade
  - 111th Ordnance Group (EOD)
    - 441st Ordnance Battalion (EOD)
      - 641st Ordnance Company (EOD)
      - 666th Ordnance Company (EOD)
    - 1307th Engineer Detachment (EHCC)
  - 135th Sustainment Command (Expeditionary)
- 200th Regiment Training Institute (Schools, Studies and Academics):
  - 1st Battalion - Officer Candidate School
  - 2nd Battalion - Military Police
  - 3rd Battalion - Engineers, BNOC
- 62nd Troop Command
  - 1st Battalion, 167th Infantry Regiment (attached)
  - 226th Maneuver Enhancement Brigade
    - 31st Signal Company
    - 711th Brigade Support Battalion
    - 877th Engineer Battalion
      - 166th Engineer Company
      - 168th Engineer Company
      - 186th Engineer Company
      - 1151st Engineer Company
    - 1st Battalion, 117th Field Artillery Regiment (EAB FA 155 Towed)
- 31st Chemical Brigade
  - 145th Chemical Battalion
    - 690th Chemical Company (Recon/Decon)
    - 440th Chemical Company (Smoke/Decon)
  - 151st Chemical Battalion
    - 1343rd Chemical Company (Smoke/Decon)
    - 208th Chemical Company (Recon/Decon)
- 142d Military Police Brigade
  - 231st Military Police Battalion
    - 214th Military Police Company (Combat Support)
    - 217th Military Police Company (Combat Support)
    - 1165th Military Police Company (Combat Support)
  - 203rd Military Police Battalion
    - 128th Military Police Company (Combat Support)
    - 152nd Military Police Company (Combat Support)
    - 1166th Military Police Company (Combat Support)
- 20th Special Forces Group

== See also ==
- Alabama State Defense Force
- Transformation of the Army National Guard
