= Coats of arms of U.S. Support Battalions =

Coats of arms of U.S. Support Battalions are heraldic emblems associated with units in the US Army. By Army regulation, all regiments, and some other units, of the US Army organized under a table of organization and equipment are authorized a coat of arms to be displayed on the organization's standard, called the "colors." This coat of arms usually forms the basis for the unit's distinctive unit insignia (DUI), the emblem worn by all members of the unit on their service uniforms.

Below are galleries of the coats of arms of aviation support battalions (ASBs), combat sustainment support battalions (CSSBs) and brigade support battalions (BSBs).

== 1 to 99 ==
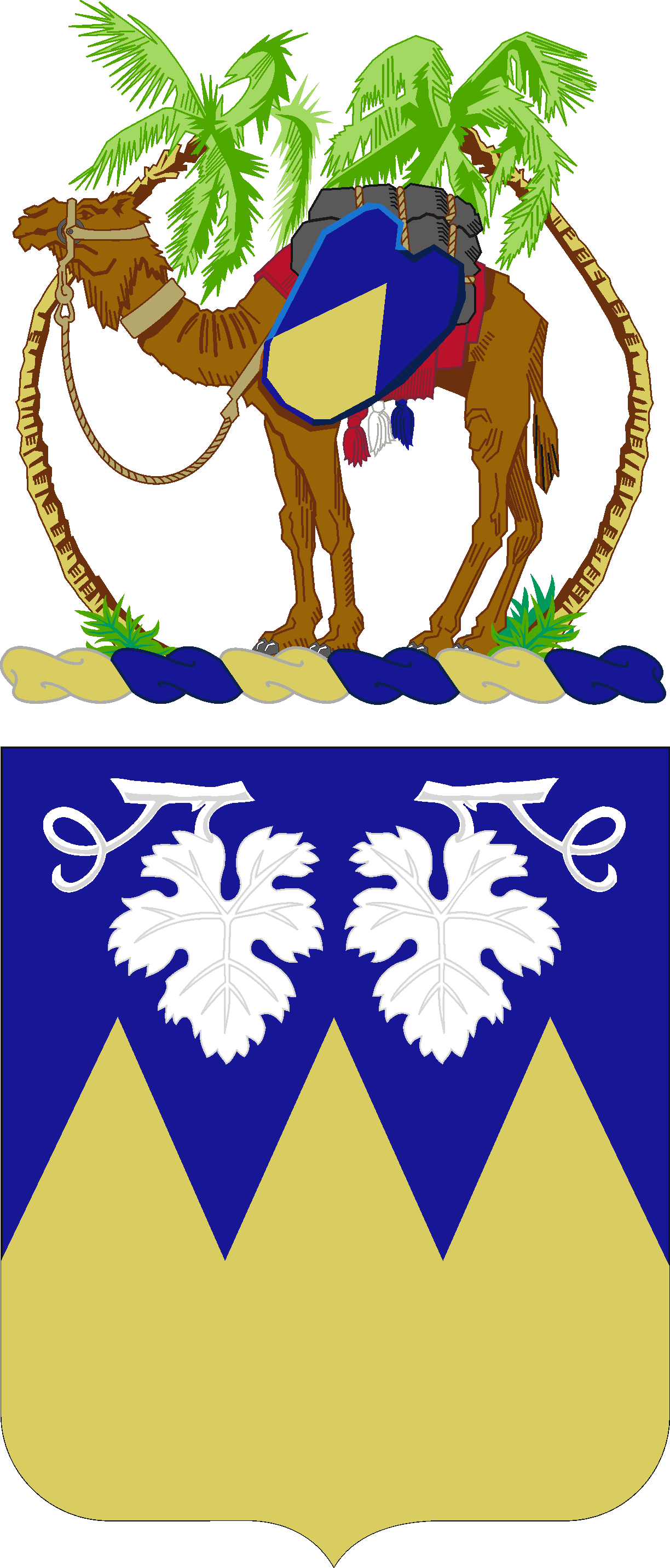
13th CSSB

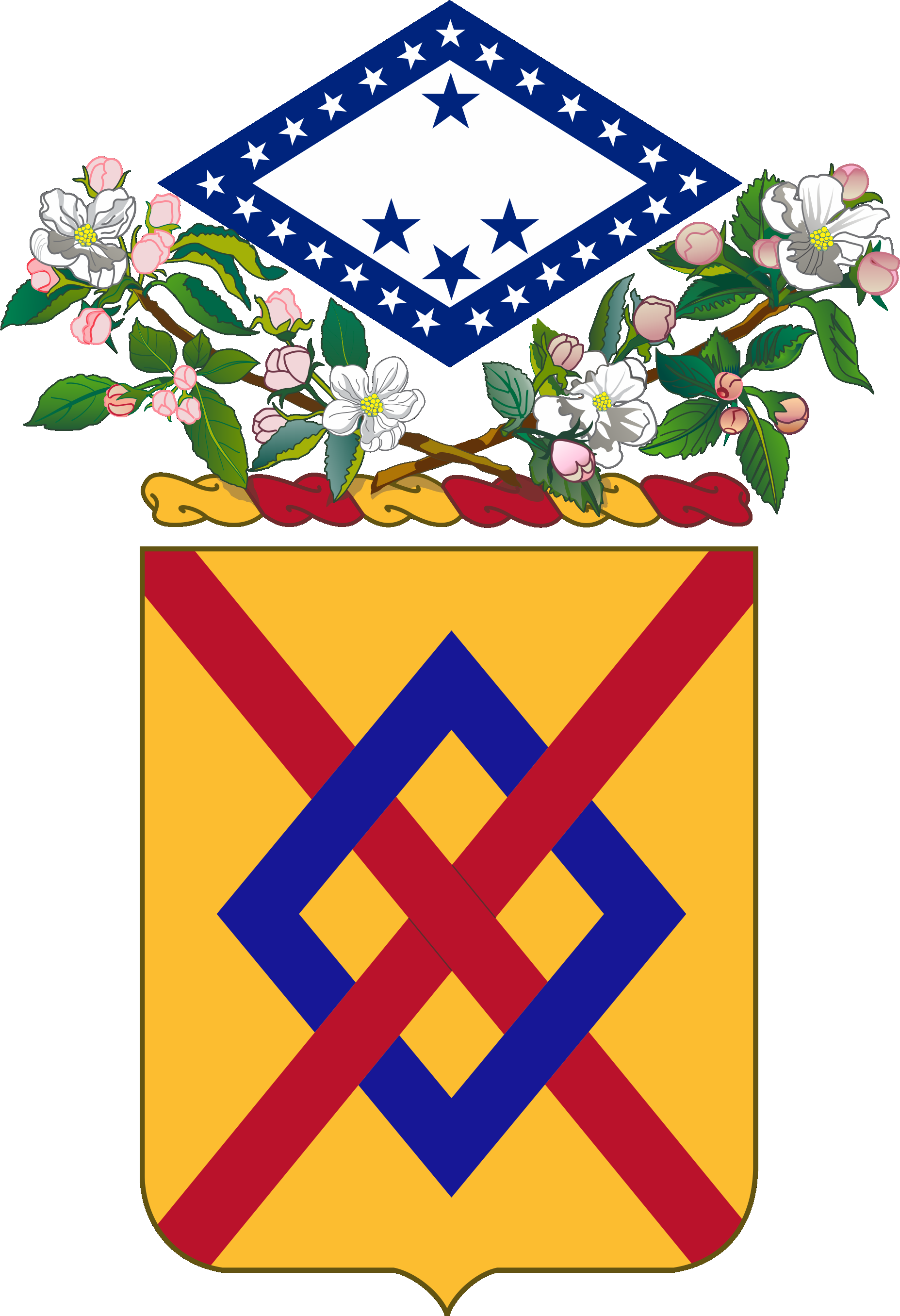
39th BSB

55th Support Battalion

63rd BSB

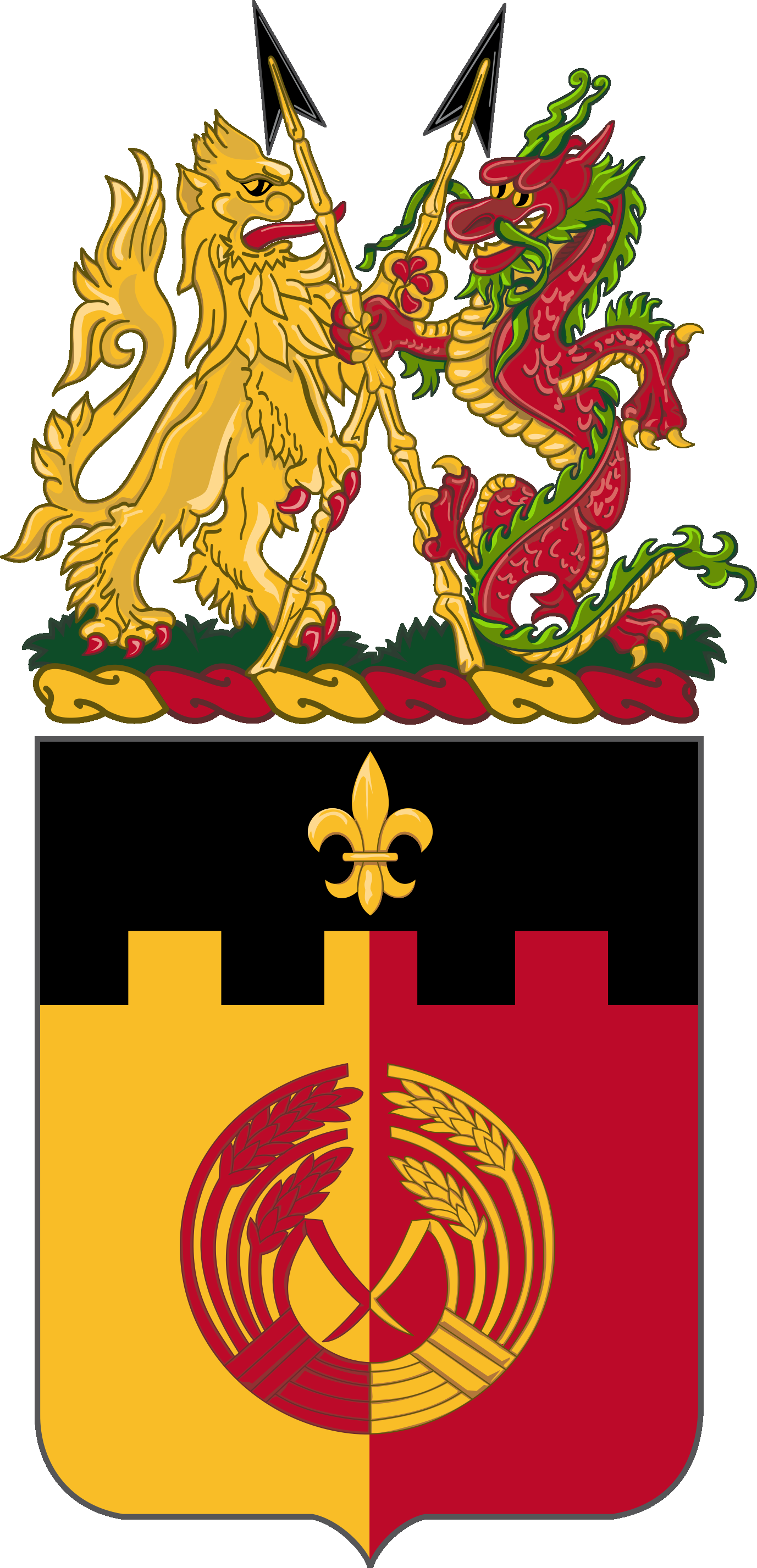
64th BSB

68th CSSB

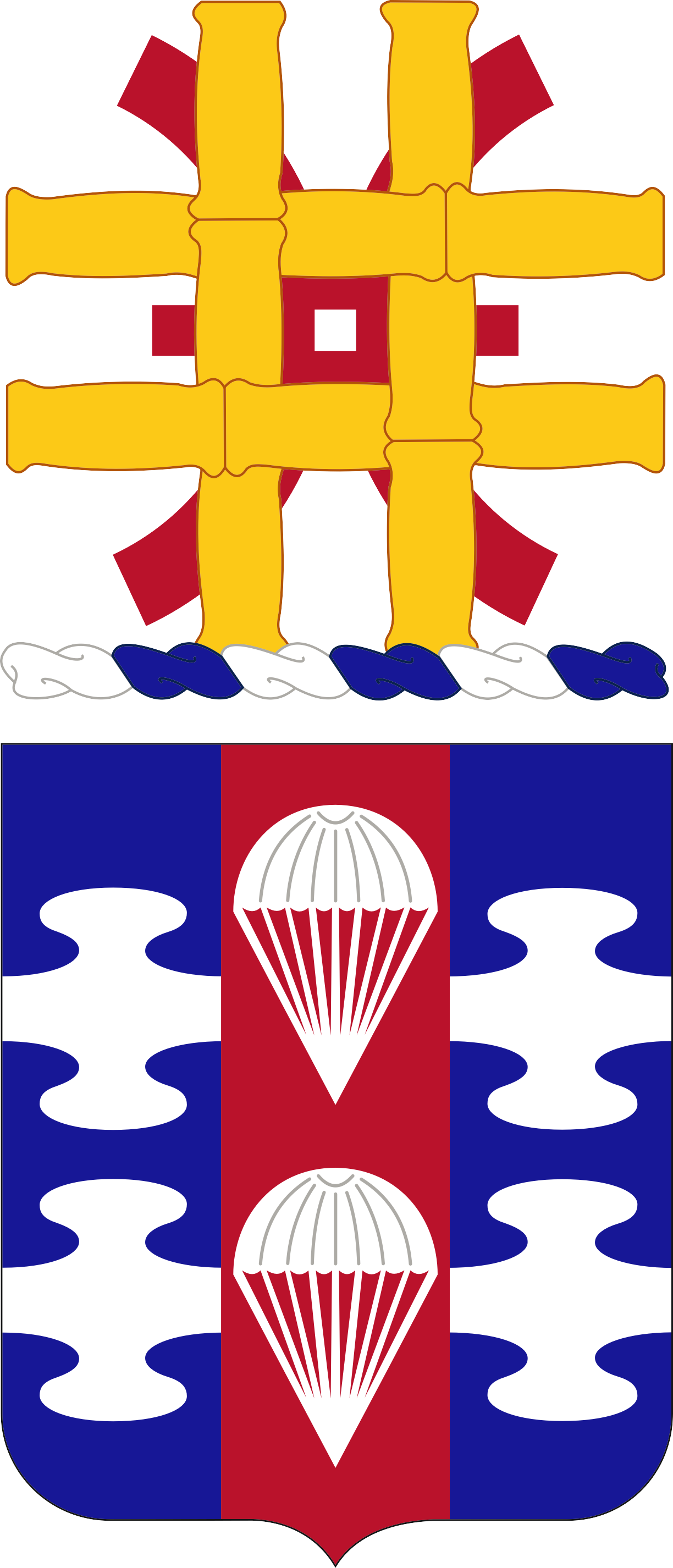
82nd BSB

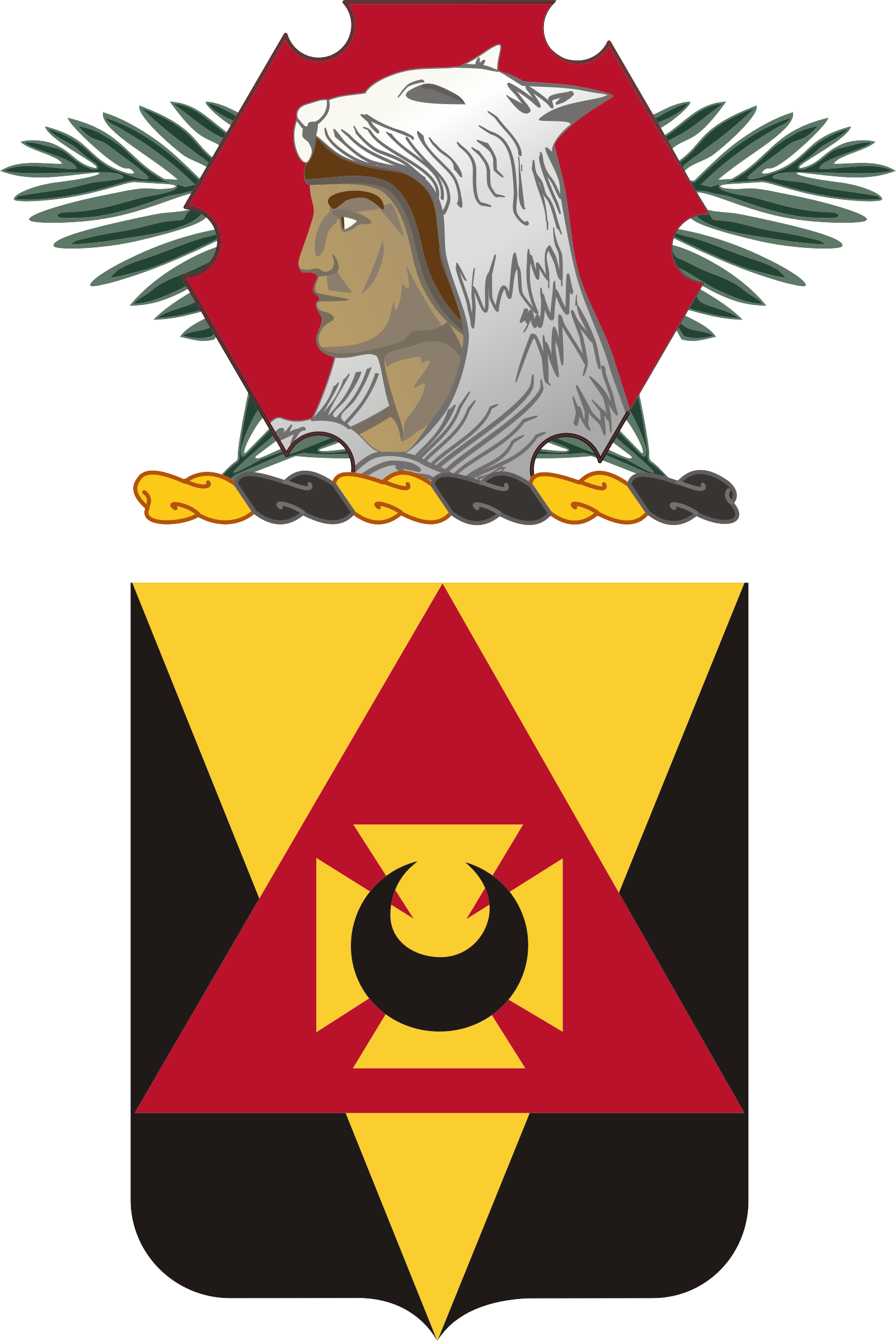
87th CSSB

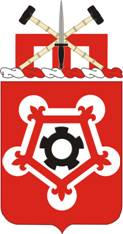
88th BSB

== 100 to 299 ==
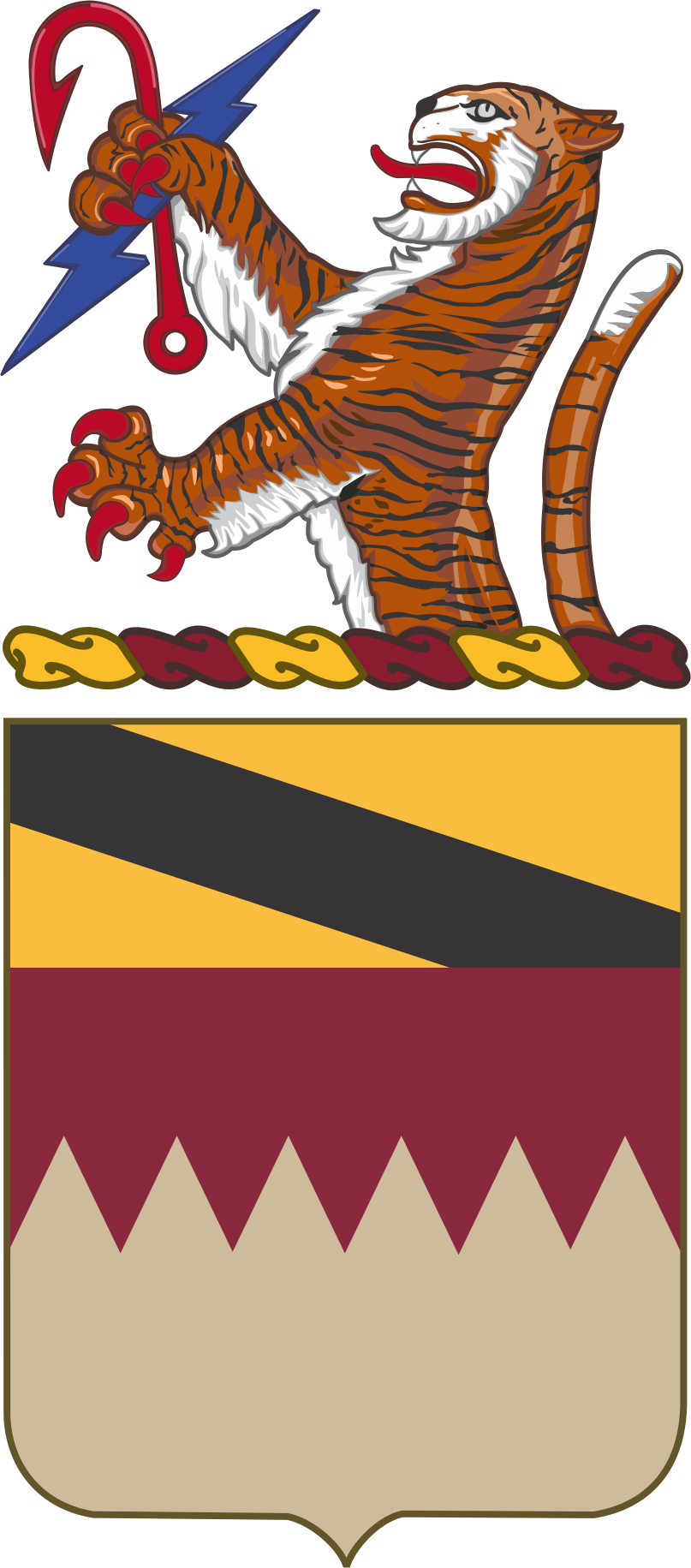
115th BSB

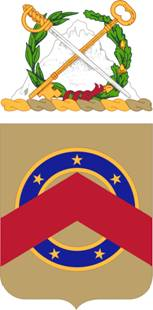
125th BSB

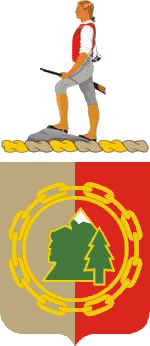
167th Support Battalion

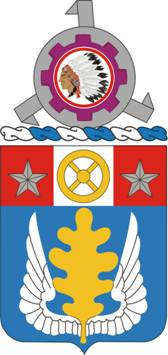
168th BSB

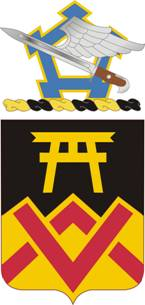
173rd Support Battalion

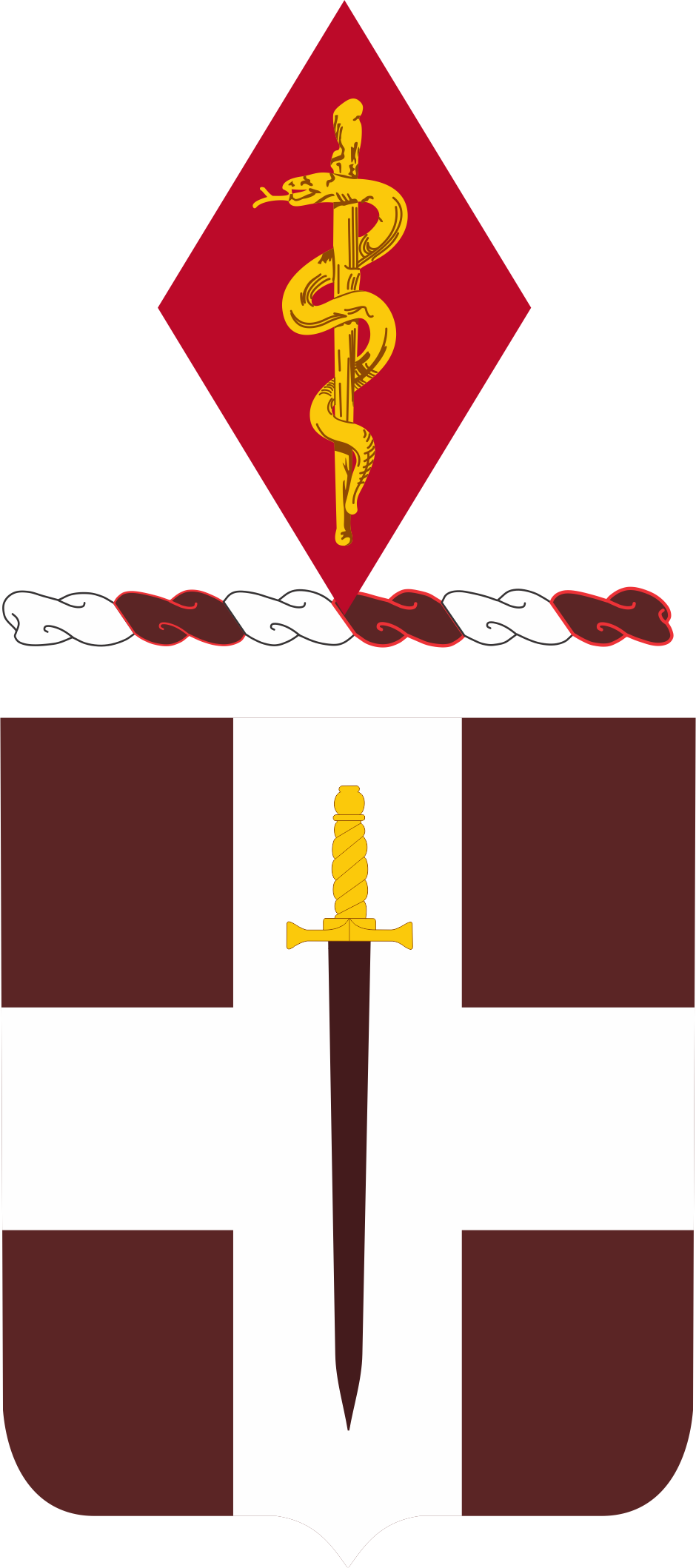
204th BSB

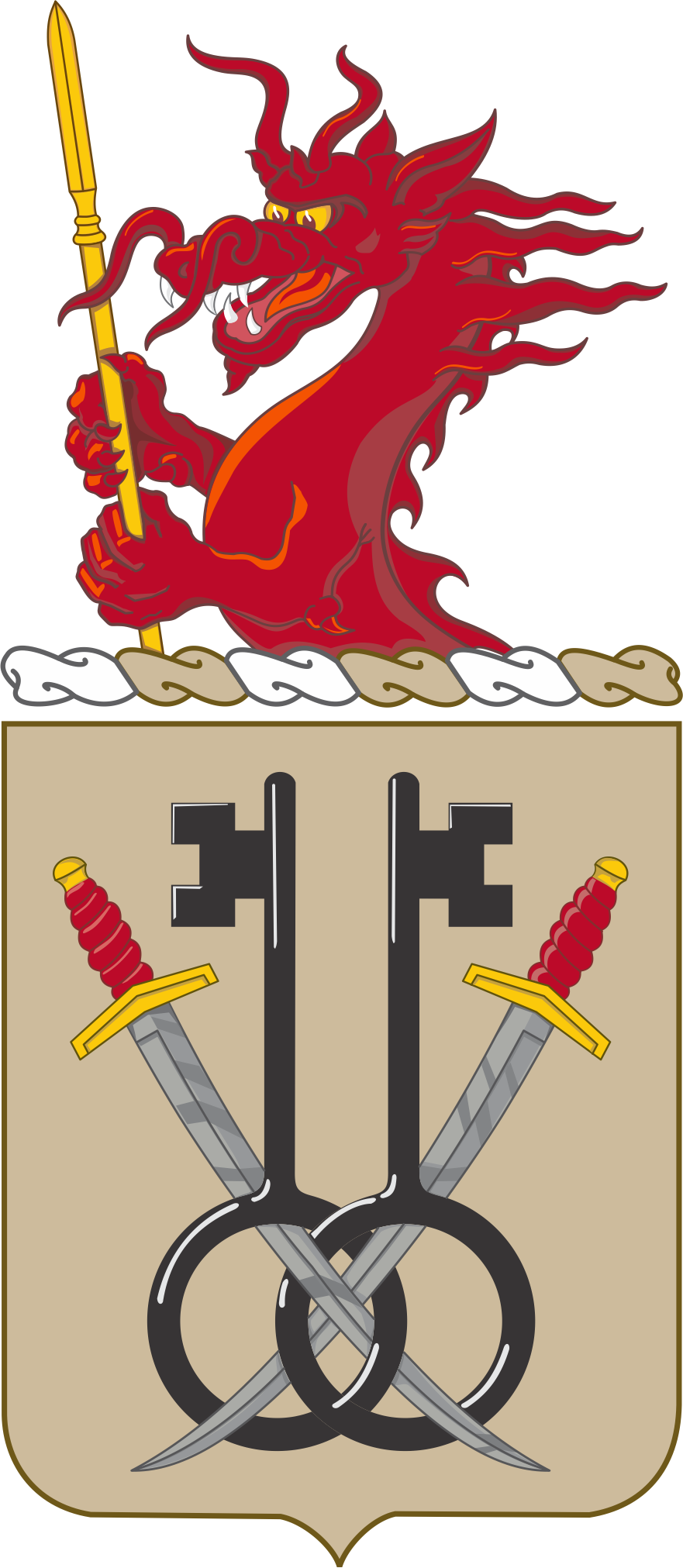
225th BSB

230th BSB

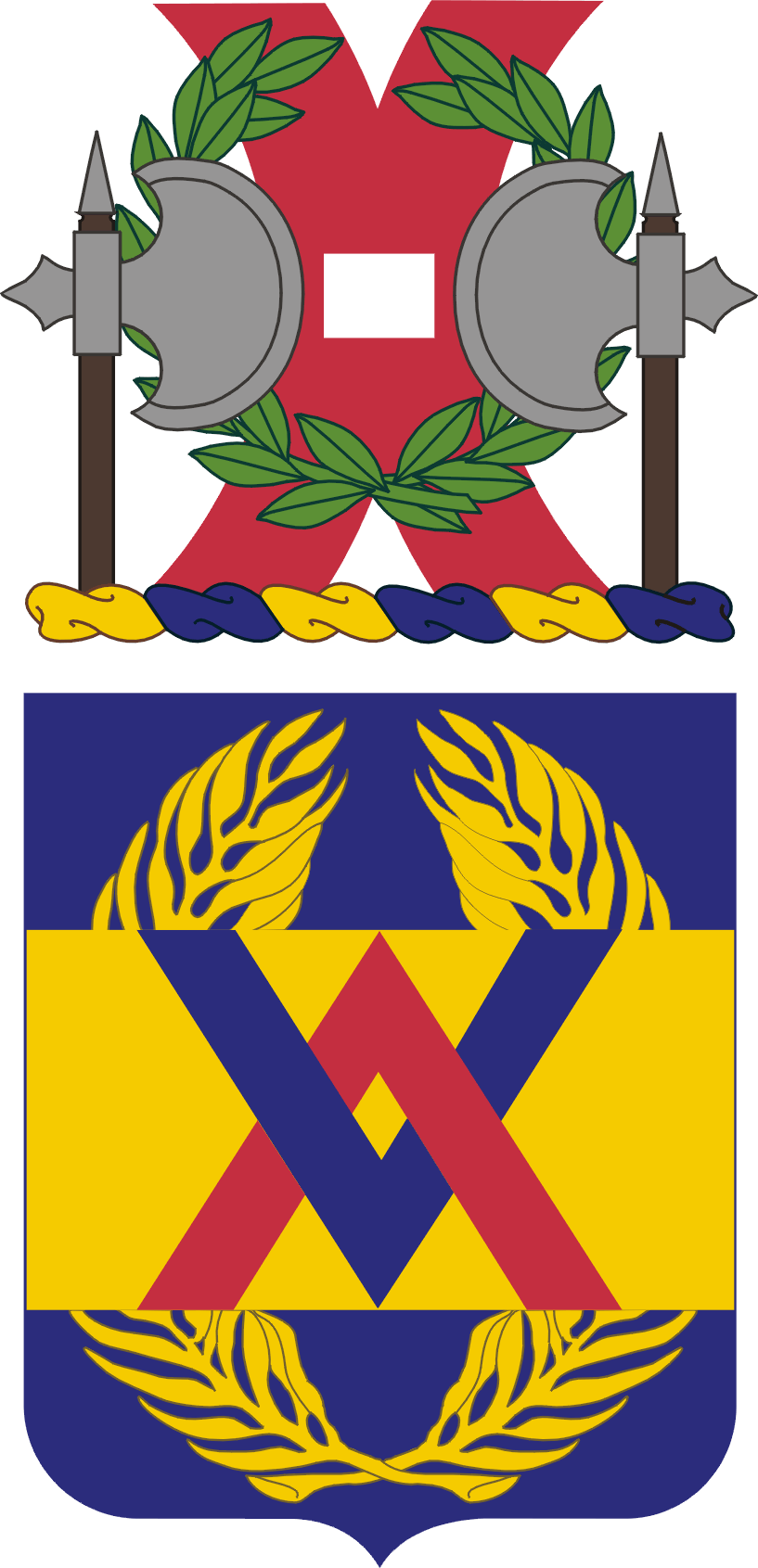
264th CSSB

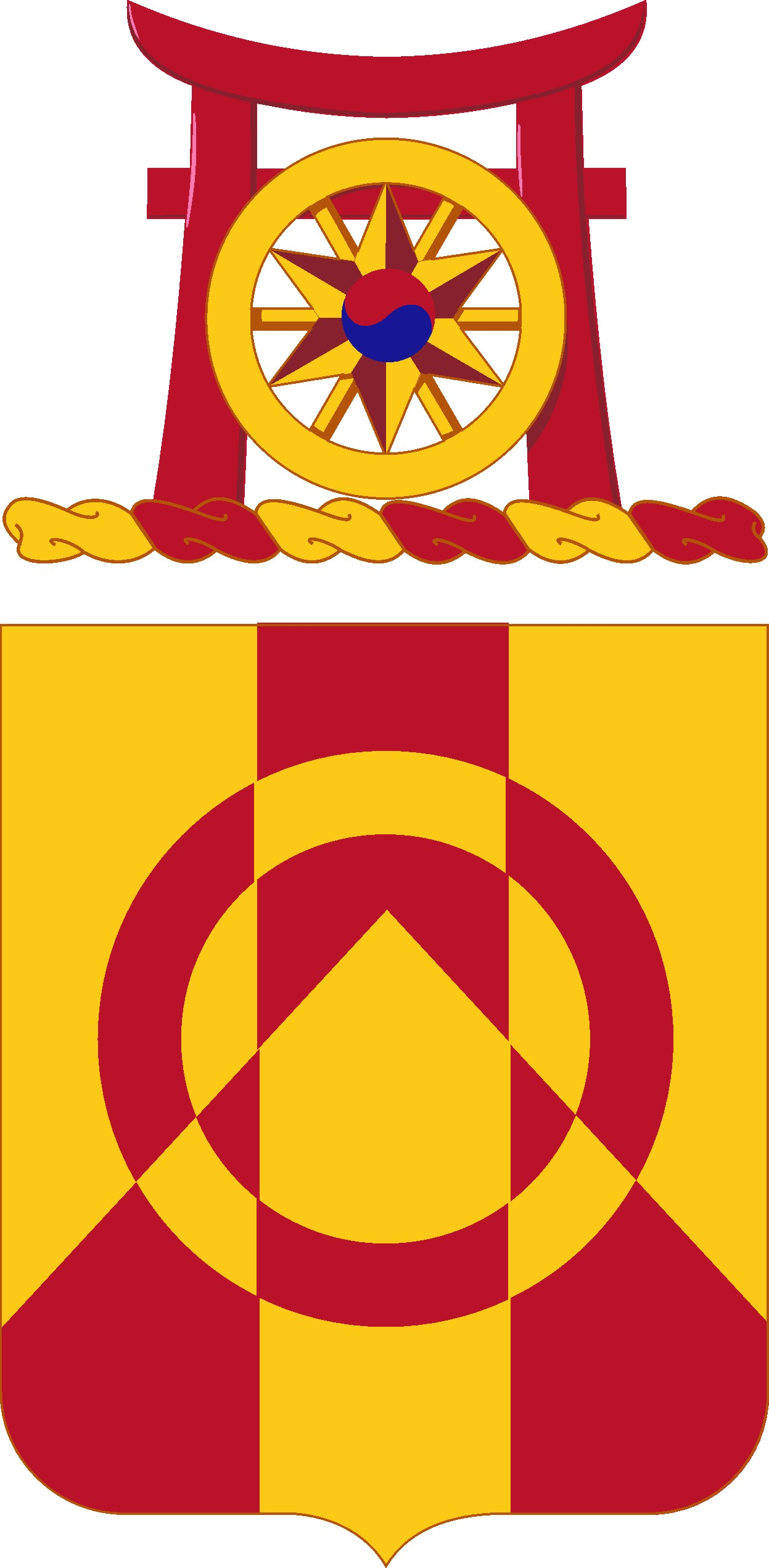
296th BSB

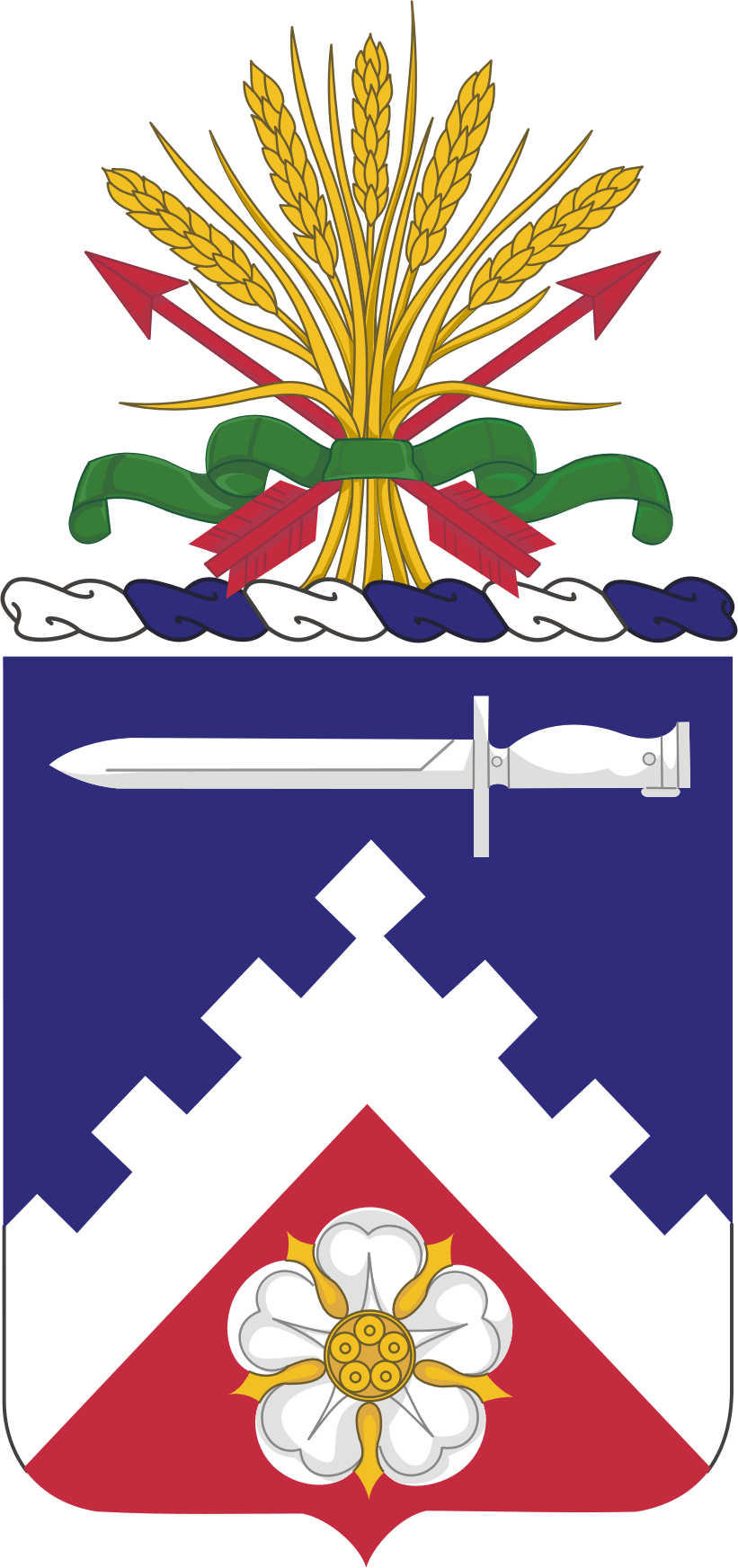
299th BSB

== 300 to 499 ==
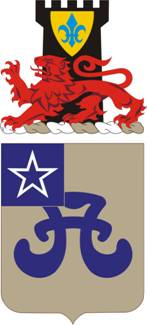
308th BSB

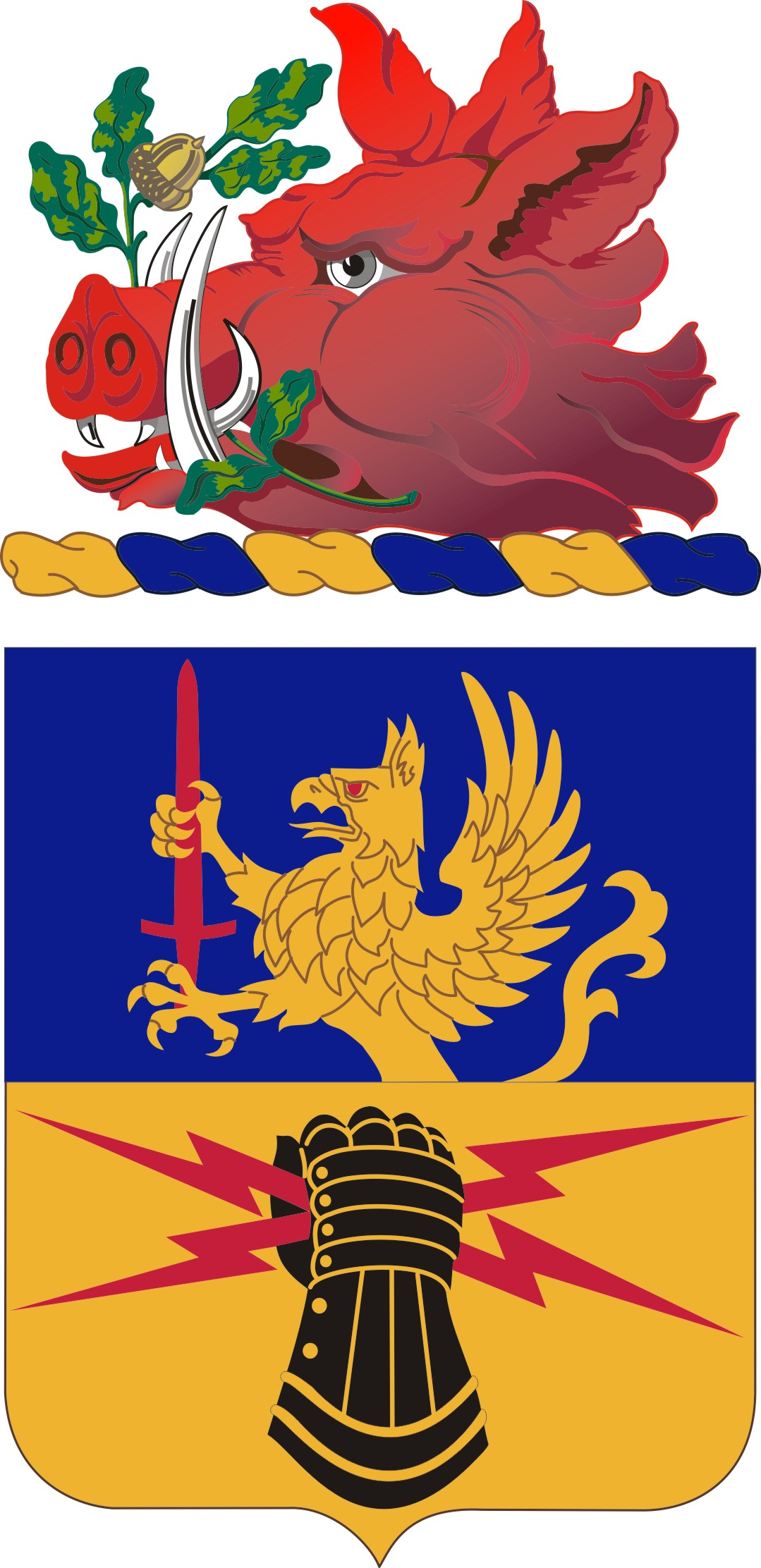
348th BSB

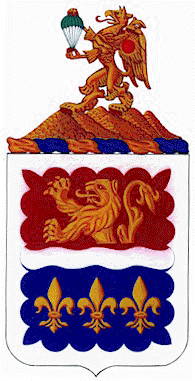
407th Forward Support Battalion

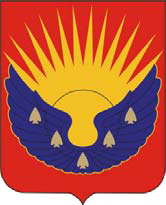
412th ASB

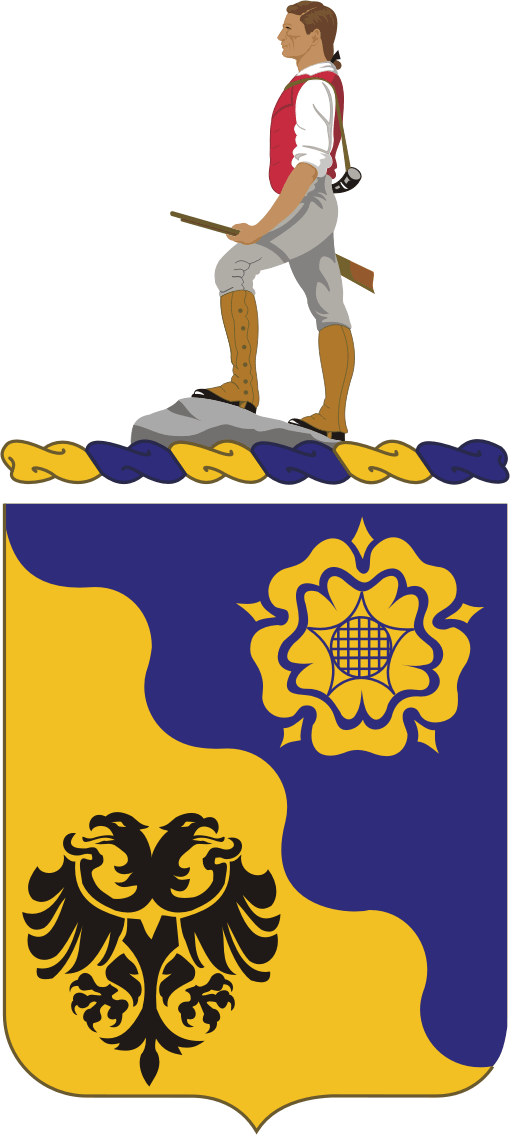
413th CSSB

449th Support Battalion

== 500 on ==
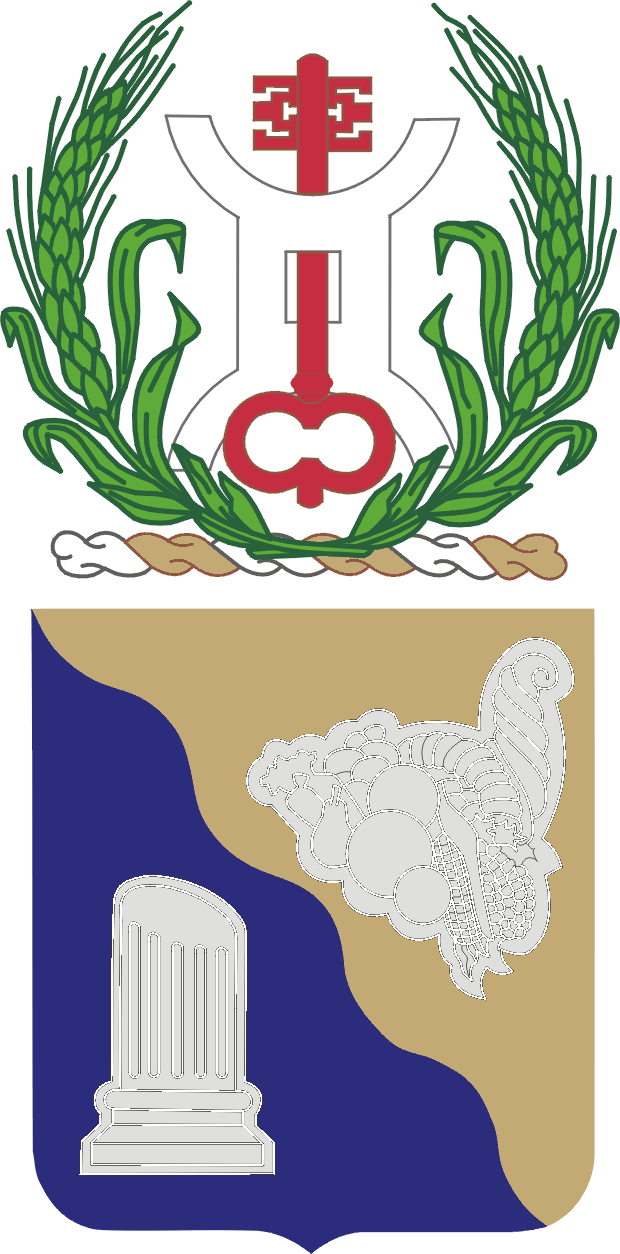
501st Support Battalion

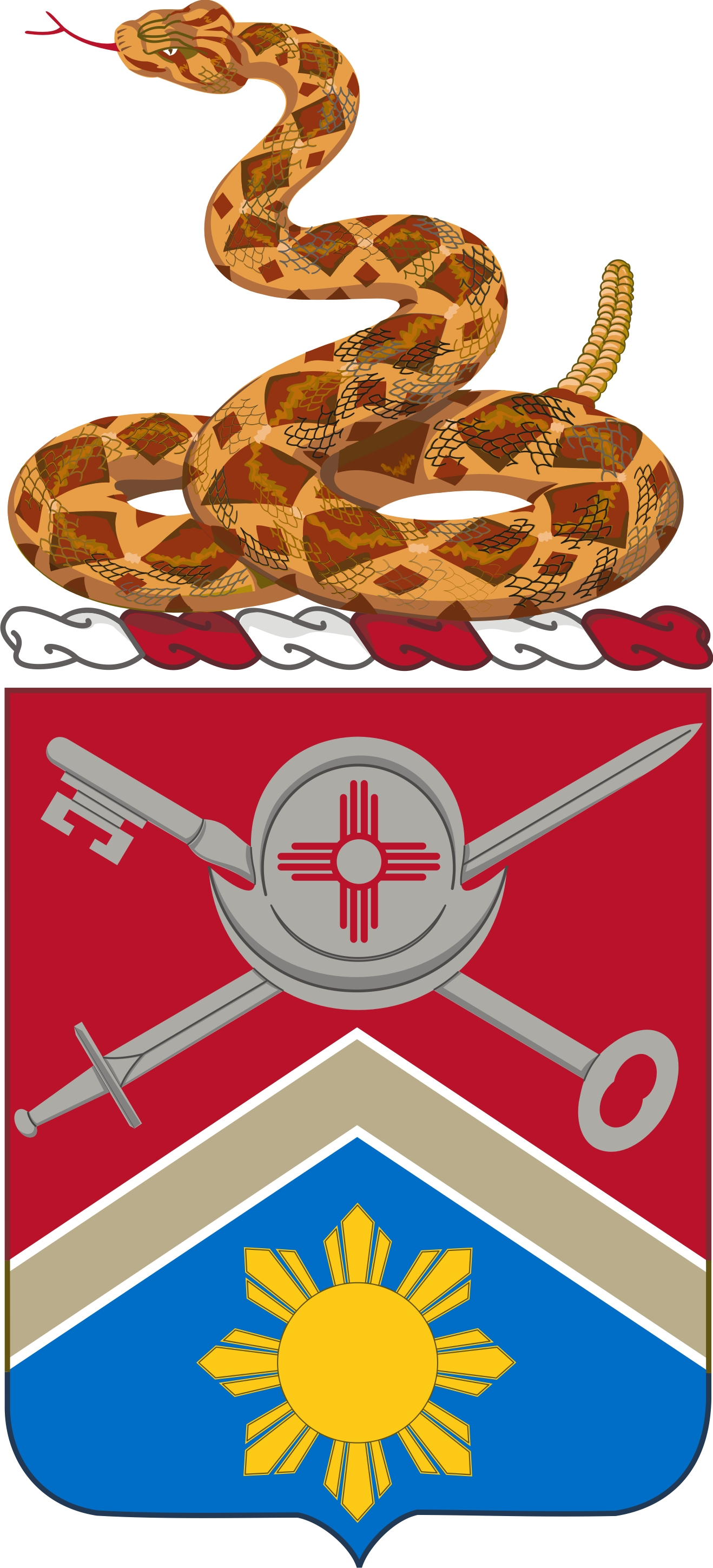
515th Support Battalion

526th Support Battalion

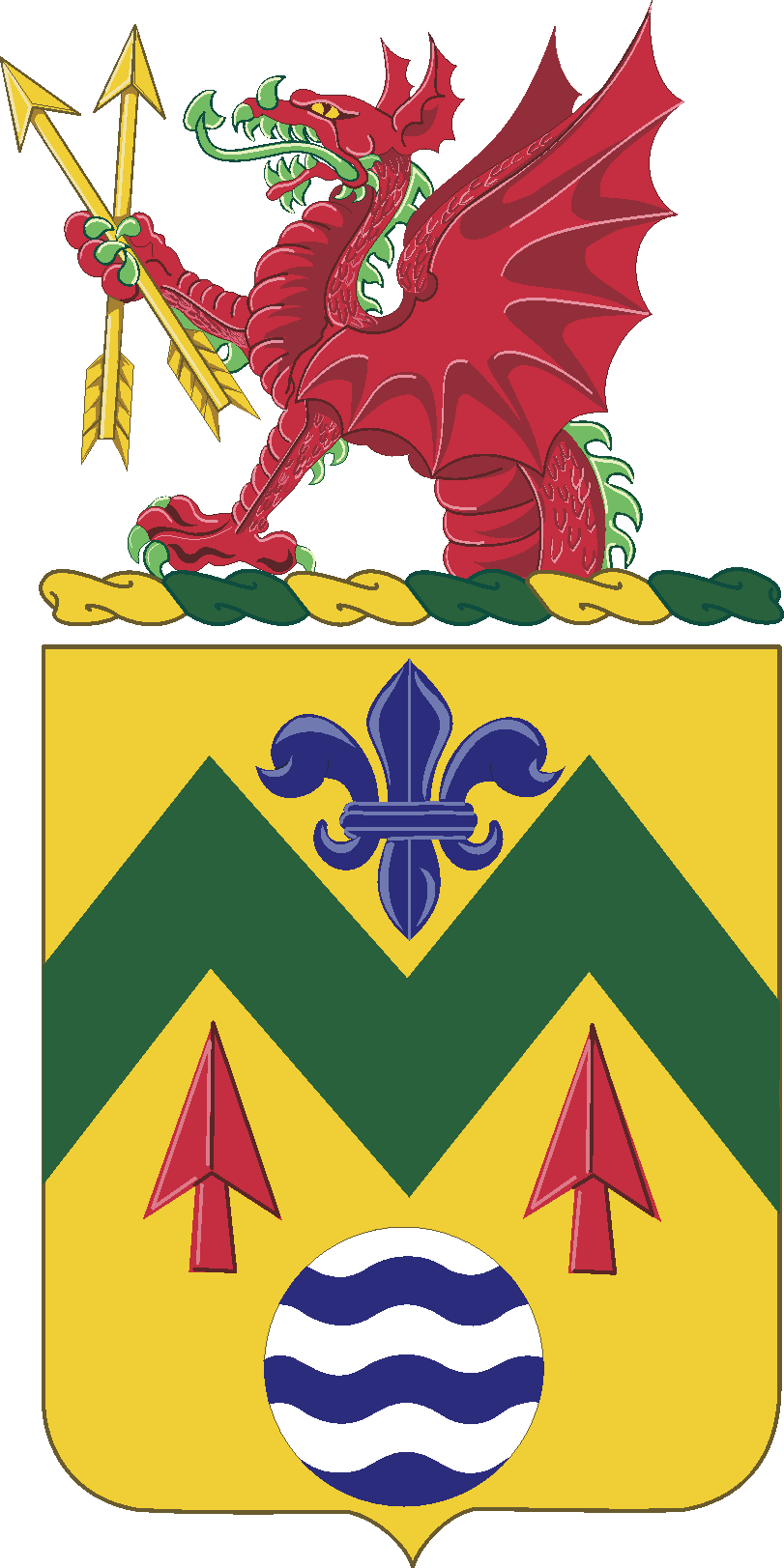
528th Support Battalion

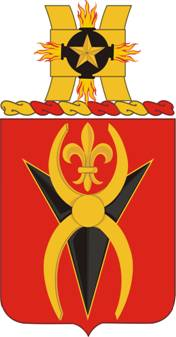
589th BSB

636th Support Battalion

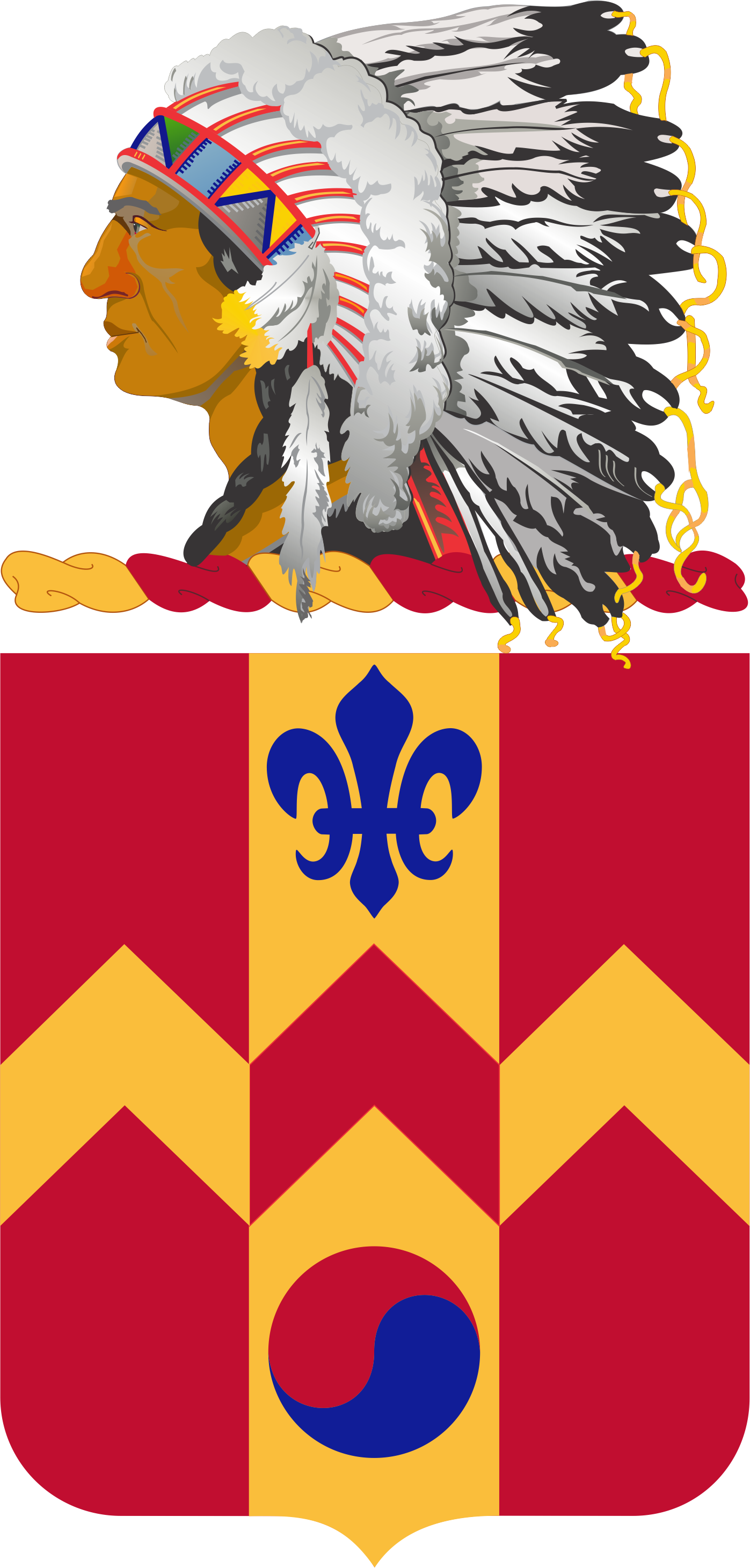
700th Support Battalion

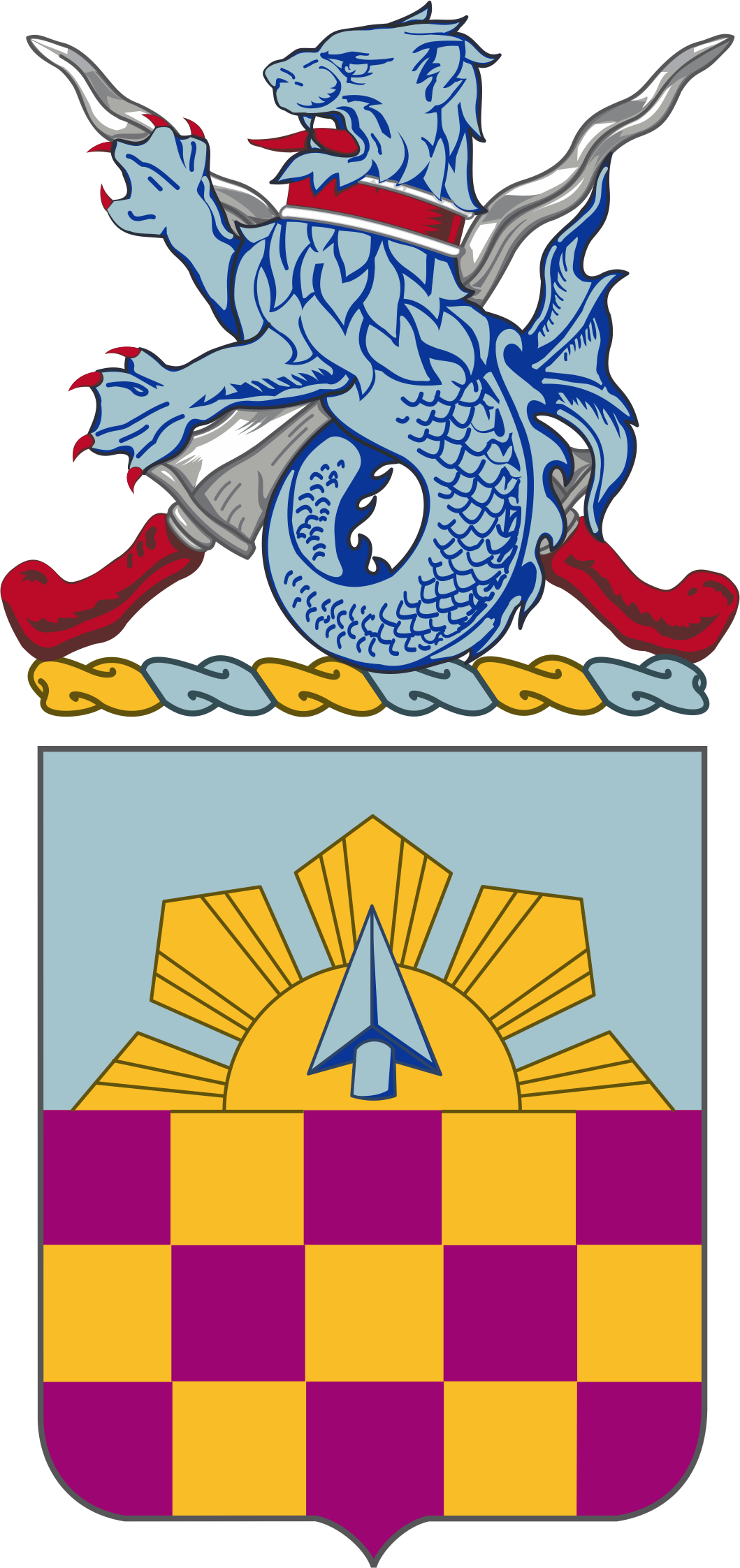
706th Support Battalion

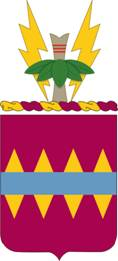
725th Support Battalion

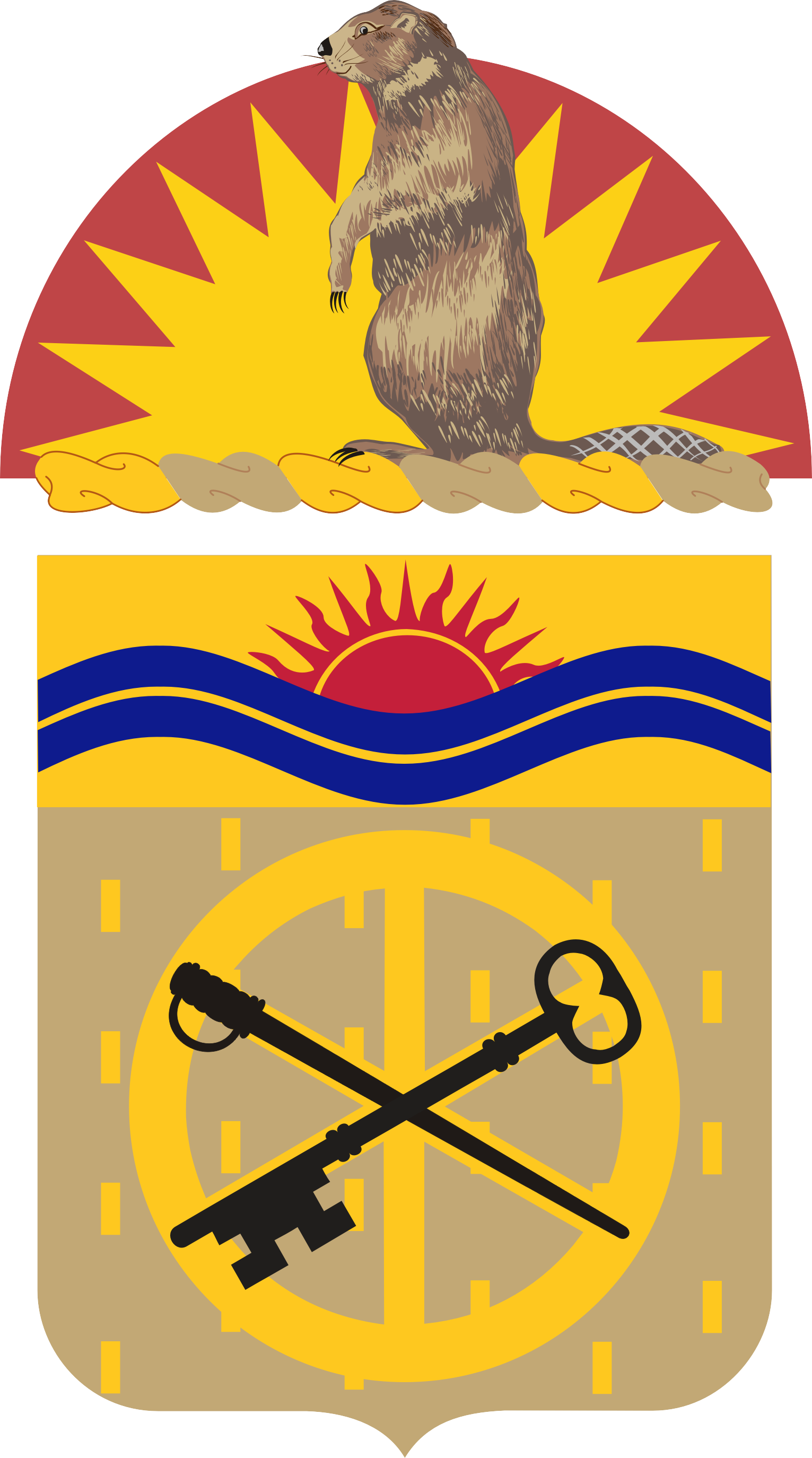
741st Support Battalion

834th ASB

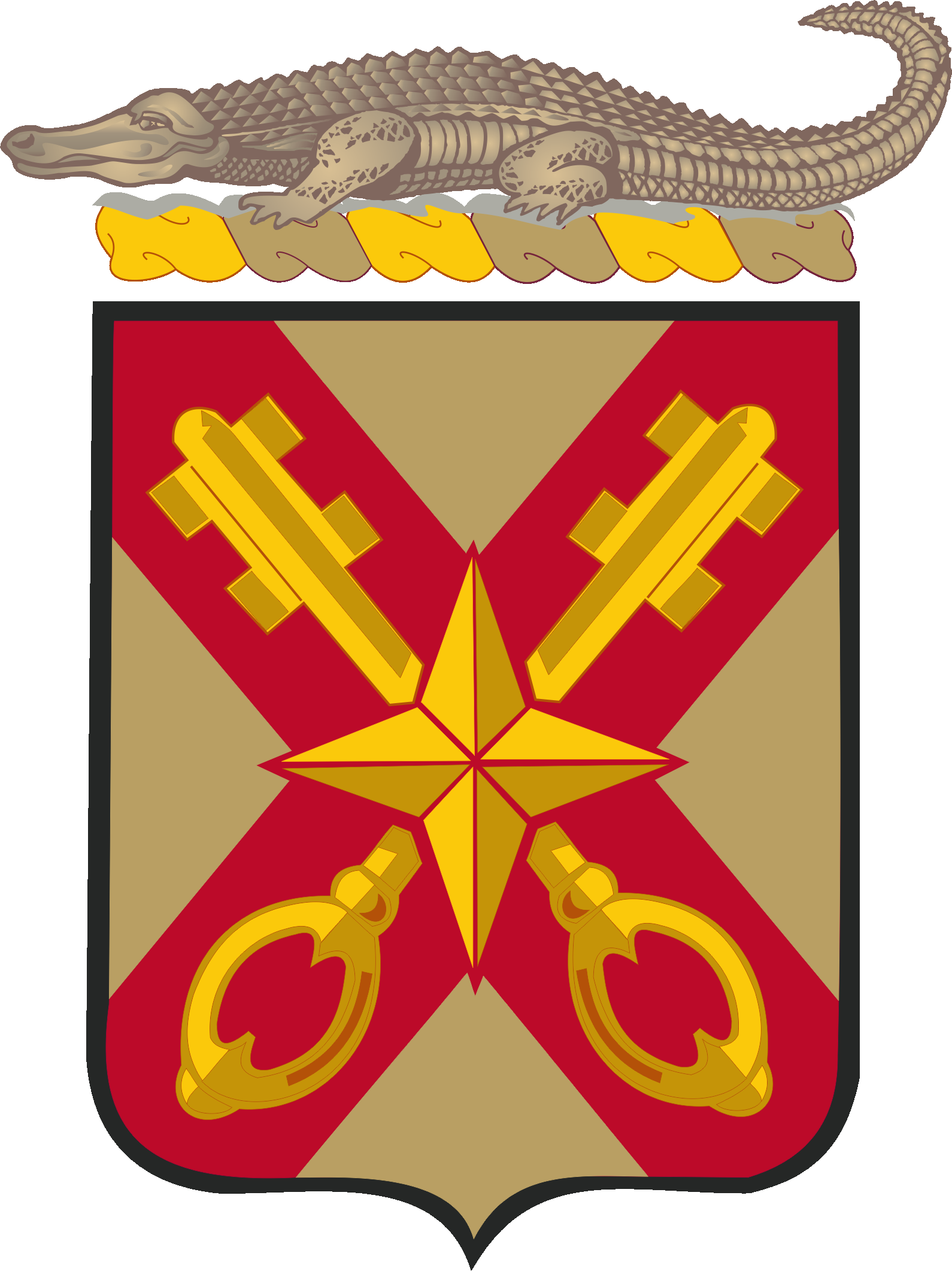
927th Combat Service Support Battalion

949th Support Battalion

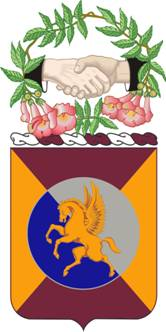
1204th ASB

== Sources & references ==
- Support unit Distinctive Unit Insignia, Shoulder Sleeve Insignia, Coat of Arms

== See also ==
- Coats of arms of U.S. Army units
- Brigade insignia of the United States Army
- Division insignia of the United States Army
