= 1160th Transportation Company =

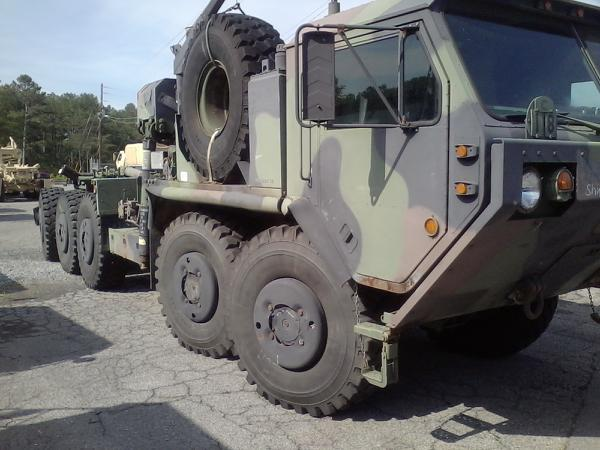
1160th Transportation Co

1160th Transportation Company (PLS) was constituted on 1 September 2009 in the Georgia Army National Guard to be known as the 1160th Transportation Company (PLS). The 1160th TC (PLS) is a member of the 348th Brigade Support Battalion, 648th Maneuver Enhancement Brigade. The unit was organized on 3 June 2010 from new and existing elements and is located in Rome, Georgia, USA.

== Mission ==
To provide trained, ready and stabilized forces in order to conduct ground transportation for the movement of cargo, breakbulk cargo, ammunition, and bottled water on PLS flat-racks, assist with the Transportation needs of units within the Georgia National Guard under the guidance and direction of the units Higher Headquarters. Be ready to serve the needs of the Citizens by order of the Governor of the State of Georgia by reacting to Emergency and Humanitarian needs on the home front, and be ready, trained and prepared to participate in Over Seas Contingency Operations as directed by the President of the United States.

== History ==
The unit was newly formed and does not have any historical lineage before June 2010, with the original unit becoming Company B, 1st Battalion, 169th General Support Aviation Regiment.

== See also ==
- 348th BSB (Higher Headquarters)
- 648th MEB (Unit Major Subordinate Command)
- Georgia Army National Guard
