= Alabama National Guard =

Component of the US National Guard of the state of Alabama

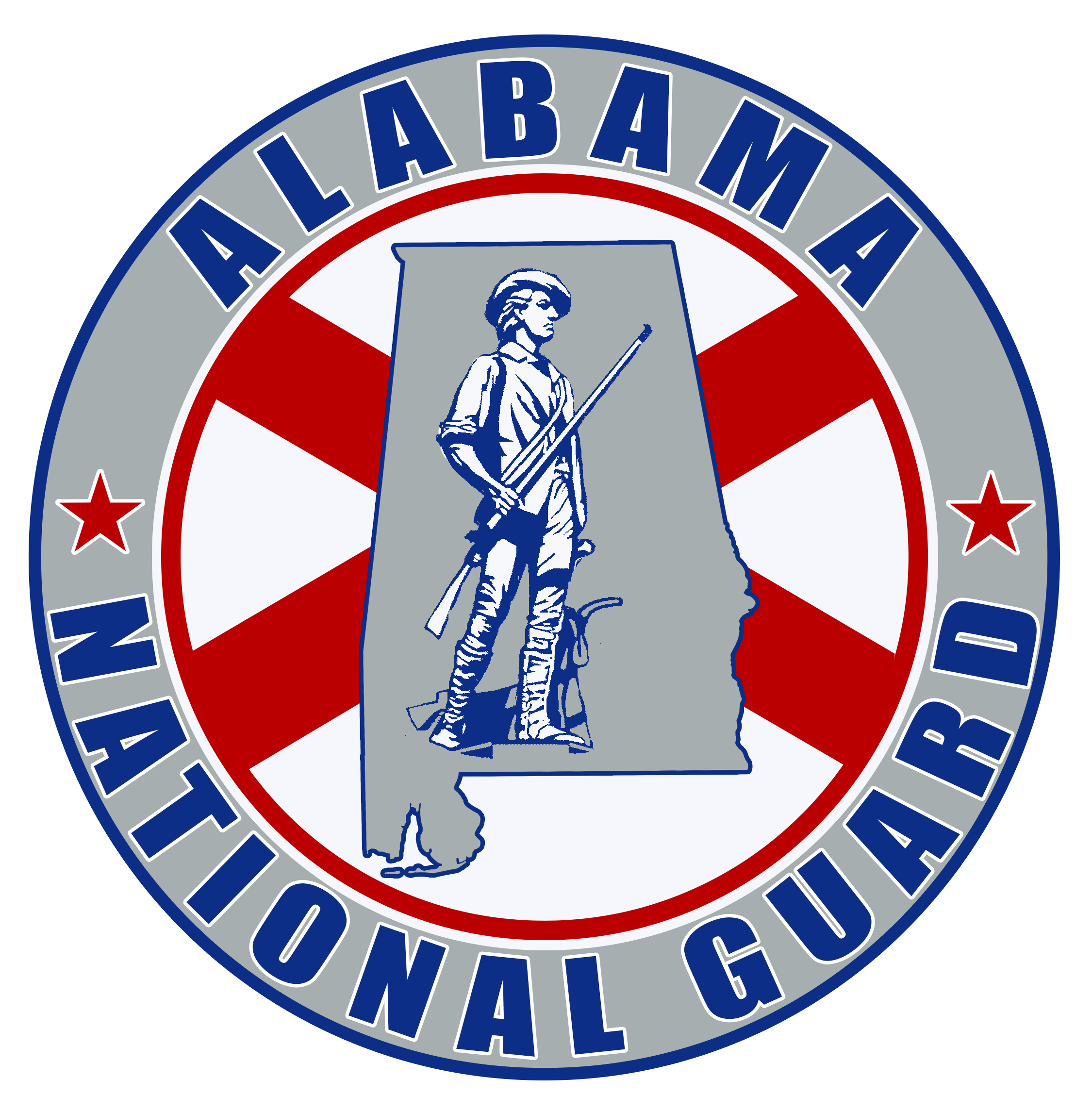
- Official seal of the Alabama National Guard since 2017
- Active: 1807–present
- Country: United States
- Allegiance: United States; Alabama
- Branch: United States Army; United States Air Force
- Type: National Guard
- Role: Reserve component of the U.S. Armed Forces; Militia
- Part of: National Guard Bureau; Alabama Military Department
- Headquarters: JFHQ-AL, Montgomery, Alabama
- Mottos: "Always Ready, Always There"

Commanders
- Governor: Governor Kay Ivey
- Adjutant General: MG David Pritchett, USA

The Alabama National Guard is the National Guard of the U.S state of Alabama, and consists of the Alabama Army National Guard and the Alabama Air National Guard. (The Alabama State Defense Force is the third military unit of the Alabama Military Department, part of the government of Alabama, however not a component of the National Guard). The National Guard is charged with dual federal and state missions. The state functions range from limited actions during non-emergency situations to full scale law enforcement of martial law when local law enforcement officials can no longer maintain civil control.

The National Guard may be called into federal service by the president under either Title 10 or Title 32 status. When National Guard troops are called to federal service, the president serves as commander-in-chief. The federal mission assigned to the National Guard is: "To provide properly trained and equipped units for prompt mobilization for war, National emergency or as otherwise needed." Technically the Alabama National Guard is currently under federal service as Executive Order 11111, which federalized the guard and was issued in response to the Stand in the Schoolhouse Door in 1963, was never revoked.

The governor may call individuals or units of the Alabama National Guard into state service during emergencies or to assist in special situations which lend themselves to use of the National Guard. The state mission assigned to the National Guard is: "To provide trained and disciplined forces for domestic emergencies or as otherwise provided by state law."

As authorized under the Constitution, Congress has the power to regulate National Guard units; hence they are trained and equipped as a part of the United States Army and United States Air Force, even when under state command. The same respective ranks and insignia are used and National Guardsmen are eligible to receive all United States military awards. All Alabama National Guard soldiers are also eligible for a number of state awards for local services rendered in or to the state of Alabama.

The Alabama National Guard has a State Partnership Program relationship with Romania.

== See also ==
- Alabama State Defense Force
- Militia
- Transformation of the Army National Guard
- List of armored and cavalry regiments of the United States Army
