= 142nd Military Police Brigade =

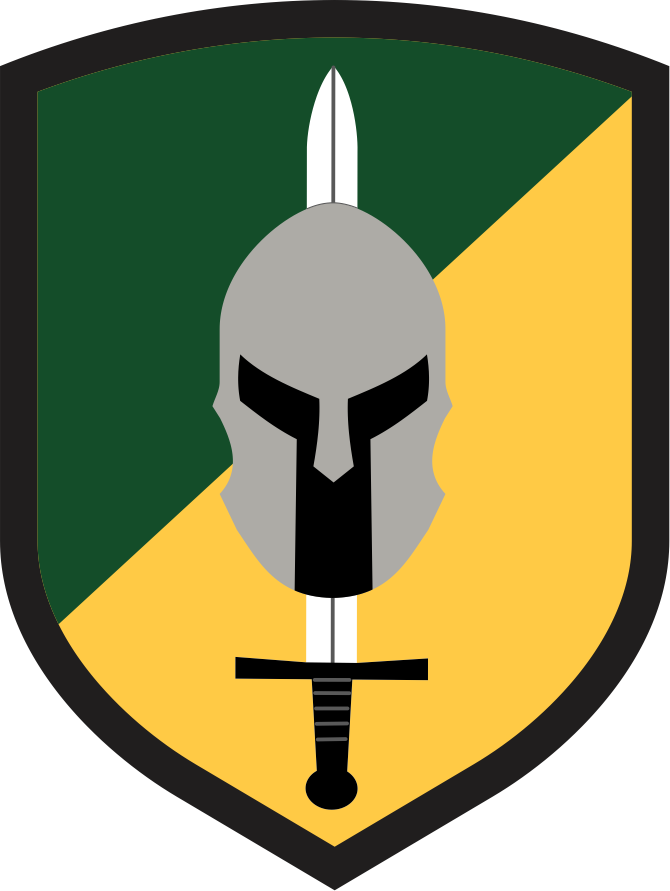
- Active: 2020 - present
- Country: United States
- Branch: United States Army National Guard
- Role: Military Police
- Size: Brigade
- Part of: Alabama Army National Guard
- Garrison/HQ: Decatur, Alabama
- Motto: Beati Pacifici (Blessed are the Peacemakers)

Commanders
- Current commander: Colonel Todd Wheeler
- Command Sergeant Major: CSM Jonathan Alred

Insignia
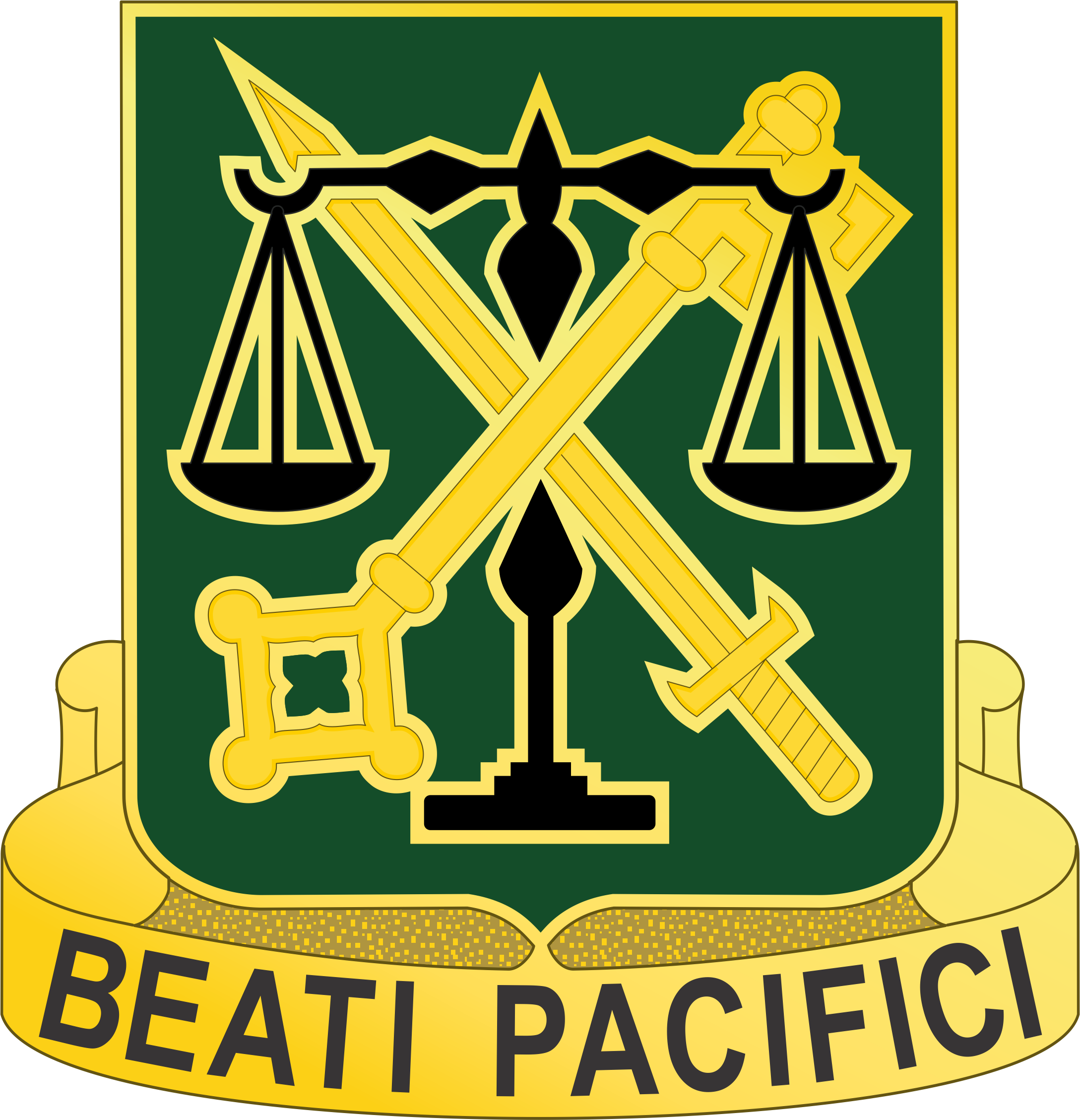
- 142nd Military Police Brigade DUI

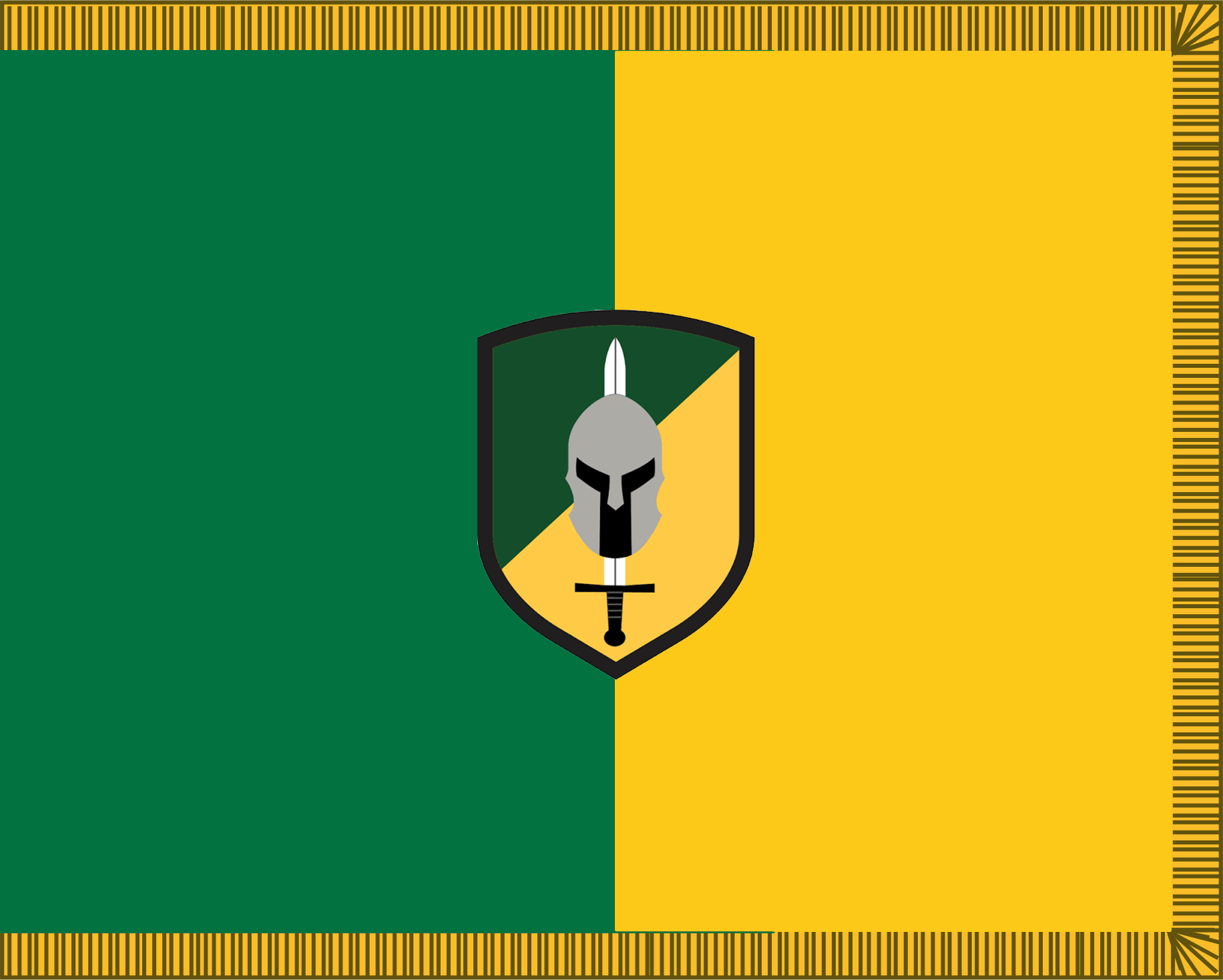
- 142nd Military Police Brigade Flag

The 142nd Military Police Brigade is a unit of the Alabama Army National Guard since June 2020. The Brigade was created to unify the military police units in Alabama under one command.

In 2024 elements of the brigade deployed to Cuba.

== Subordinate Units ==
- 203rd MP Battalion, Athens, AL
- 231st MP Battalion, Prattville, AL
- 142nd MP Company, Yongsan Garrison Seoul
