= 878th Engineer Battalion (United States) =

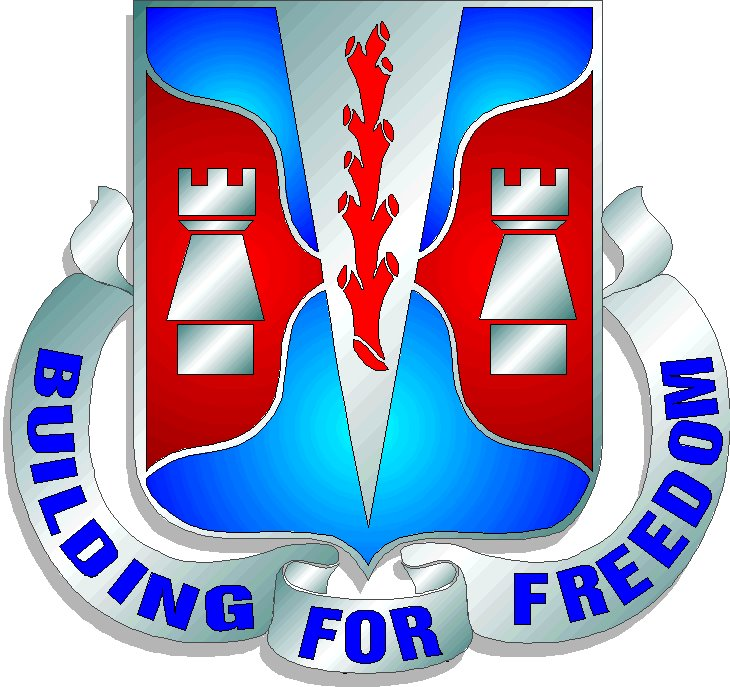
- "Essayons"
- Active: 1968-present
- Country: United States
- Allegiance: Georgia Army National Guard
- Branch: United States Army
- Type: Engineer
- Size: Battalion
- Motto: "Building for Freedom"

The 878th Engineer Battalion is a subordinate unit of the 648th Maneuver Enhancement Brigade (MEB) of the Georgia Army National Guard and is headquartered in Augusta, GA.

== Organization ==
- 878th Engineer Battalion, in Augusta
  - Headquarters and Headquarters Company, 878th Engineer Battalion, in Augusta
  - Forward Support Company, 878th Engineer Battalion, in Augusta
  - 177th Engineer Company (Topographic), at Fulton County Airport
  - 848th Engineer Company (Sapper), in Douglasville
  - 863rd Engineer Detachment (Utilities ), in Toccoa
  - 874th Engineer Detachment (Utilities ), in Toccoa
  - 876th Engineer Company (Engineer Support Company), in Columbus
  - 877th Engineer Company (Engineer Construction Company), in Augusta

== Deployments & Mobilizations ==
The 878th Engineer Battalion was organized on 1 January 1968 from already existing units within the Georgia Army National Guard.

Over the years, the 878th Engineer Battalion has assisted civic organizations throughout the state of Georgia by constructing baseball fields, softball fields, football fields, parks, lakes and other projects.

During the floods of 1994, elements of the 878th were assigned to flood ravaged areas of the state to reconstruct and repair roads, culverts and dams which were damaged or destroyed.

The 878th Engineer Battalion has also participated in numerous overseas deployments which include:

Year	Location	Mission
1985	Republic of Grenada	Rehabilitated Schools
1986	Somalia	Surveyed Bridge Site
1986	Panama	Constructed Field Medical Site
1987	Egypt	Constructed Base Camp and K Span Structures
1987	Jordan	Constructed Road and Helicopter Gunship Ranges
1988	Jordan	Constructed Road
1989	Somalia	Well Drilling Support
1989	Jordan	Constructed Base Camp and Tactical Air Range
1992	Oman	Constructed Airfield Extension, K Span Structures and Helipads
1995	Egypt	Constructed K-Span Structures and Tank Wash
1997	Republic of Georgia	Rehabilitated Children's Hospital and Orphanage
1999	Dominican Republic	Constructed Three Schools and Repaired Roads in the Wake of Hurricane Georges
2003 (March 15)	Iraq	Operation Iraqi Freedom
2009	Guyana	
2009	Afghanistan	Operation Enduring Freedom
2011	Germany	
2013	Afghanistan	Operation Enduring Freedom

=== Operation Iraqi Freedom ===
On 15 March 2003 the 878th Engineer Battalion was federally mobilized in support of Operation Iraqi Freedom. The battalion was initially assigned to Tallil Airbase outside the city of An Nasiriyah, Iraq under the command of the 130th Engineer Brigade.

While at Tallil Airbase, the battalion maintained approximately 72 kilometers of unimproved road on Main Supply Route (MSR) Tampa. The battalion hauled, graded and compacted over 59,500 cubic yards of fill; filled, graded and compacted over 15 km of sub-base; and applied 2 KM of Double Surface Treatment on MSR Tampa. The battalion also constructed and placed 6 guard towers; cleared fields of fire; and constructed earth berms to improve survivability at Military Police relay points along MSR Tampa.

The battalion conducted the master plan survey and design of Tallil Airbase; designed and installed the low voltage power grid for Camp Sapper II; constructed a 1 mile, 1/2 mile and 1/4 mile running track; and constructed a soccer field and eight sea-hut plywood buildings.

In addition, the battalion renovated the 16 Shubat Primary School in An Nasiriyah, Iraq which serves over 200 students.

The battalion also designed a water distribution system for the village of Abu Suwaich, Iraq and installed a lift pump to improve the quality of life for the local villagers.

Upon completion of its mission at Tallil Airbase, Iraq the battalion was moved to Al Taji Military Base, north of Baghdad, Iraq and served under the commands of the 1st Armored Division and the 1st Cavalry Division.

While at the Al Taji Military Base, the battalion operated construction supply and contractor entry points; constructed entry lanes and improved the primary entry point into the base.

The battalion also designed and installed 25 low voltage power grids; calculated the electrical demand load for the entire Al Taji Military Base footprint for the prime power design team from the US Army Corps of Engineers; and identified and recorded grid locations for the black water treatment/removal system.

Additionally, the battalion installed, repaired or renovated approximately 7 1/2 miles of 4 inch and below galvanized and PVC water distribution lines complete with main shut off valves and distribution gate valves. Over 300 emergency repairs were made to existing water distribution lines.

The battalion conducted the master plan survey and design of Al Taji Military Base which included over 180 building assessments completed and drawn using Computer Aided Design (CAD).

Over 524,000 cubic meters of debris was removed; over 1,178,000 square meters were cleared, grubbed and graded; over 130,000 cubic meters of gravel was hauled, spread and compacted; and the battalion contracted for over 31 million dollars' worth of building renovations while at Al Taji Military Base.

The battalion's average strength during the one-year deployment to Iraq was 479 soldiers and the battalion did not receive any combat casualties. The battalion redeployed on 3 June 2004 and demobilized at Ft Stewart, GA after serving approximately 15 months on active duty.
