= 131st Aviation Regiment =

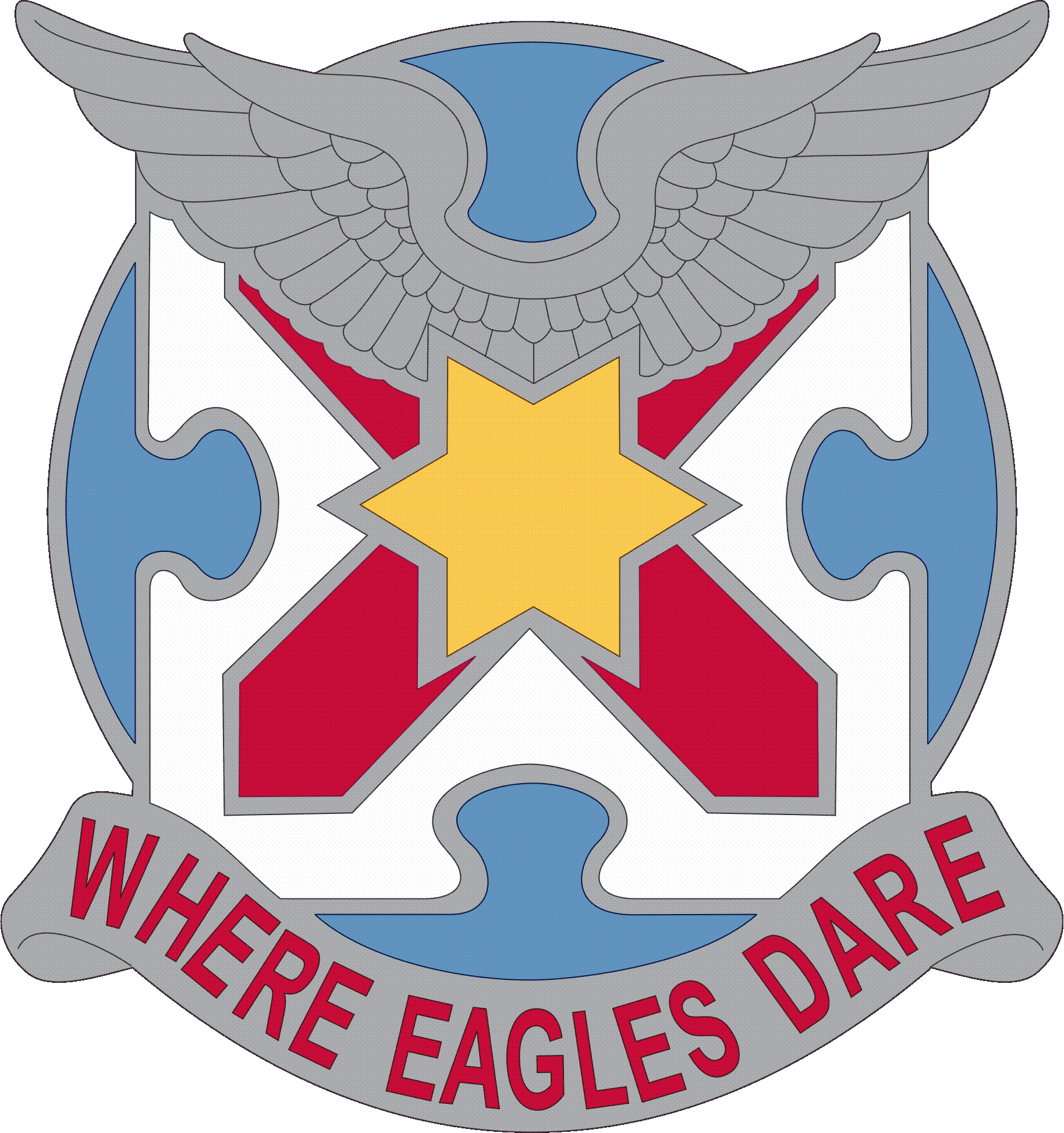
- 131st Aviation Regiment distinctive unit insignia
- Active: 1987 – present
- Country: United States
- Branch: Army National Guard
- Type: Aviation Battalion (Assault)
- Part of: 131st Aviation Brigade
- Garrison/HQ: Dannelly Field, Montgomery, Alabama

The 131st Aviation Regiment is a regiment of the United States Army, constituted under the United States Army Regimental System.

The 31st Aviation Company was first raised for the 31st Infantry Division (United States) in 1959. In 1964 the first unit bearing the name 31st Aviation Battalion was established, again as part of the 31st Infantry Division.

The 131st Aviation Regiment traces its history to the 31st Aviation Battalion. The battalion was organized, probably the second unit under that title, on 1 October 1986, from new and existing units in the Alabama, District of Columbia, and Florida Army National Guard as the 31st Aviation Battalion with headquarters at Montgomery, Alabama. Reorganized and redesignated 1 October 1987 as the 131st Aviation, a parent regiment under the United States Army Regimental System, to consist of the 1st Battalion and Companies E and F. Reorganized 1 September 1990 in the Alabama and Colorado Army National Guard to consist of the 1st Battalion and Companies E and F. Reorganized 1 September 1995 in the Alabama, Colorado, and Georgia Army National Guard to consist of the 1st Battalion and Companies E and F.

The 1/131st flew the CH-47 Chinook and UH-60 Blackhawk helicopters in the late 1990s.

== Structure ==
- 1st Battalion
  - Company A at Army Aviation Support Facility #1, Montgomery Regional Airport (AL ARNG).
  - Company B at Army Aviation Support Facility #3, Mobile Regional Airport (AL ARNG).
  - Company C at Army Aviation Support Facility #2, Rowan County Airport (NC ARNG)

== 1st Battalion ==
The 1st Battalion (Assault), 131st Aviation Regiment is a U.S. Army helicopter battalion. The unit first deployed to Kuwait in 1998 in support of "Operation Desert Fox." After several rotations in Kuwait the unit then entered Kosovo in 2003 (KFOR-5A) in support of "Operation Enduring Freedom". It deployed to Iraq in September 2006 as a subordinate unit of Task Force Mustang as part of Operation Iraqi Freedom and also in June 2011 as a part of Task Force Nomad in support of Operation New Dawn. The battalion currently flies UH-60 Blackhawk aircraft. It is home based at Dannelly Field, Alabama, and Mobile, Alabama as part of the Alabama Army National Guard 122d Troop Command.

In 2006 the battalion was made up as follows:

- HHC – Headquarters and Headquarters Company "Palehorse"
- Company A – "Death's Angels" – UH-60 Blackhawk – Flight Company – Hope Hull, AL
- Company B – "Mobile Mafia" – UH-60 Blackhawk - Flight Company – Mobile, AL
- Company C – "Killdevils" – UH-60 Blackhawk - Flight Company, (North Carolina Army National Guard).
- Company D – "Ghostriders" – Aviation Maintenance Company – Hope Hull, AL
- Company E – "Diamondbacks" - Forward Support Company - Hope Hull, AL

After several months of Theater Immersion Training at Fort Hood, Texas and Fort Sill, Oklahoma, the composite battalion deploying to Iraq were certified "Fit to Fight" by Lt. Gen. Russel L. Honoré, commanding general, First U.S. Army, on 30 July 2006. The unit shipped to Kuwait in late summer 2006, completed "boots on the ground" training at Camp Buehring, and entered Iraq in September as one of five battalions of Task Force Mustang in support of Operation Iraqi Freedom. The battalion principally flew out of Balad Air Base (AKA) Camp Anaconda) and flew missions all over Iraq.

As a unit of Task Force Mustang, the 1st Battalion 131st Aviation consisted primarily of Alabama Army National Guard personnel, but also includes Army aviation guard personnel from additional states including an entire company from Arkansas.

Whilst in Iraq their command chain included Combat Aviation Brigade, 36th Infantry Division
4th Infantry Division
III Corps (United States).
