= 648th Maneuver Enhancement Brigade =

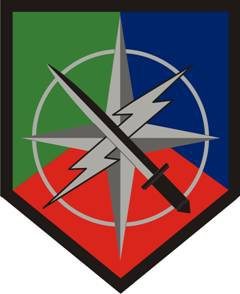
- 648th Maneuver Enhancement Brigade emblem
- Active: October 2007 - Present
- Country: United States
- Branch: United States Army National Guard
- Role: Maneuver Enhancement
- Part of: Georgia Army National Guard
- Garrison/HQ: Fort Benning, Georgia
- Nickname: Hydra
- Motto: "Freedom to Maneuver"
- Decorations: Meritorious Unit Commendation
- Battle honours: Operation Enduring Freedom

Commanders
- Current commander: COL Kris Marshall
- Command Sergeant Major: CSM Rodney Bettis

Insignia
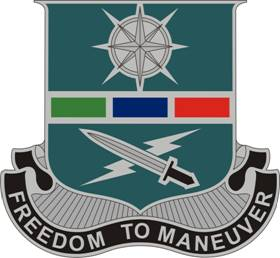
- 648th Maneuver Enhancement Brigade DUI

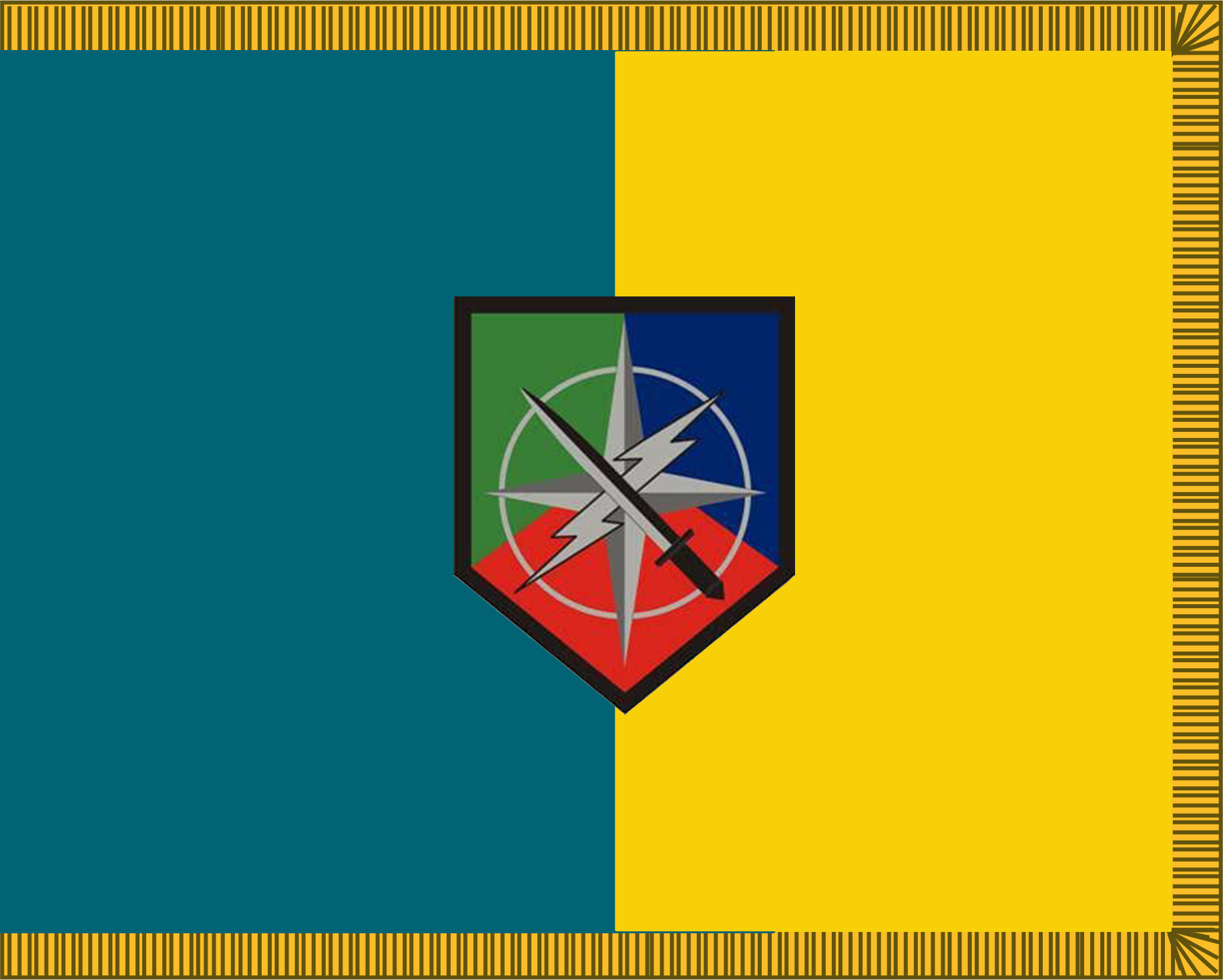
- 648th Maneuver Enhancement Brigade Flag

The 648th Maneuver Enhancement Brigade is a major subordinate command of the Georgia Army National Guard.

== History ==
The 648th MEB started with an initial staffing of just 12 personnel, a headquarters company, the 348th Brigade Support Battalion, home-stationed in Ellenwood, Georgia, and the 620th Signal Company, stationed in Weston, WV. Since its activation, the brigade added Augusta's 878th Engineer Battalion and Elberton's 1st Battalion, 214th Field Artillery Regiment.

During deployments to the War in Iraq (2003-2010) and the War in Afghanistan (2001–2021), the brigade's force structure included elements from Marietta's 248th Medical Company and Georgia's military police and engineer battalions. At its peak deployed strength, the brigade's commanded approximately 3,000 personnel from five battalions.

On August 8, 2010, the unit changed command for the first time. Colonel Keith Knowlton, turned over the unit to his successor, Colonel Andy Hall. Colonel Hall led the Brigade headquarters during its deployment to Kabul, Afghanistan in 2012. Prior to the unit's deployment, the 170th Military Police Battalion and the 1st Battalion, 214th Field Artillery Regiment were transferred to the 78th Troop Command.

On March 16, 2013, the unit again changed command and Colonel Randal Scott Carter became the third commander of the 648th MEB and Command Sergeant Major John Scott Rainwater took responsibility of the brigade as the fourth Senior Enlisted Adviser in the brigade's history.

The brigade has an authorized strength of over 1,600 Soldiers and has enduring training and support relationships with 2nd Infantry Division (United States) in Korea and III Corps (United States) at Fort Hood, Texas.

== Mission ==
The mission of the 648th Maneuver Enhancement Brigade (MEB) is to provide manned, ready, and fully equipped mission-capable units to the Governor of the State of Georgia and to combatant and joint task force commanders to conduct support area operations, maneuver support operations, and support to consequence management and stability operations in order to assure the mobility, protection, and freedom of action of the supported force.

== Deployments ==
2009: the 810th Engineer Company deployed to Afghanistan in support of Operation Enduring Freedom, clearing routes so coalition units could complete their missions unharmed and on time.

2010: the 190th Military Police Company deployed to Bagram Air Base near Kabul, Afghanistan. The company's primary job was to provide security for the base detention center along its guard towers and various entry control points. The unit later picked up the additional task of escorting detainees to and from the center; and the 190th served as part of the base's immediate response force, protecting the area in which it resided in the event of an attack.

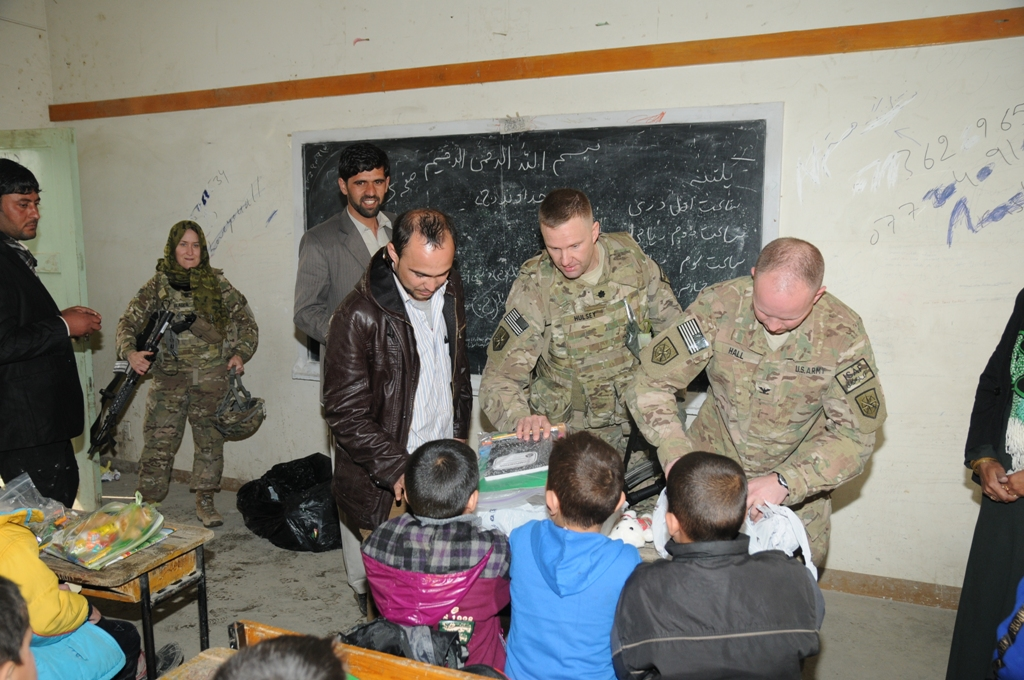
Members of Task Force Hydra giving bags of school supplies to a local school

2011: the 877th Engineer Company deployed to Afghanistan in support of Operation Enduring Freedom. Upon their redeployment in 2012, they moved from under the 878th Engineer Battalion to 78th Troop Command.

2012: The 648th MEB Headquarters Company deployed to Kabul, Afghanistan as Task Force Hydra. During pre-deployment training, the brigade's organic network signal company, the 620th Signal Company (WVARNG), fully participated in a regional training exercise at Camp Blanding, FL. Task Force Hydra was responsible for the Kabul Base Cluster, providing mission command, security and support operations for the nearly 9,000 U.S. and coalition forces operating in the capital region. They provided Garrison Command, CERP missions, Police Assistance Teams and construction management for the Kabul region.

The 878th Engineer Battalion headquarters and the 848th Engineer Company (Sapper) deployed to Kandahar, Afghanistan.

2013: the 1st Battalion 214th Field Artillery Regiment deployed to Shindand, Afghanistan as Task Force Granite. Task Force Granite was responsible for base security for Shindand Air Base. They provided Base Security Battalion Command, and carried out patrol and assessment missions, checkpoint control and flight line security for the base. Responsibility for administrative control of the 1-214 FA BN was transferred from the 78th Troop Command to the 648th in June 2013 while the artillery battalion was deployed.

2014: The 876th Engineer Company deployed to Afghanistan in support of structural maintenance and repair in bases and camps throughout Afghanistan. They are expected to redeploy home in early 2015.

== Leadership & Organization ==
Commander	Years	Command Sergeant Major	Years	Command Sergeant Major	Years
COL Keith Knowlton	2007 - 2010	CSM James Nelson	2007 - 2008	CSM Chuck Crews	2008 - 2010
COL Anthony "Andy" Hall	2010 - 2013	CSM John Smiley	2010 - 2013		
COL Randal Scott Carter	2013–2015	CSM John Scott Rainwater	2013–2014		
COL John T. Gentry Jr.	2015–2018	CSM Samuel Wade McCord	2014–2017		
COL Kevin T. Hamm	2018-2021	CSM Brandon M. Cook	2017-2019	CSM Ronald W. DeLoach	2019-2021
COL Kris Marshall	2021–Present	CSM Rodney Bettis	2021-Present		

== Organization ==
- 648th Maneuver Enhancement Brigade, at Fort Benning
  - Headquarters Support Company, at Fort Benning
  - 420th Signal Company, in Cumming
  - 3rd Infantry Division Main Command Post-Operational Detachment, at Fort Stewart
  - 1st Battalion (Infantry), 54th Security Force Assistance Brigade, at Fort Benning
    - Headquarters Support Company, 1st Battalion (Infantry), 54th Security Force Assistance Brigade, at Fort Benning
    - Company A, 1st Battalion (Infantry), 54th Security Force Assistance Brigade, at Fort Benning
    - Company B, 1st Battalion (Infantry), 54th Security Force Assistance Brigade, at Fort Benning
    - Company C, 1st Battalion (Infantry), 54th Security Force Assistance Brigade, at Fort Benning
  - 1st Battalion, 214th Field Artillery Regiment, in Elberton (M109A6 Paladin) (part of 130th Field Artillery Brigade)
    - Headquarters and Headquarters Battery, 1st Battalion, 214th Field Artillery Regiment, in Elberton
    - Battery A, 1st Battalion, 214th Field Artillery Regiment, in Hartwell
    - Battery B, 1st Battalion, 214th Field Artillery Regiment, in Thomson
    - Battery C, 1st Battalion, 214th Field Artillery Regiment, in Ellenwood
    - 1214th Forward Support Company, in Washington
  - 878th Engineer Battalion, in Augusta
    - Headquarters and Headquarters Company, 878th Engineer Battalion, in Augusta
    - Forward Support Company, 878th Engineer Battalion, in Augusta
    - 177th Engineer Company (Topographic), at Fulton County Airport
    - 848th Engineer Company (Sapper), in Douglasville
    - 863rd Engineer Detachment (Utilities ), in Toccoa
    - 874th Engineer Detachment (Utilities ), in Toccoa
    - 876th Engineer Company (Engineer Support Company), in Columbus
    - 877th Engineer Company (Engineer Construction Company), in Augusta

== Campaign Streamers and Unit Awards ==
Conflict	Streamer	Period
	Transition I	2012-2013
Ribbon	Award	Period
Embroidered "Afghanistan 2012-2013"	Meritorious Unit Commendation (Army)	2012-2013
