= Alabama Military Department =

Government agency in Alabama, United States

Agency overview
- Jurisdiction: Alabama
- Headquarters: Montgomery, Alabama; 32.406224°N 86.2639714°W
- Employees: 9,640 (Army National Guard); 2,246 (Air National Guard)
- Annual budget: $130,527,235 (2018)
- Agency executive: Major General Sheryl E. Gordon
- Child agencies: Alabama Army National Guard; Alabama Air National Guard; Alabama State Defense Force

The Alabama Military Department is an executive department within the government of Alabama. The military department is responsible for managing the military forces of Alabama, including the Alabama Army National Guard, the Alabama Air National Guard, and the Alabama State Defense Force.

== Alabama Army National Guard ==
The Alabama Army National Guard exists as both a reserve force which augments the United States Army, and as a state militia which answers to the Governor of Alabama. The Alabama Army National Guard maintains 141 armories across the state.

== Alabama Air National Guard ==
The Alabama Air National Guard exists as both a reserve force which augments the United States Air Force, and as a state militia which answers to the Governor of Alabama. The Alabama Air National Guard provides mission ready forces to the federal government and the Governor of Alabama, while providing assistance to the citizens and civil authorities during natural disasters or emergencies under the command of the Adjutant General.

== Alabama State Defense Force ==
The Alabama State Defense Force is the state defense force of Alabama and is responsible for executing the Alabama National Guard's duties whenever the National Guard is in federal service. As of 2026, the Alabama State Defense Force is inactive pending reorganization.

== See also ==
- Alabama Department of Homeland Security
