= Alabama State Defense Force =

State-provided guard for Alabama

- Active: 1940–1945; 1980–present
- Country: United States
- Allegiance: Alabama
- Type: State defense force
- Size: 1,000 legally authorized
- Part of: Alabama Military Department
- Garrison/HQ: Fort Taylor Harden Armory, Montgomery, Alabama
- Website: sdf.alabama.gov

Commanders
- Commander in Chief: Gov. Kay Ivey
- Adjutant General: MG David K. Pritchett
- Commander: BG (AL) Robert Clark

The Alabama State Defense Force (ASDF) is the state defense force of Alabama, allowed by the Constitution of Alabama, federal law, the Code of Alabama, and Executive Order. It has an authorized strength of 1,000 members and is organized on the United States Army structural pattern. The ASDF is under the control of the Governor of Alabama, as the state's Commander in Chief, and comes under the authority of The Adjutant General (TAG) of Alabama. The ASDF is an adjunct, volunteer, augmenting force to the Alabama National Guard. Currently, the ASDF is inactive awaiting reorganization by the Alabama National Guard. The organization has renamed itself to the Alabama Service Corps, a nonprofit organization that carries on the State Defense Force mission until reactivated.

== History ==
=== Origins ===
Prior to the modern National Guard, states would provide volunteer militia units to augment the federal army in times of war. In the Mexican–American War, Alabama provided the United States with multiple units of Alabama militia, with most serving for less than a year.

During the American Civil War, both Union units and Confederate units were raised in support of the war effort.

In the Spanish–American War, Alabama raised three volunteer infantry units.

=== 20th century ===
After the declaration of World War II, the majority of the National Guard was mobilized, leaving governors without troops to guard against invasion, provide disaster relief, and protect against civil unrest. Therefore, many states, including Alabama, raised state defense forces to act as a replacement for the National Guard during the war. In 1940, Governor Frank M. Dixon created the Alabama State Guard, recruiting primarily from World War I veterans in the American Legion. Alabama took a unique approach in creating its state defense force. While other states actively recruited from veteran's organizations, Alabama went a step further and "gave the American Legion of Alabama the responsibility for creating and running its State Guard," and in return, Alabama "was able to achieve a functioning state guard sooner than most states." By using an existing private organization as the framework for their state defense force, Alabama was able to achieve full readiness far sooner than might be expected. At the war's end, the Alabama State Guard was deactivated.

On December 22, 1983, Governor George Wallace signed Executive Order Number 20, which authorized the creation of the Alabama State Defense Force, the successor of the Alabama State Guard which was disbanded in World War II.

=== 21st century ===
Before the start of the United States invasion of Afghanistan in 2001, the Alabama State Defense Force began training at Fort McClellan to serve as stateside replacements for deploying units. In 2008, members delivered meals and water to Hurricane Gustav evacuees. On August 14, 2012, Governor Robert Bentley signed into law the Alabama State Defense Force bill (SB278), which added clarification to the role of the ASDF in relation to the Alabama National Guard, so that the two organizations can be better integrated in future stateside missions. As recently as April 2013, the ASDF was still seeking applicants, but as of November 2013, it was stood down from active status. While not abolished or disbanded, the ASDF was placed in inactive status while "the future structure, mission and manning of ASDF are determined." As of June 2022, the state of Alabama was still issuing Alabama State Defense Force license plates to its active and inactive members.

After the Alabama State Defense Force was shifted to inactive status, some of its members formed the Alabama Volunteers as a private organization organized under the Alabama State Defense Force Association, in order to continue their volunteer service in disaster relief efforts until the ALSDF is reactivated. In Southern Alabama, the U.S. National Reserve Corps was started with members from the ASDF, this national organization also consists of volunteers dedicated to service in disaster relief efforts and participated with the Red Cross in 2014 in damage assessment in Baldwin County.

As of January 2025, over 11 years since the temporary suspension began, the state of Alabama has not yet finished its reorganization of the Alabama State Defense Force.

== Mission ==
The mission of the Alabama State Defense Force is to on order of the Adjutant General of Alabama provide trained and ready volunteer individuals and units to support the National Guard conducting Defense Support to Civil Authorities missions to mitigate and/or alleviate the effects of a natural or man-made disaster.

== Organization ==
The ASDF is headquartered in Montgomery, Alabama. The ASDF has three operational Brigades.

== Awards and decorations ==
The Alabama State Defense Force issues several ribbons to guardsmen who have merited them, including the following ribbons:

- ASDF Alabama War Ribbon
- ASDF Distinguished Service Ribbon
- ASDF Meritorious Service Ribbon
- ASDF Commendation Ribbon
- ASDF Achievement Ribbon (Officer)
- ASDF Achievement Ribbon (Enlisted)
- ASDF Merit Ribbon
- ASDF Desert Shield/Storm Support Ribbon
- ASDF Disaster Readiness Ribbon
- SGT Dixie Club-Gold Ribbon
- SGT Dixie Club-Silver Ribbon
- SGT Dixie Club-Bronze Ribbon
- ASDF Service Ribbon
- ASDF Distinguished Graduate Ribbon
- ASDF Professional Development Ribbon
- ASDF Officer Training Ribbon
- ASDF Warrant Officer Training Ribbon
- ASDF NCO Training Ribbon
- ASDF C.E.R.T. Ribbon
- ASDF Recruiting Ribbon
- ASDF Super Recruiter Recruiting Ribbon
- ASDF Association Member Ribbon
- ASDF SGAUS Ribbon
- ASDF Outstanding Unit Comm. Ribbon
- SGAUS Superior Unit Citation
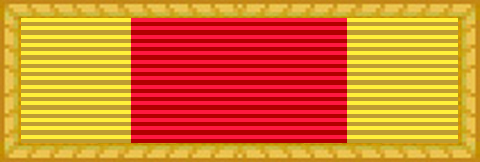
- MEMS Academy Unit Citation

== See also ==
- Alabama Wing Civil Air Patrol
