= 1204th Aviation Support Battalion =

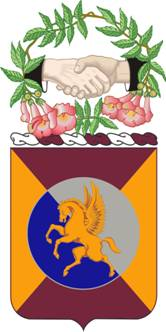
- 1204th Aviation Support Bn unit insignia
- Disbanded: 10 January 2016
- Country: United States
- Branch: Army
- Type: Aviation Support
- Part of: Kentucky Army National Guard
- Motto: "Wings of Thunder"
- Decorations: Meritorious Unit Commendation

The 1204th Aviation Support Battalion (ASB) is a unit in the Kentucky Army National Guard that was inactivated January 10, 2016. The unit deployed to Iraq in support of Operation New Dawn (Iraq, 2010–2011) on October 1, 2011.

== Service in Iraq ==
Following arrival for Iraq War service and the uncasing of the colors on November 3, 2011, the battalion quickly began work, assuming the responsibility of aviation logistics sustainment and support operations from Contingency Operating Site Taji, while simultaneously planning for the withdrawal of the Combat Aviation Brigade, 29th Infantry Division.

The unit earned the Meritorious Unit Commendation for operational service in Iraq from August 23, 2011, to August 10, 2012, during the unit's Operation Enduring Freedom/Operation New Dawn deployment.
