= 348th Brigade Support Battalion (United States) =

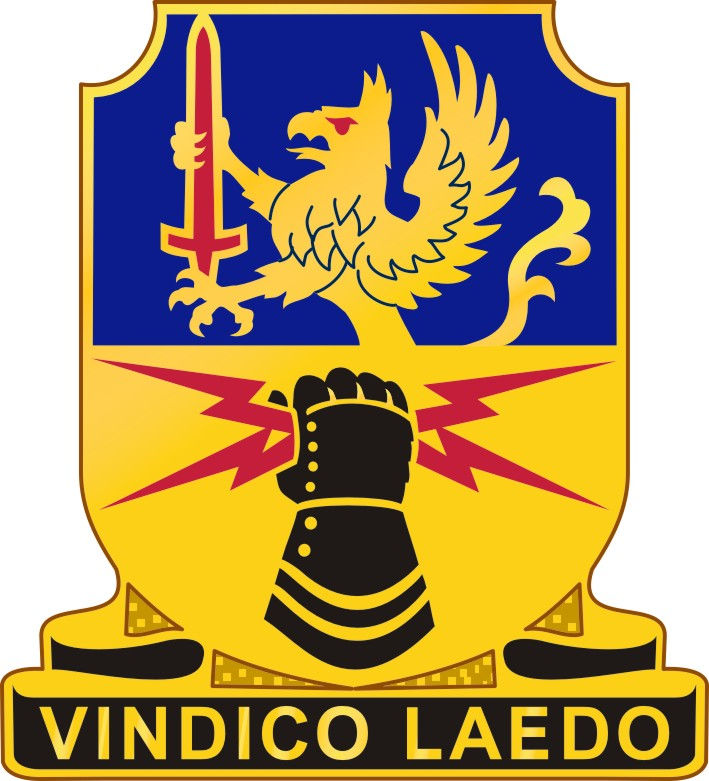
- Distinctive unit insignia
- Active: October 2009–Present
- Country: United States
- Branch: Georgia Army National Guard
- Role: Logistics Support
- Size: Battalion
- Garrison/HQ: Ellenwood, Georgia
- Engagements: Civil War; World War I World War II

Commanders
- Current commander: LTC John G. Lowe
- Command Sergeant Major: CSM Ronald Deloach

Insignia
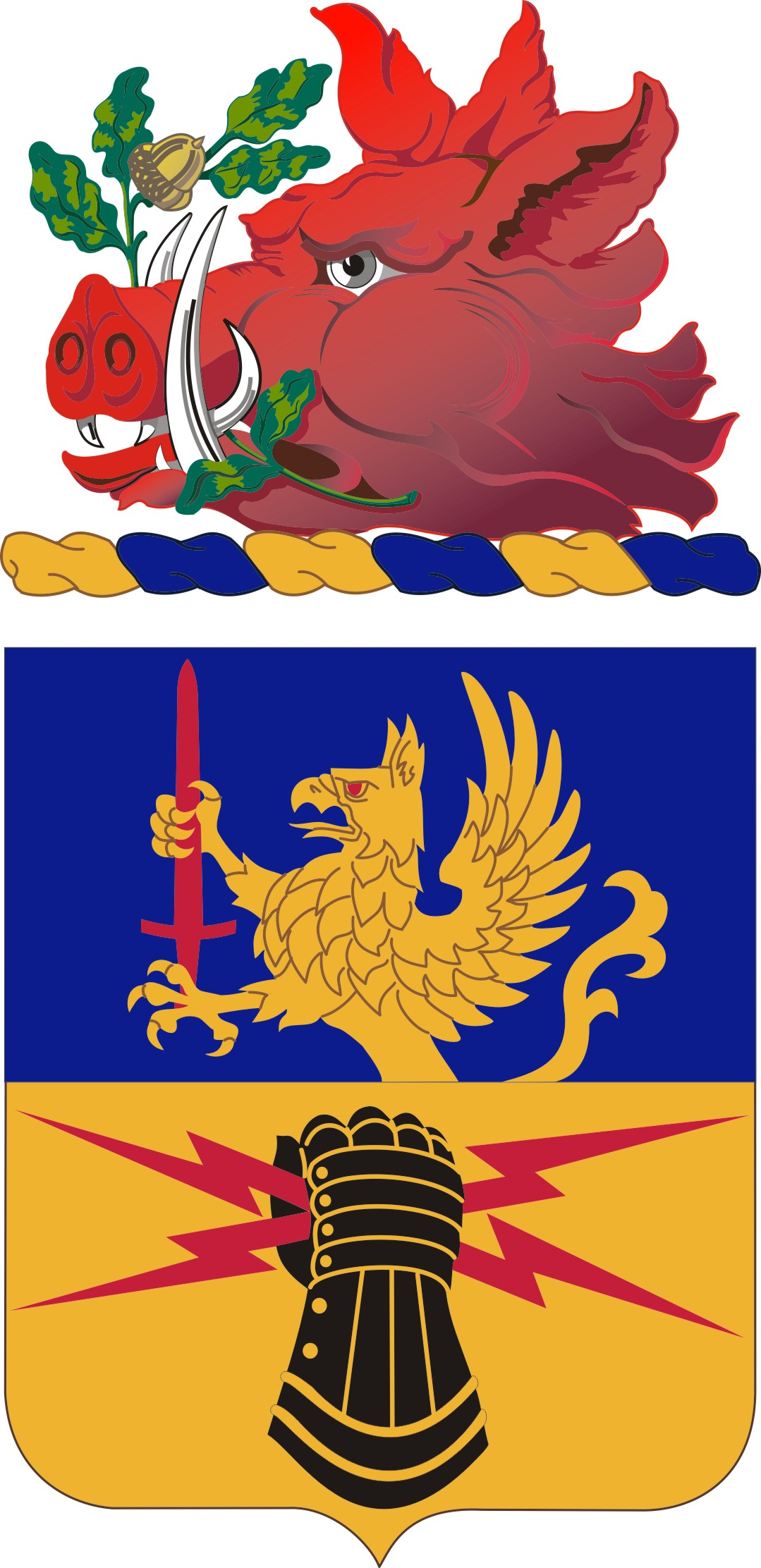
- Coat of Arms

The 348th Brigade Support Battalion (348th BSB) is a brigade support battalion of the United States Army. It provides direct support level logistics to the 648th Maneuver Enhancement Brigade (648th MEB).

== History ==
The 348th Brigade Support Battalion was constituted 1 September 2009 in the Georgia Army National Guard as the 348th Support Battalion and was organized 3 June 2010 from new and existing elements, with headquarters at Cumming, Georgia.

== Leadership and organization ==
CDR	Years	CSM	Years
LTC Charles Lewis	2009–2010	CSM Charles Christenbury	2009–2010
LTC Reginald L. Cook	2010–2012	CSM Charles Christenbury	2010–2010
		CSM Jackie Faulkner	2010–2011
		CSM Ed Andrews	2011–2012
LTC Michael O. Hulsey	2012–2014	CSM Ed Andrews	2012–2013
		CSM Randy Cowan	2013–2014
LTC Thomas C. Meeks	2014–Present	CSM Randy Cowan	2014–Present

=== Organization ===
Headquarters and Headquarters Company (HHC) – located in Ellenwood, GA provides mission command for organic and attached units assigned to the Brigade Support Battalion (BSB).
Alpha Company (Distribution) – Ellenwood, GA provides transportation and supply support to the 648th Maneuver Enhancement Brigade (648th MEB).

Constituted 1 September 2009 in the Georgia Army National Guard, and organized 3 June 2010 from new and existing elements, with Headquarters at Cumming.

Bravo Company (Maintenance) – Hinesville, GA provides field level maintenance support to the 648th Maneuver Enhancement Brigade (648th MEB) and attached units.

== Lineage and honors ==
=== Campaign participation credit ===
Company B (Liberty Independent Troop-Hinesville) entitled to:

Date	Campaign	Location
–	Civil War (Confederate)	Atlanta, Georgia
1862	Civil War (Confederate)	South Carolina
1863	Civil War (Confederate)	South Carolina
1864	Civil War (Confederate)	Florida
1865	Civil War (Confederate)	North Carolina
–	World War I	–
–	World War II	East Indies
–	World War II	Papua
–	World War II	New Guinea
–	World War II	Luzon

=== Awards and decorations ===
Company B (Liberty Independent Troop – Hinesville), entitled to:

1. Presidential Unit Citation (Army), Streamer embroidered PAPUA
2. Philippine Presidential Unit Citation, Streamer embroidered 17 OCTOBER 1944 TO 4 JULY 1945
