= 2021 deaths in American television =

The following deaths of notable individuals related to American television occurred in 2021.

== January ==
Date	Name	Age	Notability	Source
January 2	Kerry Vincent	75	Australian baker and reality show contestant (The Best Thing I Ever Ate, Food Network Challenge, and Last Cake Standing)	
January 3	Eric Jerome Dickey	59	Author and former actor. Recurring role on Almost There!	
January 4	Tanya Roberts	65	Actress best known as Midge Pinciotti on That '70s Show. Also recurring roles on Charlie's Angels and Hot Line.	
January 4	Gregory Sierra	83	Actor best known as Detective Sergeant Chano Amengual on Barney Miller and as Julio Fuentes on Sanford and Son.	
January 6	Gerald Hiken	93	Character actor. Had a short recurring role on Car 54, Where Are You	
January 6	Antonio Sabàto Sr.	77	Italian-American actor, father of Antonio Sabàto Jr.; appeared as "Aldo Damiano" on The Bold and the Beautiful in 2006.	
January 7	Michael Apted	79	British director, producer, writer and actor (Rome, Ray Donovan, Masters of Sex)	
January 7	Deezer D	55	Actor and rapper best known as Malik McGrath on ER.	
January 7	Tommy Lasorda	93	Hall of Fame manager of the Los Angeles Dodgers from 1976 to 1996; co-starred as the "Dugout Wizard" on The Baseball Bunch from 1980 to 1985, and later appeared in TV commercials for SlimFast	
January 7	Marion Ramsey	73	Actress (Cos). Guest starred on K-Ville, Loving, and Another World.	
January 7	Val Bettin	97	Actor and voice actor.	
January 8	Ed Bruce	81	Country music songwriter, singer, and actor (Bret Maverick). Made guest roles on Happy Days, The Oprah Winfrey Show, Sally, Laverne & Shirley, The Brady Bunch, I Love Lucy, and The Munsters.	
January 8	Diana Millay	85	Actress (Father Knows Best, The Many Loves of Dobie Gillis, The Tab Hunter Show, Bonanza, Gunsmoke, Route 66, King of Diamonds, Target: The Corruptors!, The United States Steel Hour, Rawhide, Perry Mason, Dark Shadows)	
January 8	Mike Henry	84	Football player (Pittsburgh Steelers and Los Angeles Rams) and actor (M*A*S*H, General Hospital, I Dream of Jeannie, Bewitched, Murder, She Wrote, Fantasy Island)	
January 9	John Reilly	86	Actor best known for roles on the soap operas General Hospital and Passions	
January 9	Caroly Wilcox	89	Theater professional, best known for her work with The Muppets on television programs including Sesame Street, The Muppet Show, and Fraggle Rock	
January 14	Peter Mark Richman	93	Actor best known as Andrew Laird on Dynasty.	
January 15	Dale Baer	70	Animator (Disney)	
January 16	Jim MacGeorge	92	Voice actor and writer (Laurel and Hardy, The Funky Phantom, The New Scooby-Doo Movies, Clue Club, Yogi's Space Race, Captain Caveman and the Teen Angels, The Ri¢hie Ri¢h/Scooby-Doo Show, The Kwicky Koala Show, DuckTales, Bionic Six, Foofur, Beany and Cecil)	
January 18	David Richardson	65	Writer and producer, most known for work on The John Larroquette Show, Two and a Half Men, and F Is for Family	
January 18	Don Sutton	75	Hall of Fame baseball pitcher and TV announcer for the Atlanta Braves and Washington Nationals	
January 19	Mark Wilson	91	Magician and author, who was widely credited as the first major television magician and in the process establishing the viability of illusion shows as a television format.	
January 20	Mira Furlan	65	Croatian actress and singer best known as Delenn on Babylon 5 and as Danielle Rousseau on Lost.	
January 21	Marty Brill	88	Comedian, writer, actor and musician. Guest roles included Guiding Light, Transformers: Rescue Bots, Chicago Fire, Back to the Future, Captain N: The Game Master, Transformers: Rescue Bots Academy.	
January 21	Donna Britt	62	News anchor at WAFB/Baton Rouge, Louisiana, from 1981 to 2018	
January 22	Hank Aaron	86	Professional baseball player (played himself on Happy Days, MacGyver, Mr. Belvedere, Touched by an Angel and Futurama)	
January 22	Ron Campbell	81	Australian animator, director, producer and storyboard artist (Krazy Kat, The Beatles, Sesame Street, The New Scooby-Doo Movies, The Amazing Chan and the Chan Clan, The Big Blue Marble, ABC Weekend Special, Yogi's Space Race, The Smurfs, The Scooby & Scrappy-Doo/Puppy Hour, Pac-Man, The Dukes, Snorks, Yogi's Treasure Hunt, Paw Paws, The Jetsons, Ghostbusters (1986), Bionic Six, DuckTales, The New Adventures of Winnie the Pooh, Police Academy, Camp Candy, Bobby's World, Rugrats, Darkwing Duck, James Bond Jr., Bonkers, Duckman, Aaahh!!! Real Monsters, Ed, Edd n Eddy, Rocket Power, Dragon Tales)	
January 23	Hal Holbrook	95	Actor (several TV roles, including the series The Bold Ones: The Senator, Designing Women, and Evening Shade, and films and specials including That Certain Summer, Mark Twain Tonight! and 1977's Our Town)	
January 23	Larry King	87	Radio/TV broadcaster and host of Larry King Live on CNN and Larry King Now on Hulu and RT America	
January 24	Sonny Fox	95	Host of The $64,000 Challenge (1956) and Wonderama (1959–1967)	
January 24	Bruce Kirby	95	Actor best known as Sergeant George Kramer on Columbo and as Bruce Rogoff on L.A. Law. Also recurring roles on numerous shows. Guest roles included As the World Turns, The Bold and the Beautiful, Days of Our Lives, General Hospital, Guiding Light, All That, Let's Make a Deal, The Young and the Restless, Bewitched, I Dream of Jeannie, and The Lucy–Desi Comedy Hour.	
January 26	Cloris Leachman	94	Actress best known as Phyllis Lindstrom on The Mary Tyler Moore Show and its spinoff Phyllis. Also recurring roles and guest spots on numerous shows. Three-time Emmy winner.	
January 26	Sekou Smith	48	Reporter and analyst for NBA TV	
January 28	Cicely Tyson	96	Actress and fashion model best known as Jane Foster on East Side/West Side, as Carrie Grace Battle on Sweet Justice, and as Ophelia Harkness on How to Get Away With Murder.	
January 30	Allan Burns	85	Writer and producer (The Mary Tyler Moore Show, My Mother the Car, The Munsters, Rhoda, and Lou Grant)	
January 30	Marc Wilmore	57	Writer, actor, and producer (In Living Color, The Tonight Show with Jay Leno, The PJs, The Simpsons, and F Is for Family); brother of Larry Wilmore.	

== February ==
Date	Name	Age	Notability	Source
February 1	Dustin Diamond	44	Actor best known as Samuel "Screech" Powers in the Saved by the Bell franchise	
February 1	Jamie Tarses	56	Television executive (ABC Entertainment) and producer (Friends, Frasier, Happy Endings, My Boys, Franklin & Bash, The Wilds, Saturday Night Live, Perfect Strangers, Hawthorne, Studio 60 on the Sunset Strip, Marry Me, Men at Work)	
February 5	Christopher Plummer	91	Canadian Emmy, Oscar, and Tony Award-winning actor (TV credits include Omnibus, The Moneychangers, Jesus of Nazareth, Little Gloria... Happy at Last, The Thorn Birds, The Cosby Show, Counterstrike, Winchell, Nuremberg, American Tragedy, Departure, and Muhammad Ali's Greatest Fight; voice work on Madeline; video clue presenter on Jeopardy! The Greatest of All Time)	
February 5	Butch Reed	66	Former WWE and WCW professional wrestler	
February 7	Pedro Gomez	58	Sports journalist who primarily covered baseball for ESPN, appearing on SportsCenter and Baseball Tonight	
February 10	Katherine Creag	47	Newscaster at WNYW and WNBC in New York City	
February 11	Joan Weldon	90	Character actress (guest spots on The Millionaire, Lux Video Theater, Perry Mason, Have Gun-Will Travel, Shirley Temple Theater, and This Is Your Music).	
February 12	Christopher Pennock	76	Actor best known as Gabriel Collins on Dark Shadows	
February 12	Phyllis Cicero	61	Actress, known for role as Stella the Storyteller in Barney & Friends	
February 12	Lynn Stalmaster	93	Casting director	
February 17	Rush Limbaugh	70	Radio and TV personality and political commentator; TV work included eponymous Rush Limbaugh from 1992 to 1996, along with contributions to The 1/2 Hour News Hour and Sunday NFL Countdown. Also several voice appearances as himself on Family Guy.	
February 18	Frank Lupo	66	Writer/producer, most notably (in partnership with Stephen J. Cannell) on The A-Team, Hunter and Wiseguy	
February 20	Douglas Turner Ward	90	Playwright, actor, director, and theatrical producer. He was noted for being a founder and artistic director of the Negro Ensemble Company (NEC).	
February 23	Geoffrey Scott	79	Actor best known as Mark Jennings on Dynasty	
February 28	Irv Cross	81	Football player (Philadelphia Eagles, Los Angeles Rams) and sportscaster (The NFL Today). First Black network sports anchor.	

== March ==
Date	Name	Age	Notability	Source
March 2	Gil Rogers	87	Actor (recurring roles as Hawk Shayne on Guiding Light, Ray Gardner on All My Children, and Dr. Martin Brandt on The Doctors).	
March 6	Carmel Quinn	95	Irish-American entertainer who appeared on Broadway, television and radio after immigrating to the United States in 1954	
March 9	Roger Mudd	93	Reporter and anchor for CBS News and NBC News as well for PBS' MacNeil/Lehrer NewsHour and History Channel	
March 9	Cliff Simon	58	Actor best known for his role as Ba'al on Stargate SG-1.	
March 13	Yaphet Kotto	81	Actor best known for his role as Lt. Al Giardello on Homicide: Life on the Street	
March 14	Henry Darrow	87	Puerto Rican actor (several series, including The High Chaparral, Harry O, All My Children, One Life to Live, Santa Barbara, General Hospital, and Zorro)	
March 17	Amy Johnston	66	Film and television actress and drama coach	
March 18	Richard Gilliland	71	Actor (several series, most notably McMillan, Operation Petticoat, and Designing Women)	
March 19	Barry Orton	62	Actor and professional wrestler, son of professional wrestler Bob Orton	
March 21	Joel Steiger	79	Writer/producer (several films and shows, most notably Matlock, Jake and the Fatman, and the Perry Mason film series)	
March 23	George Segal	87	Actor best known as Albert 'Pops' Solomon on The Goldbergs and Jack Gallo on Just Shoot Me!	
March 24	Craig "muMs" Grant	52	Actor/poet (various TV series, most notably Oz, She's Gotta Have It, and Hightown)	
March 24	Jessica Walter	80	Actress (voice roles included Archer and Dinosaurs, on-camera roles included Arrested Development among several others)	
March 25	Rick Azar	91	Sportscaster best known for his 31 years with WKBW-TV in Buffalo, New York	
March 25	Robert Rodan	83	Actor best known for his role of Adam in Dark Shadows in 1968	

== April ==
Date	Name	Age	Notability	Source
April 1	Lee Aaker	77	Actor best known as Rusty on The Adventures of Rin Tin Tin	
April 3	Gloria Henry	98	Actress best known as Alice Mitchell on Dennis the Menace	
April 3	John Paragon	66	Actor/voice actor best known for playing Jambi the Genie and voicing Pterri the Pterodactyl on Pee-wee's Playhouse	
April 6	Walter Olkewicz	72	Character actor (The Last Resort, Barney Miller, The Blue and the Gray, Wizards and Warriors, Taxi, Partners in Crime, Family Ties, Dolly, Mr. Belvedere, Twin Peaks, Who's the Boss?, Night Court, Batman: The Animated Series, Grace Under Fire)	
April 7	Anne Beatts	74	Comedy writer, best known for Saturday Night Live and Square Pegs	
April 7	James Hampton	84	Actor, television director, and screenwriter (Gunsmoke, F Troop, The Doris Day Show, Love, American Style, The Red Hand Gang, The Dukes of Hazzard, Insight, Maggie, Teen Wolf, Days of Our Lives, Full House)	
April 16	Felix Silla	84	Italian actor and stuntman (Cousin Itt on The Addams Family)	
April 18	Sunday Burquest	50	Reality TV contestant (Survivor: Millennials vs. Gen X)	
April 18	Alma Wahlberg	78	Reality television personality (Wahlburgers) and the mother of Donnie, Mark, Paul, and Robert Wahlberg.	
April 19	Walter Mondale	93	Politician, Vice President (1977–1981) who participated in the 1976 and 1984 presidential debates.	
April 21	Bernie Kahn	90	Screenwriter (Petticoat Junction, Get Smart, The Second Hundred, My World and Welcome to It, The Good Life, Love, American Style, Bewitched, Room 222, Super Friends, Viva Valdez, The Practice, Tabitha, Three's Company, The Love Boat, The New Addams Family)	
April 22	Charles Fries	92	Film producer, television producer, and executive producer who worked on many TV series, made-for-TV movies, and theatrical films	
April 23	Nathan Jung	74	Actor and stuntman (guest roles on The A-Team and Falcon Crest)	
April 26	Al Schmitt	91	Recording engineer and record producer	
April 29	Martin Bookspan	94	Announcer, commentator, and author. Was the announcer on the PBS series Live from Lincoln Center from its beginnings in 1976 until his retirement in 2006.	
April 29	Johnny Crawford	75	Actor, singer, and musician best known for his role of Mark McCain in The Rifleman (other roles include The Lone Ranger, The Loretta Young Show, Whirlybirds, NBC Matinee Theater, The Adventures of William Tell)	
April 29	Billie Hayes	96	Actress best known for her comic portrayals of Witchiepoo in H.R. Pufnstuf	
April 29	Frank McRae	80	Actor and professional football player.	

== May ==
Date	Name	Age	Notability	Source
May 1	Olympia Dukakis	89	Actress, director, producer, teacher, and activist (Search for Tomorrow, Tales of the City, Touched by an Angel, Center of the Universe, Bored to Death, Sex & Violence, Forgive Me, TripTank)	
May 2	Bob Abernethy	93	Journalist, best known for serving various roles during a 42-year career with NBC News. He later co-created, and was executive editor and host of Religion & Ethics Newsweekly, which aired on PBS from 1997 until 2017.	
May 7	Ernest Angley	99	Televangelist (host of The Ernest Angley Hour) and station owner (WBNX-TV/Akron, OH)	
May 7	Tawny Kitaen	59	Actress, comedian, and media personality, best known for her appearances in several Whitesnake music videos. Also the host of America's Funniest People; recurring roles on The New WKRP in Cincinnati and Hercules: The Legendary Journeys; and appearances in the reality shows The Surreal Life, Botched, and Celebrity Rehab with Dr. Drew.	
May 11	Norman Lloyd	106	Actor (most notably Dr. Daniel Auschlander on St. Elsewhere) and producer (Alfred Hitchcock Presents)	
May 14	Jay Barbree	87	Correspondent for NBC News, focusing on space travel. He was the only journalist to have covered every non-commercial human space mission in the United States until 2011.	
May 14	New Jack	58	Professional wrestler (most notably with Extreme Championship Wrestling)	
May 18	Charles Grodin	86	Actor (main role as the second Matt Crane Stevens on The Young Marrieds; recurring role on Louie; and appearances in the mini-series Madoff and Fresno) and CBS News commentator (60 Minutes II)	
May 19	Paul Mooney	79	Actor, comedian, and writer (Real Husbands of Hollywood, Chappelle's Show, The Larry Sanders Show, In Living Color, Pryor's Place, The Richard Pryor Show, Saturday Night Live, Good Times, Sanford and Son).	
May 24	Samuel E. Wright	74	Voice actor best known as Sebastian the Crab on The Little Mermaid.	
May 26	Paul Soles	90	Canadian voice actor best known as the voice of Hermey in Rudolph the Red-Nosed Reindeer and the title character in the 1960s version of Spider-Man	
May 29	Gavin MacLeod	90	Actor best known as Murray Slaughter on The Mary Tyler Moore Show, Captain Merrill Stubing on The Love Boat, and Seaman Joseph "Happy" Hanes on McHale's Navy.	
May 29	Joe Lara	58	Actor best known as the title character in Tarzan: The Epic Adventures. Husband of Gwen Shamblin Lara, who also died in the same crash.	
May 31	Arlene Golonka	85	Actress best known as Millie Hutchins/Millie Swanson on The Andy Griffith Show and Mayberry R.F.D. (other roles include The Doctors, The Doctors and the Nurses, The Big Valley, Get Smart, That Girl, Love, American Style, The Mary Tyler Moore Show, Barnaby Jones, Maude, Mary Hartman, Mary Hartman, The Streets of San Francisco, Joe & Valerie, Fantasy Island, The Love Boat, Gimme a Break!, Growing Pains, Murder, She Wrote, Matlock, The King of Queens)	

== June ==
Date	Name	Age	Notability	Source
June 3	Ernie Lively	74	Character actor (guest spots on The Waltons, The Dukes of Hazzard, The Beverly Hillbillies, The X-Files, That '70s Show, and The West Wing).	
June 3	John Sacret Young	75	Writer/producer/director, most notably on China Beach, The West Wing and Firefly Lane	
June 4	Clarence Williams III	81	Actor, best known as Det. Linc Hayes on The Mod Squad	
June 7	Douglas S. Cramer	89	Producer (various series/miniseries including Bridget Loves Bernie, Wonder Woman, and QB VII) and studio executive (Paramount Television, Aaron Spelling Productions)	
June 7	Larry Gelman	90	Actor best known as Dr. Bernie Tupperman on The Bob Newhart Show and Vinnie on The Odd Couple (other roles include The Monkees, Maude, Kojak, Free Country, Eight Is Enough, One Day at a Time, Barney Miller, Archie Bunker's Place, Cagney & Lacey, Grand Slam, Night Court, Freakazoid!)	
June 11	John Gabriel	90	Actor best known as Seneca Beaulac on Ryan's Hope (other roles include Men of Annapolis, General Electric Theater, Hawaiian Eye, The Lawless Years, The Untouchables, 77 Sunset Strip, The Mary Tyler Moore Show, Loving, Kate & Allie, Generations, The Bold and the Beautiful, Days of Our Lives, What's New, Scooby-Doo?)	
June 12	Dennis Berry	76	American-French director (Highlander: The Series, Highlander: The Raven, Crossbow)	
June 13	Ned Beatty	83	Actor best known as Stanley Bolander on Homicide: Life on the Street and the Nick Szysznyk on Szysznyk	
June 14	Lisa Banes	65	Actress best known as Doreen Morrison on The Trials of Rosie O'Neill and Mayor Anita Massengil on Son of the Beach	
June 16	Frank Bonner	79	Actor best known as Herb Tarlek on WKRP in Cincinnati and The New WKRP in Cincinnati. Recurring role as Father Robert Hargis on Just the Ten of Us. Also directed several shows, most notably City Guys.	
June 16	Norman Powell	86	Producer (most notably on 24 and Washington: Behind Closed Doors), network executive (CBS), and director (The New Dick Van Dyke Show and others)	
June 18	Billy Fuccillo	64	Automobile dealer known for his television commercials	
June 20	Joanne Linville	93	Character actress (guest spots on Twilight Zone, Star Trek, Decoy, Alfred Hitchcock Presents, Have Gun Will Travel, Coronado 9, Checkmate, Adventures in Paradise, Empire, Gunsmoke, Dr. Kildare, Ben Casey, Route 66, The Eleventh Hour, I Spy, Bonanza, The Fugitive, The F.B.I., The Invaders, Felony Squad, Hawaii Five-O, Kojak, Colombo, The Streets of San Francisco, Nakia, Barnaby Jones, Switch, Charlie's Angels, CHiPs, Mrs. Columbo, Dynasty, L.A. Law, and Bus Stop; and the TV movies House on Greenapple Road, Secrets, The Critical List, The Users, The Right of the People, and Behind the Screen).	
June 26	John Langley	78	Reality television producer, most notably serving as creator/producer of Cops	
June 27	Alison Greenspan	48	Film/TV producer, most notably on the series For Life	
June 29	Stuart Damon	84	TV/stage actor best known for playing Alan Quartermaine on General Hospital and Port Charles	

== July ==
Date	Name	Age	Notability	Source
July 1	Philece Sampler	67	Actress known for Days of Our Lives and Another World, and voice work as Mimi Tachikawa and Cody Hida in the Digimon franchise, and older Toph Beifong on The Legend of Korra.	
July 5	Richard Donner	91	Film and television director (Wanted Dead or Alive, The Rifleman, Have Gun – Will Travel, Sam Benedict, The Twilight Zone, Mr. Novak, The Man from U.N.C.L.E., Gilligan's Island, Perry Mason, 12 O'Clock High, The Wild Wild West, The Felony Squad, Cannon, Kojak, Tales from the Crypt)	
July 6	Suzzanne Douglas	64	Actress best known as Geraldine "Jerri" Peterson on The Parent 'Hood.	
July 11	Charlie Robinson	75	Actor best known as Macintosh "Mac" Robinson on Night Court and Abe Johnson on Love & War. Also recurring roles on Love in the Time of Corona, Mom, The Guest Book, Hart of Dixie, Buddy Faro, Home Improvement, Ink, Buffalo Bill, and Flamingo Road.	
July 12	Paul Orndorff	71	WWE Hall of Fame professional wrestler	
July 16	Biz Markie	57	Rapper and DJ who frequently appeared on Yo Gabba Gabba!	
July 20	Bergen Williams	62	Actress best known as Alice Gunderson on General Hospital	
July 24	Jackie Mason	93	Actor and comedian (host of The Jackie Mason Show, frequent guest spots on The Ed Sullivan Show, recurring role as Rabbi Hyman Krustofsky on The Simpsons, and the starring role of Jackie Fisher on the short-lived sitcom Chicken Soup). Three-time Emmy winner.	
July 26	David Von Ancken	56	Director and producer (Hell on Wheels, Code Black, Californication, Tut, CSI: NY, Cold Case, Salem, The Order, The Vampire Diaries)	
July 28	Ron Popeil	86	Gadget salesman and inventor, founder of Ronco (multiple self-produced infomercials, appearances on The Weird Al Show and Late Night with Conan O'Brien)	
July 29	Tony Mendez	76	Cue card man on the Late Show with David Letterman and eponymous host of the Web series The Tony Mendez Show	
July 30	Jay Pickett	60	Actor best known for playing Frank Scanlon on Port Charles. Also played Chip Lakin on Days of Our Lives and David Harper on General Hospital; guest spots on Dexter and NCIS: Los Angeles.	
July 30	Thea White	81	Actress best known for voicing Muriel on Courage the Cowardly Dog.	

== August ==
Date	Name	Age	Notability	Source
August 4	Bobby Eaton	62	Professional wrestler	
August 6	Herbert Schlosser	95	President and CEO of NBC who oversaw the start of Saturday Night Live. Also oversaw The Midnight Special, co-founded A&E, and was involved in bringing Johnny Carson to The Tonight Show.	
August 7	Markie Post	70	Actress best known as Terri Michaels on The Fall Guy, Christine Sullivan on Night Court, and Georgie Anne Lahti Hartman on Hearts Afire.	
August 7	Jane Withers	95	Actress whose best-known television work was an 11-year run as Josephine the Plumber for Comet	
August 7	Trevor Moore	41	Actor, comedian, writer, and director (one of the co-founders of the sketch comedy group The Whitest Kids U' Know and a star on its eponymous IFC TV series), creator of Walk the Prank	
August 9	Alex Cord	88	Actor best known as Archangel on Airwolf. Also recurring roles and guest spots on numerous shows.	
August 9	Bob Jenkins	73	Motorsports announcer, most known as lead voice of NASCAR on ESPN/ABC (1981–2000) and IndyCar Series on ESPN/ABC (1999–2001) & Versus/NBCSN (2009–2012), as well as work in various roles for the IMS Radio Network.	
August 16	Jeanetta Jones	60	On-Camera Meteorologist for The Weather Channel from 1986 to 2006	
August 19	William Clotworthy	95	Network censor for NBC (Saturday Night Live, Late Night with David Letterman)	
August 20	Tom T. Hall	85	Country singer-songwriter (hosted Pop! Goes the Country from 1980 to 1982, appeared on the Grand Ole Opry from 1971 to 1996, appeared as a spokesman in commercials for Chevrolet)	
August 21	Nickolas Davatzes	79	Cable television executive (founder of A&E and The History Channel; CEO Emeritus of A&E Networks)	
August 22	Lloyd Dobyns	85	Journalist/anchor, most notably at NBC News (Weekend and NBC News Overnight)	
August 22	Micki Grant	80	Actress best known as Peggy Harris Nolan on Another World. Also played Mrs. Remington on All My Children; guest spots on Law & Order: Criminal Intent and Ed.	
August 23	Michael Nader	76	Actor best known as Dex Dexter on Dynasty and Dimitri Marick on All My Children. Also played Alexi Theophilus on Bare Essence and Enzio Bonnatti on Lucky Chances; guest spots on Magnum, P.I., Law & Order: Special Victims Unit, and Cold Case.	
August 29	Ed Asner	91	Actor and voice actor best known as Lou Grant on The Mary Tyler Moore Show and its spinoff Lou Grant which won him five Emmy Awards. Also won Emmys for his roles on the miniseries Rich Man, Poor Man and Roots. Voiced Hudson on Gargoyles, J. Jonah Jameson on Spider-Man and Cosgrove on Freakazoid!.	
August 29	Peggy Farrell	89	Film and television costume designer (Holocaust, Seize the Day, The Gift of Love: A Christmas Story, Against Her Will: An Incident in Baltimore, The Stepford Husbands, My Body, My Child, The Young Indiana Jones Chronicles, Ruby Bridges)	
August 31	Michael Constantine	94	Film and television actor best known as Principal Seymour Kaufman on Room 222. Also played Jack Ellenhorn on Hey, Landlord, Judge Matthew Sirota on Sirota's Court, Ben Savitch on 79 Park Avenue, Jess Wingate on The Night That Panicked America, Harry Bergen on Summer of My German Soldier, and Gus on My Big Fat Greek Life.	

== September ==
Date	Name	Age	Notability	Source
September 1	Allison Payne	57	News anchor for WGN-TV/Chicago	
September 1	Daffney Unger	46	Former female wrestler for World Championship Wrestling and Total Nonstop Action Wrestling	
September 4	Willard Scott	87	Legendary weather and feature reporter for NBC's Today. Also narrated programs for NASA TV and appeared in TV commercials for Days Inn hotels and was the creator and original portrayer of McDonald's mascot Ronald McDonald.	
September 6	Michael K. Williams	54	Actor best known as Omar Little on The Wire and Chalky White on Boardwalk Empire. Also played Freddy Knight on The Night Of, Bobby McCray on When They See Us, Montrose Freeman on Lovecraft Country, Leonard Pine on Hap and Leonard, Ken Jones on When We Rise, and Quincy on The Kill Point; guest spots on The Sopranos, Third Watch, Boston Legal, CSI: NY, Detroit 1-8-7, and Deadline.	
September 13	Don Collier	92	Actor best known for Western films and NBC television shows such as The High Chaparral, Bonanza, Gunsmoke, and Outlaws as Marshal Will Foreman.	
September 14	Norm Macdonald	61	Canadian comedian, best known as a cast member on Saturday Night Live, on which he hosted Weekend Update and created Celebrity Jeopardy! (in which he parodied Burt Reynolds). Also starred in The Norm Show, A Minute with Stan Hooper, Norm Macdonald Live, Sports Show and Norm Macdonald Has a Show.	
September 15	Gavan O'Herlihy	70	Irish-born actor best known as Chuck Cunningham on Happy Days	
September 16	Jane Powell	92	Singer and actress (recurring role on The Red Skelton Show, numerous guest star spots)	
September 17	Tim Donnelly	77	Actor best known as Firefighter Chet Kelly on Emergency!.	
September 21	Willie Garson	57	Actor best known as Mozzie on White Collar and Stanford Blatch on Sex and the City. Also played Gerard Hirsch on Hawaii Five-0, Henry Coffield on NYPD Blue, Carl on Mr. Belvedere, and Meyer Dickstein on John from Cincinnati; guest spots/recurring roles on numerous other shows.	
September 22	Jay Sandrich	89	Film/TV director (several shows, most notably The Mary Tyler Moore Show and The Cosby Show)	
September 23	David H. DePatie	91	Founder of DePatie–Freleng Enterprises and Marvel Productions	
September 23	Al Harrington	85	Samoan-American actor best known as Detective Ben Kokua on Hawaii Five-O and Mamo Kahike on its reboot.	
September 29	Ravil Isyanov	59	Soviet-born actor best known as Anatoli Kirkin on NCIS: Los Angeles.	
September 29	Michael Tylo	72	Actor best known as Quinton Chamberlain on Guiding Light. Also played Alcalde Luis Ramone on Zorro, Matt Conelly on All My Children, Charlie Prince on General Hospital and Blade Bladeson/Rick Bladeson on The Young And The Restless.	
September 30	John Rigas	96	Founder of Adelphia Communications Corporation and Empire Sports Network	

== October ==
Date	Name	Age	Notability	Source
October 2	Richard Evans	86	Actor best known as Paul Hanley on Peyton Place. Also guest spots on numerous shows.	
October 3	Cynthia Harris	87	Actress best known as Wallis Simpson on Edward & Mrs. Simpson and Sylvia Buchman on Mad About You.	
October 4	Alan Kalter	78	Voiceover artist/announcer for many commercials and shows, most notably for Late Show with David Letterman.	
October 7	Jan Shutan	88	American actress	
October 10	Granville Adams	58	Actor best known as Zahir Arif on Oz and Officer Jeff Westby on Homicide: Life on the Street.	
October 10	Bob Herron	97	American stuntman and actor	
October 13	Ray Fosse	74	Former Major League Baseball catcher and Oakland Athletics color analyst for NBC Sports California	
October 15	JoAnna Cameron	73	American actress and model	
October 16	Betty Lynn	95	Actress best known as Thelma Lou on The Andy Griffith Show.	
October 18	Christopher Ayres	56	Voice actor best known as the voice of Frieza from Dragon Ball franchise.	
October 18	Ralph Carmichael	94	Composer and arranger (I Love Lucy, Bonanza, The Roy Rogers and Dale Evans Show, My Mother the Car)	
October 18	Val Bisoglio	95	Actor best known as Al Steckler on Working Stiffs, Danny Tovo on Quincy, M.E. and Murf Lupo on The Sopranos.	
October 18	William Lucking	80	Actor best known as Harland Pike on Outlaws, Colonel Lynch on The A-Team and Piney Winston on Sons of Anarchy.	
October 22	Jay Black	82	Singer best known for the lead vocalist of the band Jay and the Americans. Also starred as Sindardos on Contract on Cherry Street.	
October 22	Peter Scolari	66	Actor best known as Henry Desmond on Bosom Buddies, Michael Harris on Newhart, Wayne Szalinski on Honey, I Shrunk the Kids: The TV Show and Tad Horvath on Girls. Also played Gillian B. Loeb on Gotham and Bishop Thomas Marx on Evil.	
October 22	Stu Billett	85	Television producer best known for being the creator and executive producer of The People's Court with Ralph Edwards.	
October 24	James Michael Tyler	59	Actor best known as Gunther on Friends	
October 26	Linda Carlson	76	Actress best known as Dr. Janet Cottrell on Westside Medical, Katie McKenna on Kaz, Bev Dutton on Newhart and Judge Beth Bornstein on Murder One.	
October 26	Mort Sahl	94	Canadian-born comedian (appearances on The Ed Sullivan Show and numerous shows)	
October 28	Jovita Moore	54	News anchor and reporter for WSB-TV/Atlanta, KFSM-TV/Fort Smith and WMC-TV/Memphis	
October 28	Camille Saviola	71	Actress and singer best known as Kai Opaka on Star Trek: Deep Space Nine and Justice Esther Weisenberg on First Monday. Also recurring roles and guest spots on numerous shows.	
October 30	Jerry Remy	68	Former Major League Baseball second baseman and Boston Red Sox color analyst for NESN	

== November ==
Date	Name	Age	Notability	Source
November 7	Dean Stockwell	85	Film and television actor best known as Admiral Al Calavicci on Quantum Leap and John Cavil on Battlestar Galactica.	
November 9	Jerry Douglas	88	Actor best known as John Abbott on The Young and the Restless.	
November 14	Bobby Clark	77	Actor best known as Casey Jones Jr. on Casey Jones.	
November 14	Heath Freeman	41	Actor best known as Howard Epps on Bones.	
November 17	Dave Frishberg	88	Jazz pianist and songwriter (contributor to Schoolhouse Rock!)	
November 19	Will Ryan	72	Voice actor (The Adventures of Teddy Ruxpin, Welcome to Pooh Corner, Dumbo's Circus, Mickey Mouse Clubhouse)	
November 24	Lisa Brown	67	Actress best known for playing Nola Richardson on Guiding Light and Iva Snyder on As the World Turns	
November 27	Eddie Mekka	69	Actor best known for playing Carmine Ragusa on Laverne & Shirley	
November 30	Marcus Lamb	64	Televangelist; co-founder, president and CEO of the Daystar Television Network	

== December ==
Date	Name	Age	Notability	Source
December 5	Scott Page-Pagter	52	Producer, writer, director, voice actor (Mighty Morphin Power Rangers — Power Rangers Wild Force, Big Bad Beetleborgs)	
December 5	Bob Dole	98	Politician, Senator from Kansas (1969–1996) who participated in the 1976 and 1996 presidential debates among other TV appearances	
December 8	Blackjack Lanza	86	WWE Hall of Fame professional wrestler	
December 10	Michael Nesmith	78	Actor/musician (The Monkees) and TV host (PopClips, Television Parts)	
December 15	Bridget Hanley	80	Actress best known for playing Candy Pruitt on Here Come the Brides and Wanda Reilly Taylor on Harper Valley PTA	
December 16	Derrick J. Wyatt	49	Animator best known for character design on Transformers: Animated, Scooby-Doo! Mystery Incorporated and Ben 10: Omniverse	
December 17	Frank Mula	71	Writer (Cosby, The Simpsons)	
December 19	Dick Carson	92	Director (Wheel of Fortune, The Merv Griffin Show, The Tonight Show Starring Johnny Carson)	
December 25	Jean-Marc Vallée	58	Film/TV producer/director (TV work including HBO's Big Little Lies and Sharp Objects)	
December 25	Tiffini Hale	46	Cast member on The All New Mickey Mouse Club	
December 28	John Madden	85	American football coach turned broadcaster of 30 years across CBS, Fox, ABC, and NBC from 1979 to 2008. Appeared in various advertisements including for Ace Hardware, Miller Brewing Company, and Tinactin.	
December 31	Betty White	99	Actress of 70 years best known for playing Sue Ann Nivens on The Mary Tyler Moore Show, Rose Nylund on The Golden Girls and The Golden Palace, and Elka Ostrovsky on Hot in Cleveland, and her appearances on game shows including the Password franchise. Star of two eponymous shows (one in 1952–54 and another in 1977–78). At 88 years old, she became the oldest person to host Saturday Night Live in 2010.	
