= Summer Sunday USA =

American television news program

- Summer Sunday USA, opening title, July 8, 1984 broadcast, NBC
- Genre: Newsmagazine
- Directed by: George Paul
- Presented by: Linda Ellerbee and Andrea Mitchell (episodes 1–9); Tom Brokaw (episode 10); Roger Mudd (episode 11)
- Country of origin: United States
- Original language: English
- No. of seasons: 1
- No. of episodes: 11

Production
- Executive producer: Steve Friedman
- Producers: Karen Curry (senior producer), Pat Dalton, Allison Davis, Kathy Fields, Wendy Goldstein, Cheryl Gould (senior producer), Kim McCarthy, Debra Pettit, Meryl Rubine, Pat Ruch, Nancy Steiner, Daniel Webster
- Production location: United States
- Running time: 60 minutes
- Production company: NBC News

Original release
- Network: NBC
- Release: July 1 – September 9, 1984

Summer Sunday USA is an American prime-time television news program produced by NBC News that aired on NBC for 11 episodes, from July 1 to September 9, 1984. Linda Ellerbee and Andrea Mitchell coanchored the first nine episodes, which were broadcast live from a different location in the United States every week. The last two episodes were presented by Tom Brokaw and Roger Mudd, respectively.

Summer Sunday USA was the first news program that incoming NBC News president Lawrence K. Grossman green-lighted, demonstrating the network's commitment to creating a successful prime-time news series after several failed attempts since the early 1970s. It combined coverage of current events with analysis and contextualization of topical issues, as well as lighter human-interest features, all reported by the anchors and NBC News correspondents. It was also an experimental program designed to test the journalistic potential of a newly introduced K_{u}-band (commonly styled as Ku-band) satellite news-gathering vehicle capable of transmitting live broadcasts from anywhere, but it was hampered by technical and other problems. Although ratings and reviews were poor, it was the first national network prime-time news series to fully integrate this technology and the first such series to be anchored by two women. It exemplified an era when technological experimentation and journalistic risk-taking were more possible in network news than they would be in succeeding eras.

== Anchors ==
Ellerbee and Mitchell were the anchors of the initial nine episodes of Summer Sunday USA, making it the first national network prime-time news series anchored by two women (in 1976, Ellerbee and Catherine Mackin had anchored an NBC News special on the new Congress, which Ellerbee identified as the first single-episode network news program anchored by two women). In addition, 95 percent of the staff was female.

Ellerbee had worked for NBC as a reporter and anchor since 1976. She and Lloyd Dobyns (later Bill Schechner) had anchored NBC News Overnight, which aired from July 5, 1982 to December 2, 1983. While it was a critical success, it was cancelled for lack of sufficient advertising support. Even though its small but devoted audience launched a campaign to save it, they ultimately failed. In addition to Ellerbee, several individuals who had worked on NBC News Overnight, including Cheryl Gould, John Long, Debra Pettit, and Daniel Webster, would work on Summer Sunday USA. Mitchell had served as NBC's White House correspondent since 1981 and continued in that role during and after Summer Sunday USA's run. In addition, she had contributed to NBC News Overnight and had substituted for Ellerbee.

== Format ==
For nine successive weeks in July and August 1984 Summer Sunday USA was broadcast live from a different location in the United States. Destinations were mapped out at the beginning of production, but were subject to revision. Each episode focused on a broad theme loosely connected to the respective location, such as America (Washington, DC); the New South (Wake County, North Carolina); the state of American cities (Baltimore); and water (New Orleans). Some episodes were broadcast from cities where newsworthy events were taking place. For example, one aired from the 1984 Democratic National Convention in San Francisco; one from the 1984 Summer Olympics in Los Angeles; one from Max Yasgur's farm in Bethel, New York, to commemorate the fifteenth anniversary of Woodstock; and one from the 1984 Republican National Convention in Dallas. To the extent that Summer Sunday USA took place from a different location each week, it evoked the "On the Road" segments that journalist Charles Kuralt produced for the CBS Evening News from 1967 to 1980, in which he traveled throughout the United States in a motor home with a small crew, reporting on stories he found along the way. However, in contrast to these segments, Summer Sunday USA was broadcast live and focused more on hard news and current events.

Summer Sunday USA was broadcast from a newly introduced Ku-band satellite news-gathering vehicle, which Ellerbee called the "truck." In the early 1980s, the use of the Ku-band, a portion of the electromagnetic spectrum in the microwave range, revolutionized satellite news gathering. In 1984, NBC pioneered the shift from terrestrial to satellite program delivery by launching its Skypath service using Ku-band transponders. This decision validated the use of the previously overlooked Ku-band spectrum, which had been considered undesirable due to rain-fade risks, and helped pave the way for the widespread adoption of mobile satellite news gathering after the first vehicles designed for uplinking live video newsfeeds to satellites, like Summer Sunday USA's truck, were introduced.

Each episode of the program included a mix of live and taped segments. One regular segment was "Trading Places," in which a newsworthy person was given the opportunity to ask questions about their coverage in the media to a panel of reporters. Guests included Sen. Gary Hart, who ran for the 1984 Democratic presidential nomination; Rev. Jesse Jackson, who also ran; and Minister Louis Farrakhan, who endorsed Jackson but had made a series of incendiary antisemitic statements. The Farrakhan segment was plagued by technical problems. Moderator Ellerbee and the reporters were in San Francisco, while Farrakhan was in Chicago. Only Ellerbee could hear Farrakhan (she later learned that a technician had turned off the reporters' earpieces), so she had to repeat his statements to the panel. In her memoir, "And So It Goes": Adventures in Television, she states that many viewers claimed that she had treated both Farrakhan and the reporters unfairly. Nevertheless, besides reviews of the first episode, the Farrakhan segment received more media coverage than any other segment in the program's run, primarily because Farrakhan claimed that Adolf Hitler was "a very great man." Later in the episode, Mayor Ed Koch of New York demanded that Democrats reject "the racism of Farrakhan and Jesse Jackson."

Another regular segment was "Face-Off," in which two people in the news confronted each other. For example, in one episode Sen. George McGovern, the 1972 Democratic presidential candidate, and James G. Watt, President Ronald Reagan's controversial first Secretary of the Interior, faced off against each other, as did Mayor Ed Koch of New York and former Gov. Jerry Brown of California in another. Producer Cheryl Gould, who had worked with Ellerbee on NBC News Overnight, conceived a regular segment titled "NTV," similar to a segment seen on that program. Inspired by the popularity of MTV, the cable television network that rocketed to fame after its establishment in 1981 by showing music videos 24 hours a day, it consisted of video essays told with images and music, and no narration. For example, in the first episode video editor John Long, who had also contributed to NBC News Overnight, created a video essay on the new wave of immigration to the United States, filmed in Miami and set to Neil Diamond's 1980 song "America." In the second episode, whose theme was the New South, Long contributed a video essay combining images of the rural South he filmed in 1963 and in 1984, scored to the 1970 song "It's Not Easy Being Green," interpreted as a metaphor for the experience of being Black in the Deep South.

Additional regular segments included "Voice of the People," in which correspondents interviewed ordinary citizens; "Week in Review," a look back at the past week's news; and "This Week and Next," a look forward at the coming week. Unsuccessful segments were dropped after the first episode, including "The News Quiz," in which one of the anchors would ask viewers a question about the news and then reveal the answer after a commercial break. In the first (and only) News Quiz, viewers were asked: Which of the three remaining Democratic presidential candidates is tallest? (a question that Ellerbee stated was inspired by the then-current popularity of the game Trivial Pursuit). Some segments, such as "Stunt of the Week," never made it to the air (executive producer Steve Friedman described a hypothetical stunt as placing one unlocked bicycle in New York's Central Park and another in a rural area and waiting to see which one was stolen first).

== Episodes ==
No.	Title	Original Release Date
1	Washington, DC	July 1, 1984
Broadcast live from the National Mall in Washington, DC (theme: America). Segments include: Mike Jensen at the New York Stock Exchange on an NBC News poll's findings on the state of the economy; Mike Leonard at Wrigley Field in Chicago on why the fun has gone out of professional baseball; a Voice of the People segment with Steve Mallory reporting from Gorky Park in Moscow and Heidi Schulman from Griffith Park in Los Angeles; "person on the street" interviews in London, Paris, and Tokyo; John Long's video essay on the new immigration; Andrea Mitchell's interviews with Chinese defector Hu Na in Detroit and undocumented Salvadorean immigrant "Rosa Maria" in Washington, DC; Ken Bode and Connie Chung on Democratic presidential nominee Walter Mondale's potential running mate; a Trading Places segment, with Democratic presidential candidate Sen. Gary Hart questioning reporters covering his campaign; a Face-Off with former Secretary of the Interior James G. Watt and former Sen. George McGovern; Mitchell's interview with Mike Love and Bruce Johnston of the Beach Boys in advance of their July 4, 1984 concert on the National Mall.
2	Wake County, North Carolina	July 8, 1984
Broadcast live from a tobacco farm in Wake County, North Carolina (theme: the New South). Segments include: an analysis on what has changed and what has not since the 1965 Selma to Montgomery march for civil rights, reported by Richard Valeriani, who covered the original march; the mayor's race in Selma between incumbent Joseph Smitherman and civil rights activist Rev. Frederick Douglas Reese; a Face-Off on the regulation of smoking with Rep. Charles Rose of North Carolina and Matthew Myers, executive director of the Coalition on Smoking OR Health; a report on the hotly contested 1984 North Carolina US Senate race between Democrat Jim Hunt and Republican Jesse Helms; a story on politicians and preachers and some who are both; a Trading Places segment, in which 1984 Democratic presidential candidate Rev. Jesse Jackson questions reporters covering his campaign, including conservative commentator Patrick Buchanan, NBC News correspondent Jamie Gangel, and Newsweek Boston bureau chief Sylvester Monroe; a report on how the registration of Black voters is changing politics; a visit to three Baptist churches; John Long's video essay combining footage of the rural South he filmed in 1963 and in 1984, scored to the 1970 song "It's Not Easy Being Green."
3	San Francisco, California	July 15, 1984
Broadcast live from San Francisco, where the Democratic National Convention took place July 16–19, 1984. Segments include: John Hart on the 1968 Democratic National Convention in Chicago and the fault lines dividing the party's coalition of interest groups; a report on the role of women in the Democratic Party in light of Walter Mondale's selection of Rep. Geraldine Ferraro as the Democratic vice-presidential nominee, with Rep. Bella Abzug; a report on failed candidates for the Democratic presidential nomination, including former Gov. Reubin Askew, Sen. Alan Cranston, Sen. John Glenn, Sen. Ernest "Fritz" Hollings, and former Sen. George McGovern; a Trading Places segment, in which Minister Louis Farrakhan, who had made antisemitic remarks, questions NBC News correspondent Ken Bode, Village Voice columnist Nat Hentoff, and the Boston Globe journalist David Nyhan; a Face-Off between Georgia State Sen. Julian Bond and author, political commentator, and demographer Ben Wattenberg on the Democratic Party; another Face-Off between New York Mayor Ed Koch and former California Gov. Jerry Brown; a video essay on San Francisco.
4	Washington, DC	July 22, 1984
Broadcast live from Meridian House, the location of the Meridian International Center, a nonpartisan center for diplomacy in Washington, DC (theme: the role of the United States in Central America and the Middle East). Segments include: a survey of the political situation in Central America; Fred Francis's report on President Ronald Reagan's strategy in Central America to halt the spread of Communist influence; Andrea Mitchell's interview with United Nations Ambassador Jeane Kirkpatrick on US military conflicts in Central America; a story on the next day's legislative elections in Israel; a report on the rising influence of Syria and the Soviet Union in Lebanon; a Trading Places segment, in which Hatem Husseini, a member of the Palestinian National Council and former director of Information for the Palestine Liberation Organization, questions reporters on media coverage of the PLO; a video essay on children in the midst of war in Central America and the Middle East.
5	Los Angeles, California	July 29, 1984
Broadcast live from the Olympic Village in Los Angeles, where the Summer Olympics took place July 28–August 12, 1984. Segments include: an analysis of the politicization of the Olympics, including an interview with Peter Ueberroth, president of the Los Angeles Olympics Organizing Committee; a live report from Seoul, site of the 1988 Summer Olympics; Linda Ellerbee on the bidding process for television rights to the 1988 Summer Olympics with Olympics negotiator Barry Frank and NBC Sports vice president Jarobin Gilbert, whose network unsuccessfully bid for the 1984 Summer Olympics; a discussion about the amateur/professional status of Olympic athletes with sports journalists Dave Anderson of the New York Times, Bryan Burwell of the New York Daily News, and Mal Florence of the Los Angeles Times; a story about TreePeople's Million Trees campaign to plant one million trees in Los Angeles for the Summer Olympics (Carl Lewis, a track and field athlete who would win four gold medals that summer, was scheduled to interview journalists for the Trading Places segment, but he cancelled his appearance).
6	Baltimore, Maryland	August 5, 1984
Broadcast live from the Inner Harbor in Baltimore (theme: revitalizing American cities). Segments include: an interview with Baltimore Mayor William Donald Schaefer on the redevelopment of the waterfront; a feature on the Baltimore Sun with the publisher, Reg Murphy; a report on Seattle's renewal, with remarks from Mayor Charles Royer; a Face-Off on the federal government's role in municipal finances between Peoria Mayor Richard E. Carver and New Orleans Mayor Ernest Morial; a discussion on bail for juveniles with Louis "Lou" Arcangeli of the Atlanta Police Department, Sandra A. O'Connor, State's Attorney for Baltimore County, and Lanric "Ric" Hyland, an ex-offenders' advocate; a discussion of regional dialects with David Alan Stern, a renowned dialect coach with a PhD in speech; a story on the good feeling created in Detroit by the Tigers' successful baseball season; a day and night in the life of the sounds of New York City.
7	Bethel, New York	August 12, 1984
Broadcast live from Max Yasgur's farm in Bethel, New York (theme: the fifteenth anniversary of the 1969 Woodstock music festival). Comments from performers who appeared at the festival, including Joan Baez, Jerry Garcia and Bob Weir of the Grateful Dead, Arlo Guthrie, Richie Havens, Country Joe McDonald, Carlos Santana of Santana, Grace Slick formerly of Jefferson Airplane, and David Clayton-Thomas of Blood, Sweat & Tears, as well as announcer Wavy Gravy (Hugh Romney); comments from political figures Julian Bond, Angela Davis, Massachusetts Lieutenant Governor John Kerry, and former Sen. Eugene McCarthy, who ran for president in 1968, 1972, and 1976; a discussion on the lasting impact of Woodstock with civil rights attorney William Kunstler, activist David Mixner, Black Panther Party cofounder Bobby Seale, and conservative writer R. Emmett Tyrrell; interviews with four festival attendees, a local farmer whose barn was invaded by hippies, and college students in Berkeley, Boston, Florida, New York, and Oklahoma on their perceptions of the 1960s; a story on the Hog Farm, a long-running hippie collective cofounded by Wavy Gravy and Jahanara Romney.
8	Dallas, Texas	August 19, 1984
Broadcast live from Dallas, where the Republican National Convention took place August 20–23, 1984 (theme: the relationship between television and political conventions). Segments include: John Dancy on television's convention coverage since the 1940s; Andrea Mitchell on how convention manager Ronald H. Walker is producing the convention for television; George Lewis on the logistic and technical challenges of broadcasting the convention; a discussion moderated by Mitchell on the editorial decisions the networks must address when deciding how to cover conventions, with Dallas Morning News television critic Ed Bark, journalist and media critic Edwin Diamond, NBC News President Lawrence K. Grossman, and Los Angeles Times television critic Howard Rosenberg. (This episode was shortened to 30 minutes on the East Coast because the preceding football game exceeded its scheduled runtime.)
9	New Orleans, Louisiana	August 26, 1984
Broadcast live from the Mississippi River in New Orleans (theme: water [as Linda Ellerbee wrote in "And So It Goes": Adventures in Television, "too much water, not enough water, the quality of water, the sport of water, the poetry of water, and, in one instance, the effect of water on the weather"]). Segments include: a report on water pollution in Silicon Valley; a discussion with Victor Kimm, director of the Environmental Protection Agency's Office of Drinking Water, William Richardson, president of the American Water Works Association, and Jacqueline Warren, staff attorney at the Natural Resources Defense Council; a report on efforts to bring water to arid lands in Israel; the impact of water shortages in South Africa; Linda Ellerbee's interview with University of Miami meteorologist Claes Rooth; an interview with oceanographer Jacques Cousteau; a video essay on the use of water at the 1984 Louisiana World Exposition, held in New Orleans from May 12 to November 11.
10	Iacocca—An American Profile	September 2, 1984
Repeat of NBC Reports: Iacocca—An American Profile, presented by Tom Brokaw (originally aired on January 29, 1984). Written by: Tom Brokaw; producer and director: Tom Spain; associate producer: Jewel Curvin; field producer: Smokey Forester.
11	Special Edition with Roger Mudd	September 9, 1984
Roger Mudd's special report on the presidential and vice-presidential candidates in the upcoming national election: President Ronald Reagan and Vice President George H. W. Bush; former Vice President Walter Mondale and Rep. Geraldine Ferraro. Includes profiles of the four candidates and an extended taped interview with Mondale (Reagan declined to participate). Also includes taped interviews with Clark Clifford, political advisor to Democratic presidents; Martin Feldstein, former chairman of Reagan's Council of Economic Advisors; David Gergen, Reagan's former communications director; Melvin Laird, President Richard Nixon's former Secretary of Defense; Harry McPherson, former counsel to President Lyndon B. Johnson; Ralph Neas, executive director of the Leadership Conference on Civil Rights; Maureen Reagan, Reagan's daughter; David Sawyer, Democratic political consultant; and David Stockman, director of the Office of Management and Budget. Written by: Roger Mudd; executive producer and director: Robert Rogers; produced by: John Holland, Peter Jeffries, Paula Banks Mashore, and Rhonda Schwarz.

== Production ==
=== Development ===
In the 1970s and 1980s, NBC tried to emulate the success of the CBS newsmagazine 60 Minutes by creating its own evening news program. However, these efforts produced a long line of failures, including Weekend, First Tuesday, NBC News Overnight, and Monitor (First Camera). On April 30, 1984, Lawrence K. Grossman, who had served as head of PBS, took over as president of NBC News. One of his first priorities was to develop a prime-time newsmagazine. As he stated that spring, "Somewhere the idea got started that a news division wasn't a news division unless it had a successful magazine show." Shortly after his arrival, he began to develop a prime-time news program titled Summer Sunday USA to be broadcast live on Sunday evenings from 7 to 8 p.m. against 60 Minutes for eleven weeks that summer.

Grossman hired Steve Friedman, who had helped turn around NBC's morning show Today, as Summer Sunday USA's executive producer. Friedman, who worked on both shows simultaneously, brought over several of his Today colleagues, including director George Paul and senior producer Karen Curry. He declared that he wanted to demonstrate that NBC News was ready to try new things, including things he could not do on Today, fully leverage the division's many correspondents, and experiment with live on-location broadcasting with low-risk stakes because viewership traditionally declined in the summer.

Grossman considered various NBC News journalists as potential anchors or reporters, perhaps on a rotating basis, for Summer Sunday USA. Ellerbee, John Chancellor, Connie Chung, Bernard Kalb, Marvin Kalb, and Roger Mudd were among the names reportedly considered. Early reports stated that Mudd would anchor episodes from the 1984 Democratic National Convention in San Francisco and the 1984 Republican National Convention in Dallas, but these plans were not executed. Instead, after Ellerbee and Mitchell had made their planned exit from the show, Mudd would anchor the last episode of the program.

In May 1984, Grossman asked Ellerbee to serve as coanchor because he admired her storytelling. He told her that the program would be "new and completely different," that it would be broadcast each week from a different location from a truck equipped with new satellite technology, and that she did not need to worry about ratings. He asked Mitchell, whom he described as a "'first-rate, tenacious, indefatigable reporter," to be Ellerbee's coanchor.

In her memoir Talking Back … to Presidents, Dictators, and Assorted Scoundrels, Mitchell states, perhaps jokingly, that she received the invitation from Grossman after all the male anchors at NBC had turned down the opportunity: "So our bosses at NBC came up with a novel alternative format that they boiled down to 'live television, with two chicks and a truck.'" She also recalls that criticism of the program as "lightweight," including by NBC News correspondents, reflected an "old-boy aspect that beats up on anything that's new or different. The shots hurt the network, and that's dumb because we're all in this together."

At the annual meeting of NBC affiliates in May 1984, Grossman tried to generate interest in the program. He proclaimed: "We're designing 'Summer Sunday, USA' to try new things, take some risks, give visibility to some of our best people and stimulate interest leading up to the conventions—a determined effort to uncork the new energies and initiatives at NBC News." But ultimately, 15 percent of NBC's affiliates, including those in Boston and Buffalo, declined to air the program, instead choosing to air more profitable syndicated shows, like the weekly music countdown program, Solid Gold. The general manager of NBC's Boston affiliate explained that he did not air Summer Sunday USA because he was not inclined to schedule a program into a timeslot for only eleven weeks. Perhaps spurred by the fact that Grossman was the former president of PBS, two public television stations, WGBH-TV in Boston and WNED-TV in Buffalo, decided to air the program after the NBC affiliates in those cities refused. But because the program was not airing on NBC affiliates in these cities and did not carry commercials, these decisions did not have a positive effect on its ratings. Instead, the fact that only about 150 of NBC's 206 affiliates aired the program likely contributed to its consistently last-place position in the weekly ratings.

At a meeting of journalists and critics in June 1984, Grossman described Summer Sunday USA as "unabashedly experimental." He declared: "We're going to use it to find new ways of presenting news and information. Some of it may not work. But we'll consider it a success if we come out of it with ideas that we can use for a permanent program." Agreeing that the program was experimental, Ellerbee, too, anticipated that some things would work, while others would not, and that the latter would be jettisoned. Grossman, Friedman, and Ellerbee all declined to call the program a newsmagazine—partly to distinguish it from 60 Minutes and partly because, as Friedman admitted, every program that the network had labeled a newsmagazine had failed.

Production of Summer Sunday USA proceeded rapidly throughout June in preparation for the July 1, 1984 premiere. Because Mitchell was working full-time as NBC News's White House correspondent from Monday through Friday, Ellerbee would spend the week planning the episodes with Friedman and the producers. On Friday night Mitchell would fly to the city from which that week's episode was broadcasting, write the script with Ellerbee on Saturday, rehearse and do the broadcast on Sunday, and then return to Washington, DC, immediately afterward to begin the cycle again.

=== Premiere ===
The first episode of Summer Sunday USA was broadcast live from the National Mall in Washington, DC, on Sunday, July 1, 1984 from 7 to 8 pm. The theme, selected because it was airing shortly before July 4, was America. It opened with a segment from Mike Jensen, NBC's financial correspondent, reporting live from the New York Stock Exchange on an NBC News poll's findings on the state of the economy. Because the exchange was closed, however, it was empty. Similarly, Mike Leonard, a Today correspondent, reported live from Chicago's Wrigley Field on why the fun had gone out of professional baseball. Yet, because that day's game had ended and the ballpark was closed, it, too, was empty. Steve Mallory, an NBC News foreign correspondent in Europe, and Heidi Schulman, an NBC News government and public policy correspondent in Los Angeles, broadcast a "Voice of the People" segment live from Gorky Park in Moscow and Griffith Park in Los Angeles, respectively. Other correspondents conducted "person on the street" interviews in London, Paris, and Tokyo, asking residents their opinions of Americans.

Part of the episode dealt with the subtheme of immigration to the United States. For the NTV segment, John Long contributed a pretaped video essay scored to Neil Diamond's 1980 song "America." Consisting of still and moving images from Ellis Island, the Lower East Side in New York, and Little Havana in Miami, it visually juxtaposed earlier waves of immigration from Europe with the current wave from the Caribbean and Latin America. Another segment examined who gets to be an American by contrasting the stories of Hu Na, a young tennis player from the People's Republic of China who was granted asylum after she defected in 1982, and "Rosa Maria," an undocumented immigrant who was denied asylum after fleeing political violence in El Salvador. However, because of technical difficulties, it became the most notorious segment in the entire series. Mitchell, in Washington, DC, tried to interview Hu Na, in Detroit, but audio problems prevented Hu Na from hearing her questions. In addition, Hu Na's English-language skills were limited. As Mitchell recalled, "I raised my voice and repeated myself—still nothing. Finally, I was practically screaming at the poor kid, who still responded with a blank stare. As it turned out, no one had checked to see if she spoke English." She then pivoted in desperation to Rosa Maria, who had covered her face with a straw hat to conceal her identity. Ellerbee wrote that Mitchell "went ahead with the interview, never mentioning the hat, never seeming to notice she was interviewing a hubcap. … Unintentionally, it provided one of television's funniest moments."

On the political front, Ken Bode and Connie Chung, anchor of NBC News at Sunrise and the Saturday edition of NBC Nightly News, discussed the potential running mates of presumed Democratic presidential nominee Walter Mondale. For the Trading Places segment, Sen. Gary Hart, who had recently lost his campaign for the Democratic presidential nomination to Mondale, questioned reporters covering him, including David Broder of the Washington Post. For the Face-Off segment, the Beach Boys were invited to confront former Secretary of the Interior James G. Watt, who had banned them from performing at the July 4, 1983 concert on the National Mall because he claimed they were unwholesome and encouraged alcohol and drug use. He was later forced to retract his ban, but by then they had committed to another appearance. The Beach Boys, however, refused to face off against Watt. Appearing in their place was 1972 Democratic presidential nominee, Sen. George McGovern. But instead of the confrontation the producers sought, the two were congenial. As television critic Tom Shales commented, "unfortunately, Watt put on his vaguely born-again grin and decided to play Mr. Sweetie. 'This is a great country and I'm certainly proud of it,' he beamed." At the end of the episode, Mitchell interviewed Mike Love of the Beach Boys, who was in Atlanta. After he talked up his upcoming projects, she snapped at him, "Aside from the promotional announcement, what about Jim Watt?"

=== Aftermath of premiere ===
After the first episode of Summer Sunday USA placed last in that week's ratings and television critics slammed the program, Friedman acknowledged that production was too rushed, that fewer but longer segments would be better, and that Ellerbee and Mitchell did not appear to be a cohesive team. Ellerbee recognized that the program was not up to her usual standards. NBC had hoped that the Ku-band satellite news-gathering vehicle would spur innovative journalism by enabling live on-location broadcasting, which the reporters of 60 Minutes could not do. However, the pressure to use the technology, which was unreliable, compromised the quality of the first few episodes in particular. As Shales remarked, "The prized piece of equipment here is a 'Ku-band' truck that satellites its signal back to the network from almost anywhere, and when you have such a truck, you consider it your mandate to go someplace."

Ellerbee later observed that the truck "cut a swath through our journalism all summer." Similarly, Mitchell suggested that letting the technology drive their journalism meant that they had to develop the rationale for the program as they went along. As Ellerbee concluded, they needed to shift gears: "After the first program, we held a few truths to be self-evident, if slow to sink in. Our secret weapon was not enough. A truck is not a program. A truck is a truck. We needed more than flashy toys. We needed something to say, and we needed to limit a one-hour program to one hour's worth of programming ideas. Certain completely new and different concepts were allowed to creep away in the dark of night. At the head of that parade was 'The News Quiz.'" She, Mitchell, and the producers also decided that each future episode would have a more focused theme, defined by the location from which they were broadcasting (which had been determined in advance by network executives).

While Summer Sunday USA continued to be plagued by technical programs in subsequent episodes, its journalistic focus steadily improved. Ellerbee was particularly pleased with the seventh episode, broadcast live on August 12, 1984 from Max Yasgur's farm, the site of the 1969 Woodstock music festival. This episode successfully used satellite technology to broadcast live conversations with some of the festival's original participants from a historic setting, exploring broader issues relevant to her generation. She observed: "The fifteenth anniversary was the peg, but the point of the program was to look at that time we like to call the 'sixties' … . The question was whether anything that had happened back then caused permanent change, or had the whole thing been no more than a cultural hiccup. I turned forty that week, and chose the 'Woodstock' program as a birthday gift from me to me, because the subject was one which had interested me for years and one I'd wanted to write about." She stated that by the next week's broadcast from the 1984 Republican National Convention in Dallas, was beginning to feel good about the program.

Nevertheless, the program's ratings never improved. At the end of the ninth episode, Ellerbee issued her farewell to viewers, which echoed the words that Dobyns had used at the end of the final episode of Weekend: "It has been fun. It is now over. And so it goes." Two more episodes of Summer Sunday USA, hosted respectively by Brokaw and Mudd, aired. Then it was replaced by Silver Spoons and Punky Brewster, two sitcoms targeted to children and teens—NBC News's implicit acknowledgment that it could not compete with 60 Minutes.

Grossman tried to put a positive spin on Summer Sunday, USA, the first news program he developed at NBC, by admitting that he learned that "we have a lot to do on the technical and production end of live programming." He added: "I was pleased that some real progress was made on that score after the first couple of programs." He left NBC in 1986, after disagreements with the network's new owners. Friedman returned to Today. Mitchell refocused on her role as NBC News's White House correspondent. And Ellerbee contributed regular Friday commentaries, titled "T.G.I.F.," to Today. In 1986, she left NBC and signed a three-year contract with ABC, where she developed her next program, Our World, which lasted for one season. The same year she published her best-selling memoir, "And So It Goes": Adventures in Television. After Summer Sunday USA went off the air, NBC made additional attempts to launch another prime-time new series, finally finding lasting success with the 1992 premiere of Dateline.

== Reception ==
=== Ratings ===
Ratings for the first episode of Summer Sunday USA were disastrous: It was the least watched network television show of the week ending July 1 and for each of the following eight weeks. For the last two weeks, it was the second-least watched show.

Episode No.	Date	Rank	Rating/Share
1	July 1	63	3.5/8
2	July 8	65	3.6/8
3	July 15	61	3.2/7
4	July 22	57	3.2/7
5	July 29	54	2.8/6
6	August 5	54	2.7/5
7	August 12	54	3.2/6
8	August 19	65	3.3/7
9	August 26	58	3.4/7
10	September 2	68	4.1/10
11	September 9	57	6.7/12

=== Reviews ===
Reviews of Summer Sunday USA were almost universally negative. Tom Shales of the Washington Post described the program as a "colossally pointless" show whose "key troubles … were chronic overcrowding of a premiere, to a perfectly ludicrous state, and the old TV heebie-jeebie of letting your equipment run your show." He continued: "Overbooked and overgimmicked, the hour left the two anchors no room to breathe, and Friedman absent-mindedly didn't even bother to include them both in the same shot until near the end of the show." Variety's reviewer derided the program as "an exhausting viewing experience" and observed that live feeds were used repeatedly for no good reason: "Never … did the hour-long cornucopia of interviews make a point of going to these cities, except to have NBC showcase its correspondents live. To go live simply to go live makes for 'so what?' television." Although it claimed that Ellerbee and Mitchell were background to the technology and lost control of some segments, it acknowledged that they "handled the multi-ring circus with vim." Newsday's Marvin Kitman had a similar view about both the misuse of technology and about the anchors.

By contrast, Martha Bayles of the Wall Street Journal criticized Ellerbee as detached and cynical, Mitchell as "dead earnest, refusing to display any softness or amiability," and even the program's presumed audience as "probably those members of the '60s generation who have preserved their self-righteousness to the point of feeling chronically overqualified, both morally and mentally, for the roles they now play in the big chill of adult society." Similarly, John Carman of the Atlanta Constitution declared that Ellerbee and Mitchell were a "bad match as hosts" and condemned the program itself as an "embarrassment" to the anchors, Grossman, and NBC News. Finally, while Bonnie Malleck of the Kitchener-Waterloo Record complimented aspects of the program, especially the episode on the 1984 Democratic National Convention, she also stated that "earlier criticisms of the show's uncohesive look, technical snafus and lack of direction seemed well-founded as the program exuded an appearance of too much on the menu and too little preparation behind it."

== Home media ==
Summer Sunday USA has not been released on DVD. Videocassettes of the first nine episodes of the program are held in the Copyright Collection of the Library of Congress in Washington, DC. A copy of the tenth episode, which originally aired as NBC Reports: Iacocca—An American Profile on January 29, 1984, is in the collection of the Paley Archive at the Beverly Hills Public Library and at the Paley Museum in New York. Copies of the eighth and eleventh episodes are in the collection of the Vanderbilt University Television Archive in Nashville.

== Themes and analysis ==
Summer Sunday USA was the first prime-time network news series to fully integrate live, on-location broadcasting using a Ku-band satellite news-gathering vehicle. After its introduction in 1984, this type of vehicle transformed television news-gathering, especially of breaking news, by facilitating live reporting from remote areas and easing deadline pressures. NBC helped its affiliates purchase such vehicles, and by late 1986, nearly 80 television stations in the United States had them. In addition to learning how to use this cutting-edge technology more effectively during the course of the series, Ellerbee, Mitchell, Steve Friedman, and Lawrence K. Grossman also came to understand that it could not replace rigorous reporting. In 1986, Grossman told a journalist that while NBC News had the capacity to report from anywhere in the world through satellite uplinks, it had to focus on quality journalism to differentiate itself from its competitors. Eventually, satellite news-gathering vehicles evolved into compact systems, such as flyaway and suitcase systems.

Summer Sunday USA was also the first prime-time network new series to be anchored by two women. While the one-man/one-woman coanchor team would become common in network news series in the following years, the two-woman anchor team would remain rare. In the summer of 1987, the all-woman team of Judy Woodruff, Elizabeth Drew, and Cokie Roberts staffed coverage of the Iran-Contra joint congressional hearings on PBS. However, the next all-woman team did not appear on a prime-time network news series until 2013, when Gwen Ifill and Woodruff became coanchors of the PBS News Hour. Summer Sunday USA was also a launching pad for women such as senior producer Cheryl Gould, who moved to NBC Nightly News, where she eventually became senior producer.
