= Cheryl Gould =

American journalist (born 1952)

- Born: Cheryl Gould; July 7, 1952 (age 74); Burlington County, New Jersey, United States
- Occupation: Journalist
- Spouse: Reid Weingarten
- Children: 1

Cheryl Gould is an American journalist who worked at NBC News for almost four decades. She was the first female Executive Producer of a nightly newscast, and is known as a pioneer, role model, and mentor for women in the industry. She has been an important voice in efforts to make newsrooms more diverse and remains active in the industry.

== Personal life ==
Cheryl Gould grew up in Burlington County, New Jersey. She was among the earliest women to be admitted to Princeton University, where she majored in History, graduating with honors in 1974. She also attended the Sorbonne.

She lives in New York City, has one son, and is married to Reid Weingarten, an attorney.

== Career ==
Gould retired from NBC News in 2014 as Senior Vice President. Before becoming a senior manager, Gould spent a decade at NBC Nightly News with Tom Brokaw where she ended her tenure as the broadcast’s first female Executive Producer.

Prior to Nightly News, Gould helped create and was Senior Producer of the award winning broadcast NBC News Overnight with Linda Ellerbee, which was described as "possibly the best written and most intelligent news program ever" by the jury judging the duPont-Columbia Awards. After NBC News Overnight was cancelled, Gould worked with Ellerbee again, as Senior Producer of Summer Sunday USA. Gould also worked for the presidential elections unit, and was a producer for Tom Brokaw’s documentary “D-Day Plus 40.”

Gould was a radio correspondent and field producer for NBC News in Paris, and later in London from 1977 to 1981. Before moving to Europe, she was a radio reporter for WAXC and a TV reporter for WOKR, both in Rochester, New York.

== Awards and profiles ==
Gould has won numerous awards throughout her career, including an Emmy, a duPont-Columbia award for Overnight, and an Edward R. Murrow award. She has been profiled in numerous newspapers and magazines, including a 1988 profile in The Washington Post. Gould has been featured in several books about women in the broadcast news industry, including And So It Goes by Linda Ellerbee, and Waiting for Primetime: The Women of Television News by Marlene Sanders and Marcia Rock. She has been lauded for her role as mentor to countless young journalists.

Gould published articles in The New York Times, msnbc.com, and wrote a reaction piece to the movie Broadcast News in Newsweek, December 28, 1987. Gould has been a guest lecturer at schools and associations including Columbia University Graduate School of Journalism, Princeton University, Vassar College, New York University, Business Today annual conferences, the Asian American Journalists Association, and General Electric’s Women’s Network.

== Professional organizations ==
For two decades, Gould has been an active board member of the Committee to Protect Journalists, and was a member of a CPJ mission to Tunisia which obtained the release from prison of an online journalist who had been jailed on trumped up charges for writing about government corruption. In msnbc.com blog posts entitled "Fighting for press freedom in Tunisia" (July 16, 2008) and "One Step Closer to Press Freedom in Tunisia" (July 30, 2008), Gould wrote a firsthand account of Tunisian journalists’ fight for freedom of the press.

In May 2015 Gould was a keynote speaker in Beirut for the Samir Kassir Foundation on the topic of freedom of expression. She is a member of the Council on Foreign Relations, and serves as a finalist juror for the duPont-Columbia award, one of the most prestigious awards in broadcast journalism.
