= Chris Jansing =

American TV news correspondent (born 1957)

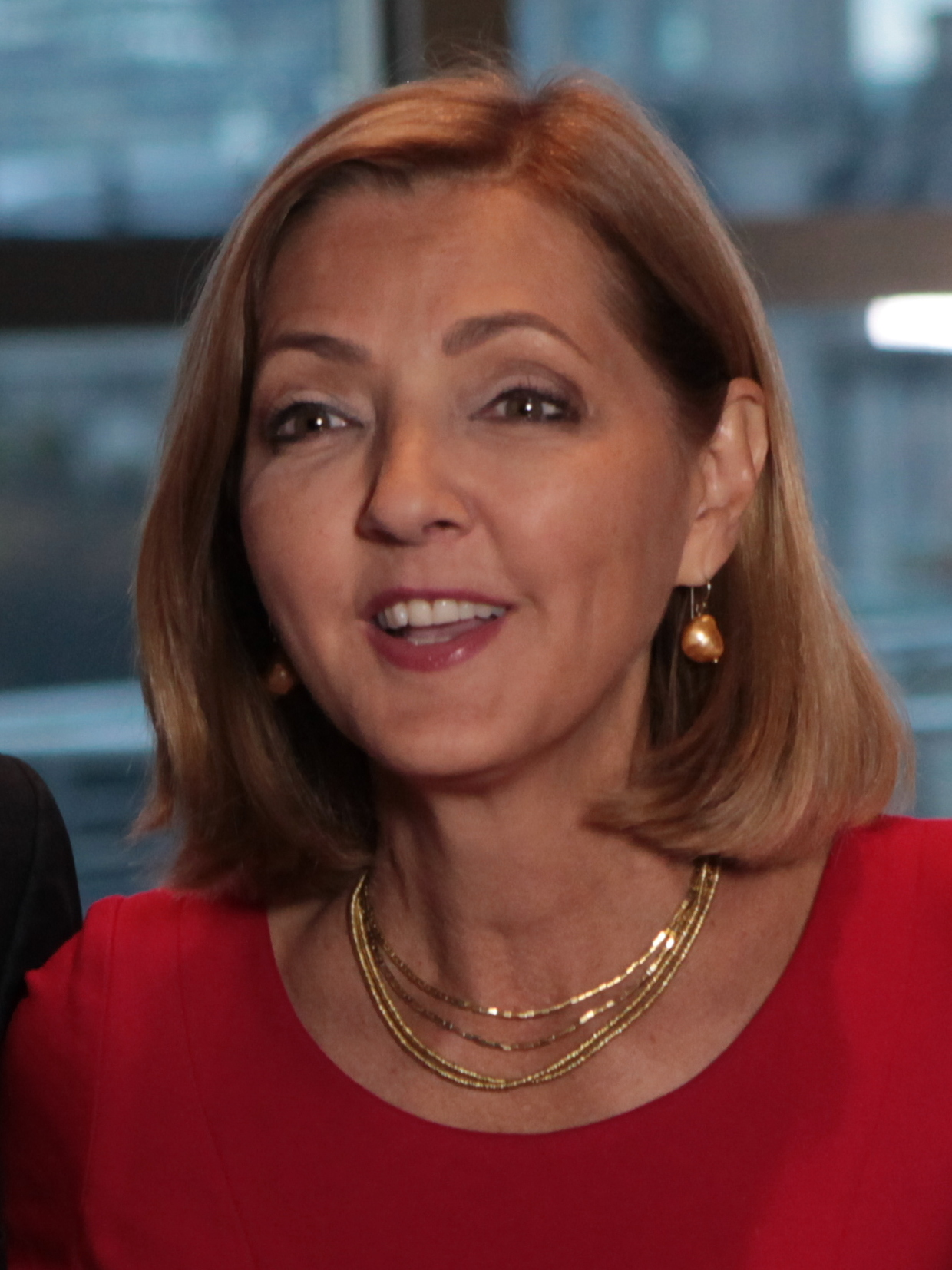
- Jansing in 2018
- Born: Christine Ann Kapostasy; January 30, 1957 (age 69); Fairport Harbor, Ohio, U.S.
- Education: Otterbein College
- Occupation: Television journalist
- Years active: 1980–present
- Employer: MS NOW
- Spouse: Robert Jansing (m. 1982; div.)

Christine Ann Kapostasy-Jansing (born January 30, 1957) is an American television journalist. She serves as the chief political reporter at MS NOW.

She previously hosted Jansing and Company on MSNBC from 2010 to 2014. She vacated her show to serve as NBC News' senior White House correspondent from 2014 to 2017. Jansing then anchored the news program Chris Jansing Reports from 2022 to 2026 and was later appointed as MS NOW's chief political reporter.

== Early life and education ==
Jansing (née Kapostasy) was born to a Roman Catholic family in Fairport Harbor, Ohio, the youngest of 12 children of Joseph and Tilly Kapostasy. She is of Hungarian and Slovak descent. Originally a political science major, Jansing switched majors to broadcast journalism after working for the college radio station. In 1978, she graduated from Otterbein College with a Bachelor of Arts degree.

== Career ==
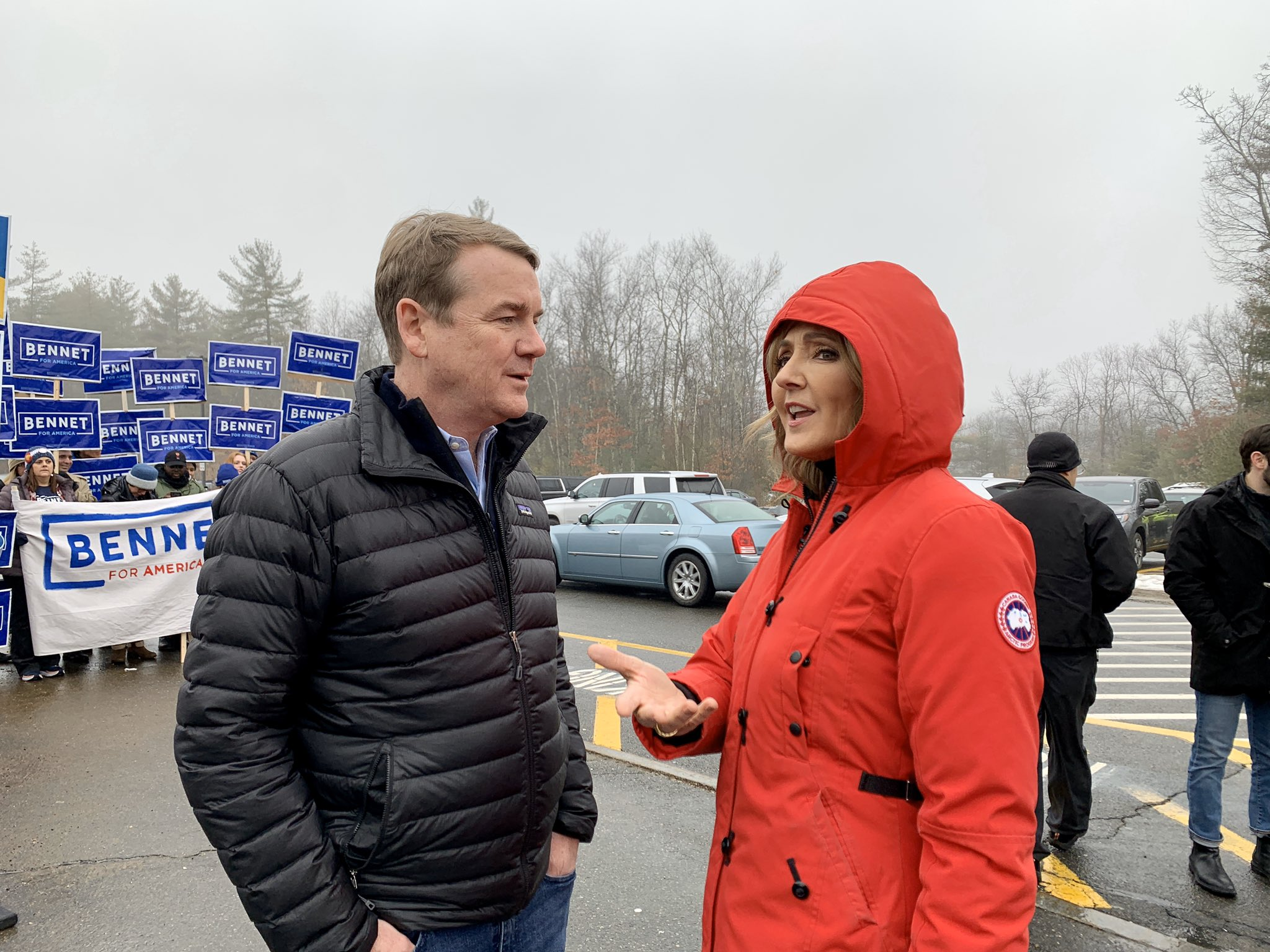
Jansing preparing to interview Senator Michael Bennet during his 2020 presidential campaign

After college, she worked as an intern at a cable station in Columbus, Ohio, and then accepted a job for a short stint at radio station WIPS (AM) in Ticonderoga, New York. Her next stop was as a news reporter for WOKO, an AM radio station in Albany, New York. She then accepted a position as a general assignment reporter for WNYT television in Albany, New York, where she quickly rose to become the weekend anchor and then the weekly co-anchor. She stayed at WNYT for 17 years. While there, she won a New York Emmy Award in 1997 for her coverage of the Olympic Park bombing in Atlanta, Georgia.

Jansing joined NBC News in June 1998, at which point she began to use the last name of Jansing professionally instead of her maiden name of Kapostasy that she had used before then. She has since anchored and reported for MSNBC and has been a substitute anchor for The Today Show, and the Sunday version of NBC Nightly News. In 2008, she relocated to Los Angeles and worked as a field reporter for two years before returning as an anchor in 2010. Jansing previously anchored the 10 a.m. ET hour on MSNBC weekdays on Jansing and Company, with Richard Lui regularly serving as a correspondent and substitute anchor. The show ended on June 13, 2014, when Jansing became NBC's Senior White House Correspondent.

On June 1, 2017, Jansing was named senior national correspondent for MSNBC. As part of the role, Jansing would continue to anchor the network's breaking news coverage alongside Brian Williams, as well as provide coverage from the White House and Capitol Hill.

On May 6, 2022, after MTP Daily was moved to NBC News Now, Jansing anchored the slot with her own hour of MSNBC Reports. Titled Chris Jansing Reports, her show expanded to two hours on February 13, 2023. In February 2025, Chris Jansing Reports was moved from 1 p.m. ET to noon, following the departure of Andrea Mitchell's program, and ahead of MSNBC's spin-off from NBCUniversal.

On March 18, 2026, after MSNBC rebranded to MS NOW, Jansing was named the network's chief political reporter. Chris Jansing Reports concluded in June, and Jansing pivoted to reporting from the 2026 midterm campaign trail soon after. She debuted a new social media series, Midterm Meals, and contributed to the Los Angeles Times's coverage of the 25th anniversary of the September 11 attacks.

== Awards ==
- An Emmy Award for her coverage of the 1996 Olympic Park bombing at the Olympic Games in Atlanta. She also has a second Emmy Award.
- "Best Person" award from the New York State Broadcasters Association for her report on hunger in New York State.
- Inducted into the New York State Broadcasters Association Hall of Fame in June 2016.

== Personal life ==
In 1982, she married Robert Jansing, a chemist, who ran an analytical chemistry laboratory. In 1998, after she moved to NBC News, she began using her married name, in which she explained it was easier for viewers to pronounce. The couple subsequently divorced.

Preceded by Chuck Todd	NBC News Chief White House Correspondent	Succeeded by Hallie Jackson
