= Reuven Frank =

American broadcast news executive (1920–2006)

- Born: Israel Reuven Frank; December 7, 1920; Montreal, Quebec, Canada
- Died: February 5, 2006 (aged 85); Tenafly, New Jersey, U.S.
- Education: City College of New York (BA)
- Spouse: Bernice Kaplow (m. 1946)
- Children: Peter Frank; James Aaron Frank
- Awards: Emmy Award 1963 The Tunnel; Peabody Award 1975 Weekend

Reuven Frank (December 7, 1920 – February 5, 2006) was an American broadcast news executive.

== Life and career ==
Born Israel Reuven Frank (he later dropped his first name) to a Jewish family in Montreal, Quebec, he earned a bachelor's degree in social science at City College of New York. He served four years in the United States Army during World War II, rising to the rank of sergeant. After completing his studies at the Columbia University Graduate School of Journalism, he worked for three years at the Newark Evening News as a reporter, rewrite man and night city editor. At the insistence of Gerald Green, he joined NBC News as a writer for the Camel News Caravan in 1950.

Frank was a key figure in bringing television news out of the shadow of radio news by emphasizing the importance of visuals in telling stories. He paired Chet Huntley and David Brinkley for the first time to co-anchor NBC's coverage of the 1956 Democratic and Republican National Conventions. Later that same year, he created the groundbreaking Huntley-Brinkley Report, and was its producer until 1964. The national catchphrase "Good night, David" "Good night, Chet" was credited to Frank.

Frank's documentaries included Emmy Award-winning report The Tunnel (1962) about the escape of 59 Germans through a passage under the Berlin Wall. It received the Emmy Award for program of the year, the only documentary ever so honored. In the 1970s, he created and was executive producer of Weekend, a news magazine hosted by Lloyd Dobyns that originally aired one Saturday a month from 11:30 p.m. to 1:00 a.m. The program received a Peabody award. Linda Ellerbee later joined as co-host.

External videos
- Booknotes interview with Frank on Out of Thin Air, September 15, 1991, C-SPAN

Frank served two tenures as president of NBC News, from 1968 to 1974 and from 1982 to 1984, and mentored such journalists as Tom Brokaw, John Chancellor, Linda Ellerbee, and Andrea Mitchell. His memoir, Out of Thin Air: The Brief Wonderful Life of Network News, was published in 1991.

Frank was a resident of Tenafly, New Jersey. He died of pneumonia on February 5, 2006, at the age of 85. He was a member of Temple Sinai of Bergen County.

== Personal life ==
In 1946, he married Bernice Kaplow; they had two sons: notable art critic Peter Solomon Frank and James Aaron Frank.

== Quotes ==
- "Sunshine is a weather report, a flood is news." Frank to Floyd Abrams.
- "The highest power of television journalism is not in the transmission of information but in the transmission of experience."

== Other references ==
- Collins, Scott (February 7, 2006). "Reuven Frank, 85; NBC Producer Helped Launch 'Huntley-Brinkley' Show". Los Angeles Times.
- Steinberg, Jacques (February 7, 2006). "Reuven Frank, Producer Who Pioneered TV News Coverage at NBC, Is Dead at 85". The New York Times.
