= And So It Goes (disambiguation) =

"And So It Goes" is a song by Billy Joel.

And So It Goes may also refer to:

== Music ==
- And So It Goes (album), by Don Williams, 2012
- "And So It Goes" (Nitty Gritty Dirt Band song), 1989
- "And So It Goes", a song by Graham Nash from Wild Tales, 1974
- "And So It Goes", a song by Roberta Flack from Oasis, 1988

== Other media ==
- And So It Goes (film), a 2014 American film
- And So It Goes (book), a 1986 autobiography by Linda Ellerbee
- Billy Joel: And So It Goes, a 2025 documentary film about Billy Joel

== See also ==
- So It Goes (disambiguation)
