= 1981–82 United States network television schedule (late night) =

These are the late night schedules on all three networks for each calendar season beginning September 1981. All times are Eastern/Pacific.

PBS is not included, as member television stations have local flexibility over most of their schedules and broadcast times for network shows may vary, CBS and ABC are not included on the weekend schedules (as the networks do not offer late night programs of any kind on weekends).

Talk/variety shows are highlighted in yellow, network news programs in gold, and local news & programs are highlighted in white background.

== Monday-Friday ==
-		11:00 PM	11:30 PM	12:00 AM	12:30 AM	1:00 AM	1:30 AM	2:00 AM	2:30 AM	3:00 AM	3:30 AM	4:00 AM	4:30 AM	5:00 AM	5:30 AM
ABC		local programming	Nightline	ABC Late Night (Mon.-Thur.)/Fridays (Fri)			Local
CBS		local programming	The CBS Late Movie				Local
NBC	Fall	local programming	The Tonight Show Starring Johnny Carson		Tomorrow Coast to Coast (Mon.-Thur.)/SCTV Network 90 (Fri)			local programming
NBC	Winter	local programming	The Tonight Show Starring Johnny Carson		Late Night with David Letterman (Mon.-Thur.)/SCTV Network 90 to 2:00 (Fri)		local programming
NBC	Summer	local programming	The Tonight Show Starring Johnny Carson		Late Night with David Letterman (Mon.-Thur.)/SCTV Network 90 to 2:00 (Fri)		NBC News Overnight (Mon.-Thur., 1:30-2:30/Fri., 2:00-3:00)		local programming

== Saturday ==
-	11:00 PM	11:30 PM	12:00 AM	12:30 AM	1:00 AM	1:30 AM	2:00 AM	2:30 AM	3:00 AM	3:30 AM	4:00 AM	4:30 AM	5:00 AM	5:30 AM
NBC	local programming	Saturday Night Live			local programming

== Sunday ==
-	11:00 PM	11:30 PM	12:00 AM	12:30 AM	1:00 AM	1:30 AM	2:00 AM	2:30 AM	3:00 AM	3:30 AM	4:00 AM	4:30 AM	5:00 AM	5:30 AM
NBC	local programming	NBC Late Night Movie				local programming

== By network ==
=== ABC ===
Returning Series

- ABC Late Night
- Fridays
- Nightline

=== CBS ===
Returning Series

- The CBS Late Movie

=== NBC ===
Returning Series

- NBC Late Night Movie
- Saturday Night Live
- SCTV Network 90
- Tomorrow Coast to Coast
- The Tonight Show Starring Johnny Carson

New Series

- NBC News Overnight
- Late Night with David Letterman

Not Returning From 1980-81

- The Midnight Special
