= Mark Nykanen =

American journalist (1951/1952 – 2022)

- Born: 1951; New York City, U.S.
- Died: September 16, 2022 (aged 70)
- Citizenship: American and Canadian
- Occupation: Writer
- Spouse: Lucinda Taylor
- Awards: Edgar Award; Alfred I. duPont–Columbia University Award; Emmy Award for Outstanding Investigative Journalism
- Website: web.archive.org/web/20190327235811/http://www.marknykanen.com/

Mark Nykanen (1951 – September 16, 2022) was an American novelist and journalist. Nykanen began his career as a journalist for New Times Weekly in Phoenix, before becoming a news director at KDKB radio and news anchor for Arizona PBS. He then received four Emmy awards for his work as an on-air correspondent at NBC News; an Edgar Allan Poe Award for writing the NBC documentary Silent Shame: The Sexual Abuse of Children; and shared a Dupont-Columbia Award for Investigative Journalism. After NBC, Nykanen served as the Press Secretary for California Governor Jerry Brown’s 1992 campaign for the Democratic nomination for President. He later became an author, publishing five novels under his own name and two under the pseudonym James Jaros.

== Early life ==
Mark Nykanen spent his childhood years in Arizona. During the Vietnam War period, he became a war resister. He attended college but did not graduate.

== Journalism ==
During the 1970s Nykanen was a reporter for Phoenix’s New Times Weekly. One of his first prominent news investigations was into the Arizona State Prison Complex – Florence, where his undercover work saw him banned from the facility, and his articles clipped from newspapers before they were distributed to the inmates, in an attempt to suppress his discoveries. His prison reporting contributed to the U.S. Commission on Civil Rights investigation of the inhumane conditions of prisons in Arizona. Nykanen then became an on-air news reporter and news director for KDKB radio in Phoenix, and he was later the news anchor for the Arizona Weekly television broadcast on KAET. During this time he received several Arizona Press Club Awards in print, radio, and television, including an investigation into the Arizona Revenue Department that led to the resignation of several of its top officials.

In 1980, Nykanen began working for NBC News as a correspondent, and continued his investigative journalism. In September, 1982, he began working on a documentary uncovering an international ring of child pornography and prostitution that spanned from Holland and Denmark to the American Midwest. The documentary was aired nationwide on NBC as an hour-long special under the title Silent Shame: The Sexual Abuse of Children. The New York Times called the broadcast, “as good an examination of a difficult topic as we are likely to see on television.” During the documentary, Nykanen interviewed child molesters on camera and connected them to the lucrative child pornography industry. The show was awarded the Emmy for Outstanding Investigative Journalism in the Programs category.

During the 1980s, Nykanen broadcast other reports on NBC Nightly News. In 1982, he was nominated for an Emmy in Outstanding Investigative Journalism, Segments category for his report Land Hustles. In 1983 Nykanen uncovered the use of German Nazis as US spies in the days following World War Two. He also headed the investigative reporting unit for the NBC television news magazine Monitor.

In 1985, Nykanen won the Emmy for Investigative Journalism in the Segments category for his on-camera reporting for Military Medicine, an exposé on malpractice in the U.S. military that aired on NBC Nightly News. Nykanen also investigated the use of dangerous pesticides and the regulatory failures of the FDA, for which he won an Emmy. He retired from NBC in 1988. Following this, he spent some years providing news copy for the television show Hard Copy, including the writing and directing of much of its coverage of the O. J. Simpson trial. He also later wrote for the Lifetime television show Beyond Chance.

In 2020, Nykanen began hosting and producing XRTV-Victoria, a half-hour monthly show that examines the climate crisis with news and science about the emergency. It has also provided behind-the-scenes coverage of logging road blockades to save ancient trees in the renowned Fairy Creek watershed on Vancouver Island, British Columbia.

== Politics ==
In 1992 Nykanen served as the press secretary to Jerry Brown during his bid for the Democratic nomination for President. In that role, he discussed with the media Brown's expectations in the primaries and election results, as well as other questions regarding his campaign.

== Novels ==
Mark Nykanen's novels have been translated into French, German, Italian, Czech, Dutch, Russian, and Mandarin. His first novel was the 1998 book Hush. The work began as a short story based upon a nightmare he had while suffering from a fever, which his literary agent encouraged him to turn into a novel. The plot tells the story of a homicidal child abuser in Oregon who seeks to silence a woman trying to expose his crimes. She discovers his violent past while working as an art therapist with one of his young victims.

Nykanen's next novel was The Bone Parade, released in 2004. It tells the story of a serial-killer sculptor who uses the bodies of his victims in his art. The book is written from both third-person and first-persons points of view, with the first-person sections representing the internal dialogue and mindset of the murderer. The German translation became a best-seller in Germany. In 2005 Nykanen then released the novel Search Angel, which follows the story of an investigator who helps adoptees looking for their birth parents—and the parallel story of a serial killer who targets women who gave their children up for adoption. The murderer then stalks the investigator herself after discovering she had given up a child earlier in her life. In 2009, he released the novel Primitive, the story of a middle-aged model who is kidnapped by eco-renegades and held captive in their secluded compound. In 2011, he published Striking Back, about a serial killer who murders members of a therapist's spousal abuse support group.

The same year, under the pseudonym "James Jaros", Nykanen published the post-apocalyptic novel Burn Down the Sky, based on a world decimated by climate change and a killer virus. In 2012, he released the novel Carry the Flame under the same pen name, which follows the story of a caravan of people braving a scorched American Midwest populated by roving bands of violent outlaws. Both novels take place in a world where global warming has wrought catastrophic change.

== Personal life ==
In addition to Nykanen's continued anti-war protests, he has been involved in public debates about climate change science. During 2003 he and his wife moved to Canada in protest of the US invasion of Iraq. In 2015 they moved back to the U.S. In 2017, Nykanen and his wife returned to Canada, stating the reason was the result of the 2016 presidential election. He and his wife hold citizenship in both countries. Nykanen was married to Lucinda Taylor, who works as a health and family counselor. He died of a heart attack on September 16, 2022.

== Recognition ==
Nykanen received four Emmy awards over his career, an Edgar Allan Poe Award, and shared a Dupont-Columbia Award for Investigative Journalism. In 2018, Nykanen appeared on the show United Shades of America.
