= Jansing and Company =

MSNBC weekday morning news program (2010-2014)

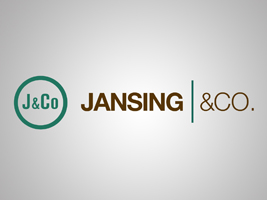
- Presented by: Chris Jansing; Richard Lui
- Country of origin: United States
- Original language: English

Production
- Running time: 60 minutes

Original release
- Network: MSNBC
- Release: October 4, 2010 – June 13, 2014

Jansing and Company is a weekday morning news and information program that aired on MSNBC from 2010 to 2014. The show aired weekdays at 10 am ET. Chris Jansing hosted the program with Richard Lui serving as in-studio correspondent.

The show debuted on Monday October 4, 2010 and served as the beginning of MSNBC's dayside news coverage.

The show ended on June 13, 2014, when Jansing became NBC's Senior White House Correspondent.
