= And So It Goes (book) =

1986 book

And So It Goes: Adventures in Television
- Author: Linda Ellerbee
- Language: English
- Subject: Television, news broadcasting, journalism
- Genre: Non-fiction
- Published: 1986
- Publisher: G. P. Putnam's Sons
- Publication place: United States
- Pages: 255
- ISBN: 0-399-13047-0

And So It Goes: Adventures in Television is a 1986 memoir written by American journalist Linda Ellerbee that was on The New York Times Best Seller list. The book's title is taken from Ellerbee's nightly sign-off, "And so it goes", at the end of NBC News Overnight, which she co-anchored with Bill Schechner.

== Overview ==
The book follows the chronology of Linda Ellerbee's television news career.

== Critical reception ==
The New York Times, "There are many good stories in 'And So It Goes.' The book was also praised for being "witty and irreverent."

Los Angeles Times, "Linda Ellerbee came to Hollywood this week to promote her first book, “And So It Goes,” a sardonic, light-hearted account of her years in TV news."

Kirkus Reviews, "Ellerbee's career has shown that TV news can be fun without being vapid; these behind-the-scenes anecdotes show that what didn't make it on the air was even funnier."
