= Peter Frank (art critic) =

American art critic, curator, and poet

- Born: 1950 (age 75–76); New York, New York, U.S.
- Education: Columbia University
- Occupations: Art critic; curator
- Father: Reuven Frank

Peter Solomon Frank (born 1950, New York) is an American art critic, curator, and poet who lives and works in Los Angeles. Frank is known for curating shows at the Solomon R. Guggenheim Museum in the 1970s and 1980s. He has worked curatorially for Documenta, the Venice Biennale, Museo Nacional Centro de Arte Reina Sofía, and many other national and international venues.

== Early life ==
Frank was born in New York to Reuven Frank, who was an Emmy Award-winning President of NBC News and Bernice Frank, née Kaplow, a music librarian at the Tenafly Public Library. He received his B.A. and M.A. in art history from Columbia University.

== Work ==
Frank contributes articles to numerous publications and has written many monographs and catalogs for one person and group exhibitions. In his early career he was somewhat associated with the Fluxus movement in New York. He has also organized many theme and survey shows for placement at institutions throughout the world, taught at colleges and universities and lectured in North America and Europe. He was the Senior Curator at the Riverside Art Museum and an art critic for Angeleno magazine. He is a frequent contributor to The Huffington Post, Art in America, ARTnews, and Whitehot Magazine. Until July 9, 2008, he was a long-time critic for LA Weekly. He was a past editor of Visions Art Quarterly and was an art critic for The Village Voice and The SoHo Weekly News in New York.

== Publications ==
- Frank, Peter: "Plural Isms: California Art and Artists of the Mid- to Late 1970s". Under the Big Black Sun, Museum of Contemporary Art, Los Angeles (MOCA), 2011.
- Frank, Peter: "Context, Attitude, Community: The Early Years of the UCI Art Department", Best Kept Secret: UCI and the Development of Contemporary Art in Southern California. Laguna Art Museum, Laguna, California, 2011.
- Frank, Peter: "Young Fluxus". Published by Artists Space / Open Studio, Barrytown, 1982.
