= So It Goes =

So It Goes may refer to:

- "So it goes", a recurring refrain in Kurt Vonnegut's 1969 novel Slaughterhouse-Five

== Music ==
=== Albums ===
- So It Goes (Perry Como album) or the title song, 1983
- So It Goes (Ratking album) or the title song, 2014

=== Songs ===
- "So It Goes" (song), by Nick Lowe, 1976
- "So It Goes...", by Taylor Swift, 2017
- "So It Goes", by Corey Hart from Young Man Running, 1988
- "So It Goes", by the Verve from A Northern Soul, 1995
- "So It Goes", by Nebula from Atomic Ritual, 2003
- "So It Goes", by the Menzingers from Chamberlain Waits, 2010
- "So It Goes", by Mac Miller from Swimming, 2018

== Television ==
- So It Goes (TV series), a 1976–1977 British music show
- "So It Goes" (Halt and Catch Fire), a 2017 episode
- "So It Goes" (Madam Secretary), a 2014 episode
- "So It Goes" (NCIS), a 2014 episode

== Other ==
- So It Goes, newsletter by Stephen Thomas Erlewine

== See also ==
- And So It Goes (disambiguation)
