= Andrea Mitchell Reports =

News show on MSNBC hosted by American journalist Andrea Mitchell

- Starring: Andrea Mitchell
- Country of origin: United States
- No. of episodes: Unknown

Production
- Running time: 60 minutes

Original release
- Network: MSNBC
- Release: April 7, 2008 – February 7, 2025

Andrea Mitchell Reports is a news show on MSNBC that was broadcast weekdays at 12 pm ET/9 am PT hosted by Andrea Mitchell. She originally was an anchor under the MSNBC Live umbrella before getting her own distinct show, although as of March 2021, the program is branded as part of its successor MSNBC Reports (with its overall branding being modeled after Andrea Mitchell Reports). She is NBC News’ Chief Foreign Affairs correspondent. While the show is based in Washington, D.C., it typically went on location to where Mitchell is reporting for NBC News.

== History ==
Andrea Mitchell's show featured special coverage of the DNC Convention in 2008.

In September 2008, Megan Garber of Columbia Journalism Review questioned whether or not Andrea Mitchell should be reporting on the economic downturn, due to possible conflicts of interests.

In September 2011, Mitchell announced to her audience on Andrea Mitchell Reports that she had breast cancer.

Subrata De was named the show's executive producer in January 2012, replacing Jennifer Suozzo, who became senior broadcast producer of NBC Nightly News. De left MSNBC to join ABC News in June 2014.

A June 18, 2012, segment originally aired on MSNBC's Way Too Early with Willie Geist was reaired on Andrea Mitchell Reports and criticized for taking Mitt Romney's comments at a campaign stop in Pennsylvania out of context.

In March 2021, Andrea Mitchell Reports was folded into MSNBC's newly rebranded rolling news block MSNBC Reports, whose individual programs took on a similar naming scheme with their anchor's name.

On October 29, 2024, Mitchell announced that she would step down from the program in January 2025 to focus more on her role as an NBC News correspondent. Her final show aired on February 7, 2025, and her hour was later taken over by Chris Jansing on May 5, 2025.

== Substitute hosts ==
On March 2, 2009, Savannah Guthrie anchored while Andrea Mitchell was en route to Jerusalem, Israel. On some occasions when Mitchell is out the show is suspended and MSNBC Live airs in its place featuring rotating anchors.

Former NBC News congressional correspondent Luke Russert formerly filled in for Mitchell on occasion.

Preceded by MSNBC Reports	MSNBC Weekday Lineup; 12:00 pm – 1:00 pm (ET)	Succeeded by Chris Jansing Reports
