= Skypath =

System used by the NBC television network to distribute programming to affiliates

Skypath is a system the NBC television network uses to distribute satellite programming to its affiliate stations.

Launched in January 1984, Skypath (whose lead developer was Richard Edmondson at NBC's New York Rockefeller Center offices) was the first such system of its kind. Its main hub consisted of East Coast, West Coast, and affiliate feeds located on the K_{u} band RCA Satcom K2 satellite, with one C-band transponder located on RCA's now-defunct Satcom 1R. It was conceived because of concerns that the breakup of AT&T would escalate long lines rates for sending programs across the country. By 1987, the network fed 177 affiliate stations via Skypath.

In 1988, NBC began to encrypt their Skypath affiliate feeds with Leitch encryption. By the mid-1990s, such encryption was limited to NFL football games.

One of the feeds on the Skypath system was NBC Skycom, used for general internal "closed-circuit" video and news feeds between NBC and its local affiliates. Skycom operated in the fashion of a "video news wire" service (much in the same vein as CBS' NewsNet/NewsPath and ABC's DEF (Daily Electronic Feed) and NewsOne services) that provided news story packages and other material (such as promos, especially ones "personalized" by NBC for a local affiliate station) originated by both NBC and local NBC affiliates across the nation to be used by other affiliates.

Prior to the arrival of Skypath, NBC programming, with the exception of The Tonight Show Starring Johnny Carson, was delivered via coaxial cable and microwave transmission through the facilities of AT&T (however, NBC did have limited satellite delivery on an experimental basis via their C-band transponder on Satcom F1 beginning with the satellite's launch in 1975). Beginning in the early 1980s, The Tonight Show began satellite delivery to the East Coast.

In 1997, NBC began the transition of Skypath to digital transmission. The new system, completed in 2002, also allowed the network to send HD and regionalized feeds to the affiliates.

As of 2005, Skypath exists on the SES Americom Ku-Band AMC-1 and AMC-8 satellites, NBC having discontinued the analog C-band feed in 1998. All of the feeds are now broadcast via Digital Video Broadcasting (DVB).
