= William Clotworthy =

American television censor (1926–2021)

William Griffith Clotworthy (January 13, 1926 – August 19, 2021) was an American television censor and author. He was the primary censor for Saturday Night Live from 1979 to 1991. In addition to his television work, he authored several books on American history.

== Career ==
=== Early career ===
Clotworthy was born in Westfield, New Jersey. He served in the U.S. Navy during World War II, and later benefited from the GI Bill, attending Wesleyan University and Yale University. He ultimately graduated from Syracuse University in 1948 with a degree in theater. After graduation, he was an NBC page for eight months.

=== Advertising ===
Clotworthy spent 28 years in the advertising industry before his career as a television censor. He joined BBDO (Batten, Barton, Durstine & Osborn), a New York City advertising agency, in 1950, largely working in television and radio matters. In this role he was the ad liaison for many shows, including You Bet Your Life, Your Hit Parade, and General Electric Theater starring future President Ronald Reagan. He later moved to the California office where his responsibilities were expanded. He left BBDO in the late 1970s.

=== Television censor ===
Following this, Clotworthy returned to NBC to become an executive for standards and practices. He was the NBC Director of Broadcast Standards from 1979 to 1991. His nickname at SNL was "Doctor No".

== Personal life and death ==
Clotworthy died on August 19, 2021, at the age of 95, in Salt Lake City, Utah. His death was announced by his son Robert. He had been in hospice care.

== Books ==
- Homes and Libraries of the Presidents (McDonald & Woodward, 1995)
- Presidential Sites: A Directory of Places Associated with Presidents of the United States (University of Nebraska Press, 1996)
- Saturday Night Live: Equal Opportunity Offender: The Uncensored Censor (Author House, 2001)
- In the Footsteps of George Washington: A Guide to Sites Commemorating Our First President (University of Nebraska Press, 2002)
- Homes of the First Ladies: A Guide to Publicly Accessible Homes, Museums, and Related Sites (McDonald & Woodward, 2010)
