= Mike Leonard (journalist) =

American journalist

Michael P. Leonard (born November 30, 1947, in Paterson, New Jersey) is a retired Emmy Award winning American television journalist, NYT best-selling author, filmmaker and public speaker. Leonard was a 32-year NBC-TV national network correspondent and regular contributor to the Today Show. He is known for his uniquely creative style and his stories on everyday life.

== Works ==
- Leonard, Mike (2006-04-16). The Ride of Our Lives: Roadside lessons of an American family (1st ed.). New York: Ballantine Books. ISBN 0-345-48148-8.

== Footnotes ==
1. G.I. Joe Connection
