= Monitor (American TV program) =

Monitor is an American newsmagazine television program which premiered on NBC on March 12, 1983. It was named after the earlier NBC Radio series of the same name. NBC News created this program as a platform to possibly challenge the success of CBS's 60 Minutes. After being initially broadcast on Saturdays at 10 P.M. Eastern time, the program was moved to Sundays at 7 P.M. Eastern time for its second season, going head-to-head with 60 Minutes, and was renamed First Camera.

== Overview ==
Production was based in Washington, D.C., with offices in the Tenley Circle area immediately east of NBC's Nebraska Avenue studios. Lloyd Dobyns, the show's anchor, appeared on a stark white, modernistic set. In the absence of a theme composed especially for the show, the producers opted to use the opening minute of "Piano Concerto No. 1 In D-Flat Major, Op. 10: I Allegro brioso" by Sergei Prokofiev, feeling that it added gravitas to the show—something they hoped would set them apart from ABC's lightweight 20/20.

In test audiences (including one in which future NBC anchor Sarah James was a college student), the show did not test well, but producers refused to change the format. The first episode featured an extended story on Bobby Czyz, a light heavyweight boxer from New Jersey. The show placed last in its time period in national ratings in its debut and was one of the least-watched programs in all of prime time. Additionally, the Prokofiev score brought complaints and was compared to a funeral dirge. Reporters that worked on the program included Mark Nykanen.

In an attempt to boost the program's abysmal ratings for the fall 1983 season, NBC added new theme music and a new set with a den-like appearance that included bookshelves, a high-back desk chair and a handmade, French provincial desk with a word processor on top (the same model Dobyns reportedly used to write on in his office and at home); additionally, NBC changed the series's title to First Camera. However, none of the changes were able to draw in viewers, and its new time slot only damaged ratings further; seeing no hope of successfully competing against the powerhouse 60 Minutes, 7 percent of NBC affiliates declined to carry the revamped show, and it was further hurt by frequent pre-emptions due to football run-overs. As a result, First Camera was removed from the NBC schedule several months after the makeover, its last episode airing April 1, 1984.
