= Sekou Smith =

American sportswriter (1972–2021)

- Born: Sekou Kimathi Sinclair Smith; May 15, 1972; Grand Rapids, Michigan, U.S.
- Died: January 26, 2021 (aged 48); Marietta, Georgia, U.S.
- Education: Jackson State University
- Occupation: Sportswriter
- Spouse: Heather
- Children: 3

Sekou Kimathi Sinclair Smith (May 15, 1972 – January 26, 2021) was an American sportswriter who covered the National Basketball Association (NBA).

== Early life and education ==
Smith was a native of Grand Rapids, Michigan. He graduated from Jackson State University in 1997 with a bachelor's degree in communications.

== Career ==
He covered college football, basketball, and baseball for The Clarion-Ledger from 1994 until 2001, during his university studies and after. Smith was an NBA beat writer for four years each at The Indianapolis Star and The Atlanta Journal-Constitution. He started working at Turner Broadcasting as a senior analyst for NBA Digital in November 2009. He also worked as the creator and author of Sekou Smith's Hang Time Blog on NBA.com, a host of The Hang Time Podcast, and a Senior Analyst on NBA TV’s The Beat. Smith was one of the small number of journalists inside the NBA's bubble at the Walt Disney World Resort in Orlando, Florida, covering the 2020 playoffs and the NBA Finals.

Smith mentored many colleagues as a member of the National Association of Black Journalists.

== Personal life and death ==
Smith was married to his wife, Heather, with whom he had three children.

He died of complications from COVID-19 in Marietta, Georgia, on January 26, 2021, at the age of 48.
