= Billy Fuccillo =

American automobile dealership owner (1956–2021)

William Bruce Fuccillo
- Born: January 9, 1956; Greenport, Suffolk County, New York
- Died: June 17, 2021 (aged 65); Sarasota, Florida
- Other names: Billy
- Occupation: Car Dealer
- Known for: "Huge!" Advertising Catchphrase

William Bruce "Billy" Fuccillo Sr. (January 9, 1956 – June 17, 2021) was an American car dealer who ran a network of car dealerships called the Fuccillo Automotive Group.

== Biography ==
Fuccillo was born in Greenport, Suffolk County, New York in 1956. He graduated from Syracuse University in 1978 with a degree in marketing. Following college, he worked at various car dealerships. In 1989, he went out on his own and opened his first dealership. Over time, the business grew to over 25 dealerships in New York and Florida selling a variety of brands. His trademark saying is "it's HUGE!", which is often drawn out in his advertisements. Tom Park, Fuccillo's production director and the straight man in many of the company's commercials until 2018, remarked that Fuccillo had originally ad libbed the line in response to the strong turnout to a sales event, and that the two liked it so much that they used it as their trademark from that point onward.

Fuccillo died in his Florida home on June 17, 2021, after months of declining health and battling a long-term illness. Park died almost exactly one year later.
