= Linda Ellerbee =

American journalist (born 1944)

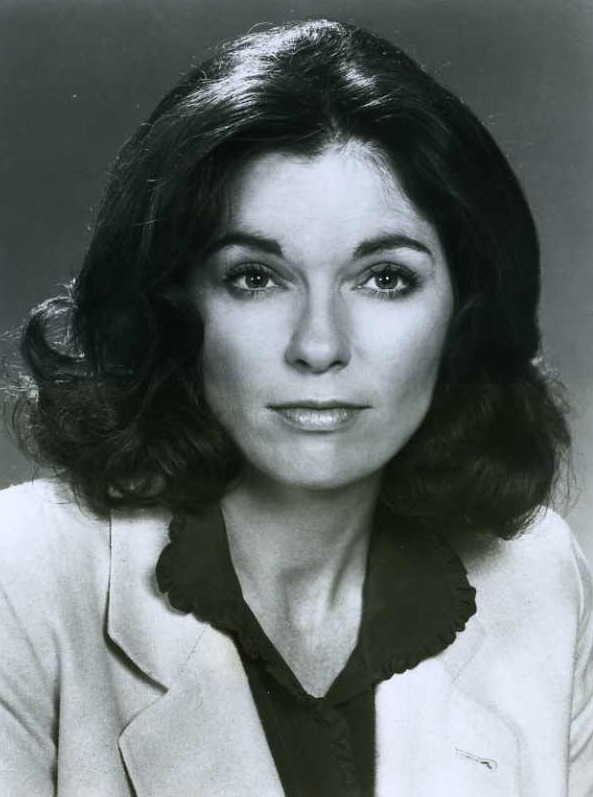
- Ellerbee in 1978
- Born: Linda Jane Smith; August 15, 1944 (age 82); Bryan, Texas, U.S.
- Occupations: Journalist; author; news reporter; news anchor
- Years active: 1965–2015; 2020–present
- Known for: NBC News Overnight, Our World, Nick News
- Spouses: Mac Smith (m. 1964; div. 1966) Van Kenneth Veselka (m. 1968; div. 1971) Tom Ellerbee (m. 1973; div. 1975) John David Klein (m. 1975; div. 1983) Rolfe Tessem (m. 1985)
- Children: 2

Linda Ellerbee (born Linda Jane Smith; August 15, 1944) is an American journalist, anchor, producer, reporter, author, speaker and commentator, noted as longtime Washington correspondent for NBC News and host of NBC News Overnight. She is widely known as the twenty-five year host of Nick News, Nickelodeon's highly rated and recognized news program for older school-aged children and teens that addressed substantive issues, including wars, disease and disasters, without condescension.

Ellerbee's work on NBC News Overnight was recognized by the jurors of the duPont Columbia Awards as "possibly the best written and most intelligent news program ever." Described as literate, smart, unapologetic, assertive and keenly observant, Ellerbee formally retired in 2015, after 44 years in journalism.

== Early life and education ==
Ellerbee was born Linda Jane Smith in Bryan, Texas. She attended River Oaks Elementary School, Lanier Middle School, and Lamar High School in Houston.

She also attended Vanderbilt University in Nashville, Tennessee, dropping out in 1964. Ellerbee traveled around the country for some time afterward, working itinerant jobs in radio. Ellerbee wrote:

I moved around some, married some, had two babies, worked for three radio stations, one of which hired me to read the news because I sounded black—my Texas heritage—and the black woman it had hired did not... In radio, I learned about keeping logs, editing audiotape, writing copy, selling air time, announcing, and "running a board," which sounds one hell of a lot more sporting than it is.

== Career ==
After a stint working for Terry Miller, majority leader of the Alaska Senate, Ellerbee was hired by the Dallas bureau of the Associated Press to write copy. She claims to have been fired after writing a catty personal letter on the AP's word processors and accidentally sending the letter out on the wire. The letter brought her to the attention of Houston CBS television affiliate KHOU-TV, which hired her to replace Jessica Savitch in January 1973. Within several months, she was hired by New York's WCBS-TV.

At NBC, Ellerbee worked as a reporter on Today. Her first anchor job was on the prime-time version of Weekend. Ellerbee joined Lloyd Dobyns as co-host of Weekend when the show moved from its late-night time slot (where it rotated with Saturday Night Live, generally one Saturday night per month) into direct prime time competition with CBS's 60 Minutes. As with the late-night incarnation, they would sign-off with the phrase "And so it goes."

In 1982, Ellerbee was again teamed with Dobyns (and later Bill Schechner) as hosts of NBC News Overnight, where their trademark writing style made the show somewhat reminiscent of their stint on Weekend. They ended each broadcast with a short, usually wry, commentary, again signing off with the catch-phrase "And so it goes", which later became the title of her first memoir. While at NBC, Ellerbee worked with Jessica Savitch; when Savitch's drug problems became apparent Ellerbee tried to organize an intervention, but Savitch died before that happened.

In 1984, after the cancellation of Overnight, Ellerbee moved to Summer Sunday USA, as co-anchor with Andrea Mitchell, the first time a prime-time network news program was co-anchored by two women. She was then a correspondent for Today before moving to rival network ABC in 1986. There she served as a reporter for the morning program Good Morning America. At ABC, Ellerbee was able to co-write and co-anchor (with Ray Gandolf) Our World, a weekly primetime historical series. She won an Emmy Award for her work on that program.

In 1987, Ellerbee and her husband and business partner Rolfe Tessem left network news to start their own production company, Lucky Duck Productions. The company has produced programs for every major cable network, and has as its flagship program Nick News, a news program for children on Nickelodeon. That show has received many awards: three Peabody Awards (including one personal Peabody given to Ellerbee for her coverage of the Clinton investigation), another duPont Columbia Award and three Emmys. In 2004, Ellerbee was honored with an Emmy for her WE: Women's Entertainment network series When I Was a Girl.

In 1989, Ellerbee guest-starred as herself in an episode of the sitcom Murphy Brown. The episode "Summer of '77" referenced that Ellerbee had auditioned for the anchor job which eventually went to the title character, played by Candice Bergen. In the episode, Murphy Brown also accuses Ellerbee of stealing the catchphrase "And so it goes" from her during a long-haul flight. The two reminisce, with Ellerbee saying she might like to go back to an old network job, and Brown wanting to take some time off to write a book. Both reply with "Nahh".

Also in 1989, Ellerbee created a minor uproar by appearing in television commercials for Maxwell House coffee. The New York Times said the commercials were poorly done even as advertisements, but also betrayed her trademark "uncompromising intellectual honesty" and "sardonic wit"—and were mercenary, "devaluing both broadcast news and broadcast advertising." Because of the format of the commercials, set with a mock anchor's background, Advertising Age said "this is advertising news disguised as NBC news." Ellerbee would later share that journalist Jimmy Breslin called to supportively remind her that when he made a beer commercial, they let him keep his Pulitzer Prize.

In 1991, Nickelodeon president Geraldine Laybourne approached Ellerbee about producing a special that would explain the Gulf War to children. The special led to the Nick News series, which Ellerbee hosted until her retirement in 2015. The show covered serious topics like HIV/AIDS, school shootings, terrorism and the impeachment of president Bill Clinton.

=== Writing ===
Ellerbee's first memoir, titled And So It Goes: Adventures in Television, was published in 1986. A second book of memoirs, Move On: Adventures in the Real World, was published in 1991 and a third, Take Big Bites: Adventures Around the World and Across the Table, in 2005. In addition, she has authored an eight-part series of Girl Reporter books for young people, as well as a syndicated newspaper column.

== Cancer survivor ==
In 1992, Ellerbee was diagnosed with breast cancer and had a double mastectomy. Afterwards, she spent much of her time speaking to groups about how she fought the cancer and how women need to fight the disease, demand better medical treatment, and maintain a healthy sense of humor.

== Employment ==
=== National television and film ===
- Reporter, the Washington bureau of NBC News, 1976–1978
- Co-anchor, network news magazine Weekend , 1978–1979
- Correspondent, NBC Nightly News, 1979–1982
- Co-anchor, NBC News Overnight, 1982–1984
- Co-anchor, Summer Sunday USA, 1984
- Reporter, Today, 1984–1986
- Reporter, Good Morning America, 1986
- Anchor, Our World, 1986–1987
- Narrator, Baby Boom, 1987
- President, Lucky Duck Productions, since 1987
- Commentator, CNN, 1989
- Producer, writer, and host, Nick News with Linda Ellerbee 1992–2015

=== Radio, local television, print, and online ===
- Disc jockey at WSDM Chicago 1965–1968
- Program director, KSJO San Francisco, 1967–1968
- Reporter, KJNO Juneau, Alaska, 1969–1972
- News writer, Associated Press in Dallas, Texas, 1972
- Television reporter, KHOU in Houston, 1972–1973
- General assignment reporter, WCBS-TV in New York City, 1973–1976
- Writer, host, On the Record
- On-line production with Microsoft, since 1996
- Panelist, The Roundtable, WAMC, 2020–

== Bibliography ==
=== Non-fiction ===
- Ellerbee, Linda (1986). And So It Goes: Adventures in Television. G.P. Putnam's Sons. ISBN 0-399-13047-0.
- Ellerbee, Linda (1991). Move On: Adventures in the Real World. HarperPerennial. ISBN 0-06-097469-9.
- Ellerbee, Linda (2006). Take Big Bites: Adventures Around the World and Across the Table. Putnam's Sons. ISBN 0-425-20973-3.

=== Fiction ===
- Ellerbee, Linda (2000). Girl Reporter Blows Lid Off Town! (Get Real, No. 1). HarperCollins. ISBN 0-06-440755-1.
- Ellerbee, Linda (2000). Girl Reporter Sinks School! (Get Real, No. 2). Harper Collins. ISBN 0-06-440756-X.
- Ellerbee, Linda (2000). Girl Reporter Stuck in Jam! (Get Real, No. 3). HarperCollins. ISBN 0-06-440757-8.
- Ellerbee, Linda (2000). Girl Reporter Snags Crush! (Get Real, No. 4). HarperCollins. ISBN 0-06-440758-6.
- Ellerbee, Linda (2000). Ghoul Reporter Digs Up Zombies! (Get Real, No. 5). Avon/HarperCollins Publishers. ISBN 0-06-440759-4.
- Ellerbee, Linda (2000). Girl Reporter Rocks Polls! (Get Real, No. 6). HarperCollins. ISBN 0-06-440760-8.
- Ellerbee, Linda (2000). Girl Reporter Gets the Skinny! (Get Real, No. 7). ISBN 0-06-440951-1.
- Ellerbee, Linda (2001). Girl Reporter Bytes Back! (Get Real, No. 8). HarperCollins. ISBN 0-06-440952-X.

== Accolades ==
- 1992 NOW NYC's Women of Power & Influence Award
- 1998 Personal Peabody Award
- 2011: Paul White Award, Radio Television Digital News Association
