= Andrea Mitchell =

American journalist and news anchor (born 1946)

- Mitchell in 2026
- Born: October 30, 1946 (age 80); New Rochelle, New York, U.S.
- Education: University of Pennsylvania (BA)
- Occupation: News anchor
- Years active: 1967–present
- Notable credit(s): NBC News Chief Foreign Affairs Correspondent, NBC Nightly News, Today, Andrea Mitchell Reports
- Title: NBC News Chief Foreign Affairs Correspondent; NBC News Chief Washington Correspondent; Host, Andrea Mitchell Reports
- Spouses: Gil Jackson (ann. 1966); Alan Greenspan (m. 1997; died 2026)

Andrea Louise Mitchell (born October 30, 1946) is an American television journalist, anchor and commentator for NBC News, based in Washington, D.C.

She is NBC News' chief foreign affairs and chief Washington correspondent, reporting on the 2008 presidential election campaign for NBC News broadcasts, including NBC Nightly News with Lester Holt, Today, and MSNBC. She anchored Andrea Mitchell Reports, which aired from noon to 1 p.m. ET weekdays on MSNBC. On October 29, 2024, in closing remarks on her show, Mitchell announced she would be leaving the full time anchor chair in early 2025. She will remain in her role as chief foreign affairs correspondent.

Mitchell has both appeared on and guest-hosted Meet the Press. She was also often a guest on Hardball with Chris Matthews and The Rachel Maddow Show.

In 2019, Mitchell earned a Lifetime Achievement Emmy for her journalistic work.

== Early life ==
Mitchell was raised in a Jewish family from New Rochelle, New York, the daughter of Sydney Mitchell, a businessman, and his wife, Cecile Mitchell. Her family's original surname was Metchik. The family is of Russian-Jewish descent.

Her father was the chief executive officer and partial owner of a furniture manufacturing company in Manhattan. He was also the president of Beth El Synagogue in New Rochelle for 40 years. Her mother was an administrator at the New York Institute of Technology in Manhattan. Her brother Arthur and his wife, Nancy Mitchell, moved to British Columbia in the 1970s. He has dual American and Canadian citizenship, becoming a member of the Legislative Assembly of Yukon and the leader of the Yukon Liberal Party in the 2000s.

Mitchell is a graduate of New Rochelle High School. She went on to attend the University of Pennsylvania, where she received a Bachelor of Arts degree in English literature in 1967. While at Penn, she served as news director of student radio station WXPN.

== Career ==
Staying in Philadelphia after graduation, Mitchell was hired as a reporter at KYW radio. She rose to prominence as the station's City Hall correspondent during Mayor Frank Rizzo's administration, and also reported for sister station KYW-TV. In 1976, Mitchell moved to CBS affiliate WTOP (now WUSA) in Washington, D.C.

=== NBC News and MSNBC ===
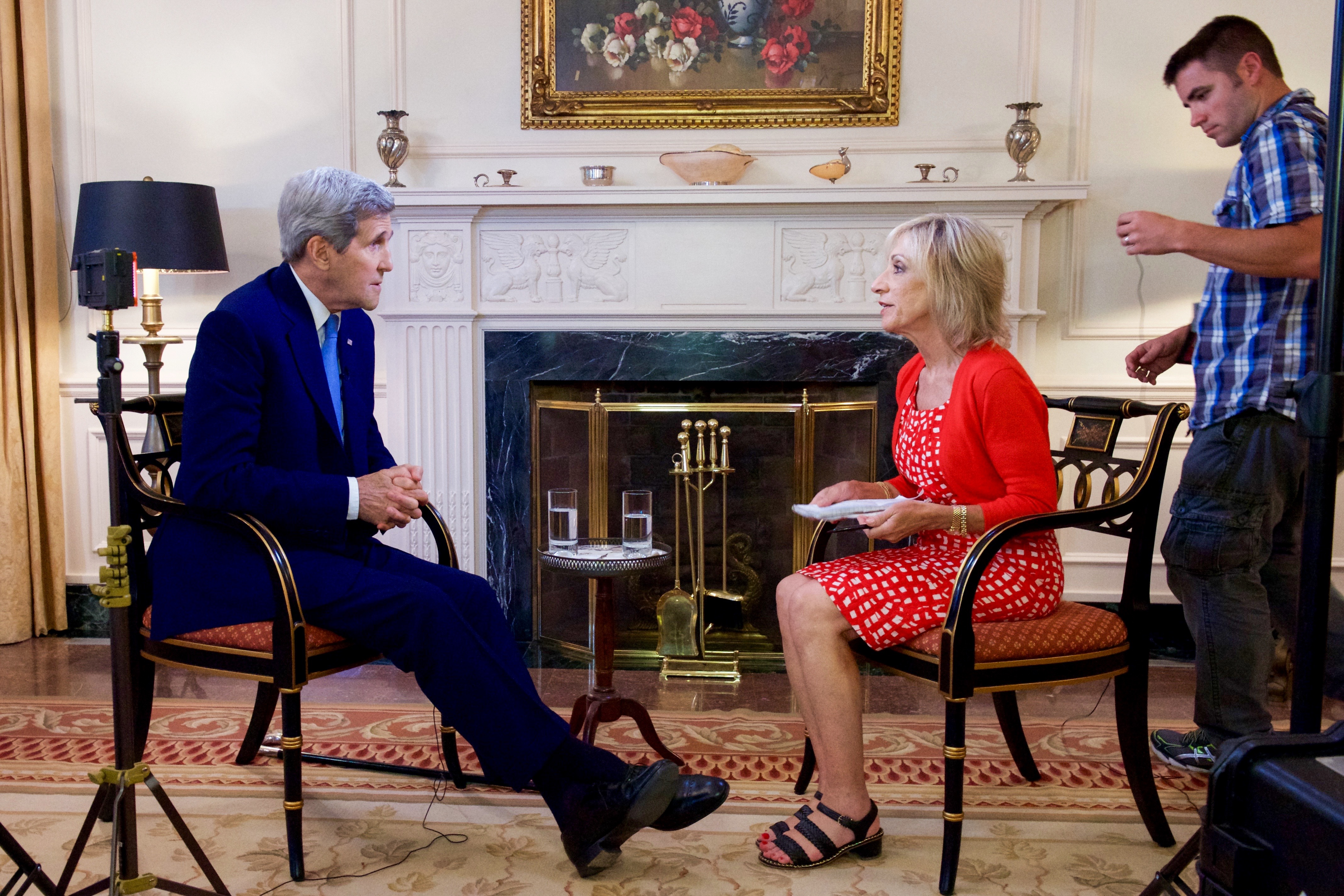
Mitchell interviewing Secretary of State John Kerry in 2015

In July 1978, Mitchell moved to NBC's network news operation, serving as a general correspondent. In 1979, she was named NBC's energy correspondent, reporting on the late-1970s energy crisis and the Three Mile Island nuclear accident. Mitchell covered the White House from 1981 through 1988, when she became NBC's chief Congressional correspondent. In 1984 she and Linda Ellerbee coanchored Summer Sunday USA, the first prime-time television news series coanchored by two women. In 1992, she was named NBC's chief White House correspondent, holding that position until November 1994. Mitchell has served as the network's chief foreign affairs correspondent since 1994.

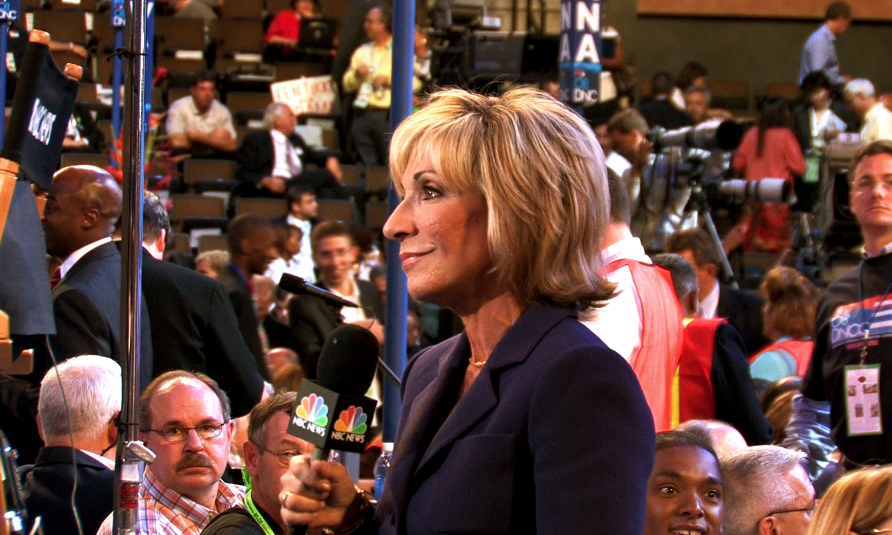
Mitchell reporting from the floor of the 2008 Democratic National Convention

From 2008 to 2025, Mitchell hosted Andrea Mitchell Reports on MSNBC. She stepped down from that position on February 7, 2025, but will remain NBC News's chief Washington correspondent and chief foreign affairs correspondent.

In 2005, Mitchell's memoir, Talking Back... to Presidents, Dictators, and Assorted Scoundrels, (ISBN 978-0-143-03873-3), was published. It chronicles her work as a journalist.

=== Controversies ===
==== Plame affair ====
A report in The Washington Post ("Bush Administration Is Focus of Inquiry CIA Agent's Identity Was Leaked to Media" by Mike Allen and Dana Priest, The Washington Post, September 28, 2003) that Mitchell had leaked Valerie Plame's identity led to her being questioned by the Federal Bureau of Investigation.

In October 2003, on the Capitol, Mitchell said, "It was widely known amongst those of us who cover the intelligence community and who were actively engaged in trying to track down who among the foreign service community was the envoy to Niger. But, frankly, I wasn't aware of [Plame's] actual role at the CIA, and the fact that she had a covert role involving weapons of mass destruction, not until Bob Novak wrote it."

==== Sudanese incident ====
During a July 2005 news conference in Khartoum, Mitchell was forcibly ejected from a room after asking Sudanese President Omar al-Bashir some pointed questions. They included: "Can you tell us why the violence is continuing?" (referring to genocide in Sudan's Darfur province) and "Can you tell us why the government is supporting the militias (Janjaweed)?" "Why should Americans believe your promises?"

After the incident, Mitchell said, "It is our job to ask. They can always say 'no comment' ... but to drag a reporter out just for asking is inexcusable behavior."

Before the incident, Sudanese officials had expressed reservations about allowing American newspaper or television reporters to join the Sudanese press pool. Sean McCormack, the State Department's assistant secretary for public affairs, said to his Sudanese counterpart, "I'll convey your desires about not permitting reporters to ask questions, but that's all I'll do. We have a free press." McCormack's Sudanese counterpart replied, "There is no freedom of the press here."

==== Offensive remarks ====
During an appearance on MSNBC on June 5, 2008, Mitchell referred to the voters of the southwest Virginia region as rednecks. On June 9, she apologized on air, saying "I owe an apology to the good people of Bristol, Virginia, for something stupid that I said last week. I was trying to explain, based on reporting from Democratic strategists, why Barack Obama was campaigning in southwest Virginia, but without attribution or explanation, I used a term strategists often use to demean an entire community. No excuses, I'm really sorry."

Having been led to believe that a clip showed that presidential candidate Mitt Romney was impressed by a touchscreen at a Wawa convenience store, Mitchell and contributor Chris Cillizza laughed when it was shown on Andrea Mitchell Reports, alluding to a widely held myth that George H. W. Bush was unfamiliar with a supermarket scanner in an incident during his 1992 campaign. She suggested this might be Romney's "supermarket scanner moment." She said, "I get the feeling that Mitt Romney has not been in too many Wawas along the roadside of Pennsylvania." The full clip puts his comments in the context of his claim that Wawa's "touchtone keypads" (touchscreens) show efficiency in the private sector compared to his statement that it took multiple filings of a 33-page government form for an optometrist to change his address.

Mitchell briefly addressed complaints from the Republican National Committee and Romney's campaign the following day. Introducing the full clip, Mitchell stated, "The RNC and the campaign both reached out to us, saying that Romney had more to say on that visit about federal bureaucracy and innovation in the private sector. We didn't get a chance to play that, so here it is now."

In February 2019, Mitchell characterized the Warsaw Ghetto Uprising as being against "the Polish and Nazi regimes." She apologized on Twitter for her comment. The Polish Institute of National Remembrance sued Mitchell in Polish court for alleging that Poland played a role in the Holocaust.

== Personal life ==
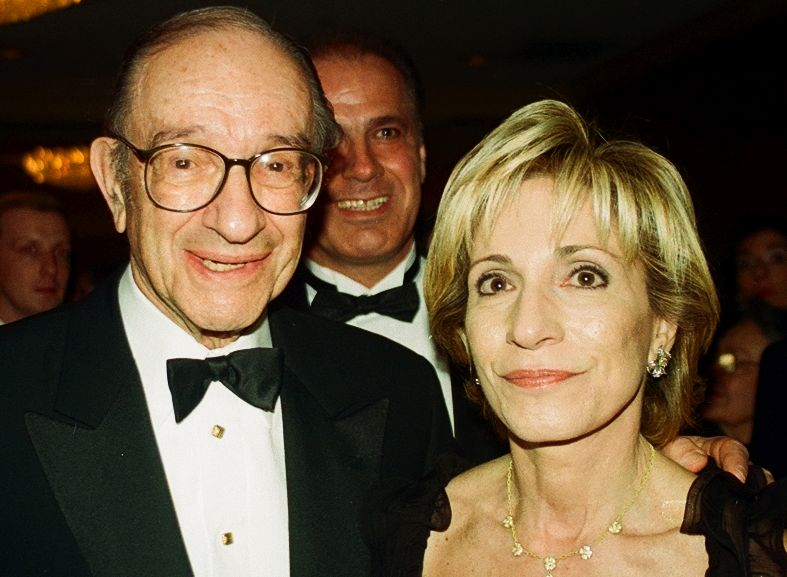
Mitchell with husband Alan Greenspan in 2000

She married her second husband, then Federal Reserve Chair Alan Greenspan, on April 6, 1997, following a lengthy relationship. Previously, she was married to Gil Jackson; that marriage ended in divorce in the mid-1970s.

On September 7, 2011, Mitchell revealed that she had been diagnosed with breast cancer during a doctor's visit a few weeks earlier. It was caught early and treated.

In 2017, Mitchell and Greenspan endowed the University of Pennsylvania with the "Andrea Mitchell Center for the Study of Democracy".

Greenspan died on June 22, 2026, due to complications from Parkinson's disease. He was 100 years old.

== See also ==
- List of University of Pennsylvania people

Preceded by John Palmer	NBC News Chief White House Correspondent	Succeeded by Brian Williams
