= Lloyd Dobyns =

American journalist (1936–2021)

- Born: Lloyd Allen Dobyns Jr. March 12, 1936; Newport News, Virginia, U.S.
- Died: August 22, 2021 (aged 85); Mebane, North Carolina, U.S.
- Education: Washington and Lee University
- Occupations: News reporter, correspondent

Lloyd Allen Dobyns Jr. (March 12, 1936 – August 22, 2021) was an American news reporter and correspondent. He worked for NBC from 1969 to 1986, hosting Weekend, NBC News Overnight, and Monitor.

== Early life ==
Dobyns was born in Newport News, Virginia, on March 12, 1936. He attended Fork Union Military Academy, graduating in the Class of 1953, and served as a lieutenant in the US Army for two years. He then studied journalism at Washington and Lee University, obtaining a Bachelor of Arts in 1957.

== Career ==
After graduating, Dobyns started his broadcasting career in his hometown with WDBJ. He went on to serve as an anchor at WAVY television in Portsmouth/Norfolk/Newport News in the 1960s, eventually becoming its news director. At the end of the decade, he relocated to New York, where he briefly worked for WNYW as managing editor.

Dobyns worked for NBC from 1969 to 1986. In 1980 he was a reporter on the successful TV documentary, If Japan can... Why can't we? about the reasons Japan was a manufacturing powerhouse as US industry struggled to keep up. He hosted Weekend from 1974 to 1979 and NBC News Overnight with Linda Ellerbee (1982-83) before being replaced by Bill Schechner. He was the anchor of NBC's short-lived, hour-long Monitor in 1983. The series was cancelled after receiving poor television ratings. He retired from NBC in 1986.

Dobyns subsequently got involved in the Total Quality Management movement, partnering with W. Edwards Deming. He later worked at the Norfolk Virginian-Pilot newspaper and taught journalism at Jacksonville State University in Jacksonville, Alabama, where served as the Ayers Chair in the Department of Communication from the late 1990s to the early 2000s.

== Later life ==
Dobyns began hosting podcasts for Colonial Williamsburg in 2005, interviewing various staff members about their particular specialty at the restored colonial capital of Virginia. He initially did not know what a podcast was, but warmed to the idea when he found out they were similar to the interviews he conducted in the past.

Dobyns died on August 22, 2021, in Mebane, North Carolina. Dobyns was preceded in death by his son, Brian, and his brother, Norman Dobyns. He was survived by his wife, Patti, three children: Denise, Alison and Kenneth, and eight grandchildren. He was 85, and suffered from complications caused by multiple strokes prior to his death.

== Awards ==
Dobyns won 28 national awards including a George Foster Peabody medal. In presenting a 1975 award to Weekend, the Peabody committee noted that, "Felicity of style and polished journalistic professionalism are the distinctive wellsprings at the source of 'Weekend', produced and written for NBC by Reuven Frank and Lloyd Dobyns. A once-a-month magazine of television, inquiring into the off-trail, 'Weekend' is hereby honored not only for its content, but also as an instructive example of how the language can be employed with grace and precision."

Dobyns' work also earned a DuPont-Columbia Award, a 1982 Humanitas Prize and two Christophers. In 1977 he was inducted into the Fork Union Military Academy Distinguished Alumni Hall of Fame. He was inducted into the Virginia Communications Hall of Fame in 2003. He was also granted an honorary doctorate of humane letters by the University of North Carolina.

== Books ==
Lloyd Dobyns co-authored two books with Clare Crawford-Mason:

- Quality or Else: The Revolution in World Business (1993) ISBN 0-395-63749-X
- Thinking About Quality: Progress, Wisdom, and the Deming Philosophy (1994) ISBN 0-7881-6989-0
