= Weekend (1974 TV program) =

1974 American television news magazine program

- Genre: News
- Presented by: Lloyd Dobyns; Linda Ellerbee
- Original language: English

Original release
- Network: NBC
- Release: 20 October 1974 – 1 September 1979

Weekend was an NBC news magazine hosted by Lloyd Dobyns. Weekend combined investigative reporting with light feature stories. The show premiered on Saturday, October 19, 1974, and ended on September 1, 1979. Weekend aired the first Saturday night of each month from 11:30 PM to 1 AM Eastern time. Reruns of The Tonight Show ran on the remaining Saturdays of each month.

Season 2 premiered on Saturday, October 4, 1975. The following weekend, sketch comedy series NBC's Saturday Night premiered. Due to the popularity of Weekend, that first SNL included a skit named "Weekend Update". This "tip-of-the-hat" to Weekend has been part of every SNL show since.

By the end of season 1, Weekend had attracted a cult following. Fans dubbed the first weekend of each month a Weekend weekend. "Is this a Weekend weekend?" was often heard around office water coolers.

== More ==
The program was hosted by Lloyd Dobyns, who also did much of the reporting. The show's creator and executive producer was past (and future) president of NBC News, Reuven Frank. Together, Dobyns and Frank were largely responsible for the distinctive writing and quirky style of the program. The opening theme was the guitar intro to "Jumpin' Jack Flash" by The Rolling Stones. As a forward-focused executive, Frank brought in a woman, Clare Crawford-Mason, as the show's producer.

In 1978, after four years of critical success and moderately good ratings for that hour, NBC moved Weekend to prime time. After airing once a month in various time slots in September, October, and November, the network placed the program weekly on Sunday nights at 10 P.M. Eastern time starting in December 1978. Linda Ellerbee was added as Dobyns' co-host and co-lead reporter. Placed against strong programs on ABC and CBS, the show eventually died of poor ratings. A few years later, Ellerbee and Dobyns reunited to anchor another late-night NBC news program, NBC News Overnight.

The program was known for an offbeat format, a somewhat less serious tone than such programs as 60 Minutes; comic relief included the use of humorous images (e.g., a trio of magazine covers, New York, The New Yorker, and the completely fictitious New Yorkest), and the occasional animated cartoon, such as Mr. Hipp. At the end of each broadcast, until the program began airing weekly, a sequence would be played of a rotating phonograph record with voiceover explaining when the next broadcast would take place.

In the spring of 1978, when Weekend's late-night run ended, Dobyns noted that "Your Subscription Has Expired", but stated that Weekend would be back that fall, in prime-time.

At the end of the last broadcast in 1979, the voice intoned, "...there will be no more Weekends."
