= NBC News Overnight =

American television program

- Genre: Overnight news program
- Presented by: Lloyd Dobyns; Linda Ellerbee; Bill Schechner
- Country of origin: United States
- Original language: English
- No. of episodes: 367

Production
- Camera setup: Single-camera
- Running time: 60 minutes (aired in tape-delayed loop)
- Production company: NBC News

Original release
- Network: NBC
- Release: July 5, 1982 – December 3, 1983

NBC News Overnight was a television news program on the NBC television network that aired weekday mornings from 1:30 a.m. to 2:30 a.m. (12:30 a.m. to 1:30 a.m. Central) Mondays through Thursdays and 2:00 a.m. to 3:00 a.m. (1:00 a.m. to 2:00 a.m. Central) Fridays from July 5, 1982, to December 3, 1983, for 367 telecasts. The program was noteworthy because during this era, a large majority of TV stations signed off between 1 and 3 a.m., with those few stations that operated 24 hours a day at the time either running syndicated shows and/or old movies.

== Key personalities ==
NBC News Overnight was the brainchild of NBC News president Reuven Frank, who conceived the show as inexpensive overnight programming after Late Night with David Letterman (Mondays-Thursdays) or SCTV Network (Fridays; later Friday Night Videos). The time slot was one that had originally been offered to and partially occupied by Tom Snyder's Tomorrow, before Snyder quit and ended that program in 1981 (and being replaced by Letterman in Snyder's former timeslot in February 1982). Frank had created the news program Weekend in 1974, and the two programs shared a similar, sometimes ironic outlook on the news. Weekend's co-hosts Lloyd Dobyns and Linda Ellerbee were reunited for the program initially, though Bill Schechner replaced Dobyns in November 1982. Herb Dudnick was the program's first executive producer and was succeeded by Deborah B. Johnson.

=== Humorous sign offs ===
During the show's early months, the anchors were known for ending the program in a humorous fashion. For example, during one installment, Dobyns was given a very long, complex word to say and he stumbled over it; at the end of that broadcast, the anchor took a moment to praise his writing staff, only to light-heartedly threaten to "take it all back" if they ever included such a word in his scripts again. Dobyns and then Ellerbee closed each show by saying, "And So It Goes." (which had been Dobyns' closing on Weekend). It became a bit of a catchphrase and was the title of Ellerbee's first autobiographical book.

== Critical response ==
NBC News Overnight was widely regarded as one of the smartest television news shows. Appealing to an eclectic audience of college students, nursing mothers, and late shift workers, the show broke the conventional "lowest common denominator" style of most news programs and injected humor into an otherwise seemingly boring medium, while providing news analysis of a kind usually unseen on other major-network newscasts. Time named it one of the best programs of 1982, calling it "TV's wittiest, toughest, least snazzy news strip", and, after the program left the air, one of the best programs of 1983. The duPont Columbia Awards awards jury cited NBC News Overnight as "possibly the best written and most intelligent news program ever."

=== Influences ===
NBC News Overnight was the inspiration for many news shows. From ABC's World News Now to Countdown with Keith Olbermann, many have attempted to imitate Overnight's signature style of combining hard news features with incisive commentary and light-hearted stories.

The Seven Network in Australia had a similar program with the same name (minus the "NBC") airing overnights on weeknights between 1985 and 1989. Clips from NBC News programs would often be shown within the broadcast.

== Cancellation ==
Despite a loyal audience, the show's rather weak ratings, high production cost (the show cost $3.5 million to produce) and corresponding lack of ad revenue led to the show's demise after only a year and a half on the air. After news of this got out, some viewers sent in money to help defray the costs of producing the program, all of which was returned to the donors. The 367th and final telecast of NBC News Overnight aired on December 3, 1983. The show's timeslot was replaced by either local programming (movies or syndicated shows) or dead air (if a station had signed off after Late Night With David Letterman or the then-new Friday Night Videos on Fridays). In 1984, NBC flagship WNBC-TV in New York began carrying a syndicated revival of its former daytime game show Jeopardy! in the slot, which lasted less than half a season before its syndicator moved it to a station that offered a far more favorable time slot. NBC eventually resumed programming the 1:30/12:30 time slot when it debuted Later in 1988, which has been succeeded in the 21st century by Last Call and A Little Late. NBC eventually surrendered the time slot back to its affiliates in 2021, following the end of A Little Late's run.

NBC's next late-night newscast, NBC Nightside, premiered in 1991; it would last until 1998. Thereafter, NBC stations ran either paid programming, Early Today or local morning newscasts in Nightside's timeslots. The network has not had a standard late-night newscast since then, although Early Today (which originally debuted in September 1999 as a replacement for the early morning newscast NBC News at Sunrise) began acting as a de facto overnight newscast in September 2017, when NBC moved its initial broadcast from 4:00 a.m. ET to 3:00 a.m. ET (extending the program's looping feed for affiliates by an additional hour).

== See also ==
- List of late-night American network TV programs
