= Helen Shores Lee =

American jurist

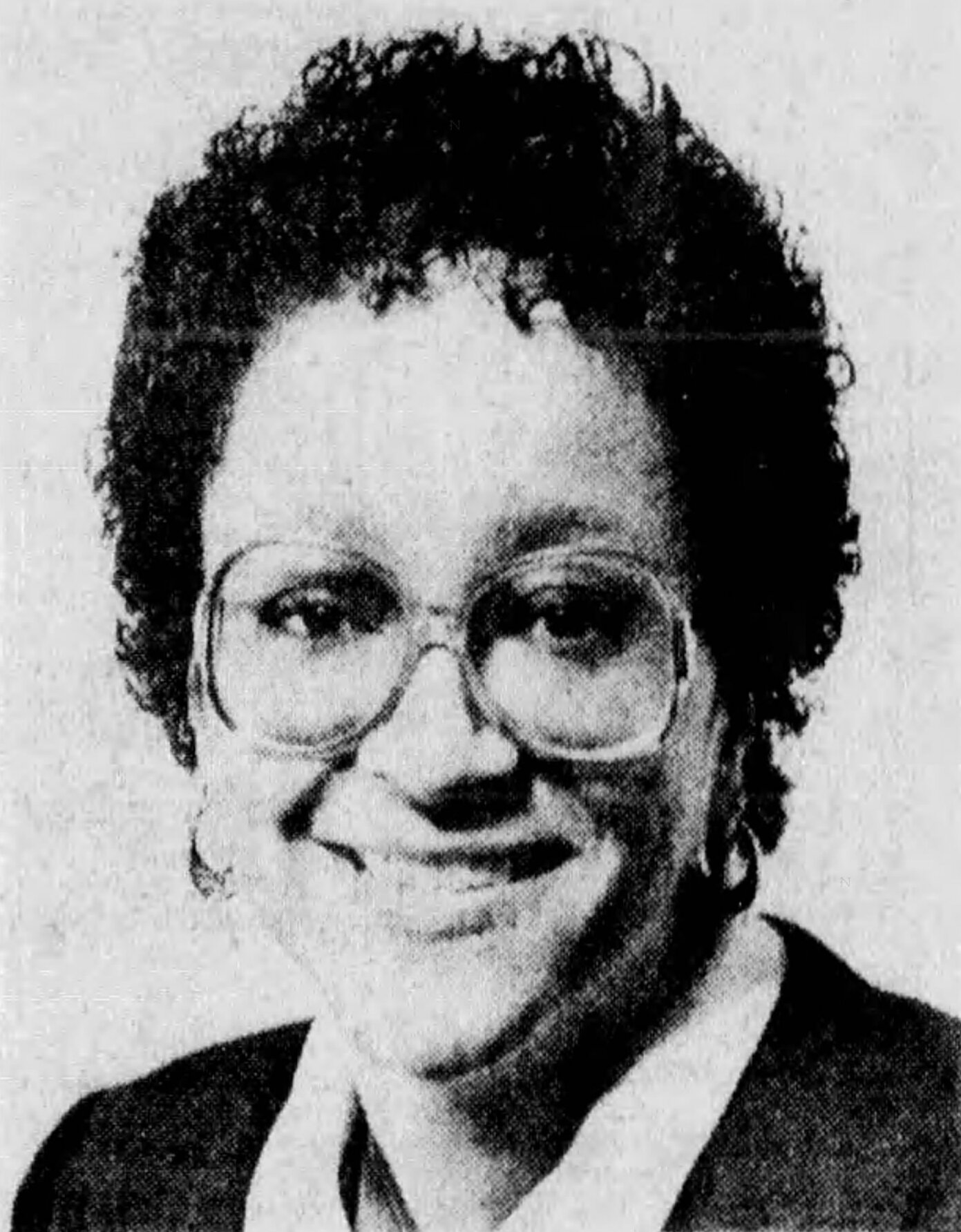
- Lee c. 1983
- Born: Helen Glynn Shores; May 3, 1941; Birmingham, Alabama, US
- Died: July 2, 2018 (aged 77); Birmingham, Alabama, US
- Education: Fisk University (BA); Pepperdine University (MA); Cumberland School of Law (JD)
- Occupations: Judge, lawyer, clinical psychologist
- Father: Arthur Shores

Helen Shores Lee (May 3, 1941 – July 2, 2018) was an American jurist and lawyer, serving as the first African-American female judge for the 10th Judicial Circuit of Alabama.

== Early life and education ==
Lee was born in Birmingham, Alabama, United States, on May 3, 1941. Her father was Arthur Davis Shores, a prominent civil rights attorney in Alabama and her mother, Theodora, was active in their community. Her neighborhood was a frequent target of the Ku Klux Klan and was attacked so many times it earned the nickname Dynamite Hill. Lee grew up in the segregated South, with separate facilities and entrances for black people. Given her parents' work, Lee herself often tried to resist the racism of the time throughout her adolescence. Lee tried to shoot at a car of white men threatening the family home when she was 13, but her father stopped her.

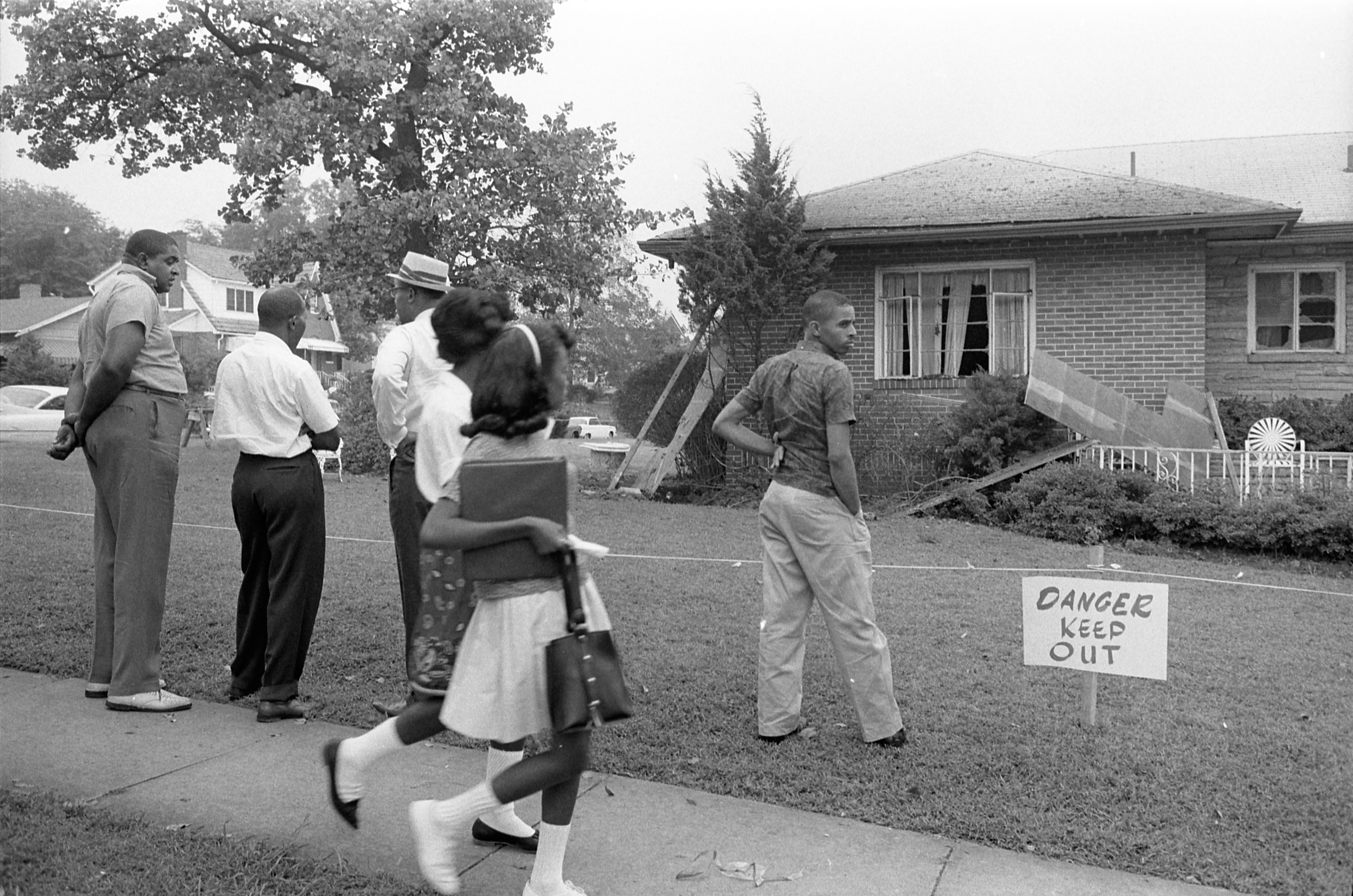
Shores' house following a bombing, 1963

Lee first attended a trial during Lucy v. Adams in 1955, where her father represented Autherine Lucy amidst the effort to desegregate the University of Alabama. She later described the disrespect toward her father in the case as dispiriting, driving her away from a legal career.

Lee graduated from A.H. Parker High School and went on to earn her Bachelor of Arts in psychology from Fisk University in 1962. In 1963, Lee's house was bombed twice within two weeks and also shot at; one attack injured Lee's mother and killed their family pet. She relocated to California and later earned her Master of Arts in clinical psychology from Pepperdine University.

== Career and later life ==
From 1971 to 1987, Lee worked as a clinical psychologist, before being encouraged by family friend Chris McNair to "follow in her father's footsteps". She enrolled in the Cumberland School of Law, graduating with her Juris Doctor in 1987 and admission to the Alabama State Bar in 1988. As a lawyer, she fought against both racial discrimination and segregation and working on cases dealing with employment discrimination and civil rights. She served on the Alabama State Ethics Commission from 1996 to 2000, and served as chairwomen from 1999 to 2000.

In 2003, Lee became a judge for the 10th Judicial Circuit of Alabama. She was the first African-American woman to serve as a judge in Jefferson County. In 2012, Lee published The Gentle Giant of Dynamite Hill: the Untold Story of Arthur Shores and His Family's Fight for Civil Rights, co-authored by Lee and her sister Barbara.

Lee retired in 2016. She died on July 2, 2018.

== Awards and honors ==
- In 2013, Lee was awarded the Jeana P. Hosch Woman of Valor from the YWCA
- In 2014, Lee was named Samford University Alumnus of the year
- In 2025, named to the Alabama Women's Hall of Fame
