= James Hood =

African-American student at the University of Alabama (1942–2013)

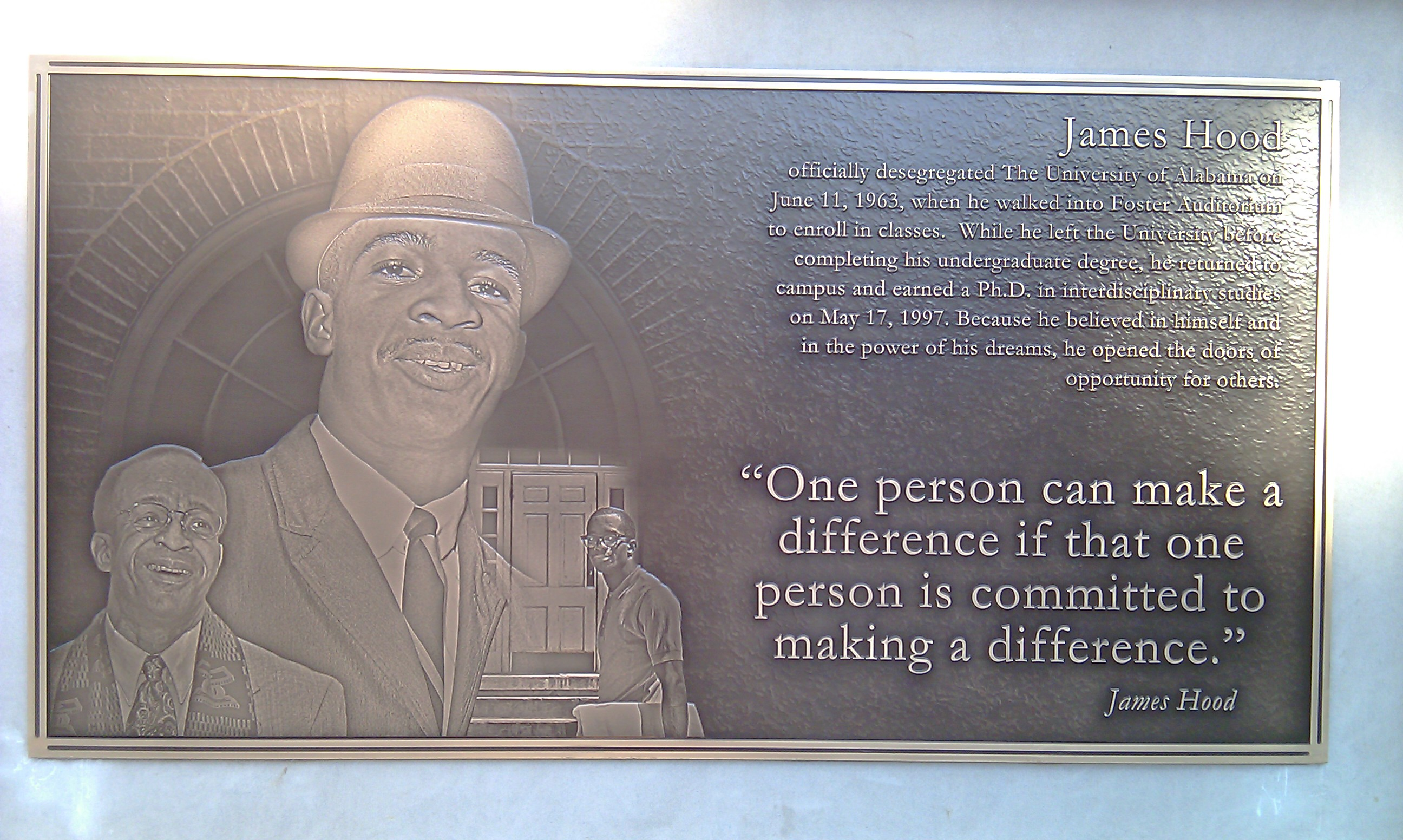
- Plaque commemorating Hood at the University of Alabama in Tuscaloosa, Alabama
- Born: James Alexander Hood; November 10, 1942; Gadsden, Alabama, U.S.
- Died: January 17, 2013 (aged 70); Gadsden, Alabama, U.S.
- Education: Clark College; University of Alabama; Wayne State University; Michigan State University
- Occupations: Civil rights activist; chairman of public safety services
- Known for: Among first African Americans to register at the University of Alabama

James Alexander Hood (November 10, 1942 – January 17, 2013) was one of the first African Americans to enroll at the University of Alabama in 1963. Hood became famous when Alabama Governor George Wallace attempted to block him and fellow student Vivian Malone from enrolling at the then all-white university, an incident which became known as the "Stand in the Schoolhouse Door". Hood and Malone were the first black students able to enroll in the university after Autherine Lucy in 1956. Hood faced violent threats at the school and left after two months, but finished his education in Michigan and worked in the police science program for the Madison Area Technical College for much of his career. Hood returned to the University of Alabama in the 1990s to earn a PhD in interdisciplinary studies, and conducted bedside interviews with Wallace during his research.

== Early life ==
Hood was born on November 10, 1942, in Gadsden, Alabama. His father, Octavie Hood, drove a tractor at a Goodyear tire plant. Hood attended Carver High in East Gadsden, a segregated black high school.

Hood remembered his civil rights activism starting when he was 17: he and other black teenagers walked from their town's single all-black swimming pool to desegregate one of the three all-white pools in the area. Every black teenager and child was arrested at the pool, except for Hood, who managed the all-black pool. Hood stated that the police did not want the all-black pool to shut down while he was arrested. The swimming pools in Gadsden desegregated one year later.

Hood began college at the historically black Clark College, but wanted to transfer so he could pursue a degree in clinical psychology, which wasn't available at Clark.

== University of Alabama ==
By the time Hood attended college, the University of Alabama was a segregated all-white school where at least 230 black students had applied only to have their applications rejected. The university did not state that these denials were due to race, instead using various excuses: enrollment was too high, applications had already closed, or applicants did not meet certain requirements. However, the community understood that the university would not admit any black students because of resistance to school desegregation.

In 1952, Autherine Lucy and Pollie Myers had been the first black students accepted to the university, but their admissions were revoked when the school learned the students were not white. The NAACP supported Lucy and Myers in years of court cases against the university until the U.S. Supreme Court ordered the university to admit the pair. However, the university again denied Myers admission, and three days after Lucy arrived at school, mobs of white community members led a violent riot against her, allowing the university to permanently suspend her on the pretext of student safety.

=== Applying to the university ===
While Hood attended Clark College, he was angered by a racist article he read in the Atlanta Journal, from the Associated Press. The article shared a study which concluded that black people were less intelligent than white people. The research was conducted by a professor from the University of North Carolina, and sponsored by George Wallace's campaign for Governor of Alabama. The study concluded that black people had smaller brains than white people, and cited the test scores and graduation rates of Alabama high schools, including Hood's. Hood was angry enough to write the professor a letter with his critiques, but the professor responded that Hood could not respond to the work because Hood did not have the right academic credentials. Hood decided to engage in more civil rights activism as a consequence.

Martin Luther King Jr. and other activists encouraged Hood to apply to the University of Alabama. As with prior black applicants, the university rejected Hood because he was black. The NAACP worked with Hood and Vivian Malone Jones, another black applicant, to sue the university for the pair's admission. By 1963, after two years of deliberation and court proceedings, District Court Judge Harlan Hobart Grooms ordered the university to admit Hood and Malone. The district court cited the U.S. Supreme Court's ruling in the Brown v. Board of Education case, in which the act of educating black children in schools intentionally separated from white students was charged as unconstitutional. Judge Grooms also forbade Governor Wallace from interfering with Malone and Hood's registration.

Hood learned about his acceptance when it was published in the newspaper and strangers accosted him at a Greyhound bus station. FBI agents arrived at the station and asked him to join them so they could protect his safety, but Hood was afraid that they could be impersonators. The agents called President John F. Kennedy to speak to Hood and verify their identities, and Hood began living under the protection of federal marshals.

=== Entering campus ===
Hood and Malone were to register for classes on June 11, 1963. When James Meredith had integrated the University of Mississippi the year before, violent mobs of white community members started the Ole Miss Riot. Administrators from the University of Alabama and Tuscaloosa city officials attempted to mitigate similar violence. One week before the pair's registration, the Ku Klux Klan staged a cross burning near campus.

For registration, Hood, Malone, and Deputy Attorney General Nicholas Katzenbach arrived at the university's Foster Auditorium along with federal marshals. Governor Wallace stood in front of the doors to physically block them from integrating campus in a ceremonial confrontation arranged the night before with President Kennedy. As Malone and Hood waited in a car, Deputy Attorney General Katzenbach and a small team of federal marshals confronted Wallace to demand that he step aside and allow Malone and Hood entry, by order of the state court. Wallace not only refused the order, he interrupted Katzenbach and, in front of the crowds of media crews surrounding him, delivered a short, symbolic speech concerning state sovereignty, claiming that: "The unwelcomed, unwanted, unwarranted and force-induced intrusion upon the campus of the University of Alabama... of the might of the Central Government offers frightful example of the oppression of the rights, privileges and sovereignty of this State by officers of the Federal Government."

After seeing that Wallace would not step aside, Katzenbach called upon the assistance of President Kennedy to force Wallace to permit the black students' entry into the university. President Kennedy federalized the Alabama National Guard later the same day, which put them under the command of the President, rather than the Governor of Alabama. Guardsmen escorted Hood and Malone back to the auditorium, where Wallace moved aside at the request of General Henry Graham. Hood and Malone then entered the building, albeit through another door.

=== Attending the university ===
Hood faced threats of violence and ostracism at the University of Alabama. He had an escort of federal marshals and had to carefully plan regular activities. In Hood's dormitory, every other room on his floor was occupied by federal marshals rather than students. The university spent an extra $100,000 on security for Malone and Hood, but Wallace pledged not to allow any state-level protection, so the federal government provided funds and resources. In the summer of 1963, rumors that the Ku Klux Klan wanted to burn more crosses on campus resulted in a stern speech from the university's president, Frank Rose, to campus security officers about protecting students.

Hood received threatening phone calls at night and saw hostile posters around campus. He once received a dead black cat in his mail. On the other hand, Hood received backlash from many black people for a piece he wrote for the student newspaper arguing that civil rights protests had been unnecessarily messy and unproductive: this article was republished in the national news and applauded by many white commentators. Hood stated that many white students did attempt to welcome him to the school, including the president of the student government and editor of the student newspaper. However, one white student who ate lunch with Hood was then disowned by his parents.

Malone and Hood were in the national news for their work to desegregate the university, with Life, Time, and The New York Times all running detailed coverage of the process. Gertrude Samuels, from the New York Times, ran a feature on their desegregation attempt and interviewed both students. Malone diminished their issues in her interview, and Samuels noted that Hood agreed but "alternated between easy grins and some worried frowns."

=== Leaving the university ===
In July 1963, Hood returned to East Gadsden to respond to the backlash over his editorial, and spoke during a rally at the First Baptist Church. He was critical of the University of Alabama and Governor Wallace, and unaware that two reporters were recording him until he was far into his speech. Several weeks later, Wallace's office worked with university officials to expel Hood, using the taped speech and earlier editorial as grounds for dismissal. Between the disciplinary proceedings, Hood delivered a signed apology to the Dean of Men at the school. However, the school remained very likely to expel him, via the same reasoning they had used to expel Autherine Lucy earlier.

Hood left the university in August, with civil rights attorney Arthur Shores sending the university a letter on August 11, 1963, stating that Hood would withdraw for his health. His doctor had told him that the heavy stress he was under was physically harming him. He felt crushing guilt over the impact his enrollment and fame had on his family. Additionally, his father had cancer, and Hood felt guilty about not helping to support his parents. Hood stated that he left the school to avoid a "complete mental and physical breakdown." The university was happy to have Hood withdraw this way because it did not face a public and embarrassing fight to expel Hood.

== Later life ==
Hood later received a bachelor's degree from Michigan's Wayne State University and a master's degree from Michigan State University, concentrating in criminal justice and sociology.

Hood then moved to Wisconsin, where he worked at the Madison Area Technical College for 26 years. He was a deputy police chief in Detroit at one point, and worked in the police science program at the Madison Area Technical College.

=== Return to the University of Alabama ===
Hood returned to the University of Alabama in the 1990s to begin earning his doctorate degree in interdisciplinary studies. In 1996, he started a book on George Wallace, the governor who had tried to prevent his integration of the University of Alabama back in 1963. Hood sat at Wallace's bedside for hours of interviews and the two became friends, although Hood grappled with how Wallace could explain his actions. Hood decided that Wallace was a politician willing to exploit racism for votes rather than a deeply racist person, although other black people who knew Wallace strongly contested Hood's justifications. Hood earned his Ph.D. in interdisciplinary studies in 1997 and requested that Wallace present his degree, and Wallace would have if not for his poor health.

Later in life, Wallace had apologized to both Hood and Malone for his past actions, and publicly insisted that he was a segregationist but not a racist. Hood accepted Wallace's apology for his past actions. In 1996, Hood and Malone met with Wallace for the first time since 1963, at a small gathering before Wallace would present Malone with a courage award. Malone stated that she had also forgiven Wallace in his later years.

Hood attended Wallace's funeral in 1998, saying that Wallace was haunted by people's lack of forgiveness for him. Hood said that Wallace's later work to change people's opinions outweighed his earlier actions, and that the two were alike in their understanding of pain and suffering.

== Personal life ==
Hood retired in 2002 as chairman of public safety services in charge of police and fire training at the Madison Area Technical College. He then moved back to Gadsden, Alabama, the city in which he was born, where he died at home on January 17, 2013, at the age of 70. He was survived by his daughters Mary Hood and Jacquelyn Hood-Duncan, and sons Darrell, Anthony, and Marvis Hood.

== See also ==
- List of African-American pioneers in desegregation of higher education
- James Meredith
- Little Rock Nine
- The McDonogh Three
