= Frank Rose (academic) =

American academic

Frank Anthony Rose

President of the University of Alabama
- In office 1958–1969
- Preceded by: James H. Newman
- Succeeded by: F. David Mathews

Personal details
- Born: October 16, 1920 Meridian, Mississippi
- Died: February 1, 1991 (aged 70) Washington, D.C.
- Spouse: Tommye
- Children: 4
- Education: graduate study, University of London; B.D., Lexington Theological Seminary; A.B. Transylvania College
- Profession: professor, university president

Frank Anthony Rose (October 16, 1920 – February 1, 1991) was an American academic, formerly a president of the University of Alabama.

Rose was a Meridian, Mississippi native. He earned a A.B. degree at Transylvania College, now Transylvania University, and a B.D. from Lexington Theological Seminary. Rose then attended the University of London for graduate school. In 1945, Transylvania College hired him as professor of philosophy, and in 1951, Rose became president of that institution. He was the youngest college president in the country. The United States Junior Chamber of Commerce elected Rose in 1955 as one of the "Ten Outstanding Young Men in America." Rose was also inducted into Omicron Delta Kappa at the University of Kentucky in 1955.

In 1958, Frank Rose became president of the University of Alabama. He was a 1959 delegate to the Atlantic Congress of NATO for the United States Committee. Rose was elected to the South's Hall of Fame for the Living in 1960, and earned the 1966 Distinguished Service Key from Omicron Delta Kappa, for which he was national president. Rose served as Chairman of the Board of Visitors in 1968 for the United States Military Academy at West Point. He further served as Chairman of the Educational Advisory Committee of the Appalachian Regional Commission in 1968. On August 25, 1969, the Alabama state legislature inducted Frank Rose into the Alabama Academy of Honor.

Dr. Rose's memberships included the former presidency of the Southern University Conference, chairman of the American University Field Staff Program, executive committee member of the Southern Regional Education Board, and regional chairmanship of the March of Dimes. Rose served on the National Citizen's Committee on Public Television, and advised the US Army as a member of the Advisory Panel for ROTC Affairs.

Rose was honored with Omicron Delta Kappa's Laurel Crowned Circle Award in 1990, the society's highest honor. He was also awarded several honorary degrees from the University of Cincinnati, the University of Alabama, Samford University, Transylvania College, Lynchburg College, Saint Bernard College (renamed Southern Benedictine College), and the University of the Americas in Mexico City. Rose died in 1991 from cancer and pneumonia, aged 70.

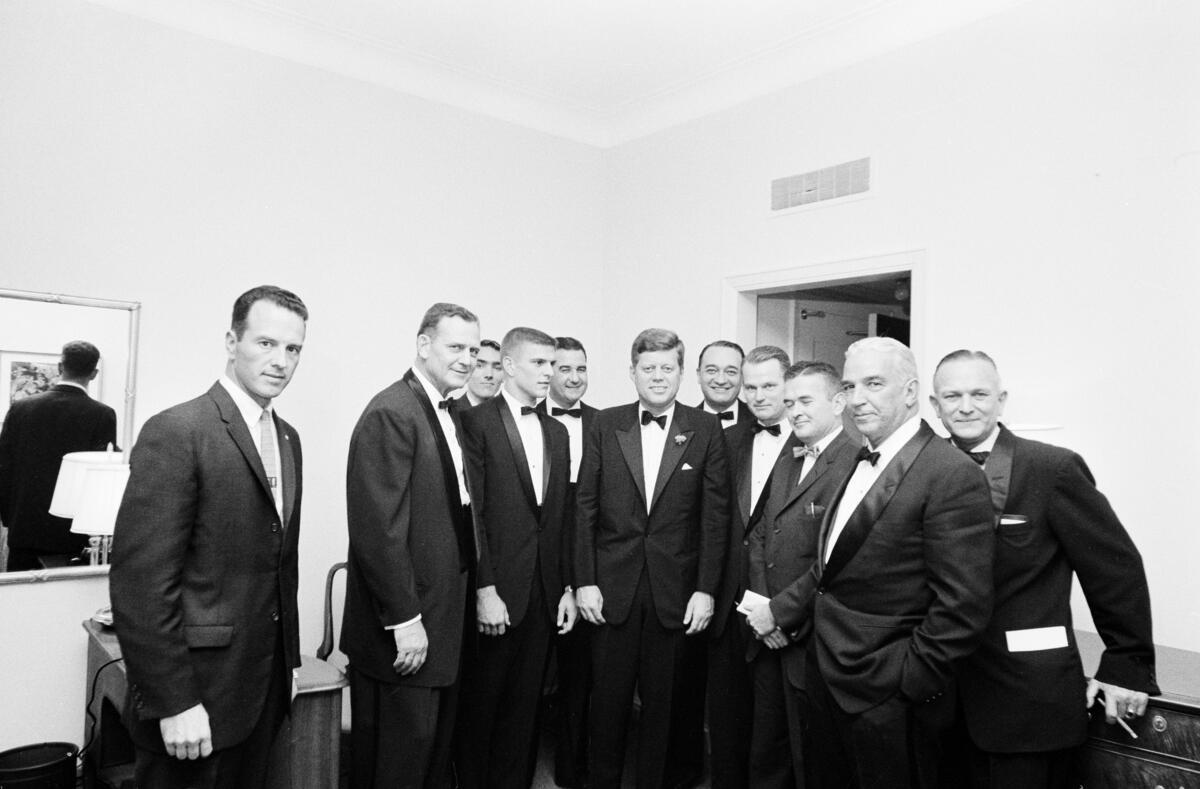
President John F. Kennedy stands with attendees of the Football Hall of Fame Dinner. L-R: White House Army Signal Agency (WHASA) staff member, Jack Rubley; University of Alabama football coach, Bear Bryant; WHASA staff member, John J. Cochran (in back); University of Alabama quarterback, Pat Trammell; University of Alabama President, Dr. Frank Rose; President Kennedy; sportscaster, Mel Allen; Young Boozer, Jr.; Birmingham News sports writer, Benny Marshall; Alabama businessman, Tom Russell; and Jeff Coleman.

Rose was also the president who hired Paul W. "Bear" Bryant, one of the most successful and famous college football coaches in American history.

== "Stand in the Schoolhouse Door" ==
Rose was president of the University of Alabama during a perilous sequence of events surrounding desegregation that included the June 11, 1963, highly orchestrated "Stand in the Schoolhouse Door" by Gov. George Wallace, who had promised to do just that to prevent desegregation of the state's schools.

By passing on to Gov. George Wallace the admissions applications of potential Black students, Rose facilitated use of the Alabama Highway Patrol's investigative powers to disqualify or blackmail applicants into withdrawing. This technique had become standard practice at the University of Alabama after its use in the mid-1950s to discredit Autherine Lucy. But investigators could find nothing of substance to use against Vivian Malone or James Hood.

During the crisis, Rose played both sides of the fence, according to historian Dan T. Carter:

In conversations with Wallace, Rose assumed the role of the dutiful defender of segregation, harassed by the implacable federal government and anxious to protect his beloved university from destruction. In encounters with (U.S. Attorney General Robert F. Kennedy) and other Justice Department officials, however, he became the reluctant foot soldier of the governor, an enthusiastic fifth columnist for the Kennedy administration, constrained by the stifling conditions of Alabama politics. By the twenty-fifty anniversary of the stand in the school house door, Rose had managed to convince himself (and to assert publicly) that he had single-handedly persuaded the Kennedys, despite their misgivings, to press on with the integration of the University of Alabama.

There was a lot of national press coverage of the university during this period, and Rose was very worried about any negative press. In July 1963, Gertrude Samuels visited the university to do a feature on the school's desegregation process and interview the people involved. Rose criticized Samuels before the story was released, telling an associate that he "had a great deal of trouble with the woman." He had his vice president, who knew The Times Magazine's editor, call the editor to get Samuels removed from the piece. When her feature was released, it was congratulatory of the university and highlighted strategic quotes from Jones and Hood. Rose called Samuels to thank her "for your excellent story and for the fair way in which you treated the University and our two students."
