= Vivian Malone Jones =

American civil rights advocate (1942–2005)

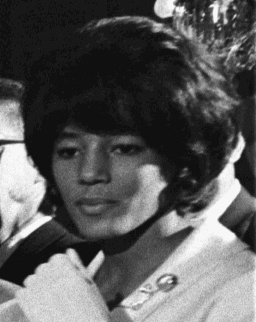
- Jones in 1965
- Born: Vivian Juanita Malone; July 15, 1942; Mobile, Alabama, U.S.
- Died: October 13, 2005 (aged 63); Atlanta, Georgia, U.S.
- Education: Alabama A&M University (Undergraduate); University of Alabama (Undergraduate); George Washington University (Postgraduate)
- Known for: Integrating the University of Alabama
- Movement: Desegregation movement
- Spouse: Mack Arthur Jones
- Children: 2
- Relatives: Eric Holder (brother-in-law); Jeff Malone (nephew)

Vivian Juanita Malone Jones (July 15, 1942 – October 13, 2005) was the first Black American student to graduate from the University of Alabama, in 1965. She and James Hood were the first Black students able to enroll at the university since Autherine Lucy and Pollie Myers initially strove to desegregate the school. Malone became famous when George Wallace, the Governor of Alabama, attempted to physically block her and Hood from enrolling at the all-white university. Malone faced threats and ostracism at the university but successfully graduated in two years with a Bachelor of Arts in Business Management. Throughout her career, Malone continued to work for civil rights causes. She worked for various federal agencies like the Department of Justice and Environmental Protection Agency, and served as executive director of the Voter Education Project.

== Early life ==
Malone was born in Mobile, Mobile County, Alabama in 1942, the fourth of eight children. Her parents both worked at Brookley Air Force Base; her father served in maintenance and her mother worked as a domestic servant. Her parents emphasized the importance of receiving an education and made sure that their children attended college. Each of Malone's older brothers attended Tuskegee University. Her parents were also active in civil rights and often participated in local meetings, donations, and activities in the community that promoted equality and desegregation. As a teenager, Malone was often involved in community organizations to end racial discrimination and worked closely with local leaders of the movements to work for desegregation in schools.

Malone attended Central High School, where she was a member of the National Honor Society. In February 1961, she enrolled in Alabama Agricultural and Mechanical University, one of the few colleges for black students in the state. She attended Alabama A&M for two years and received a bachelor's degree in business education. Malone wanted to pursue a degree in accounting, a field of study not offered by Alabama A&M at the time. Moreover, the bachelor's degree Malone received was issued to her before the university had been fully accredited by the Southern Association of Colleges and Schools. To earn an accredited degree in accounting, Malone would have to transfer to another university.

== University of Alabama ==
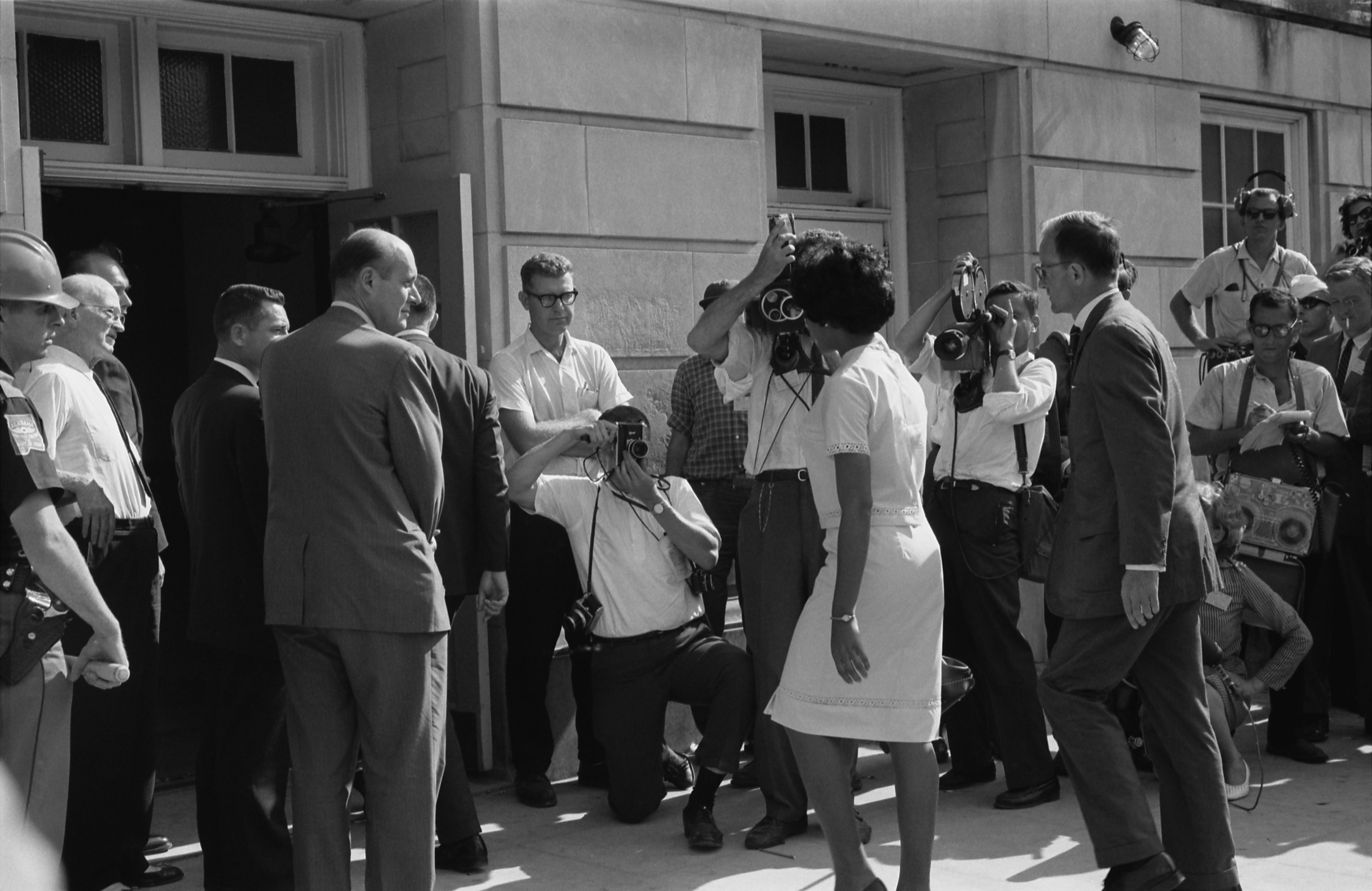
Malone registering for classes at University of Alabama, 1963

=== Applying to the University of Alabama ===
In 1961, Malone received word from a family friend that the local Non-Partisan Voter League had organized a plan to desegregate the University of Alabama's branch school in Mobile. Due to her exceptional performance in high school, the organization suggested Malone apply to the Mobile campus. At least 200 Black students had applied to the university only to have their applications rejected. The university denied admission to the applicants on the grounds of over-enrollment and closed enrollment, the quotas already being filled or the academic performance of the students not meeting required standards; however, it became understood by the community that the university would not admit the black students because of resistance to school desegregation.

Black students who applied to the university's branch campus in Mobile were investigated by the university's department of Public Safety, including Malone. After applying to the Mobile branch of the University of Alabama, Malone and her family were visited by two white men who claimed that they were representatives of the state. They disclosed that her attempts to apply to the Mobile campus and integrate with the school instigated a violent retaliation from the local white community from which the family would not receive much protection. The threat to her safety did not deter Malone from continuing to support integration in the university and she persisted in applying to the University of Alabama to earn a degree in accounting. In later interviews, Malone recounted that seeing Autherine Lucy's initial attempt to desegregate the University of Alabama inspired her to persevere in desegregation work: “I was a child when that happened, but her efforts had an indelible impression on me...I figured if she could do it, I could do it.”

=== Court cases ===
The NAACP Legal Defense and Educational Fund of Alabama organized an opportunity with Malone to enroll her in the University of Alabama's School of Commerce and Business Administration to earn her accounting degree. The Legal Defense Fund had been working closely with a student, James Hood, to desegregate the University of Alabama. After two years of deliberation and court proceedings, Malone and Hood were granted permission to enroll in the university by order of District Court Judge Harlan Hobart Grooms in 1963. The district court had ruled that the University of Alabama's practice of denying black students admission into their university was a violation of the U.S. Supreme Court's ruling in the Brown v. Board of Education case, in which the act of educating black children in schools intentionally separated from white students was charged as unconstitutional. Judge Grooms had also forbidden Governor George Wallace from interfering with the students' registration.

=== Entering campus ===
On June 11, 1963, Malone and Hood, accompanied by United States Deputy Attorney General Nicholas Katzenbach and a three-car motorcade full of federal marshals, arrived at the University of Alabama's campus with the intention to enroll. Waiting for them on campus and blocking the entryway to Foster Auditorium was Governor Wallace, flanked by a group of state troopers. Wallace intended to keep true to his promise of upholding segregation in the state and stopping "integration at the schoolhouse door". As Malone and Hood waited in a car, Deputy Attorney General Katzenbach and a small team of federal marshals confronted Wallace to demand that Malone and Hood be allowed entry by order of the federal court and for Wallace to step aside.

Wallace had not only refused the order, but he interrupted Katzenbach; in front of the crowds of media crews surrounding him, Wallace delivered a short, symbolic speech concerning state sovereignty, claiming:

The unwelcomed, unwanted, unwarranted and force-induced intrusion upon the campus of the University of Alabama ... of the might of the Central Government offers frightful example of the oppression of the rights, privileges and sovereignty of this State by officers of the Federal Government.

After seeing that Wallace would not step aside, Katzenbach called upon the assistance of President John F. Kennedy to force Wallace to permit the black students' entry into the university. Katzenbach took Malone up to her dormitory and told her to see her room and eat lunch alone in the dining room if she became hungry. Malone went downstairs into the dining room, and was surprised to be joined by several white students, who ate lunch with her. She remained in the dormitory until the situation was determined to have calmed down.

President John F. Kennedy federalized the Alabama National Guard later the same day, which put them under the command of the president, rather than the governor of Alabama. One hundred guardsmen escorted Malone and Hood from their dorms back to the auditorium, where Wallace moved aside at the request of General Henry V. Graham. Malone and Hood then entered the building, albeit through another door. As she and Hood entered the building, they were met with surprising applause from white supporters of integration. They then entered the gym and registered as students of the university, with Malone being accepted into the university as a junior. Malone recalled that this entrance to campus was frightening: she could not stop thinking about the potential for a repeat of the race riot that happened months earlier at the University of Mississippi.

=== Threats ===
Two trends added worries to Malone's time at the University of Alabama: the threat of violence and the strong desire by local white politicians and community members to find excuses to expel Malone. The university spent an extra $100,000 on security for Malone and Hood, and with Wallace pledging not to allow any state-level protection, the federal government provided marshals and National Guardsmen, and the school asked for federal grants to cover their security costs. In the summer of 1963, rumors that the Ku Klux Klan wanted to burn a cross on campus resulted in a stern speech from the university's president, Frank Rose, to campus security officers. Then on September 15, there was a nearby white supremacist terrorist attack in the 16th Street Baptist Church Bombing. Considering this and the earlier Ole Miss Riot, university officials made students sign pledges to not "contribute to disorder" that fall.

With no major threats for a couple months, the guardsmen began to relax, and were soon to be demobilized. However, on November 16, a bomb went off 130 yards away from Malone's room, tearing a foot-long hole in the concrete of the street and waking Malone up in the middle of the night. She visited Stillman College the next day, when another bomb went off at the University of Alabama. Over the next four days, two more bombs followed. At the same time, calls came in threatening more violence: after the first bombing, one said that "last night the explosion was outside–the next night it will be inside." Wallace's legal advisor, Cecil Jackson, called a university official, Jeff Bennett, to argue for removing Malone from the dorms "for the safety of the other children." Bennett thought that Wallace was behind the bombings, or at least using them to remove Malone, and went to visit him in Montgomery to ask him to make them stop. Wallace responded by asking him what the university could do if four or five cars full of Alabama Highway Patrolmen tried to remove Malone by force. A member of the university's board also called Wallace after hearing the university president's complaints about the governor. The next day, President Kennedy was assassinated, and Malone considered this the most blatant reminder of how she could be killed at any time due to her position. However, she remained at the university. After this period of violence, there were no more bombings near Malone at the university.

=== Attending the University of Alabama ===
During Malone's first year, she and Hood were the subject of national news for their work desegregating the university, and Life, Time, and The New York Times all ran detailed coverage of the process. Malone's interview with Gertrude Samuels from The New York Times in July emphasized Malone's determination to persevere at the school without falling into political traps. She told Samuels that she and Hood were doing fine and trying not to increase tensions: "We're just two more students here. That's what we hoped we'd be, and that's the way it is. There are no problems at all." When pressed, Malone also stated she had no social life. She faced endless rumors about her conduct and her impact on the university, repeated in Tuscaloosa or across Alabama. Many of them were attempts by the community to build outrage and get her expelled from the school. At one point, a university dean wrote a memo listing out many of the rumors against her and refuted Malone's supposed transgressions, clarifying that many of the harms she had supposedly caused for other students had not actually happened.

During Malone's time at the University of Alabama, she faced ostracism and hostility from other students due to her race, and the effects were worsened by the fact that Hood dropped out early during the first year due to the racism he had faced. Malone was frequently assigned to seats in class that placed a conspicuous ring of empty seats around her, and she skipped school dances rather than attending to be ignored. She faced bullying, such as when someone dumped a cup of ice on her at a football game. However, Malone felt encouraged by shows of support by some other students, and she was able to make friends early on with some white women on campus. She went on dates during this time too, with black men from the nearby Stillman College.

Two years later, in 1965, she received a Bachelor of Arts in business management and became the first black student to graduate from the University of Alabama. She graduated with a B-plus average.

== Later life ==
Despite her university achievements, Malone did not receive any job offers in Alabama. She later joined the civil rights division of the U.S. Department of Justice and served as a research analyst. While in Washington, she attended George Washington University and pursued a master's degree in public administration. She took a job as an employee relations specialist at the central office of the United States Veteran's Administration. During her time in Washington, she attended the signing of the Voting Rights Act of 1965.

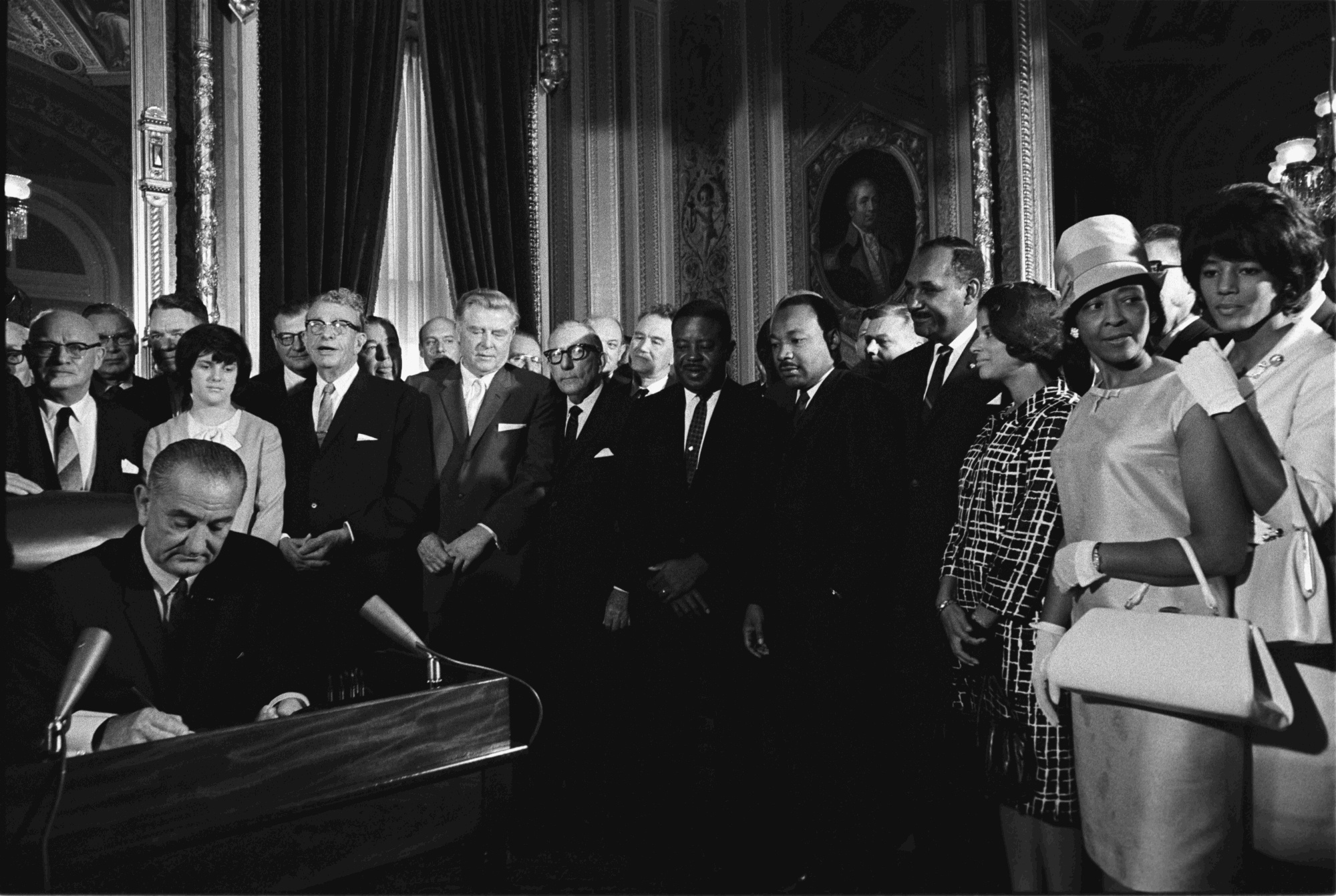
Vivian Malone Jones, far right, at the signing of the Voting Rights Act of 1965.

Malone was appointed to a position as the executive director of the Voter Education Project in August 1977 and worked towards voter equality for minorities. In this role, she helped provide assistance and funds to local voter registration projects. She also helped in the piloting of Project 23, a program aimed at addressing the barriers that kept Black individuals in the state of Georgia from registering to vote or running for public office. By 1978, the Voter Education project had assisted in the voter registration of about three million Black individuals. She later became the Director of Civil Rights and Urban Affairs and Director of Environmental Justice for the U.S. Environmental Protection Agency, a position she held until her retirement in 1996. Upon her retirement, she began to sell life insurance.

In October 1996, Malone was chosen by the George Wallace Family Foundation to be the first recipient of its Lurleen B. Wallace Award of Courage. George Wallace, the governor who had attempted to block her from integrating the University of Alabama, presented her with the award and praised her: "Vivian Malone Jones was at the center of the fight over states' rights and conducted herself with grace, strength and, above all, courage." They had met privately the night before, for the first time since their confrontation, where Malone said that Wallace apologized, and she had already forgiven him. Wallace had also previously taken back his defiance against progressing civil rights. Interviewed after receiving the award, Malone said that "There is no question Wallace and I will be remembered for the stand in the schoolhouse door.... But the best that can happen at this point is to say it was a mistake."

In 2000, Malone gave the commencement address at the University of Alabama, and the university bestowed on her a doctorate of humane letters. Additionally, in 2004, the Alabama State Legislature honored her by passing a resolution in commemoration of her outstanding achievements.

== Personal life ==
Malone was married to Mack Arthur Jones, an obstetrician, who predeceased her in 2004. She first met Jones when he was hired as her driver at the University of Alabama. She was a member of From the Heart Christian Ministries of Atlanta where she served as an usher. Her brother-in-law Eric Holder served as U.S. Attorney General. Her nephew Jeff Malone was an All-American basketball student-athlete at Mississippi State University and NBA standout.

Malone died following a stroke at age 63 on October 13, 2005, in an Atlanta hospital. Her funeral services were held at the Martin Luther King Jr. International Chapel at Morehouse College. Malone had a son, a daughter, three grandchildren, four sisters, and three brothers.

== Legacy ==
=== Popular culture ===
The arrival of Vivian Malone Jones and James Hood to the University of Alabama, also known as Stand in the Schoolhouse Door, was depicted in the 1994 film Forrest Gump. The main character appeared at the event and handed Malone a book she dropped when walking into Foster Auditorium.

=== Historical marker and additional honors ===
In 2017, a historical marker was installed at the Mobile County Health Department in honor of Malone. It was placed at the location of her childhood home, which is now the parking lot for the Keeler Memorial Building on the Health Department's campus. The marker sits along the Dora Franklin Finley African-American Heritage Trail in Mobile, Alabama.

In 2018, a street in downtown Mobile was named in her honor.

=== Awards and community impact ===
In 2018, JaVaughnae Malone and her mother, Janice, started a nonprofit called Vivian's Door in Mobile, Alabama. With a purpose of fostering minority-owned businesses, Vivian's Door has dedicated itself to providing training, resources, networking opportunities, and customers to local minority businesses in south Alabama. Their initiative was inspired by JaVaughnae's cousin, Vivian Malone Jones.

The University of Alabama awards a student the Vivian Malone Jones Endowed Scholarship for Diversity each year.

In 2014, the Environmental Protection Agency established the Vivian Malone Jones Legacy Award in her honor. Each year, an individual who has demonstrated integrity and consistently contributed to social justice in the Environmental Protection Agency or in the greater community is presented with this award in memoriam of Malone and the legacy of her work.

== See also ==
- List of African-American pioneers in desegregation of higher education
- Little Rock Nine
- The McDonogh Three
- James Meredith
