= Shiloh, Alabama =

Shiloh, Alabama may refer to several places in the U.S. state of Alabama:

- Shiloh, DeKalb County, Alabama, a town
- Shiloh, Marengo County, Alabama, an unincorporated community
- Shiloh, Pike County, Alabama, an unincorporated community in Pike County, Alabama
- Shiloh, Greene County, Alabama an unincorporated community in Greene County, Alabama, containing the Shiloh Baptist Church
- Shiloh, Macon County, Alabama a rural community in Macon County, Alabama, containing the Shiloh Missionary Baptist Church and Rosenwald School
