= Bombingham =

Nickname for Birmingham, Alabama during the Civil Rights Movement

- Part of the civil rights movement
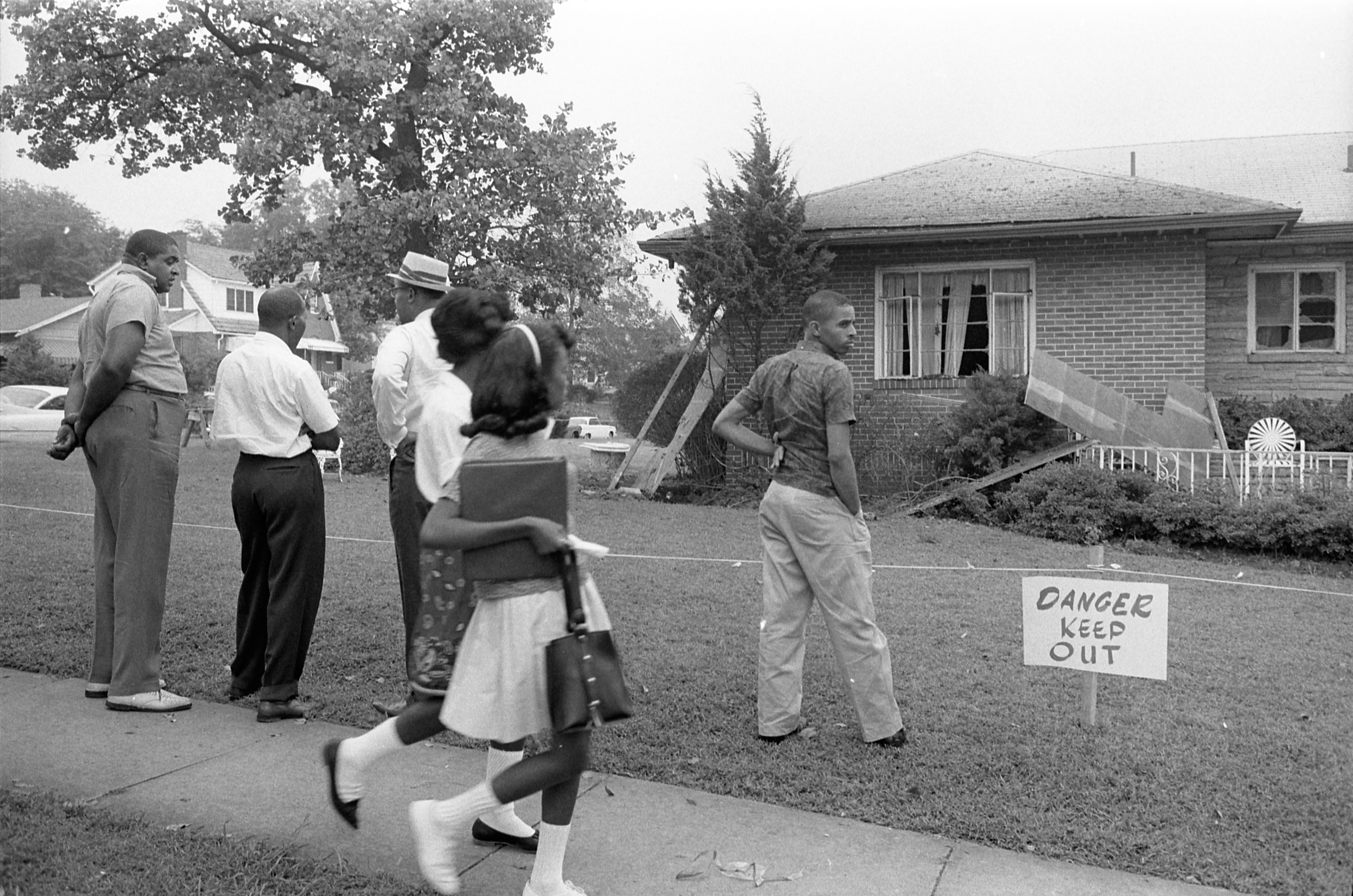
- Locals look at the bombed home of Arthur Shores in 1963.
- Location: Birmingham, Alabama
- Attack type: Bombings, arson, shootings
- Victims: Arthur Shores and other local African Americans
- Perpetrator: Ku Klux Klan
- Motive: Prevent African Americans from moving to white segregated neighborhoods.

Bombingham is a nickname for Birmingham, Alabama during the civil rights movement due to the 50 dynamite explosions that occurred in the city between 1947 and 1965. The bombings were initially used against African Americans attempting to move into neighborhoods with entirely white residents. Later, the bombings were used against anyone working towards racial desegregation in the city. One neighborhood within Birmingham experienced so many bombings it developed the nickname of Dynamite Hill.

== History ==
By the 1940s, black families were trying to purchase homes in segregated white areas of Birmingham. The local Ku Klux Klan began a terror campaign against black families attempting to move to the west side of Center Street, sometimes firing shots or bombs at houses or lighting a home's door on fire. Center Street became known as Dynamite Hill because of these attacks. From the late 1940s to the 1960s, over 40 unsolved bombings occurred in Birmingham. Klan members specifically targeted civil rights lawyer Arthur Shores who lived in Birmingham. Some families refused to leave, instead tolerating the attacks in an effort to support desegregation efforts.

== Bombings ==
1. July 28, 1949 — Home of the Reverend Milton Curry Jr, at 1100 Center Street North.
2. August 2, 1949 — Second bomb at the Curry's home.
3. April 22, 1950 — Third bomb at the Curry's home.
4. December 21, 1950 — Home of Monroe and Mary Means Monk at 950 North Center Street, who had challenged the city of Birmingham's zoning laws.
5. December 24, 1956 — The home of the Rev. Fred Shuttlesworth, Black minister of Bethel Baptist Church and activist is bombed.
6. December 31, 1956 — A black home is bombed.
7. July 1957- A black home is bombed.
8. December 1957- five black homes are bombed.
9. Unknown date 1957 — Bomb at 1216 13th Street North in Fountain Heights.
10. June 29, 1958 — The Ku Klux Klan bombs a black church.
11. July 17, 1958 — The Ku Klux Klan bombs a black home.
12. January 16, 1962 — The Ku Klux Klan bombs three black churches.
13. December 14, 1962 — A black church is bombed.
14. May 12, 1963 — Two black civil rights activists' homes are bombed.
15. August 15, 1963 — An integrated store is bombed.
16. August 20, 1963 – Home of civil rights lawyer Arthur Shores is bombed.
17. September 4, 1963 — Second bomb at the Shores' home.
18. September 8, 1963 – A black business is bombed.
19. September 15, 1963 — 16th Street Baptist Church bombing killed four young girls: Addie May Collins, Denise McNair, Carole Robertson, and Cynthia Wesley.
20. October 2, 1963 — A black business is bombed.
21. March 21, 1965 — Attempted Ku Klux Klan bombing of black neighborhood. Time bombs found before detonating.
22. April 1, 1965 — Ku Klux Klan suspected of bombing home of a black accountant and the attempted bombing of the homes of the mayor and city council.

== Bibliography ==
- Eskew, Glenn T. (1997). "Bombingham". But for Birmingham: The Local and National Movements in the Civil Rights Struggle. University of North Carolina Press. ISBN 9780807846674.
