= Benny Marshall =

American journalist

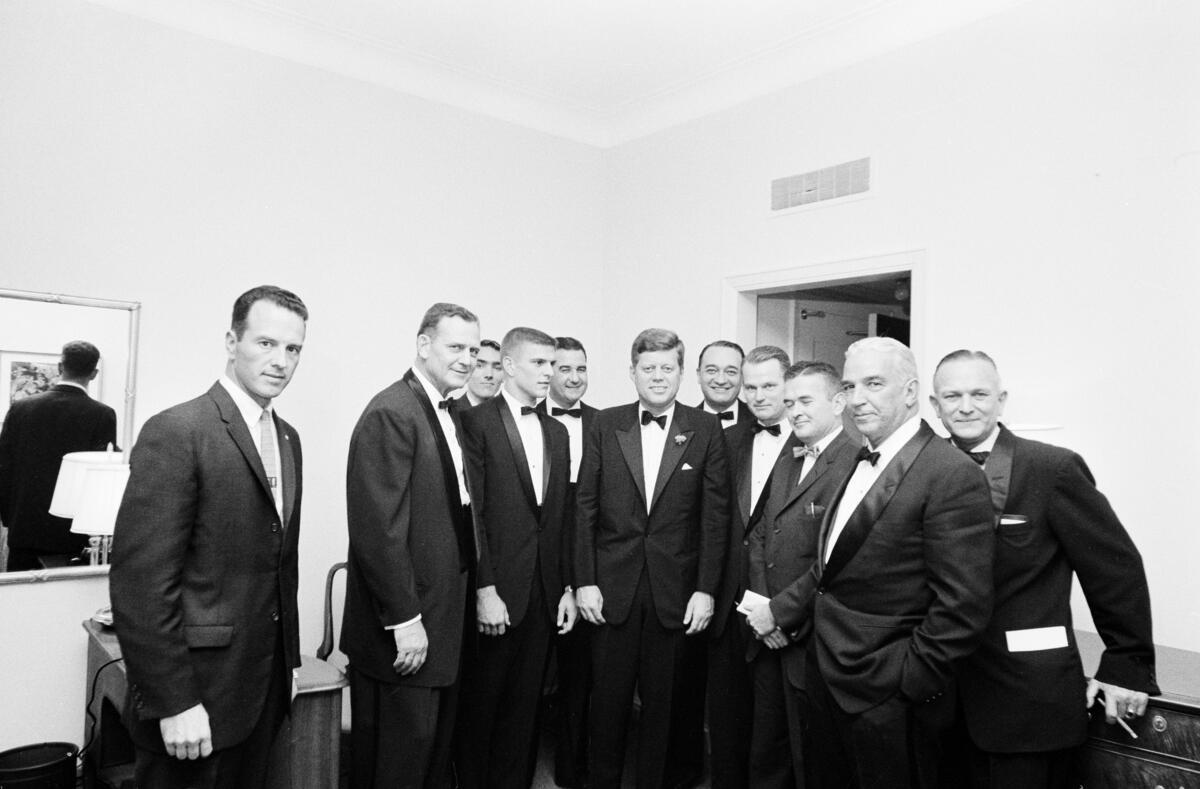
President John F. Kennedy stands with attendees of the Football Hall of Fame Dinner. L-R: White House Army Signal Agency (WHASA) staff member, Jack Rubley; University of Alabama football coach, Bear Bryant; WHASA staff member, John J. Cochran (in back); University of Alabama quarterback, Pat Trammell; University of Alabama President, Dr. Frank Rose; President Kennedy; sportscaster, Mel Allen; Young Boozer Jr.; Birmingham News sports writer, Benny Marshall; Alabama businessman, Tom Russell; and Jeff Coleman.

Bennett "Benny" Marshall (November 6, 1919 - September 25, 1969) was a ten-time winner of the Alabama Sportswriter of the Year from the National Sportscasters and Sportswriters Association. He is considered the top sports writer in Alabama newspaper history. He became sports editor of The Birmingham News in 1959, replacing Zip Newman, and won numerous state and national awards. His son, Phillip Marshall, was a sports writer for The Huntsville News, The Birmingham Post-Herald, The Huntsville Times and sports editor of The Montgomery Advertiser. Three other children - David, Ellen and Matt - are no longer living. Marshall died on September 25, 1969, from a self-inflicted gunshot. He was 49.
