= Gertrude Samuels =

American journalist

- Born: 1910; Manchester, England
- Died: 2003 (aged 92–93); New York City, U.S.
- Citizenship: United States; United Kingdom
- Occupations: Journalist; Author

Gertrude Samuels (1910–2003) was a photojournalist and later a member of the editorial board of The New York Times.

== Early life and education ==
Samuels was born in Manchester, England, and immigrated to the United States at age 14, when her family moved to Chicago. She attended Busch Conservatory of Music, then George Washington University, but dropped out in 1937 to work at the New York Post. Samuels stated that she always wanted to be a writer.

Much later in her career Samuels discovered New York University's Gallatin School for mature and self-directed students who wanted to craft personalized programs to fit their career interests. She decided to attend to refocus her career on radio and television theater programs. Samuels earned a bachelor's and master's degree from New York University, becoming valedictorian with her bachelor's in English literature in 1982.

== Career ==
Samuels was an early photojournalist, covering foreign and domestic affairs. In addition to the New York Post, she contributed to Newsweek and Time magazine before joining The New York Times in 1943. Her work at The Times started with the Week in Review, where she summarized the week's news, but later The Times Magazine sent her on trips to cover current events. She frequently covered the U.S., Europe, the Middle East, and Southeast Asia. Her work documented displaced-persons camps after World War II in Europe, the formation of Israel and refugee movements in the Middle East, and school desegregation in the South.

In early work for The Times Magazine, Samuels covered the development of genocide as a crime punishable under international law, documenting the United Nations' process of making a genocide treaty. Raphael Lemkin, one of the subjects of her piece, wrote her to thank her and provide more news about the campaign to ratify the treaty. In her later position on The New York Times Editorial Board she was a major supporter of international conventions against genocide.

In July 1963 Samuels visited the University of Alabama to do a feature on the school's desegregation process after the Stand in the Schoolhouse Door occurred there that June. She interviewed Vivian Malone Jones and James Hood, the two black students who had worked to integrate the school. Frank Rose, the university's president, was very worried about any negative press, and criticized Samuels, telling an associate that he "had a great deal of trouble with the woman," and he had his vice president, who knew The Times Magazine's editor, call the editor to get Samuels removed from the piece. When her feature was released, it was congratulatory of the university, and Rose called Samuels to thank her "for your excellent story and for the fair way in which you treated the University and our two students."

Samuels's photojournalism appeared in National Geographic, Redbook, the Saturday Evening Post, and the United States Information Service, but she wrote for the New York Times for decades. She was also a longtime United Nations correspondent for The New Leader magazine. She left the New York Times in 1975 so she could focus on writing magazine articles, plays, and books. Her books targeted a variety of audiences and genres.

== Honors ==
Samuels won the George Polk Award in 1955, and other photography awards throughout her career. In 2003, her work was featured alongside others' at the exhibition "On the Front Line: Women Journalists on War and Politics," held at Boston University's Mugar Library.

== Personal life ==
Samuels married a refugee from Nazi Germany and had a son, Paul Oppenheimer, who became a college professor. She returned to work three months after having Paul, stating later that she liked her career in journalism and they needed the money for rent and for a good education for her son. She had two grandchildren at the time of her death.

Samuels lived for a long time in New York City, and after graduating from New York University, moved to a Long Island houseboat she bought called the SeaRobin to write a book on beach life.

== Publications ==
=== Books ===
- B-G: Fighter of Goliaths; The Story of David Ben-Gurion (1961, revised edition 1974)
- The People vs. Baby: A Documentary Novel (1967)
- The Secret of Gonen: Portrait of a Kibbutz on the Border in a Time of War (1969)
- Run, Shelley, Run! (1974)
- Mottele: A Partisan Odyssey (1976)
- Adam's Daughter (1977)
- Of David and Eva: A Love Story (1978)
- Yours, Brett (1988)

=== Plays ===
- The Plant That Talked Back (1970)
- Judah the Maccabee and Me (1970)
