= Pat Trammell =

American football player (1940–1968)

- Trammell circa 1961

No. 13
- Position: Quarterback

Personal information
- Born: July 11, 1940; Scottsboro, Alabama, U.S.
- Died: December 10, 1968 (aged 28); Birmingham, Alabama, U.S.
- Listed height: 6 ft 1 in (1.85 m)
- Listed weight: 200 lb (91 kg)

Career information
- High school: Scottsboro (AL)
- College: University of Alabama

Awards and highlights
- National champion (1961); Second-team All-American (1961); SEC Player of the Year (1961); First-team All-SEC (1961)

Patrick Lee Trammell (July 11, 1940 – December 10, 1968) was an American college football player. He played quarterback at the University of Alabama from 1958 to 1961. In his senior season, he led the 1961 Alabama Crimson Tide football team to a perfect record of 11–0 and the national championship, and finished fifth in the voting for the Heisman Trophy. A third-generation physician, he died of metastatic testicular cancer at age 28, shortly after earning his medical degree.

== Early life ==
Trammell was born in Scottsboro, Alabama, as the middle son of a prominent local physician, Dr. Edward Lee Trammell. He quickly excelled both in athletics and academics and he wished to become a physician like his brother, father, and father's grandfather.

Trammell was the starting varsity quarterback at Scottsboro High School where he earned All-County, All-State, All-Southern and All-American honors during his four-year prep career. He broke a string of records; having thrown 5 touchdown passes in a single game(twice) and 40 touchdown passes during his high school career. As a high school senior, he was also named most valuable basketball player in state of Alabama.

== Playing career ==
Trammell's football career at the University of Alabama began in early 1958, before Paul "Bear" Bryant's announcement of returning to his alma mater to take over as head coach of the ailing football program. Trammell's family recalls a personal visit at the time and a 'pep talk' from Bryant saying that, "if you'll commit to Alabama, then I'll come back to Alabama." Trammell had actually planned to attend Georgia Tech after being heavily recruited by Hall of Fame head coach Bobby Dodd. However, he made a career-altering decision that would change the rest of his life.

Bryant's influence would once again bring the program into the national spotlight and Trammell was his first star player. In the fall of 1958, Bryant had promised the team the impossible notion, if they could "stick it out", as told by team-mates Billy Neighbors, Bill Oliver and Mal Moore.that they would win a national championship within four years. This was going to be an uphill battle because Alabama was coming off of four straight losing seasons. In 1959, when Trammell was a sophomore, he led Alabama in total offense and then led in total scoring in the 1960 season, including a win against the Fran Tarkenton-led Georgia Bulldogs. In 1961, Trammell led the team to a perfect season and a national championship, the first in 20 years for Alabama.

On December 5, 1961, at the National Football Foundation's reception in the Grand Ballroom at the Waldorf-Astoria in New York, with President John F. Kennedy attending, Bryant and Trammell accepted the MacArthur Trophy in recognition of Alabama's perfect season and national championship. The black tie event was hosted by Bob Hope and was also attended by General Douglas MacArthur, Vince Lombardi, head coach of the Green Bay Packers, Sidney L. James, the founding editor and publisher of Sports Illustrated and dozens of other College Football Hall of Fame Inductees. (Of interest, a similar semi-fictional scene was digitally remastered in Winston Groom's film, Forrest Gump, in 1994, with President John F. Kennedy digitally morphed into the set with Tom Hanks, who played Forrest Gump, a celebrated fictional Alabama football player, who had accepted a handshake from the President and was asked "how does it feel to be an All-American?". Winston Groom had been a freshman at the University of Alabama in 1961 during this era.)

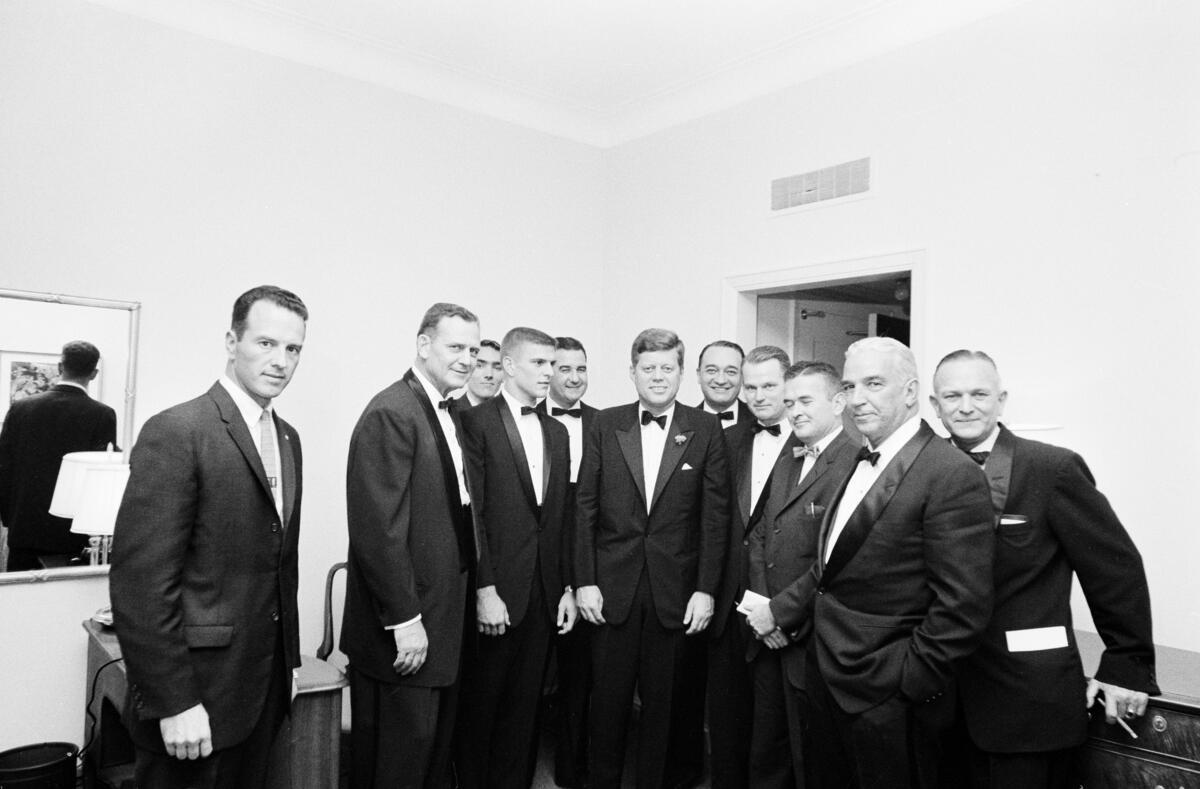
President John F. Kennedy stands with attendees of the Football Hall of Fame Dinner. L-R: White House Army Signal Agency (WHASA) staff member, Jack Rubley; University of Alabama football coach, Bear Bryant; WHASA staff member, John J. Cochran (in back); University of Alabama quarterback, Pat Trammell; University of Alabama President, Dr. Frank Rose; President Kennedy; sportscaster, Mel Allen; Young Boozer, Jr.; Birmingham News sports writer, Benny Marshall; Alabama businessman, Tom Russell; and Jeff Coleman.

Trammell who was selected Academic All-American, was named the 1961 SEC Most Valuable Player, SEC Player of the Year, All-SEC (First Team) Back of 1961 season (AP, UPI) and All-SEC Academic Selection. He was voted as the 1961 Collegiate Player of the year by the Touchdown Club of Atlanta. He was chosen as the 1961 Most Valuable Back by the Birmingham Monday Morning Quarterback Club and received the Most Valuable Player Award for 1961 by the Nashville Banner. He finished fifth in the voting for the Heisman Trophy, which was won by halfback Ernie Davis of Syracuse. Although the Birmingham Touchdown Club SEC player of the year award did not begin until 1979, he has been publicly honored and recognized by this organization on multiple occasions. By becoming the 1961 permanent Team Captain, Pat Trammell had his handprints and cleat-prints stamped into the Walk of Fame as "most outstanding player." (the last time that this designation was ever made.)

Several interviews with family members and players that knew him explain what they say made him so exceptional and "unbeatable" in the eyes of his fans. He had focused on the cognitive component of the fundamentals of the game by using his eidetic "photographic" memory and field presence. He is also praised for his overall tactical analysis, anticipation and awareness. Bryant did not consider himself a superior athlete, but felt his talent was that he was often able to find the necessary resources to frequently deliver a win for his team. Bryant would continue to build on this foundation for the rest of his career and also reportedly advised teammates on how to improve their game. ^{p. 88, p. 90}

Teammate Billy Neighbors ('59–'61) would later say that Pat Trammell was the "smartest and best football player I'd ever played with .... period and I played with some great players, like Bob Griese and Babe Parilli. Pat Trammell was still the smartest football player .... it was just the way he ran the team, the offense." ^{p. 89}

Butch Wilson ('59 - '62) knew Trammell well while they played together in the backfield. When later comparing him to his teammates in the NFL, such as Johnny Unitas and Fran Tarkenton, Wilson would say that Trammell was the toughest, most competitive quarterback with whom he had ever played. “They weren’t the caliber that Trammell was,” said Wilson. “They had a lot of ability, but it wasn’t that old hard-nosed style. He was almost like a lineman turned into a quarterback."

Incoming quarterback, Joe Namath, was heavily influenced by Trammell during their overlapping season of 1961. "Pat's leadership was exemplified by his toughness," said Namath. "He was a demanding mentor and certainly made me a better quarterback. I miss that smile of his."

Before the Draft, Vince Lombardi would pressure Coach Bryant to persuade Pat to come to play for him with the Green Bay Packers after graduation. Coach Bryant responded, "Pat is too smart to play professional football ... he will go on to medical school to fulfill his personal goals." Trammell majored in Chemical Engineering and Pre-Med and would graduate from the University of Alabama with the highest honors possibly attainable including the President's List, Phi Beta Kappa, summa cum laude and Jason's Men's Honor Society. Of interest, he was drafted by the AFL Dallas Texans, but would never sign.

In one poll, the 1961 Alabama Team was voted as "the Best All-Time SEC football team" to ever play for the Southeastern Conference, and, in another, the third best college football team of all time. To have turned around a decade of losing streaks from scratch and collectively outscore their opponents 297 to 25, Coach Bryant and this team have been thought to have pioneered the revolutionary turning point for the modern day University of Alabama football championship dynasty. Coach Bryant would go on to win the National Coach of the Year Award for 1961, which was his first of three, as well as his first of eight awards for the SEC Coach of the Year. This would also be his first of six national championships, which were more than any other college football coach in history, until surpassed by Nick Saban in 2021.

=== Career statistics ===
Trammell set multiple records during his career at Alabama, mostly during his senior season. 1,314 total yards in a single season with 1,035 passing yards was, at the time, a school record. At the conclusion of his final season, he would hold the record as the best quarterback in the entire Crimson Tide history, compiling a 26–2–4 record for a .875 winning percentage as a starter. This record stood 33 years until it was broken by Jay Barker in 1994, with a 35–2–1 record for a .934 winning percentage. Jay Barker would be later awarded the prestigious Pat Trammell Award.

Currently, Trammell still holds two records at the university. Having thrown only two interceptions out of 133 passes in 1960 is currently the lowest interception percentage at just 1.5%, setting the single season record. He also holds the career record for lowest interception percentage, throwing only four out of 225 passes totaling 1.8%.

Season	Passing					Rushing			
Season	Att–Comp	Yards	Pct.	TD	Int	Att	Yards	Avg	TD
1959	21–49	293	42.9	1	1	156	525	3.4	2
1960	21–43	303	48.8	0	1	76	315	4.1	4
1961	75–133	1,035	56.4	8	2	75	279	3.7	9
Total	117–225	1,631	52.0	9	4	307	1,119	3.6	15

== Death ==
Trammell died of complications from metastatic testicular cancer on December 10, 1968, at the age of 28 – only two years after earning his M.D. degree from the Medical College of Alabama, today's University of Alabama School of Medicine. He was completing a residency in dermatology and planned to continue practicing medicine as a third generation doctor. He left behind a wife and two young children.

Hundreds attended his funeral in Scottsboro; even Auburn University's head coach Ralph "Shug" Jordan put rivalry aside to attend the service. Condolences came in from around the state and country, including personal letters and telegrams from Alabama Governors George Wallace, Albert Brewer, and Jim Folsom, Congressmen Robert E. Jones Jr. and Ben Cherner and President-elect Richard Nixon. A resolution from the Alabama House of Representatives was written into law on April 1, 1969, acknowledging the tragic loss and its impact on the populace of the state of Alabama.

The following is an excerpt from the eulogy at his funeral spoken by the then University President Dr. Frank Rose:

Pat lifted us to great heights on the football field, but perhaps his greatest moment of all came at the Football Hall of Fame dinner where we were receiving the highest honor, the MacArthur Bowl [trophy]. There were about 2,000 people attending the banquet, including President Kennedy, and General MacArthur himself. The crowd didn't bother Pat. Most young men would have been intimidated. He casually walked up to the microphone in front of this huge crowd and told everyone there he was very appreciative of what everyone had done for him, coach Bryant and the University.

Following that, President Kennedy came to my room at the hotel and personally sought out Pat. I never saw the President after that [before his death], where he didn't want to know how Pat Trammell was doing.

He had character and intelligence. He lived a full life. He thrilled people from all walks of life. He was able to share more moments of happiness than most men who live one hundred years. His achievements will be as dear to my memory as all the football games we'll ever win and all the expansion we'll have in the future. But all this is part of the making of a great institution like the University of Alabama....the life and story of Pat Trammell.

— Dr. Frank Rose, President, University of Alabama, December 11, 1968.

Afterward, with tears streaming down his face, Paul "Bear" Bryant escorted Pat's mother out church with standing room in Scottsboro. This is reported to be the only time that Coach Bryant had ever been seen weeping in public.

In Bryant's autobiography The Bear, he stated that the day Pat died was "the saddest day of my life."

After Coach Bryant celebrated his 300th college football victory, in 1980, a reprint of an interview by author Clyde Bolton was published in The Birmingham News when he was reflecting back on his success as a football coach, leader and mentor. During this interview he was put on the spot and asked if he had a "favorite player." Coach Bryant named off a number of players that he thought of highly during the previous 22 years at Alabama and during his 30 year coaching career. He took a pause at that point and said, "[now] You'll have to forgive me here for getting sentimental." [sic] He then responded in turn with a deliberate answer to the question, " .... Pat Trammell was [not just my favorite player, but] the favorite person...... of my entire life."

== Legacy ==
The legacy of Pat Trammell has lived on since his death. His eventual influence and impact would be later brought to life in many non-fiction books, sports history books, documentaries, news articles and movies (one being The Bear, starring Gary Busey as Bear Bryant and Jon-Erik Hexum playing Trammell).

- In 1965, the Pat Trammell Room was dedicated upon completion of the Paul W. Bryant Hall for on-campus football player residence.
- In 1968, Trammell was elected as Alumni President of the University of Alabama letterman's A-Club but would never serve due to his death.
- In December 1968, two weeks after his death, the Alabama A-Club Educational and Charitable Foundation was set in motion by teammates Tommy Brooker, James A. Sharpe, Joseph K. Sims, and Billy Neighbors. Coach Bryant and his teammates recognized the need for a charitable program that would lend support and offer educational scholarships.to the families and children of former University of Alabama football players. An initial contribution of $1,000,000 in 1973 ($7.25 million in 2025 dollars) was established by Coach Bryant with Trammell's family and children in mind. The Foundation that lives on today.has evolved into a world class charitable support system for the University of Alabama Department of Athletics.
- Beginning in 1970, Scottsboro High School implemented the annual Pat Trammell Award to the most outstanding scholar-athlete of the year to generate interest in becoming a future Academic All-American.
- After the completion of the new football stadium in Scottsboro in 1971, it was named and dedicated as Trammell Stadium.
- In 1975, Trammell was posthumously inducted into the Alabama Sports Hall of Fame.
- In 2009, the theatrical performance of Bear Country starring Rodney Clark as Coach Bryant, drew unexpected popularity. During the true to life play, Coach Bryant was approaching retirement and reflected back over his life and career. has been drawn. Out of the hundreds of players that he had coached and known so well over 45 years, he would only mention one by name. A dramatic and emotional scene in the play expresses his inner regard for Trammell. It has been said that losing Pat ended up being so emotionally devastating that for Coach Bryant that it was as if he had lost his own son.
- On November 1, 2014, Pat Trammell was inducted into the Jackson County Sports Hall Fame as an inaugural member.
- Beginning in 2008, a Sports Medicine Fellowship and Chair in recognition of Dr. Pat Trammell has been endowed at the University of Alabama School of Medicine, Tuscaloosa Campus ( between the College of Community Health Sciences and the Department of Intercollegiate Athletics.) As described by the Athletic Director Emeritus, the late Mal Moore, "the Dr. Patrick Lee Trammell Sr., Excellence in Sports Medicine Program promotes specialized Sports Medicine education, on-the-field 'hands-on' training, and practical experience for future Sports Medicine Team Physicians." The first resident physician was awarded the fellowship and entered the program in June 2010.

=== Recipients of the endowed Dr. Patrick Lee Trammell Sr., Sports Medicine Fellowship ===
- 2010 - Dr. Ray Stewart
- 2011 - Dr. Eric Law
- 2012 - Dr. Zach Boylan and Dr. Brent Smith
- 2013 - Dr. Scott Boyken
- 2014 - Dr. Blake Perry and Dr. Jeremy Latron Coleman
- 2015 - Dr. Hunter Russell and Dr. Matt Andres
- 2016 - Dr. Brett Bentley
- 2017 - Dr. Keirsten Smith
- 2018 - Dr. Michael Bradburn and Dr. Aloiya Earl
- 2019 - Dr. Russ Guin and Dr. Tom Bollaert
- 2020 - Dr. Matt Gilbert, Dr. Rudy Harrison and Dr. Hajat Avdovic
- 2021 - Dr. Morgan Benefield
- 2022 - Dr. Courtney Conklin and Dr. Thomas Lindsey
- 2023 - Dr. William Tremlett and Dr. Dalton Lohsandt
- 2024 - Dr. Josh Washington, Dr. Cole Marshall and Dr. Colton Eubanks

=== Annual Pat Trammell Award, of the University of Alabama Football Program ===
The Pat Trammell Award is presented by the University of Alabama Alumni Association and Department of Athletics to an outstanding Alabama football player who demonstrates the qualities of Integrity, Character, Importance of Academics and Inspirational Leadership that are representative of Trammell himself. The following is the partial list of recipients:

- 1988 - David Smith
- 1989 - John Mangum
- 1990 - Roger Shultz
- 1991 - Kevin Turner
- 1992 - George Wilson
- 1993 - Tobie Sheils
- 1994 - Jay Barker
- 1995 - John Walters
- 1996 - John Causey
- 1997 - Curtis Alexander
- 1998 - John David Phillips
- 1999 - Shaun Alexander
- 2000 - Paul Hogan
- 2001 - Andrew Zow
- 2002 - Sam Collins
- 2004 - Antonio Carter
- 2005 - Matt Miller
- 2006 - Tim Castille
- 2007 - Keith Saunders and Matt Caddell
- 2008 - Bobby Greenwood and Travis McCall
- 2009 - Drew Davis and Cory Reamer
- 2010 - Preston Dial and David Ross
- 2011 - Alex Watkins and Alfred McCullough
- 2012 - Michael Williams and Nico Johnson
- 2013 - Deion Belue and Kellen Williams
- 2014 - Brian Vogler and Brandon Ivory
- 2015 - Denzel Devall and Richard Mullaney
- 2016 - Gehrig Dieter and Dalvin Tomlinson
- 2017 - Robert Foster and J. C. Hassenauer
- 2018 - Joshua Casher and Jamey Mosley
- 2019 - Shyheim Carter and Jared Mayden
- 2020 - Thomas Fletcher, Josua McMillon, Chris Owens and Jaylen Waddle
- 2021 - Jalyn Armour-Davis, Kendall Randolph and LaBryan Ray
- 2022 - DeMarcco Hellams, Henry To'oTo'o and Byron Young
- 2023 - Justin Eboigbe, Malachi Moore and Roydell Williams
- 2024 - Jah-Marien Latham, Robbie Ouzts and Que Robinson

== See also ==
- Alabama Crimson Tide football yearly statistical leaders

== Video ==
- You Tube – Pat Trammell, Alabama national championship QB remembered
