= Mel Allen =

American sports announcer (1913–1996)

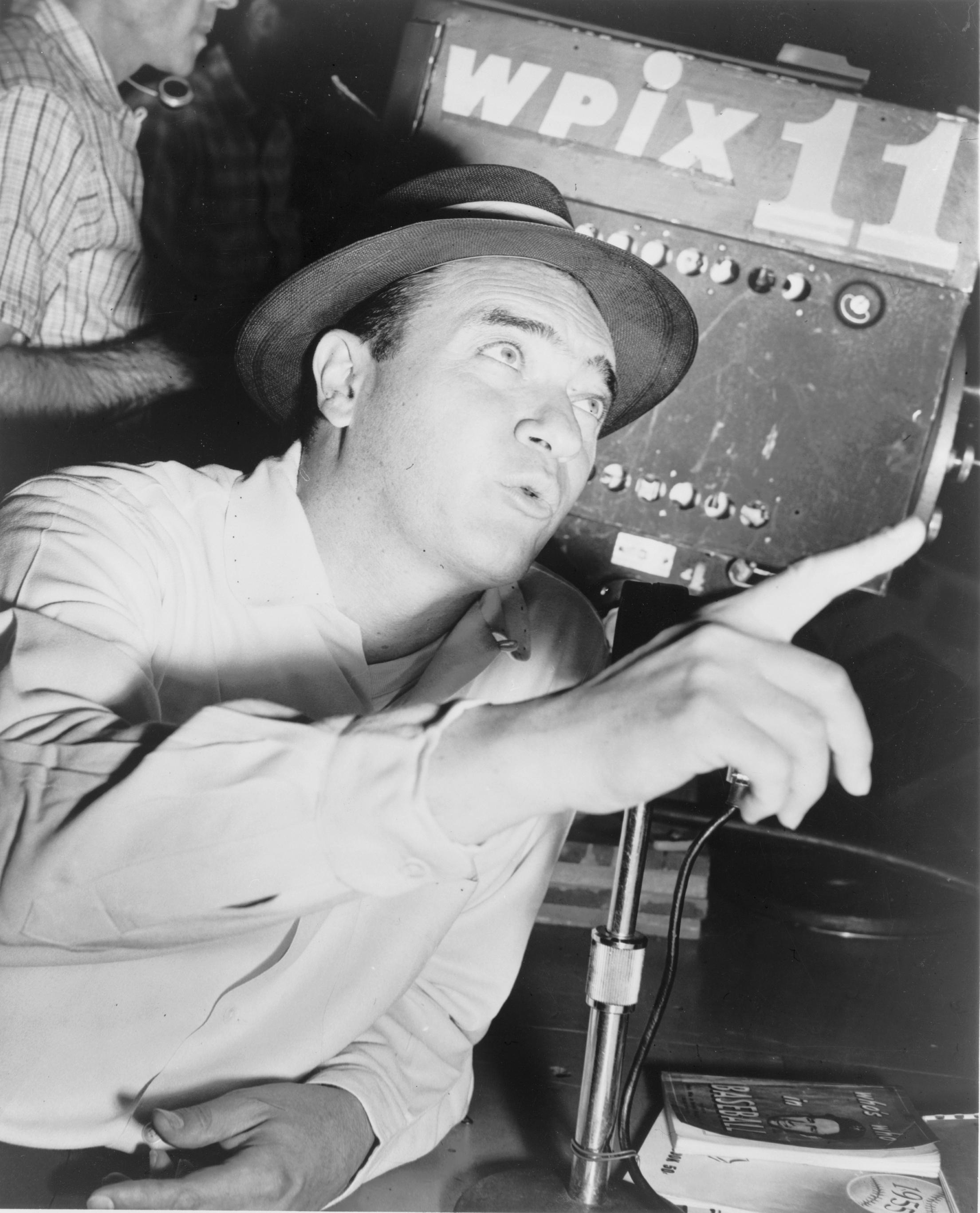
- Allen in 1955
- Born: Melvin Allen Israel; February 14, 1913; Birmingham, Alabama, U.S.
- Died: June 16, 1996 (aged 83); Greenwich, Connecticut, U.S.
- Education: University of Alabama
- Occupation: Sportscaster

Mel Allen (born Melvin Allen Israel; February 14, 1913 – June 16, 1996) was an American sportscaster, best known for his long tenure as the primary play-by-play announcer for the New York Yankees. During the peak of his career in the 1940s, 1950s and 1960s, Allen was arguably the most prominent member of his profession, his voice familiar to millions. Years after his death, he is still promoted as having been "The Voice of the Yankees."

In his later years, Allen was the first host of This Week in Baseball.

== Early life and career ==
Allen was born Melvin Allen Israel in Birmingham, Alabama. He attended the University of Alabama, where he was a member of the Kappa Nu fraternity as an undergraduate.

During his time at Alabama, Israel served as the public address announcer for Alabama Crimson Tide football games. In 1933, when the station manager or sports director of Birmingham's radio station WBRC asked Alabama coach Frank Thomas to recommend a new play-by-play announcer, he suggested Allen. His first broadcast was Alabama's home opener that year, against the Tulane Green Wave.

Allen graduated from the University of Alabama School of Law in 1937. Shortly after graduating, Allen took a train to New York City for a week's vacation. While on that vacation, he auditioned for a staff announcer's position at the CBS Radio Network. CBS executives already knew of Allen; the network's top sportscaster, Ted Husing, had heard many of his Crimson Tide broadcasts. He was hired at $45 (equivalent to $1,008 in 2025) a week. He often did non-sports announcing such as for big band remotes, or "emceeing" game shows such as Truth or Consequences, serving as an understudy for both sportscaster Husing and newscaster Bob Trout.

In his first year at CBS, Allen announced the crash of the Hindenburg when the station cut away from singer Kate Smith's show. He first became a national celebrity when he ad libbed for a half-hour during the rain-delayed Vanderbilt Cup from an airplane. In 1939, he was the announcer for the Warner Brothers & Vitaphone film musical short-subject, On the Air, with Leith Stevens and the Saturday Night Swing Club.

Stephen Borelli, in his biography How About That?! (a favorite expression of Allen's after an outstanding play by the home team), states that it was at CBS's suggestion in 1937, the year Melvin Israel joined the network, that he go by a different last name on the air. He chose Allen, his father's middle name as well as his own, and legally changed his name to Melvin Allen in 1943.

== Broadcasting career ==
=== Baseball ===
Allen was used as a color commentator for CBS's radio broadcast of the 1938 World Series. This led Wheaties to tap him to replace Arch McDonald, who was moving on to New York as the first full-time radio voice of both the Yankees and the New York Giants for their home games, as the voice of the Washington Senators for the 1939 season. Senators' owner Clark Griffith wanted Walter Johnson, a former Senators pitcher, instead of Allen, and Wheaties relented.

In June 1939, Garnett Marks, McDonald's partner on Yankee broadcasts, twice mispronounced Ivory Soap, the Yankees' sponsor at the time, as "Ovary Soap." He was fired, and Allen was tapped to replace him. McDonald himself went back to Washington after only one season, and Allen became the Yankees' and Giants' lead announcer, doing double duty for both teams because only their home games were broadcast at that time.

He periodically recounted an anecdote that occurred during his first full season (1940) as Yankee play-by-play man. Hall of Fame first baseman Lou Gehrig had been forced to retire the year before after having been diagnosed with amyotrophic lateral sclerosis, a fatal illness. Speaking with Allen in the Yankee dugout, Gehrig told him "Mel, I never got a chance to listen to your games before because I was playing every day. But I want you to know they're the only thing that keeps me going." Allen broke down in tears after Gehrig departed.

Allen's stint with the Yankees and Giants was interrupted in 1941, when no sponsor could be found and both teams went off the air, but the broadcasts resumed in 1942. Allen was the voice of both the Yankees and the Giants until 1943, when he entered the United States Army during World War II, broadcasting on The Army Hour and Armed Forces Radio.

After the war, Allen called Yankee games exclusively. By this time, road games were added to the broadcast schedule. Before long Allen and the Yankees were fused in the public consciousness, an association strengthened by the team's frequent World Series appearances. Allen eventually called 22 World Series on radio or television, including all but one in the 17-year stretch between 1947 and 1963, and also called 24 All-Star Games. Interestingly, Allen's play-by-play of the 1948 World Series between the Cleveland Indians and the Boston Braves alongside Boston Braves announcer Jim Britt occurred because neither Cleveland Indians announcer was selected by MLB commissioner Happy Chandler; Jack Graney was ineligible due to having been a former player, and Jimmy Dudley was passed over due to a lack of experience.

In 1952, Allen was one of the first three celebrities spoofed in the just-created Mad satirical comic book. In the second issue, Allen, Giant manager Leo Durocher and Hall of Fame Yankee catcher Yogi Berra were all caricatured in a baseball story, "Hex!", illustrated by Jack Davis. His likeness was also licensed by Standard Comics for a two-issue "Mel Allen's Sports Comics" series between 1949 and 1950.

After Russ Hodges departed from the Yankee booth to become the longtime voice of the New York (and starting in 1958, San Francisco) Giants, the young Curt Gowdy replaced him as Allen's broadcast partner in 1949 & 1950, having been brought in from Oklahoma City after winning a national audition. Gowdy, originally from Wyoming, credited Mel Allen's mentoring as a big factor in his own success as a broadcaster and became the voice of the Boston Red Sox from 1951 to 1965. Red Barber, the former Brooklyn Dodgers announcer who had served as Allen's crosstown rival and frequent World Series broadcast partner, joined the Yankees' booth in 1954 and teamed with Allen until Barber's dismissal a decade later.

Allen called the second half of Game 7 of the 1960 World Series, as broadcasting duties were split between Allen and Pittsburgh broadcaster Bob Prince. Bill Mazeroski hit a walk-off home run off Ralph Terry to win the fall classic for the Pittsburgh Pirates. It was the only walk-off home run ever to occur in a Game 7 of a World Series.

There's a drive into deep left field, look out now…! That ball is going… going gone! And the World Series is over! Mazeroski… hits it over the left field fence for a home run, and the Pirates win it 10–9 and win the World Series…!

— Mel Allen calling Bill Mazeroski's game winning home run in Game 7 of the 1960 World Series on NBC television.

Allen lost his voice late in the fourth and last game of the 1963 World Series, in which the Dodgers swept the Yankees in four games and their longtime announcer, Vin Scully, paired with Allen on the national telecast, spontaneously took over from him for the end of the game after he could no longer talk, telling him soothingly, "That's all right, Mel." (Scully had announced the first half of the game, and Allen had begun to announce the second half.)

Among Allen's many catchphrases were "Hello there, everybody!" to start a game, "How a-bout that?!" on outstanding Yankee plays, "There's a drive, hit deep to right. That ball is go-ing, go-ing, gonnne!!" for Yankee home runs, for full counts, "Three and two. What'll he do?" and after a robust Yankee swing and miss, "He took a good cut!"

=== Other sports ===
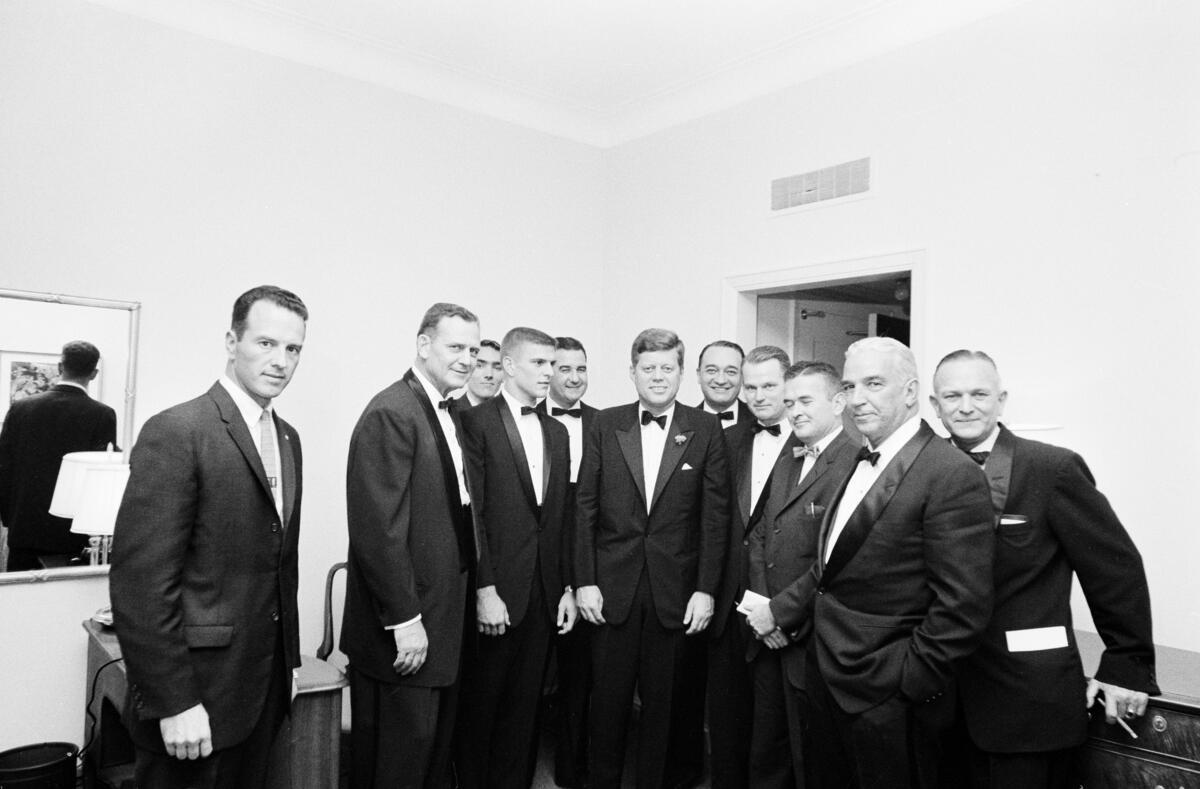
President John F. Kennedy stands with attendees of the Football Hall of Fame Dinner. L-R: White House Army Signal Agency (WHASA) staff member, Jack Rubley; University of Alabama football coach, Bear Bryant; WHASA staff member, John J. Cochran (in back); University of Alabama quarterback, Pat Trammell; University of Alabama President, Dr. Frank Rose; President Kennedy; sportscaster, Mel Allen; Alabama Sports Hall of Famer, Young Boozer Jr.; Birmingham News sports writer, Benny Marshall; Alabama businessman, Tom Russell; and Jeff Coleman.

Allen variously called regular-season college football for the DuMont, NBC, and ABC networks throughout the 1950s and early '60s. He also broadcast a number of bowl games, including 14 Rose Bowls, two Orange Bowls, and two Sugar Bowls. In the National Football League, Allen served as play-by-play announcer for the Washington Redskins in 1952 and 1953 and for the New York Giants on WCBS-AM in 1960, with some of the Giants' broadcasts also carried nationally by the CBS Radio Network. He also did radio play-by-play for the Miami Dolphins and for the Miami Hurricanes.

Allen hosted Jackpot Bowling on NBC in 1959 after Leo Durocher had left to return to major league baseball coaching, but his lack of bowling knowledge made him an unpopular host and Bud Palmer replaced him as the show's host in April.

Allen narrated a film about the 1961 Maccabiah Games which took place in Israel, titled The Sixth World Maccabiah Games.

=== Non-sports work ===
In the early 1940s, Allen hosted Thirty Minutes to Play on CBS radio. The program featured "interviews of sports and musical personalities." In the early 1940s Mel Allen announced a few Glenn Miller radio programs as well.

In 1947, Allen was a disc jockey on 1010 WINS in New York City, with a 2–5 p.m. program daily. An ad for the station in Broadcasting called the show "the initial step in our plans for bloc [sic] programming."

In the early 1960s, Allen hosted the three-hour Saturday morning segment of the weekend NBC Radio program Monitor. He also contributed sportscasts to the program until the late 1960s. Allen also provided voiceover narration for Fox Movietone newsreels for many years.

Allen appeared in a cameo role in the 1988 comedy film The Naked Gun: From the Files of Police Squad!.

In 1994, he voiced the stadium announcer for the Broadway revival of Damn Yankees, as himself.

=== Fired by the Yankees ===
On September 21, 1964—prior to the start of the World Series—the Yankees informed Allen that his contract with the team would not be renewed for 1965. In those days, the main announcers for both Series participants always called the World Series on NBC television. Although Allen was thus technically eligible to call the 1964 World Series, Baseball Commissioner Ford Frick honored the Yankees' request to have retired Yankee star shortstop Phil Rizzuto, Allen's sidekick in the radio booth, join the Series crew instead. It would be one of only four Yankee World Series going back to 1938 that Allen had not broadcast, and the first since 1943 (which he'd missed due to his Army service).

On December 17, 1964, after much media speculation and many letters to the Yankees from fans disgruntled by Allen's absence from the Series, the Yankees issued a terse press release announcing Allen's firing; he was replaced by Joe Garagiola. NBC and Movietone dropped him soon afterward. To this day, the Yankees have never given an explanation for the sudden firing, and rumors abounded. Depending on the rumor, Allen was either homosexual, an alcoholic, a drug addict, or had a nervous breakdown.

Years later, Allen told author Curt Smith that the Yankees had fired him under pressure from the team's longtime sponsor, Ballantine Beer. According to Allen, he was fired as a cost-cutting move by Ballantine, which had been experiencing poor sales for years (it would eventually be sold in 1969). Smith, in his book Voices of Summer, also indicated that the medications Allen took to see him through his busy schedule may have affected his on-air performance. (Stephen Borelli, another biographer, has also pointed out that Allen's heavy workload did not allow him time to take care of his health.)

Allen became Merle Harmon's partner for Milwaukee Braves games in 1965, and worked Cleveland Indians games on television in 1968. But he would not commit to either team full-time, nor to the Oakland Athletics, who also wanted to hire him after the team's move from Kansas City. Despite the firing in 1964, Allen remained loyal to the Yankees for the remainder of his life, and to this day—years after his death—he is still popularly known as "the Voice of the Yankees."

The Yankees eventually brought Allen back to emcee special Yankee Stadium ceremonies, including Old-Timers' Day, which Allen had originally handled when he was lead announcer. Although Yankee broadcaster Frank Messer, who joined the club in 1968, replaced him as emcee for Old-Timers' Day and other special events like Mickey Mantle Day, the Yankees continued to invite Allen to call the actual exhibition game between the Old Timers, and to take part in players' number-retirement ceremonies.

=== Return to the Yankees ===
Allen was brought back to the Yankees' on-air team in 1976 as a pre/post-game host for the cable telecasts with John Sterling, and also started calling play-by-play again. He announced Yankees cable telecasts on SportsChannel New York (now MSG Plus) with Phil Rizzuto, Bill White, Frank Messer, and occasionally, Fran Healy.

Allen remained with the Yankees' play-by-play crew until 1985 and made occasional appearances on Yankee telecasts and commercials into the late 1980s. In 1990, Allen called play-by-play for a WPIX Yankees game to officially make him baseball's first seven-decade announcer. Among the memorable moments Allen called in his latter stretch were Yankee outfielder Reggie Jackson's 400th home run in 1980, and Yankee pitcher Dave Righetti's no-hitter on July 4, 1983.

== This Week in Baseball ==
In his later years, Allen was exposed to a new audience as the host of the syndicated highlights show This Week in Baseball, which he hosted from its inception in 1977 until his death. When FOX relaunched TWIB in 2000 (after a one-year hiatus), it used a claymation version of Allen to open and close the show until 2002.

== Computer games ==
Allen recorded the play-by-play for two computer baseball games, Tony La Russa Baseball and Old Time Baseball, which were published by Stormfront Studios. The games included his signature "How about that?!" home run call. He also used the same catch-phrase during his cameo appearances in the films The Naked Gun (1988) and Needful Things (1993).

Producer Don Daglow said in a 1995 interview with Computer Gaming World that

Allen was a dream to work with. If something sounded the least bit off, he caught it himself and self-corrected before you even had a chance to ask for another take. Sometimes he'd hear a problem live that we would only have noticed later. When he was reading the long list of numbers that would be spliced into sentences to announce batting averages and so on, he stopped suddenly and said, 'That's not good.' Then he started again and finished the list. When we checked the tape we heard that he had just started to get a sing-song rhythm from repeating too many numbers in a row, and he'd noticed before anyone else had.

== Awards ==
The National Sportscasters and Sportswriters Association inducted Allen into its Hall of Fame in 1972. In 1978, he was one of the first two winners of the Baseball Hall of Fame's Ford C. Frick Award for broadcasting, along with Red Barber. In 1985, Allen was inducted into the American Sportscasters Association Hall of Fame along with former Yankee partner (and later Red Sox and NBC Sports voice) Curt Gowdy and Chicago legend Jack Brickhouse. He was inducted into the National Radio Hall of Fame in 1988. In 2009, the American Sportscasters Association ranked Allen as the #2 greatest sportscaster of all time, second only to Vin Scully.

== Death and legacy ==
Allen died of heart failure at age 83 on June 16, 1996; he had undergone open-heart surgery in 1989. His one-week vacation to New York had turned into 60 years; he had settled in New York after landing a job at CBS Radio and lived there and in southwestern Connecticut for the rest of his life.

Allen was buried at Temple Beth El Cemetery in Stamford, Connecticut. On July 25, 1998, the Yankees dedicated a plaque in his memory at Monument Park at Yankee Stadium. The plaque calls him "A Yankee institution, a national treasure" and includes his much-spoken line "How about that?!"

== Film roles ==
- The Babe Ruth Story (1948) – New York Yankees Radio Announcer
- The Flamingo Kid (1984) – Himself (voice)
- The Naked Gun (1988) – The Baseball Announcer #4
- Born on the Fourth of July (1989) – Himself (voice)
- Needful Things (1993) – Baseball Announcer
