= Shiloh, Marengo County, Alabama =

Unincorporated community in Alabama, United States

Shiloh, Alabama
- Unincorporated community
- Location within the state of Alabama Shiloh (the United States)
- Coordinates: 32°7′38.5″N 87°44′7.01″W
- Country: United States
- State: Alabama
- County: Marengo
- Elevation: 404 ft (123 m)
- Time zone: UTC-6 (Central (CST))
  - Summer (DST): UTC-5 (CDT)
- Area code: 334

Shiloh is an unincorporated community in Marengo County, Alabama, United States. Historically, Shiloh was served by its own post office.

== Geography ==
Shiloh is located at 32.12736°N 87.73528°W and has an elevation of 404 feet (123 m).

== Notable person ==
- Autherine Lucy, first African American student to attend the University of Alabama
