= Arthur Shores =

American civil rights attorney (1904–1996)

Arthur Davis Shores
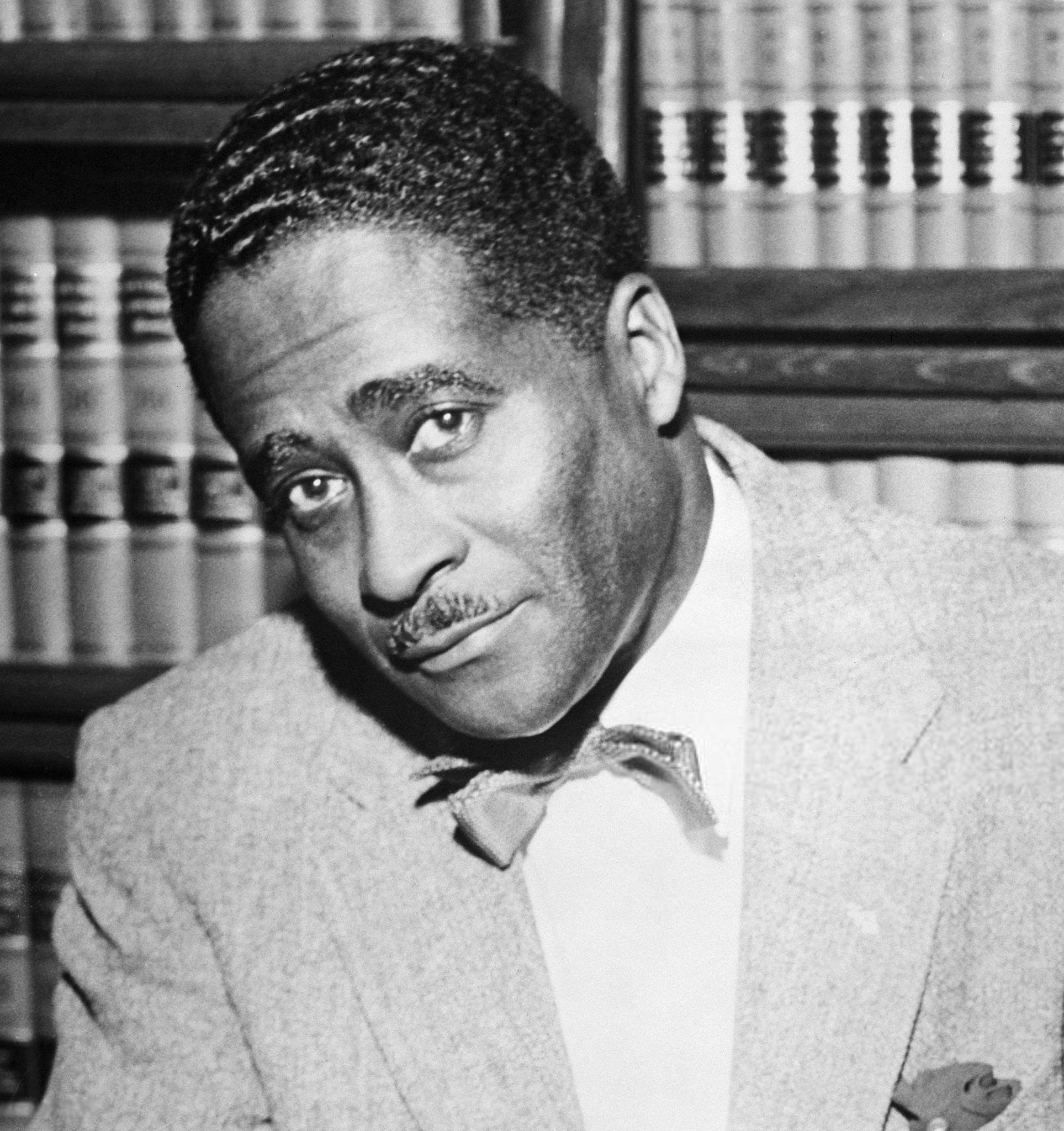
- Shores in 1956
- Born: September 25, 1904; Birmingham, Alabama, United States
- Died: December 16, 1996 (aged 92); Birmingham, Alabama, United States
- Education: Talladega College; La Salle Extension University
- Occupation: Civil rights attorney
- Spouse: Theodora Warren Shores
- Children: Helen Shores Lee (1941–2018), Barbara S. Shores

Arthur Davis Shores (September 25, 1904 – December 16, 1996) was an American civil rights attorney who was considered Alabama's "drum major for justice". Admitted to the Alabama State Bar in 1937, Shores played a leading role in the fight for civil rights for African-Americans in Alabama and was the first African American to sit on the Birmingham City Council.

== Education ==
Shores graduated from Talladega College where he became a member of Alpha Phi Alpha fraternity. He attended only one year of law school at the University of Kansas and then pursued his law studies through La Salle Extension University’s correspondence school.

== Legal career ==
External videos
- “Filmed interview with Arthur Shores" conducted for Eyes on the Prize in 1985. Discussion centers on his civil rights activism and Autherine Lucy's attempt to integrate the University of Alabama.

Shores passed the Alabama State Bar exam in 1937 and immediately began using his legal skills to support civil rights issues. In 1938, Shores successfully sued on behalf of seven Black school teachers who were denied the right to vote by the Alabama Board of Registrars, which was in violation of the state constitution and the Fourteenth and Fifteenth amendments to the United States Constitution.

Shores became the first Black attorney in Alabama to represent his own clients in court. Shortly thereafter, Shores' efforts led him to the U.S. Supreme Court, arguing for equal pay for Black and White teachers

Shores was general counsel for the International Association of Railway Employees (IARE). In 1941 he took on the case of Steele v. Louisville & N. R. Co. in which B. W. Steele, a member of the IARE executive, argued that an agreement between the railway and the Brotherhood of Locomotive Firemen and Enginemen was illegal: A whites-only railroad union could not exclude Blacks and then deny them better jobs because they were not union members. He worked on this case with attorney Charles H. Houston, who argued it successfully in front of the Supreme Court of the United States in 1944. Shores represented Black teachers in the Jefferson County School Board to receive the same pay as White teachers.

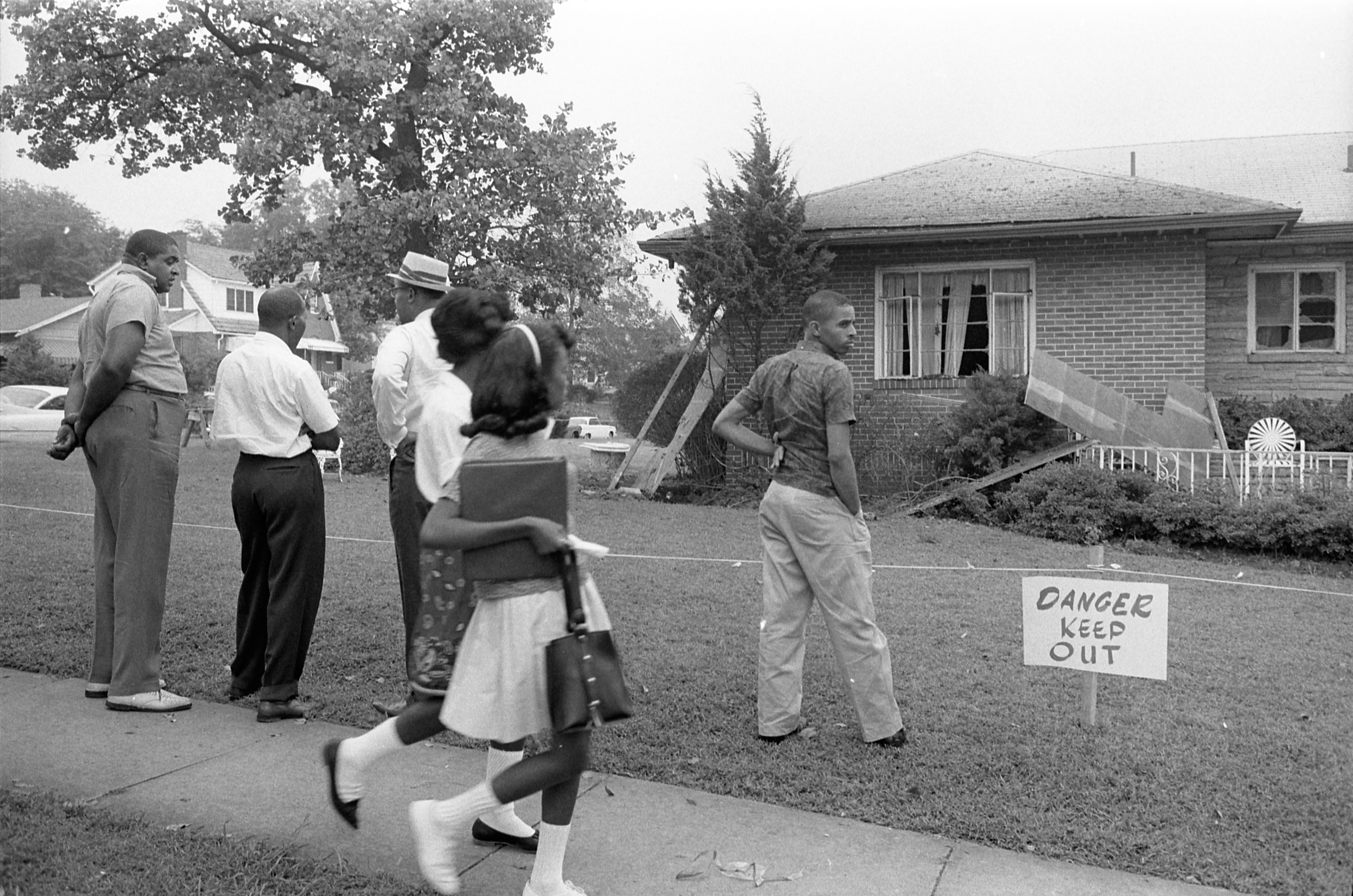
Birmingham, Alabama residents viewing the bomb-damaged home of Arthur Shores on September 5, 1963. The bomb exploded the previous day, September 4, injuring Shores' wife.

In 1955, Shores and Constance Mobley of the NAACP Legal Defense Fund successfully argued before the U.S. Supreme Court in Lucy v. Adams to prevent the University of Alabama from denying admission solely based on race or color. This ended the university's three-year legal fight to block the admission of Autherine Lucy and Pollie Anne Myers due to their race, although the university immediately found another excuse to disqualify Myers. Thus in 1956, Autherine Lucy became the first African-American to attend the school. On the third day of classes, a hostile mob assembled to prevent Lucy from attending classes. The police were called to secure her admission but, that evening, the University suspended Lucy on the grounds that it could not provide a safe environment.

Shores' campaign in 1963 to integrate the Birmingham public schools brought violence to him and other residents. Shores' home was fire-bombed with dynamite on August 20 and again on September 4 in retaliation for Black parents registering their children at White schools. The bombings—and demonstrations outside Birmingham schools—were used by Gov. George Wallace as a pretext to close the schools in defiance of the federal court desegregation order and to deploy state troopers in the city. Eleven days later, on September 15, 1963, a bomb killed four Black girls at 16th Street Baptist Church. Shores argued before the Supreme Court in the same year that the arrests of peaceful demonstrators in Birmingham should be ruled unconstitutional.

With the death of City Councilman R. W. Douglas while still in office on October 24, 1968, Shores, then 64 years old and very active in Alabama’s Democratic Party, was appointed by unanimous vote of the city’s all-white governing body to fill Douglas’s seat on the Birmingham City Council. With this vote, Shores became the first African American to sit on the City Council, a position he held until 1978.

== Personal life ==
Shores was married to Theodora Warren Shores, and they had two children, Helen Shores Lee and Barbara S. Shores. Theodora, like many women during this time in the United States, had to give up her job as a teacher because she had gotten married.

The Shores family lived in the Smithfield neighborhood of Birmingham, Alabama, an area that suffered nearly 50 unsolved Klan-related bombings between 1948 and 1963. The years of white-supremacist terrorist activity were an effort to stop Black families from buying homes along Center Street, the unofficial dividing line between Black and White neighborhoods in the city. The bombings earned the neighborhood a local nickname: “Dynamite Hill.”

== Death ==
Shores died on December 16, 1996 at the age of 92, at his home in Birmingham, Alabama. On the day of his death, Shores was attended at his death bed by his wife Theodora and daughter Helen. In her biography of her father, Helen recalls that in the final moments of Shores' life, he smiled at her, closed his eyes, and died peacefully in his sleep. After his death, his daughters Helen and Barbara wrote a full length work on Shores’ life and legal career, published in 2012.

== Honors ==
In 1977, the NAACP honored Shores by awarding him the William Robert Ming Advocacy Award for the spirit of financial and personal sacrifice displayed in his legal work.

In 2004, Shores was inducted into the Alabama Lawyers' Hall of Fame.
