= Lucy v. Adams =

- Supreme Court of the United States

Decided October 10, 1955
- Full case name: Lucy et al. v. Adams, Dean of Admissions, University of Alabama
- Citations: 350 U.S. 1 (more) 76 S. Ct. 33; 100 L. Ed. 2d 3; 1955 U.S. LEXIS 340

Case history
- Prior: Injunction granted, 134 F. Supp. 235 (N.D. Ala. 1955).

Holding
- The injunction which the District Court issued in this case, but suspended pending appeal to the Court of Appeals, is reinstated to the extent that it enjoins and restrains the respondent and others designated from denying these petitioners, solely on account of their race or color, the right to enroll in the University of Alabama and pursue courses of study there. The motion is denied.

Court membership
- Chief Justice Earl Warren Associate Justices Hugo Black · Stanley F. Reed; Felix Frankfurter · William O. Douglas; Harold H. Burton · Tom C. Clark; Sherman Minton · John M. Harlan II

Case opinion
- Majority: Warren, joined by unanimous

Lucy v. Adams, 350 U.S. 1 (1955), was a U.S. Supreme Court case that successfully established the right of all citizens to be accepted as students at the University of Alabama.

The case involved African American citizens Autherine Lucy and Polly Anne Myers, who were refused admission to the University of Alabama solely on account of their race or color.

The Supreme Court affirmed the lower court decision, saying that it enjoins and restrains the respondent and others designated from denying these petitioners, solely on account of their race or color, the right to enroll in the University of Alabama and pursue courses of study there.

== See also ==
- List of United States Supreme Court cases, volume 350
- Sipuel v. Board of Regents of the University of Oklahoma
- Sweatt v. Painter
- McLaurin v. Oklahoma State Regents
