= Pollie Anne Myers Pinkins =

American civil rights activist (1932–2003)

Pollie Anne Myers-Pinkins
- Born: Pollie Anne Myers; July 14, 1932
- Died: March 17, 2003 (aged 70); Detroit, Michigan, U.S.
- Other name: Pollie Myers
- Education: Miles College; Wayne State University (M.Ed.)
- Occupation: Civil rights activist
- Organization: NAACP
- Known for: Co-plaintiff in efforts to desegregate the University of Alabama (with Autherine Lucy)
- Movement: Civil rights movement
- Spouses: Edward Hudson (div. 1956): Robert Pinkins
- Children: 5

Pollie Anne Myers-Pinkins (née Myers; July 14, 1932 – March 17, 2003) was an American civil rights activist. She and Autherine Lucy were the first African Americans admitted to the University of Alabama in 1952, and both fought to desegregate the university. Pinkins and Lucy, working with the NAACP, sued the university for admission after it tried to revoke their acceptance. They fought their case up to the U.S. Supreme Court, which ordered the university to admit the two women. However, the university responded by rejecting Pinkins' admission under a new argument, and Pinkins' side did not restart legal challenges. Pinkins earned a master's degree in education from Wayne State University instead.

== Early life ==
Pinkins was born on July 14, 1932, to Alice Lamb and Henry Myers. She attended the historically black college of Miles College in Fairfield, Alabama. Pinkins became close friends with Autherine Lucy at school. As a sophomore, Pinkins helped lead the college's NAACP Youth Council chapter, and convinced Lucy to join.

== Desegregation of the University of Alabama ==
During her senior year, Pinkins proposed that they should both apply to graduate school at the University of Alabama, which had never accepted a black student. Lucy later said, "I thought she was joking at first, I really did." Lucy decided to commit to the plan when she realized Myers was serious. Pinkins applied to study journalism, and Lucy library science.

On September 24, 1952 Pinkins and Lucy applied to the University of Alabama without indicating their race and were accepted. The newspaper, the Birmingham World, which Pinkins worked at, celebrated their admission on the front page. Realizing who the applicants were, the University soon revoked the acceptance.

=== Suing to uphold their admission ===
Pinkins was a civil rights activist with the NAACP at the time, and the organization agreed to help the pair fight the university when they heard about the women's applications. Lucy and Pinkins's attorneys from the NAACP included renowned civil rights lawyers Constance Baker Motley, Arthur Shores and Thurgood Marshall. Their case, Lucy v. Adams, lasted three years. Partway through, Marshall helped win another case, Brown v. Board of Education, in front of the U.S. Supreme Court, making racial segregation in public schools illegal. This caused a federal court to side with Lucy and Pinkins against the university on June 29, 1955. Days later, the court amended the order to apply to all other African-American students seeking admission to the University of Alabama.

The university appealed the decision, and on October 10, 1955 the Supreme Court upheld the decision and ordered the University to admit the two women. The local Black community supported the pair, honoring them at a gathering at Birmingham's Sixteenth Street Baptist Church, where editor Emory Jackson of the Birmingham World introduced Lucy to the Reverend Dr. Martin Luther King Jr. The Jesse Smith Noyes Foundation gave Lucy and Pinkins full-ride scholarships, and Shores and Jackson helped the pair discuss registration day in advance with the dean of admissions at the university.

=== Further rejections and appeals ===
After the university was ordered to stop blocking Lucy and Pinkins due to their race, it hired private investigators to find reasons to disqualify the applicants. Using the university moral codes as justification, it was able to reject Pinkins on the grounds that a child she had conceived before marriage made her an unsuitable student. The university couldn't find a reason to reject Lucy.

At least two sources have said that the board knew Pinkins had the original idea to apply and was more outgoing and confident than Lucy. Thus it hoped Lucy's individual acceptance would mean little or nothing to her, and she would voluntarily decide not to attend. Pinkins, Lucy, Jackson, Arthur Brooks, and Fred Shuttlesworth drove to the university on February 1, 1956 with a car and money supplied by Henry Guinn. They met university officials and newspaper correspondents on the edge of campus, and headed to the registrar's office so that Lucy could register and Pinkins appeal her rejection. The university upheld Pinkins' rejection, and the NAACP later decided not to challenge it.

=== Desegregation and riot ===
Pinkins and others strongly encouraged Lucy to attend alone, and on February 3, 1956, Lucy enrolled as a graduate student in library science, becoming the first African American ever admitted to a white public school or university in Alabama.

During this period, the Ku Klux Klan burned crosses each night on campus, and three days after Lucy's enrollment, mobs of white community members rioted against Lucy in the most violent anti-integration event post-Brown. This let the university suspend Lucy from school for the excuse of student safety, and spawned more court cases between her and the university.

=== Legal aftermath ===
In one federal court petition, Lucy and the NAACP complained against four of the rioters, accusing them of helping the university remove her from campus. The rioters were four men who were not students at the university: Earl Watts, Ed Watts, Kenneth Thompson, and R. E. Chambliss. The men had been arrested and charged with disorderly conduct after kneeing Chaplain Gribbon in the groin during the riots. Chambliss was a Ku Klux Klan member who had earlier been fired for assaulting a reporter at a Klan rally, and later was the bomber at the Sixteenth Street Baptist Church bombing.

When Marshall later asked that the complaint against the rioters be dropped, the charges against them were dismissed. The four responded by filing four damage suits totalling $4 million in March 1956, filed in Birmingham's Superior Court against Pinkins, Lucy, their lawyers Marshall, Motley, and Shores, and the NAACP. The rioters claimed that the desegregationists were trying to stir up "litigation and strife" for "their own financial gain," echoing the university's justifications for expelling Lucy.

== Later life ==
After her activism at the University of Alabama ended, Pinkins moved to Detroit in 1956 and went on to get a master's degree in education from Wayne State University.

== Personal life ==
Pinkins was married twice. Her first marriage was to Edward Hudson, a steelworker who she sought to divorce in 1956. Her second marriage was to Robert Pinkins. She had five children, three sons and two daughters. Pinkins died in Detroit, Michigan on March 17, 2003.

== Legacy ==
The Black Alumni Association at the University of Alabama gives out a scholarship called the Pollie Anne Myers-Pinkins AAAN Endowed Scholarship in honor of Pinkins every year.
