= Autherine Lucy =

African-American activist (1929–2022)

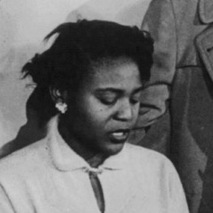
- Lucy in 1955
- Born: Autherine Juanita Lucy; October 5, 1929; Shiloh, Alabama, U.S.
- Died: March 2, 2022 (aged 92)
- Education: Selma University (AA); Miles College (BA); University of Alabama (MA)
- Occupations: Educator; professor
- Years active: 1956–2022
- Known for: First African-American student to attend the University of Alabama, 1956
- Relatives: Nikema Williams (grandniece)

Autherine Juanita Lucy (October 5, 1929 – March 2, 2022) was an American activist who was the first Black American student to attend the University of Alabama, in 1956. She and Pollie Myers were the first Black students admitted to the University of Alabama, but they had to fight the university in court to have their admission maintained once the university realized they were Black. Lucy was able to attend in 1956, but a violent mob of white community members targeted her on her fourth day of classes, enabling the university to suspend her. Her expulsion from the institution later that year led to the university's president Oliver Carmichael's resignation. Years later, the university admitted her as a master's student. In 2010, a clock tower was erected in her honor on its campus.

== Early life ==
Lucy was born in Shiloh, Alabama. Her father Milton Cornelius Lucy and mother Minnie Maud Hosea were sharecroppers; she was the youngest child in a family of five sons and four daughters. The family owned and farmed 110 acres. Lucy's father also did blacksmithing, and made baskets and ax handles to supplement their income.

After attending public school in Shiloh through grade ten, she attended Linden Academy in Linden, Alabama. She graduated in 1947, and went on to attend Selma University in Selma for two years, after which she studied at the historically black Miles College in Fairfield. She graduated from Miles with a Bachelor of Arts in English in 1952.

== Desegregation of the University of Alabama ==
Lucy became friends with Pollie Myers at Miles College, and after graduation, Myers proposed that they both apply to graduate school at the University of Alabama, which had never accepted a black student. Lucy initially thought Myers was joking, but decided to commit to the plan when Lucy realized Myers was serious. Myers was a civil rights activist with the NAACP at the time.

=== Suing the university ===
In September 1952, the pair applied to the University of Alabama. Lucy later said that she wanted a second undergraduate degree, not for political reasons but to get the best possible education in the state. Although the women were accepted, their admittance was rescinded when the authorities discovered they were not white. Backed by the NAACP, Lucy and Myers charged the university with racial discrimination in a court case that took almost three years to resolve. While waiting, Lucy worked as an English teacher in Carthage, Mississippi, and as a secretary at an insurance company.

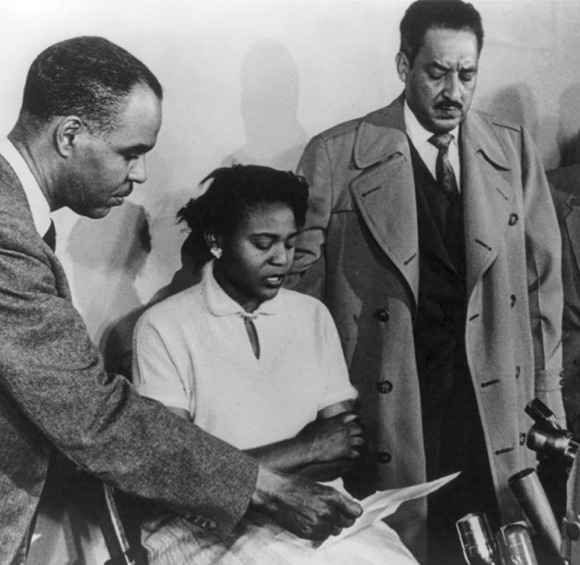
Autherine Lucy with Roy Wilkins and Thurgood Marshall of NAACP in 1955

In 1954, the landmark Supreme Court desegregation case, Brown v. Board of Education said that racial segregation in public schools was unconstitutional (illegal). This precedent made a federal court side with Lucy and Myers against the university. Lucy and Myers's attorneys from the NAACP included Constance Baker Motley, Arthur Shores and Thurgood Marshall, who had helped win Brown. On June 29, 1955, the NAACP secured a court order preventing the university from rejecting the admission applications of Lucy and Myers (who had married and was then known as Pollie Myers Hudson) based upon their race. Days later, the court amended the order to apply to all other African-American students seeking admission to the University of Alabama.

The university hired private investigators to find reasons to disqualify Lucy and Myers: it was able to reject Myers on the grounds that a child she had conceived before marriage made her an unsuitable student, but couldn't find a reason to reject Lucy. At least two sources have said that the board hoped that without Myers, the more outgoing and assured of the pair and whose idea it originally was to enroll at Alabama, Lucy's own acceptance would mean little or nothing to her, and she would voluntarily decide not to attend. But Myers and others strongly encouraged her, and on February 3, 1956, Lucy enrolled as a graduate student in library science, becoming the first Black American ever admitted to a white public school or university in the state. Even though Lucy was officially admitted, she was still barred from all dormitories and dining halls.

=== Attending the university ===
Lucy attended her first class on Friday, February 3, 1956. The Ku Klux Klan began burning crosses nightly on the university campus. On Monday, February 6, 1956, riots broke out on the campus and a mob of more than a thousand men yelled and pelted the car in which the dean of women drove Lucy between classes. Threats were made against her life and the university president's home was stoned. At the Education Library building, Lucy locked herself in a room and prayed for strength, fearing the mob would kill her. The police were called and she slipped away in a patrol car when the mob was distracted by someone else who was supposed to pick her up. These riots at the university remain, to date, the most violent, post-Brown, anti-integration demonstration. After the riots, the university suspended Lucy from school, using the excuse that this was necessary for the safety of Lucy and other students. The riot made global news, with the popular sentiment believing that the local police had allowed the mob to get so violent.

Martin Luther King Jr. wrote a sermon in 1956 about the events and gave it at the Dexter Avenue Baptist Church the day before his trial for violating Alabama’s anti-boycott law:

As soon as Autherine Lucy walked on the campus, a group of spoiled students lead [sic] by Leonard Wilson and a vicious group of criminals began threatening her on every hand. Crosses were burned. Eggs and bricks were thrown at her. The mob even jumped on top of the car in which she was riding. Finally the president and trustees of the university of Alabama asked Autherine to leave for her own safety and the safety of the university. The next day after Autherine was dismissed the paper came out with this headline: 'Things are quiet in Tuscaloosa today. There is peace on the campus of the university of Alabama.' Yes things were quiet in Tuscaloosa. yes there was peace on the campus, but it was peace at a great price. It was peace that had been purchased at the exorbitant price of an inept trustee board succoming [sic] to the whims and carprices [sic] of a vicious mob. It was peace that had been purchased at the price of allowing mobocracy to reign supreme over democracy.

=== Complaints and aftermath ===
Lucy and her lawyers from the NAACP filed contempt-of-court charges against the trustees and president of the university; against the dean of women for barring her from the dining hall and dormitories, and against four other men (none connected to the university) for participating in the riots. On February 29, the Federal Court in Birmingham ordered that Lucy be reinstated and that the university must take adequate measures to protect her. The university trustees expelled her permanently on a hastily contrived technicality the same day. The university used the court case as a justification, claiming that Lucy had slandered the university and they could not have her as a student. The NAACP, feeling that further legal action was pointless, did not contest this decision, and Lucy stopped attempting to rejoin the university.

While Lucy felt defeated from being expelled and losing the court case, Marshall, who would become the first Black American Supreme Court justice in 1967, thought differently. In a letter to Lucy, he said, "Whatever happens in the future, remember for all concerned, that your contribution has been made toward equal justice for all Americans and that you have done everything in your power to bring this about."

University President Oliver Carmichael resigned as a result of the trustees' opposition to Lucy's admission.

== Later life and death ==
After Lucy was expelled from the university, Marshall was so concerned about her safety that he brought her to New York to stay in his home with him and his wife, Cecilia. Lucy said later, "I just felt so secure with Mr. Marshall and his wife... How grateful I have been over all these years for the protection and the kindness he gave to me."

In April 1956, in Dallas, Lucy married Hugh Foster, a divinity student (and later a minister) whom she had met at Miles College.

For the next seventeen years, Lucy and her family lived in various cities in Louisiana, Mississippi, and Texas. Her notoriety made it difficult at first for her to find employment as a teacher. The Fosters moved back to Alabama in 1974, and Lucy obtained a position in the Birmingham school system. Lucy remained a civil rights advocate for some time, making speeches at NAACP meetings around the country.

In April 1988, Lucy's expulsion was officially annulled by the University of Alabama. She enrolled in the graduate program in Education the following year and received an M.A. degree in May 1992, receiving a standing ovation at graduation. Her daughter Grazia graduated from the University of Alabama with a bachelor's degree the same year. The university named an endowed fellowship in her honor and unveiled a portrait of her in the student union. The inscription reads "Her initiative and courage won the right for students of all races to attend the University. She is a sister of Zeta Phi Beta Sorority, Inc."

Late in life, Lucy stated that she still resented the way the university had previously treated her, but "you just refuse to spend time thinking about it."

Lucy died on March 2, 2022, at the age of 92. Her grandniece, Nikema Williams, is a member of the United States House of Representatives and chair of the Democratic Party of Georgia.

== Legacy ==
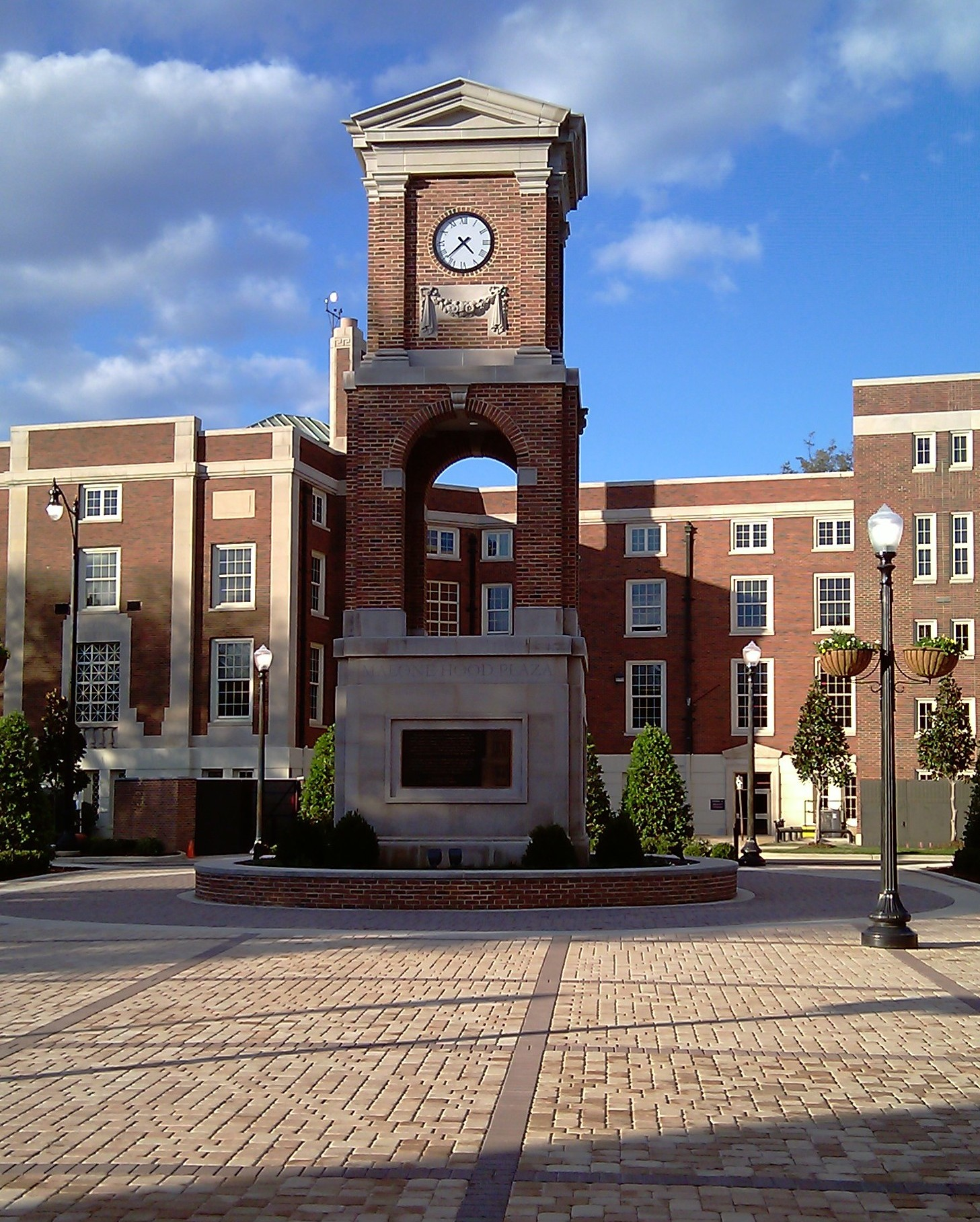
Autherine Lucy Clock Tower

In 2003, when Vivian Malone, the first black graduate of the University of Alabama, spoke about the university's desegregation, she honored Lucy as an inspiration for her own desegregation work. Malone stated: “I was a child when that happened, but her efforts had an indelible impression on me...I figured if she could do it, I could do it.”

On November 3, 2010, the Autherine Lucy Clock Tower was dedicated in a new space honoring her, Vivian Malone, and James Hood (the Malone-Hood Plaza)—three individuals who pioneered desegregation at the University of Alabama. The Plaza is located beside Foster Auditorium, where, in 1963, Alabama Governor George Wallace unsuccessfully attempted to bar Malone and Hood from registering at the university. The 40-foot-tall (12 m) brick tower has a base displaying bronze plaques that chronicle the individual struggles of Lucy, Malone, and Hood. Additionally, on September 15, 2017, a special marker was erected in her honor near Graves Hall (home of the College of Education) on the UA campus. Lucy returned to speak at the ceremony and compared the crowd that welcomed her with the hatred she had encountered the first time she entered the university.

In May 2019, Lucy attended the University of Alabama's spring graduation, where the school presented her with an honorary doctorate. They described her as "the architect of desegregating Alabama's education systems."

Lucy's legacy continues at the University of Alabama with a $25,000 scholarship named after her and a picture of Lucy was put up at the university in 1992. On February 3, 2022, the university added Lucy's name to what was formerly Bibb Graves Hall, then changed to Lucy-Graves Hall. Following an outcry from students, faculty and the public about Lucy's name being placed alongside that of a former Klansman, UA trustees dropped Graves's name completely from the hall on February 11, 2022, renaming the building Autherine Lucy Hall.

== See also ==
- List of African-American pioneers in desegregation of higher education
- Timeline of the civil rights movement
