= Romulus, Alabama =

- Unincorporated community
- Location within Alabama Location within the United States
- Coordinates: 33°08′51″N 87°45′07″W
- Country: United States
- State: Alabama
- County: Tuscaloosa
- Elevation: 318 ft (97 m)
- Time zone: UTC-6 (Central (CST))
  - Summer (DST): UTC-5 (CDT)
- Area codes: 205, 659
- GNIS feature ID: 156993

Romulus is an unincorporated community in Tuscaloosa County, Alabama, United States.

== History ==
Romulus is most likely named for Romulus, one of the main characters in ancient Rome's foundation myth. A post office operated under the name Romulus from 1835 to 1913.

During the American Civil War, Romulus was the site of a skirmish between Union forces under the command of Col. John T. Croxton and Confederate forces under the command of Brigadier-General William Wirt Adams. Croxton was leaving Northport after being dispatched from Brig-Gen. James H. Wilson's larger force after burning the University of Alabama on April 4, 1865. Adams was attempting to rendezvous with Lt. Gen. Nathan Bedford Forrest in Marion when he learned that Croxton was in the area. The 6th Kentucky Cavalry Regiment and the 2nd Michigan Volunteer Cavalry Regiment engaged with Adams' forces on April 6, 1865. Croxton lost 34 men and ambulance wagons and Adams forces lost an unrecorded number of men.
