= Our World (1986 TV program) =

American television news series

- Our World title card
- Created by: Roone Arledge
- Starring: Linda Ellerbee; Ray Gandolf
- Country of origin: United States
- No. of seasons: 1
- No. of episodes: 26

Production
- Producer: Avram "Av" Westin
- Running time: 60 min. (including commercials)

Original release
- Network: ABC
- Release: September 25, 1986 – May 28, 1987

Our World is an American television news program that aired on ABC for 26 episodes, from September 25, 1986, to May 28, 1987. The show was anchored by Linda Ellerbee and Ray Gandolf. Each episode of the program examined, through the use of archival film and television footage, one short period in American history.

Our World grew out of an earlier ABC News special called 45/85, whose producer, Avram Westin, would go on to produce Our World. Each episode was produced on a budget of $350,000, less than half of the budget of a typical hour of prime time programming at the time.

Our World premiered to mixed reviews, but as the program progressed critical reception was more positive. Overall, the series was critically well received. The series was also profitable for the network. Despite this, Our World performed poorly in the Nielsen ratings, as its first half-hour was programmed against the extremely popular The Cosby Show. ABC canceled the show after one season. Ellerbee tried to move the program to PBS but was unsuccessful.

== Production ==
Our World was created by ABC News president Roone Arledge. The show had its genesis in a 1985 ABC News special called 45/85, a three-hour documentary that reviewed post-World War II history with an emphasis on the Cold War. That special was produced by Avram "Av" Westin, who also produced Our World. Anchors Ellerbee and Gandolf co-wrote Our World, which combined archival footage with new interviews with people who participated in or witnessed the events. Initial plans were that each episode would cover one year, but that idea was quickly scrapped; Ellerbee said, "It's hard enough to do a month, or even days."

Ellerbee and Gandolf anchor an episode surrounded by artifacts of the profiled era.

ABC hired Ellerbee away from NBC to co-anchor the show. The network considered Sander Vanocur, Dick Schaap and James Wooten as possible partners before selecting Gandolf, at the time the sports anchor for ABC's World News Saturday and World News Sunday.

Set designers modeled the set for Our World after a corner news stand. For each episode, artifacts of the period being profiled, including magazines and political posters, decorated the set and a movie marquee listed the title of a film that was in theatres of the time. In the foreground was placed an Our World newspaper the headlines of which were the program's title and the name of that program's producer.

Each episode cost $350,000 to produce as compared to the then-typical $800,000 cost of an hour of prime time network programming. The low budget combined with a dozen commercial spots sold at $35,000 each meant that Our World generated an estimated $4 million in profit for ABC during its original run and summer repeats.

Our World producers selected each episode's subject time period with the help of consultants from the Smithsonian Institution and Columbia University. The show was limited in its choices by the available footage for the given time period. Ellerbee recalled a viewer-submitted proposal for an episode on the American Civil War, which could not be made because of the non-existence of archive footage from the 1860s and the lack of any living eyewitnesses.

== Episode list ==
Reruns occasionally occurred in between new episodes.

Title	U.S. air date	Selected topics
Summer of 1969	September 25, 1986	Woodstock; Manson Family murders; Apollo 11; The Smothers Brothers; Arlo Guthrie; Diahann Carroll.
13 Days In October 1962	October 2, 1986	The Cuban Missile Crisis; The Seattle World's Fair.
Autumn 1956	October 16, 1986	The Suez Crisis; Adlai Stevenson's presidential campaign; The Ten Commandments.
Forty Days of Spring 1970	October 23, 1986	Invasion of Cambodia; Kent State shootings; Student Strike; Apollo 13; COINTELPRO; release of the films M*A*S*H and Patton; development of the first microprocessors.
Halloween 1938	October 30, 1986	The War of the Worlds radio broadcast and panic; Adolf Hitler; Snow White and the Seven Dwarfs.
Breaking Barriers 1954	November 6, 1986	Jonas Salk and his polio vaccine; The Army-McCarthy Hearings; The first hydrogen bomb; Brown v. Board of Education.
Together And Apart 1943	December 4, 1986	The home front; The Detroit race riot of 1943.
Pursuit Of Power; Autumn 1973	December 11, 1986	The Yom Kippur War; The OPEC oil embargo; Women's rights movement; The Riggs-King tennis match.
All Shook Up; Autumn 1957	December 18, 1986	School desegregation in Little Rock, Arkansas; Sputnik; American Bandstand; Althea Gibson wins Wimbledon and the US Open; West Side Story.
Secrets & Surprises: Fall 1948	January 1, 1987	The Berlin Airlift; The 1948 presidential election; LP albums.
Inner Struggles; Autumn 1975	January 8, 1987	Patty Hearst; assassination attempts on Gerald Ford by Lynette "Squeaky" Fromme and Sarah Jane Moore; Ali/Frazier III; Disco.
Fear And Frustration; Winter 1952	January 15, 1987	The election of Dwight D. Eisenhower; the Red Scare; the McCarran-Walter Act.
Summer 1939	January 22, 1987	The New York World's Fair; The Wizard of Oz and Gone With the Wind; "God Bless America".
Winds Of Change; Winter 1968	February 5, 1987	The Tet Offensive; The 1968 Winter Olympics; Lyndon B. Johnson decides not to seek re-election; The 1968 presidential primaries.
A Crowded Room; Fall 1949	February 12, 1987	Levittown, New York; Early television; Soviet nuclear weapons.
Gone With The Wind 1939	February 19, 1987	Gone With The Wind.
Between The Lines; Summer 1972	February 26, 1987	The Watergate scandal; The continuing Vietnam War; The Munich massacre.
Up Against The Wall; Summer 1961	March 5, 1987	The Berlin Wall; Mickey Mantle's and Roger Maris' pursuit of Babe Ruth's home run record; the Baby Boom; Newton Minow's Wasteland Speech; the Freedom Rides; folk music.
Liberation; Summer 1944	April 9, 1987	War correspondents; The Liberation of Paris; Women in wartime.
Cover Stories; Spring 1960	April 16, 1987	Francis Gary Powers; Student protests at Berkeley; Elvis Presley leaves the Army.
Period of Adjustment; Autumn 1946	April 23, 1987	Soldiers return home from Europe following World War II; the G.I. Bill; sweeping Republican victories in both the House and Senate.
Speaking Out; Summer 1963	April 30, 1987	John F. Kennedy's Ich bin ein Berliner speech in West Berlin; Kennedy vs. George Wallace over desegregating the University of Alabama.
Duels In The Sun: Campaign '52	May 7, 1987	The Soviet Union competes at its first Olympics.
One Day: April 12, 1961	May 14, 1987	April 12, 1961; Yuri Gagarin orbits the Earth.
Long Winter, Short Spring 1937	May 21, 1987	The Great Depression; the Flint Sit-Down Strike against General Motors; Swing music.
Dangerous Assumptions: Spring 1953	May 28, 1987	The execution of Julius and Ethel Rosenberg; Edmund Hillary and Tenzig Norgay climb Mount Everest: the Academy Awards are broadcast on television for the first time.

== Reception ==
=== Critical response ===
Critical reception to Our World was overall very favorable.

==== First episode ====
Reviews of the first episode were mixed.

The New York Times said "There are worse ways to spend an hour" and calling the show "a pleasant hour", while pointing to segments such as an interview with "a man, who, 17 years ago, slept in the house next door to a house struck by the Manson gang", as "not terribly interesting." The Los Angeles Times was similarly unfavorable, calling the debut "rather bland" and, while praising anchors Ellerbee and Gandolf (and calling them "refreshing [and] off-center, running against the TV mainstream, making words, not whoopee"), it ultimately felt that "Our World offers no sense of who we really were in 1969 because, typical of TV, it renders everything equal."

==== Later reviews ====
With subsequent episodes, reviews improved. The Boston Globe, comparing its debut episode ("a gloppy nostalgia trip that presented history the way MTV presents rock, in digestible, unrelated, bland bite-sized bits") to an episode airing less than five months later, found it "light years ahead in terms of wit, style and historical perspective. It is still easily digestible, but there's nothing bland about it." The St. Petersburg Times said of the show, "It educated, but it was not school. It entertained, but it was not mindless. It was quality - television's noblest service." The San Diego Union concurred, citing Our World as "the most refreshing, fascinating and innovative history series ever on TV".

=== Popularity ===
Popularity was much less effusive. The show averaged 9 million viewers per episode, as compared to The Cosby Show, which garnered an average 63 million viewers per week. Our World was the lowest rated prime time show of the 104 that aired during the 1986-7 television season, bringing in only a 6.5/10 rating/share. One segment of the public who responded very favorably to the program was teachers, who assigned Our World as homework. ABC created a study guide for the show, mailing out some 39,000 copies a month to educators and fans.

Gandolf, Ellerbee and Richard Gerdau won Emmy Awards for Outstanding Individual Achievement in News and Documentary Programming (writing) for the episode "Halloween 1938".

== Cancellation and PBS ==
ABC canceled Our World after its first season, replacing it with the situation comedies Sledge Hammer! and The Charmings. Ellerbee and Gandolf learned that the show had been canceled from a segment on Entertainment Tonight. Ellerbee sharply criticized ABC for the cancellation, saying "If they had left it there for three to four years, it could have done what 60 Minutes did, which went against the Disney juggernaut on NBC. It could have developed slowly as an alternative program without being in the ratings race." The advocacy group Viewers for Quality Television mounted a letter-writing campaign to save the show – similar to campaigns that had saved Designing Women and Cagney and Lacey – and generated some 20,000 letters of support, but the campaign was unsuccessful.

PBS expressed interest in obtaining the show. Although ABC asserted rights to the name Our World, Ellerbee said "We never liked that title to begin with" and stated that the name Your World was under consideration. Ellerbee planned to co-produce the show through her production company, Lucky Duck Productions, in partnership with WNET. Ultimately, Ellerbee was unable to secure the estimated $5 million needed to produce the first season of 13 episodes and Our World did not make the transition to PBS.

In 1988, CBS tried to revive the format of Our World with a television pilot called Try to Remember. Anchored by veteran newscaster Charles Kuralt, Try to Remember covered August 11–17, 1969, echoing Our World's pilot coverage of the summer of 1969. The show aired on Thursday, June 23. Try to Remember did not get picked up as a regular program.
