= Report to the American People on Civil Rights =

1963 civil rights speech by John F. Kennedy

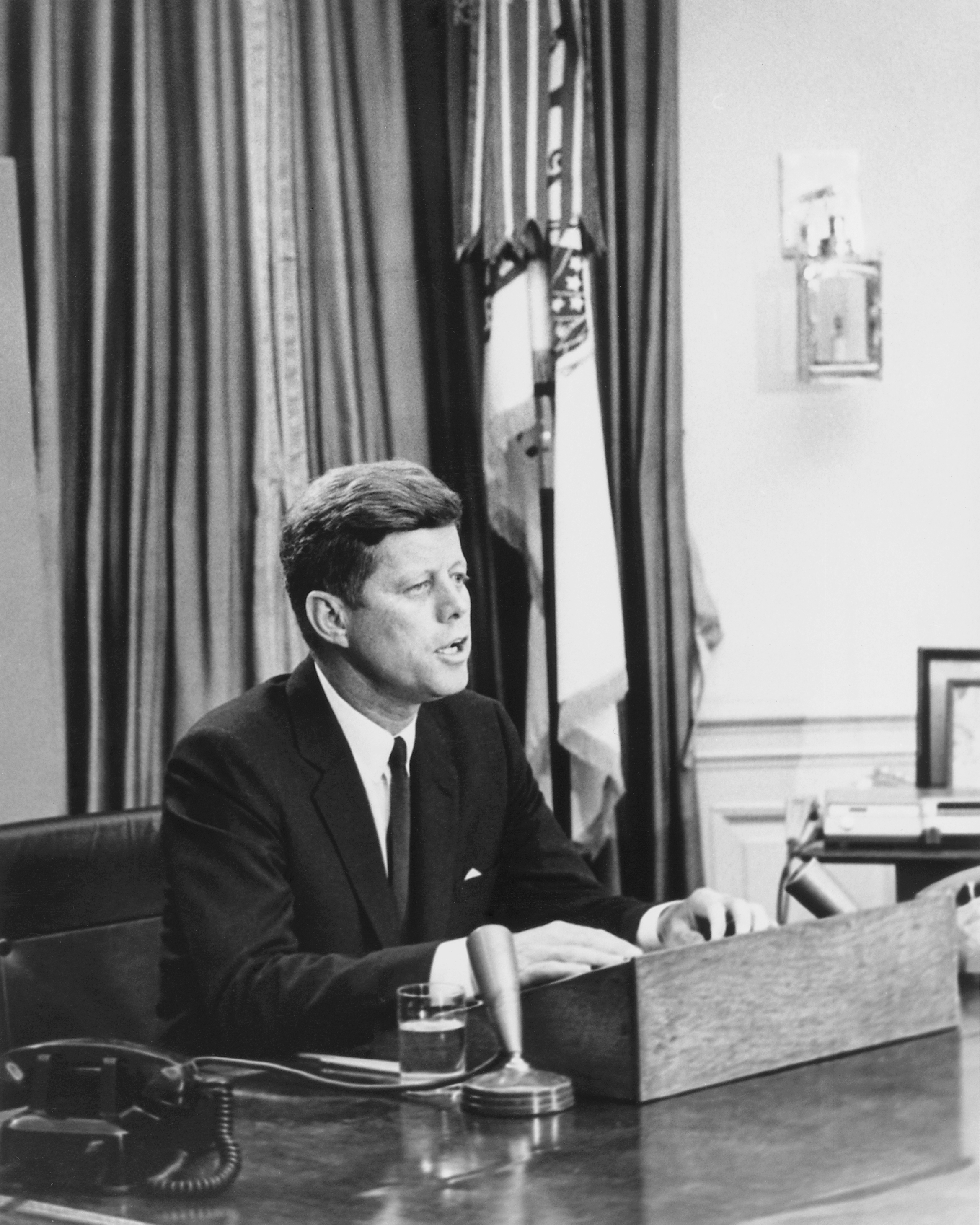
- President Kennedy delivering his speech while sitting at the Resolute desk in the Oval Office
- Date: June 11, 1963; 63 years ago
- Time: 8:00–8:13 PM EDT
- Duration: 13:24
- Venue: Oval Office, White House
- Location: Washington, D.C., United States; 38°53′52″N 77°02′11″W
- Theme: Civil rights
- Website: Report to the American People on Civil Rights, 11 June 1963

The Report to the American People on Civil Rights was a speech on civil rights, delivered on radio and television by United States President John F. Kennedy from the Oval Office on June 11, 1963, in which he proposed legislation that would later become the Civil Rights Act of 1964. Expressing civil rights as a moral issue, Kennedy moved past his previous appeals to legality and asserted that the pursuit of racial equality was a just cause. The address signified a shift in his administration's policy towards strong support of the civil rights movement and played a significant role in shaping his legacy as a proponent of civil rights.

Kennedy was initially cautious in his support of civil rights and desegregation in the United States. Concerned that dramatic actions would alienate legislators in the segregated southern United States, he limited his activities on the issue and confined his justifying rhetoric to legal arguments. As his term continued, African Americans became increasingly impatient with their lack of social progress and racial tensions escalated. The rising militancy of the civil rights movement troubled white Americans and the deteriorating situation reflected negatively on the United States abroad. Kennedy came to conclude that he had to offer stronger support for civil rights, including the enactment of new legislation that would ensure desegregation in the commercial sector.

On June 11, 1963, federal officials integrated the University of Alabama. Kennedy decided that it was an opportune moment to speak about civil rights, and instructed Ted Sorensen to draft a speech that he could deliver on television that evening. Attorney General Robert F. Kennedy and his deputy, Burke Marshall, assisted Sorensen, who finished shortly before President Kennedy was due to begin speaking at 8:00 PM.

== Background ==
From the onset of his term, President John F. Kennedy was relatively silent on the issue of African-American civil rights in the United States, preferring executive action to legislative solutions. He was cautious not to distance the South, marked by substantial segregation and racial discrimination, by infringing upon states' rights. He also wanted to avoid upsetting members of Congress, as he was already struggling to secure their support for most of his New Frontier domestic programs. However, Kennedy's position on civil rights had begun to evolve during the Freedom Rides of 1961, when African Americans traveled along segregated bus routes in the South. Though he dispatched federal marshals to guard against the racial violence of the events, he publicly stressed that his actions were rooted in legality and not morality; American citizens had a constitutional right to travel, and he was simply enforcing that right. Regardless, several activists encouraged the President to discuss the "moral issue" of civil rights in American society. According to aide Harris Wofford, Kennedy felt that he was the strongest supporter of civil rights who had ever held the presidency, and he was irritated by such appeals. Wofford advised him, "What [President Dwight D. Eisenhower] never did was to give clear moral expression to the issues involved. The only effective time for such moral leadership is during an occasion of moral crisis. This is the time when your words mean most. Negro leaders feel sorely the absence of any such statement."

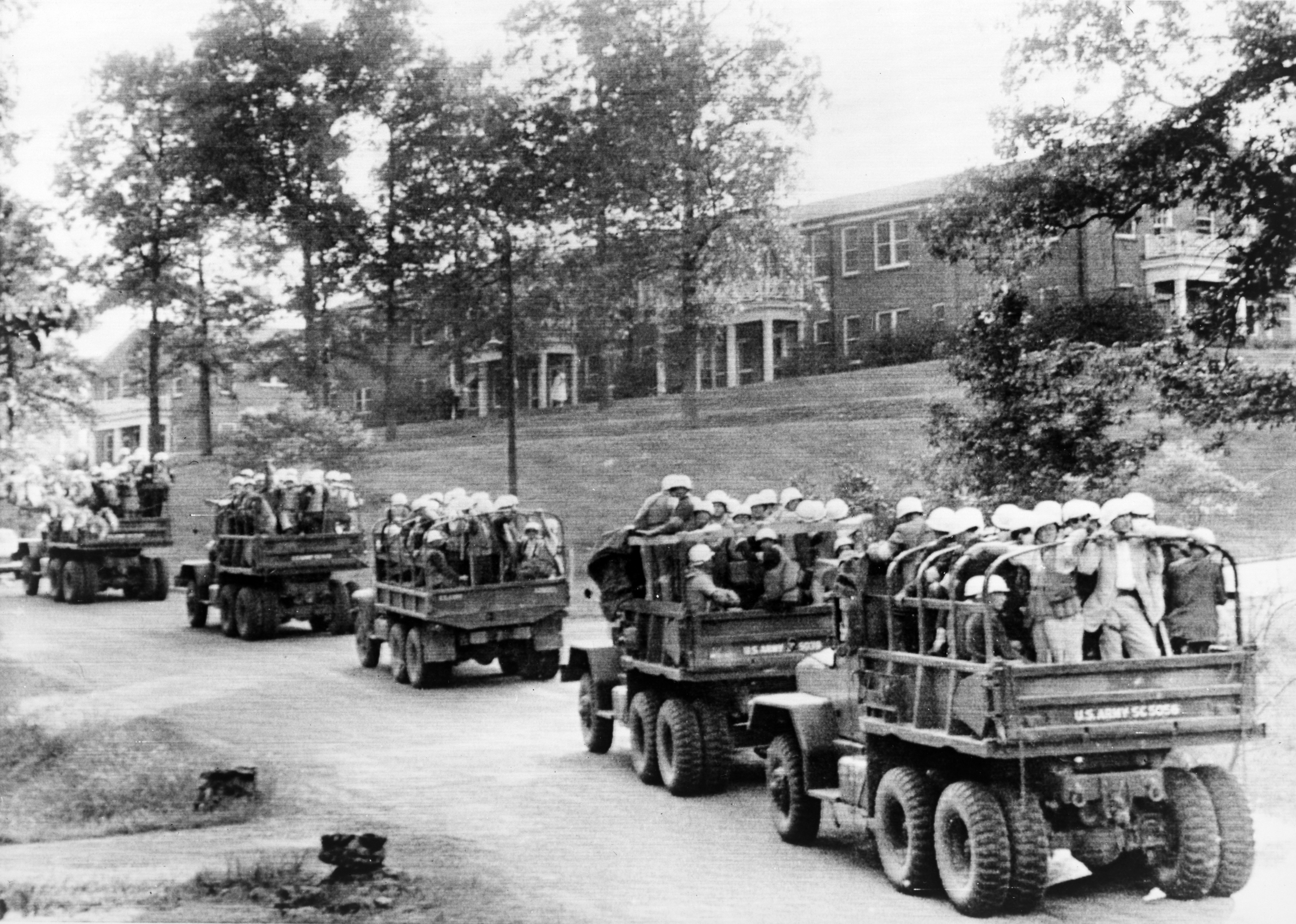
Federal agents being transported to the University of Mississippi in military vehicles to maintain order

Kennedy devoted a significant amount of his 1962 State of the Union Address to the topic of civil rights, but he confined his rhetoric to legal themes and conveyed that present legislation sufficed his administration's efforts to combat racial discrimination. In September, James Meredith, a black man, enrolled at the University of Mississippi. Although Kennedy used federal troops to guarantee Meredith's safety and attendance, he publicly downplayed the violence that had occurred and made no changes to his legislative agenda. Despite being pleased that the federal government had protected Meredith, civil rights leader Martin Luther King Jr. was reportedly "deeply disappointed" in the President. Following the failure of the Albany Movement later that year, many civil rights activists believed that Kennedy "was more concerned with quieting the civil rights movement down than removing the practices it opposed."

In 1963, an increasing number of white Americans, troubled by the rise of more militant black leaders like Malcolm X, feared that the civil rights movement would take a violent turn. The depiction of racial violence in the media also benefited the Soviet Union's Cold War propaganda and damaged the United States' image abroad, which greatly concerned Kennedy. He determined that appropriate legislation would enable the administration to pursue suits through the court system and get the problem "out of the streets" and away from international spectators. In February, after receiving a report from the Civil Rights Commission on racial discrimination, Kennedy sent a message to Congress calling for a civil rights bill on the 28th. In addition to the suggested economic and diplomatic benefits, he justified his legislation's measures to remove institutional racism because "above all, [racism] is wrong." This marked the first time that Kennedy discussed civil rights in expressly moral terms. Regardless, the proposal garnered a flat response. Civil rights leaders were disappointed in the bill as it focused mainly on voting rights, and critics believed a bolder proposal was needed to end discrimination for African Americans. The Southern Christian Leadership Conference concluded that the Kennedy administration would need to be forced to fully confront racial problems. To do so, the Conference organized a series of demonstrations in April in Birmingham, Alabama, viewed by activists as one of the most segregated cities in the United States, which was designed to create a crisis that would require the President's involvement. The violent crackdown against demonstrators that occurred in May disturbed Kennedy, but he refrained from directly intervening because he did not believe he had a legal basis to do so. The civil conflict attracted global attention, especially from African leaders who were scheduled to assemble for a conference in Addis Ababa.

After the bombing of King's house on May 12, Kennedy delivered a short radio and television address and, in keeping with his previous legal arguments, he promised that his administration would "do whatever must be done to preserve order, to protect the lives of its citizens, and to uphold the law of the land." Meanwhile, Liberal Republicans in Congress proposed legislation that would outlaw segregationist practices. Nelson Rockefeller, a possible contender in the 1964 presidential election, suggested that he would try to raise money to bail King out of a Birmingham jail (King had been arrested for protesting). With such potential rivals threatening to take the initiative on civil rights, Kennedy became convinced that legislative action on the matter was a "political and moral necessity." His brother, Attorney General Robert F. Kennedy, was compelled by the events in Birmingham to support a legislative solution, though most of his other advisers remained unconvinced. On May 22, the President told the press that law "is not a matter of choice" and that "as a result of recent developments" he was "considering whether any additional proposals [would] be made to Congress ... We hope to see if we can develop a legal remedy". Nine days later he resolved over the objection of some of his advisers to propose a new civil rights bill being crafted by the Department of Justice, though the details of the legislation had yet to be finalized.

== Prelude ==
On May 21, 1963, a federal district judge ruled that the University of Alabama had to allow two black students, James Hood and Vivian Malone, to be admitted for its summer courses, starting in June. Alabama Governor George Wallace was determined to make at least a public display of opposing the order.

As the ensuing standoff intensified, Kennedy debated with his staff over the value of giving a speech on the matter. (Note: Kennedy spoke in favor of civil rights in broad terms on June 6 at San Diego State University and on June 9 at the United States Conference of Mayors but his remarks garnered little public attention.) He himself was unsure of the idea, and his senior advisers were opposed to it except his brother, who supported the proposition. In a telephone conversation with presidential speechwriter Ted Sorensen on June 3, Vice President Lyndon B. Johnson insisted that civil rights leaders wanted "moral commitment, and that will do more to satisfy them than [legislation]. [Kennedy] should stick to the moral issue and he should do it without equivocation ... what the Negroes are really seeking is moral force." He also suggested that the President should appear on television with an interracial military honor guard and argue that if there was an equal expectation for military service in the United States, then United States citizens should be treated equally in their country. In anticipation that the President might go forward with a response, the Attorney General had directed his recently hired speechwriter, Richard Yates, to produce a draft. Yates began writing on the evening of June 9. Hours after giving his American University speech on the previous day, President Kennedy met with Sorensen, Kenneth O'Donnell, Larry O'Brien, and Robert Kennedy in the White House to discuss the issue. The latter said, "Well, we've got a draft which doesn't fit all these points, but it's something to work with, and there's some pretty good sentences and paragraphs." The President then concluded the meeting, saying, "It will help us get ready anyway, because we may want to do it tomorrow." Meanwhile, King participated in a television interview which was to be printed on the front page of The New York Times the following morning. Comparing Kennedy's civil rights policy to Eisenhower's, King said that the President had substituted "an inadequate approach for a miserable one" and admonished him to discuss the moral dimensions of United States' racial problems.

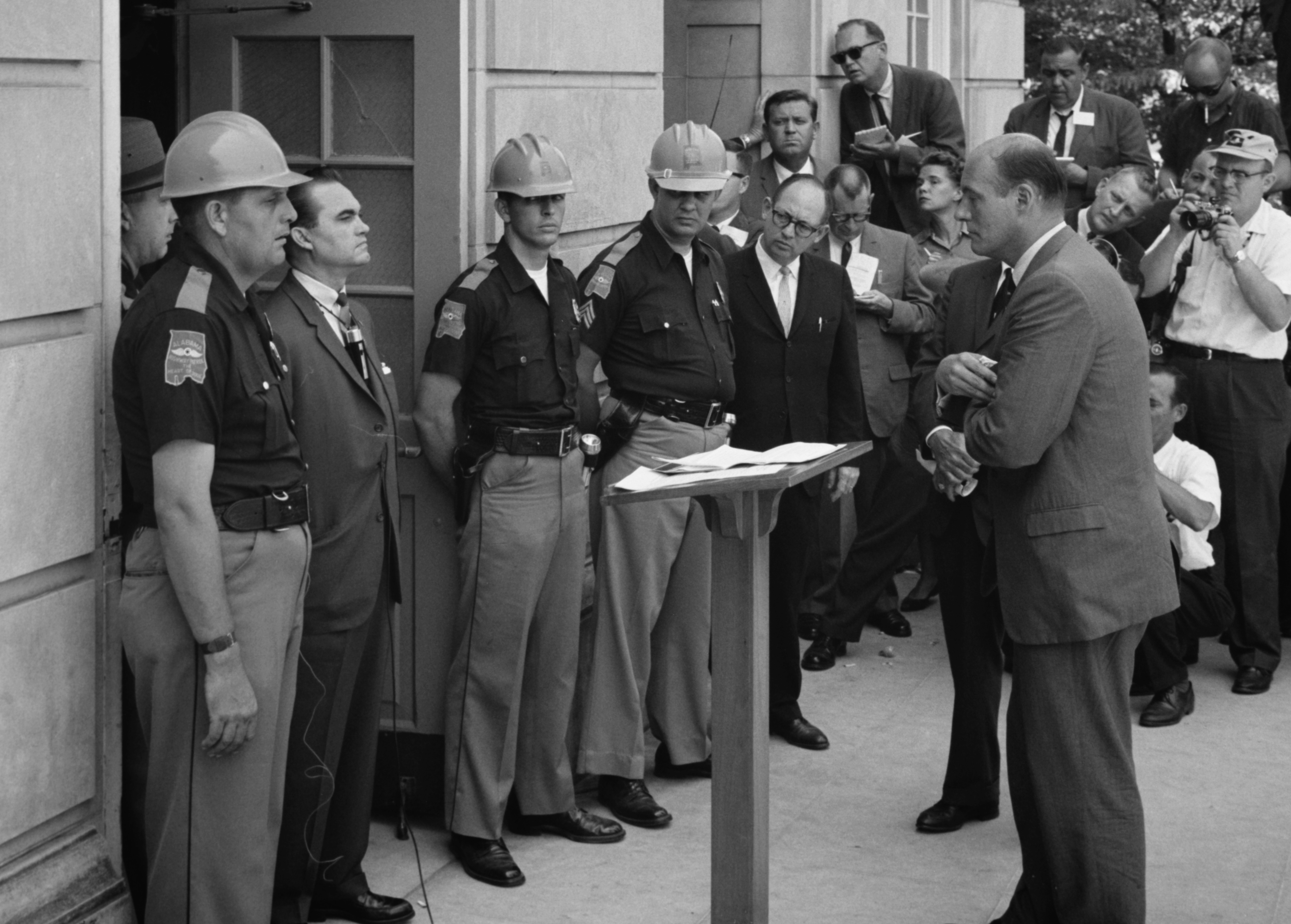
Governor George Wallace (left) facing off with Deputy Attorney General Nicholas Katzenbach (right) at the University of Alabama

On June 11, Governor Wallace stood in the doorway of Foster Auditorium at the University of Alabama to prevent the black students from registering for classes. Shortly after noon, Kennedy, unsure of what Wallace would do, requested for the Big Three television networks (ABC, CBS, NBC) to clear time to broadcast a statement at 8:00 p.m. White House Press Secretary Pierre Salinger fulfilled the task, in the process alerting the two largest national wire services, the Associated Press and United Press International. Less than three hours after the standoff began, Wallace yielded to Deputy Attorney General Nicholas Katzenbach and National Guard General Henry V. Graham. Kennedy and his staff watched the situation resolve on television in the White House afterwards. Sorensen figured that with the confrontation over, no speech would be given. However, Kennedy thought that the moment was opportune to educate the public on civil rights and follow through with appropriate legislation. Turning his chair towards Sorensen, Kennedy said, "We better give that civil rights speech tonight." That was over the objection of O'Brien, who thought that a speech would galvanize southern opposition and stall Kennedy's legislative agenda. Deputy Attorney General Burke Marshall said of Robert Kennedy's influence on the decision, "He urged it, he felt it, he understood it, and he prevailed. I don't think there was anybody in the Cabinet—except the President himself—who felt that way on these issues, and the President got it from his brother." Historian Carl Brauer argued that the most important factor in Kennedy's choice was his own perception of his reputation and goal to be viewed as a decisive leader, which had been compromised by the events in Birmingham.

With only approximately two hours until the broadcast at 8:00 p.m., (Note: Cohen determines that Kennedy must have watched a delayed broadcast of the standoff in Alabama and instructed Sorensen to prepare remarks only sometime after 5:40 p.m.) no work had been done on a speech. (Note: Yates was finished with his draft by the morning of June 11, producing critical remarks that were "short, eloquent, and stark". In their 1964 oral history, Robert Kennedy and his deputy, Burke Marshall, maintained that it was "unsatisfactory." Sorensen, who said that up to his instruction from the President, no speech had been written, apparently never saw it. Even if he had, it made little difference; none of Yates' work was used. Figuring that his own work was too bleak for the President's use, Yates still expected that excerpts of it would be employed and was disappointed to find otherwise when he viewed the address on television.) After consulting the President on what he wanted to say, Sorensen and several others, including recently arrived Robert Kennedy and Marshall (the President had called his brother to inform him of his decision to deliver a speech), withdrew to the Cabinet Room to work on a draft. Sorensen was anxious about the deadline he had to meet, but Robert Kennedy assured him, "Don't worry. We have a lot of good material over at the Justice Department that we can send to you."

At around 7:00 p.m., President Kennedy checked on the group's progress. Sorensen had managed to create two drafts, one incomplete, and was still revising them. Kennedy remarked, "C'mon Burke, you must have some ideas." He also altered part of the text, mindful not to provoke Southerners, changing Sorensen's "A social revolution is at hand" and "But the pace is still shamefully slow" to "A great change is at hand" and "But the pace is very slow," respectively. According to James Hood, the President called him at some point during the drafting process to ask for his opinion on an excerpt of the speech or his thoughts on how it would be received. (Note: Hollars expressed doubts about Hood's recollection, writing, "[T]he timelines don't sync up. Kennedy may have called Hood to ask permission to publicly praise the student, though given the speech's last minute edits, it would have been all but impossible for Hood to have received the final version prior to the rest of the country.") At 7:40 p.m., the Kennedy brothers met in the Oval Office to outline an extemporaneous statement in case Sorensen was unable to finish a speech. The President wrote notes on an envelope and available scrap paper. Four minutes before 8:00 p.m., Sorensen entered the room and presented him with a draft. (Note: According to some accounts, Kennedy was brought pages of the speech as they were completed, receiving some as he was speaking, but that cannot be seen in the television broadcast.) Kennedy looked over the speech and dictated final changes to his secretary, Evelyn Lincoln, as did Sorensen with his own secretary, who both then attempted to type up finished pieces. They were not completed before the deadline. Kennedy told Sorensen later that evening, "For the first time, I thought I was going to have to go off the cuff." Robert Kennedy suggested that his brother still improvise parts of the speech, later saying, "I think that probably, if he had given it [entirely] extemporaneously, it would have been as good or better."

== Content ==
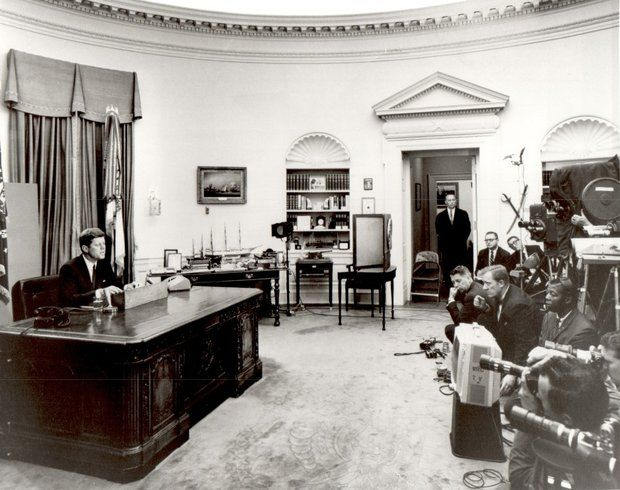
John F. Kennedy delivering his speech before television cameras

Kennedy read the prepared portion of his speech from pages placed in a shallow lectern on his desk. An American flag stood in the background behind him. He spoke for 13 minutes and 24 seconds. Associate Press Secretary Andrew Hatcher oversaw the broadcast in the Oval Office.

Kennedy began by briefly reviewing the integration of the University of Alabama, the event that provided him his reason for delivering the speech. He stated that he ordered the National Guard to the college "to carry out the final and unequivocal order of the United States District Court of the Northern District of Alabama." He utilized the word "Alabama" four times in his opening to emphasize that the matter was a state problem resolved by the federal government only at the behest of internal state elements. He also commended the student body of the university for behaving "peacefully" throughout the event, in contrast to the students who resisted the integration of the University of Mississippi. He then connected his message with "existing decision" by associating it with established American principles:

This nation was founded by men of many nations and backgrounds. It was founded on the principle that all men are created equal and that the rights of every man are diminished when the rights of one man are threatened.

From there, Kennedy took on a global perspective; he mentioned that the United States military recruited nonwhites to serve abroad and added that for their equal expectation to serve they were entitled to equal treatment within the country. He surmised, "We preach freedom around the world, and we mean it ... but are we to say to the world, and, much more importantly to each other, that this is the land of the free except for the Negroes?"

Careful not to levy excessive fault upon the South, Kennedy continued, "This is not a sectional issue. Difficulties over segregation and discrimination exist in every city, in every State of the Union, producing in many cities a rising tide of discontent that threatens the public safety."

In his speech, Kennedy called Americans to recognize civil rights as a moral cause to which all people need to contribute and was "as clear as the American Constitution." He conveyed how the proposed legislation would lead the nation to end discrimination against African Americans. It would also provide equal treatment to all African Americans.

Kennedy read most of the speech verbatim (Note: Kennedy moderated some of Sorensen's language. For example, Sorensen's call for Congress "to act, boldly" and "to give the enforceable right to be served in facilities which are open to the public" became Kennedy's "to act" and "to give." The speechwriter later said that while the speech had been "toned down, its substance remained.") but he dropped Sorensen's ending and improvised the last eight paragraphs.

== Aftermath ==
Immediately following the address, Kennedy left the Oval Office and at 8:19 p.m., he sat down for dinner upstairs. Meanwhile, the White House was flooded by approximately 1000 responding telegrams, of which two thirds expressed appreciation. Most of the messages from the South were disapproving. Kennedy later had adviser Louis E. Martin read some of them to him. The Attorney General also received mail, much of it expressing anti-civil rights sentiments. The State Department issued copies of the speech to all American diplomatic posts with specific instructions from the President and Secretary of State Dean Rusk on how the material was to be shared with the international community.

Later that night, civil rights activist Medgar Evers, who had been listening to Kennedy's remarks on the radio, was assassinated as he returned to his home in Jackson, Mississippi, which immediately drew domestic attention away from the event. Like the address, however, the murder brought renewed emphasis to civil rights problems and contributed to a growing sense of national urgency to take action.

=== Reception ===
I think the speech that President Kennedy made was forceful. He was the first president to say that the question of civil rights was a moral issue. He reminded us what it was like to be black or white in the American South, in that speech. I listened to every word of that speech.

— Civil rights leader John Lewis

Martin Luther King Jr. watched the address with Walter E. Fauntroy in Atlanta. When it was over, he jumped up and declared, "Walter, can you believe that white man not only stepped up to the plate, he hit it over the fence!" He then sent a telegram to the White House: "I have just listened to your speech to the nation. It was one of the most eloquent[,] profound, and unequivocal pleas for justice and freedom of all men ever made by any President. You spoke passionately for moral issues involved in the integration struggle." King had been working with other black civil rights leaders to organize a "March on Washington for Jobs and Freedom" in August. They decided to reorient the focus of the demonstration to put pressure on Congress—and not Kennedy's administration—to take action. The executive director of the National Association for the Advancement of Colored People (NAACP), Roy Wilkins, stated that while Kennedy had done well in explaining the moral issue of discrimination, he had failed to address inequality in the workplace adequately. Wilkins later said, however, "This was the message I had waited to hear from him. I fell asleep that night feeling new confidence. For the first time in years, real change seemed to be at hand." Writer James Baldwin and other activists who had met with the Attorney General in May to encourage the Kennedy administration to be more supportive of civil rights received the address positively. Jackie Robinson, a prominent black Republican and skeptic of Kennedy, announced that he would vote to re-elect the President in 1964. The speech also moved Mildred Loving, a black woman married to a white man, to write Robert Kennedy to ask if the administration's legislative proposals would include protection for interracial couples. The Attorney General suggested for her to seek help from the American Civil Liberties Union, the organization that later brought the legal challenge to Virginia's anti-miscegenation law on Loving's behalf before the Supreme Court in the landmark 1967 case Loving v. Virginia. Other civil rights activists feared that Kennedy's speech was delivered too late to curb the increasing violence in their movement.

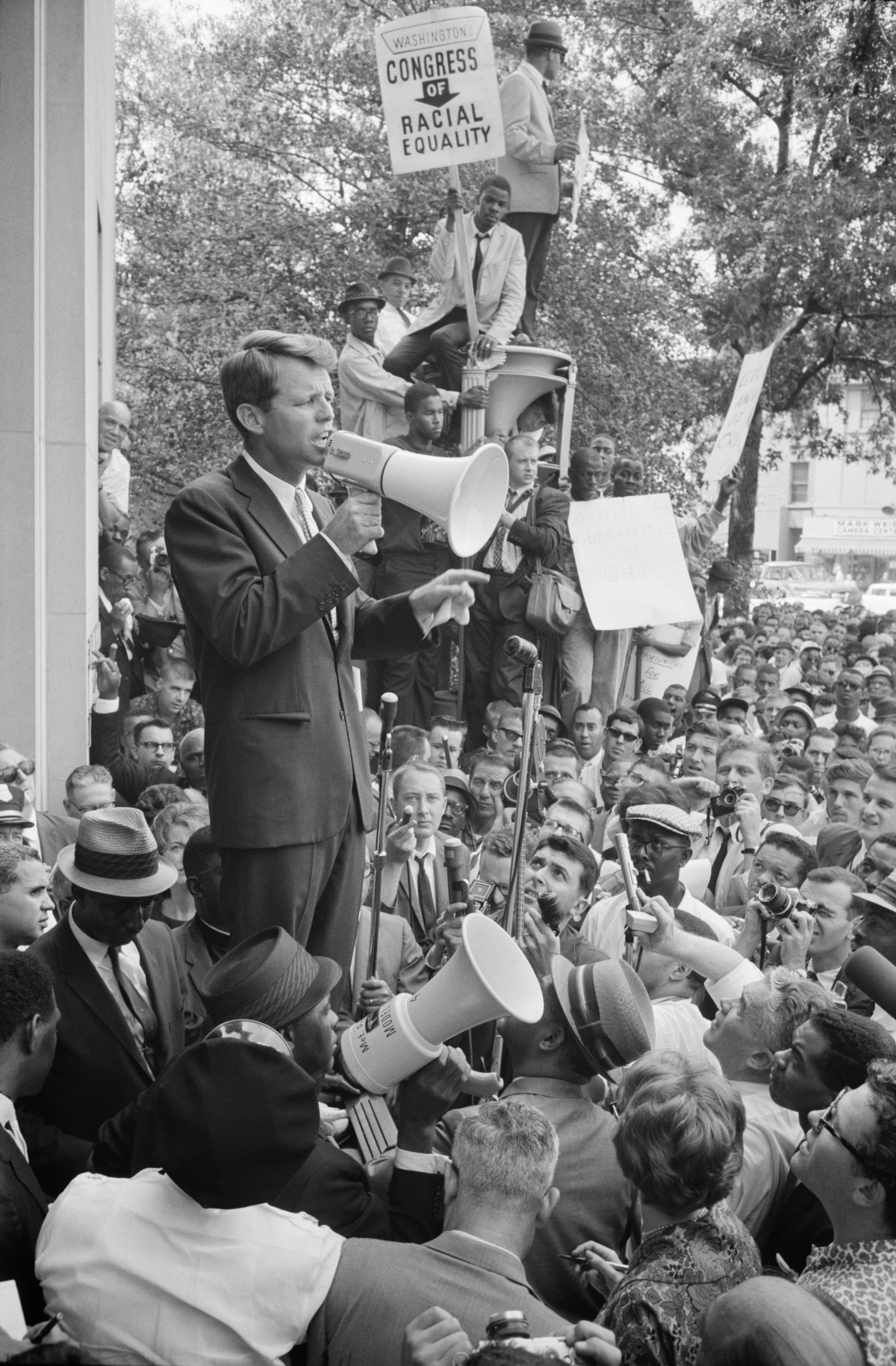
Robert Kennedy speaking to civil rights demonstrators in front of the Justice Department on June 14

The morning after the broadcast, a panel, moderated by Richard Heffner, discussed the content of the address on the Metromedia program The American Experience. Participants in the televised debate included Nation of Islam leader Malcolm X, New York editor of Ebony Allan Morrison, Congress of Racial Equality executive director James Farmer, and Southern Christian Leadership Conference executive director Wyatt Tee Walker. Several observers noted the historical significance of the speech; The Courier-Journal of Louisville, Kentucky wrote that it would "surely rank as one of the landmark public documents," and the St. Louis Post-Dispatch noted, "President Kennedy's moving appeal to the conscience of America should be regarded as one of the major achievements of the civil rights struggle." The New York Times published an editorial, which argued that while the President had initially "moved too slowly and with little evidence of deep moral commitment" in regards to civil rights, he "now demonstrate[d] a genuine sense of urgency about eradicating racial discrimination from our national life." The Nation remarked that Kennedy had "let two [genies] out of their respective bottles on successive days" (referencing the American University speech of June 10). A Newsweek writer described his actions as the "politics of courage." Favorable editorials were printed in The New Yorker, The New Republic, and Time. Other publications expressed timid approval of the address. The Wall Street Journal criticized Kennedy's approach, objecting to his harsh language that gave the impression that "90 percent of the American people are engaged in a bitter and unremitting oppression of the other 10 percent." It warned that the speech could tarnish the United States' image abroad, asking, "What is anyone to think when the nation's highest voice speaks of the conditions of Negroes as little more than slavery?" The Journal argued that Kennedy should have appealed for moderation and respect for law, maintaining, "The conditions are not so grievous that the whole nation must be worked into a frenzy which can aggravate tensions." A political cartoon was printed in the Hartford Courant, mocking the President's appeals to the public by showing him pointing his finger at an audience while declaring, "And I Do Mean You!"

International reaction to the address was very positive. United States Ambassador to Ethiopia Edward M. Korry wrote to the President that his speech had caused a "quick turnaround in attitudes" in the African state; Emperor Haile Selassie reportedly thought the remarks to be "masterpieces." Korry also sent Kennedy an editorial from the Ethiopian Herald which referred to him as "the Abraham Lincoln of the Democratic Party" and celebrated that the federal government "in the person of John F. Kennedy, has at long last come out in [defense] of the Constitution." The Soviet Union ignored the event and continued to attack American racism as the product of capitalism.

In the United States, Kennedy's approval rating among southern whites immediately dropped. In late May, he had the approval of 52% of southerners, but after the speech, he had only 33%. His ratings later made a partial recovery. The number of Americans who thought Kennedy was forcing integration "too fast" went from 36% in May to 48% in July. Republicans speculated that a northern white "backlash" would befall the President and condemn his proposal to failure. African-Americans' view of Kennedy shifted positively, with one September poll suggesting he would have 95% of the black vote in an election against conservative Senator Barry Goldwater and significantly more black electoral support than Rockefeller. However, satisfaction among the black community was not across the board; on June 14, 3,000 protesters gathered outside the Justice Department to demand the hiring of more black employees. This irritated the Attorney General, who felt that his brother was facing increased criticism for actions taken on his advice. He promised the crowd, "Individuals would be hired according to their ability, not their color" and reiterated the message of the President's speech, calling for an end to discrimination.

I got a call at two in the morning from Memphis, it was some men in a bar and they said they just wanted to let me know what they felt. 'We don't want to eat with [African Americans], we don't want to go to school with them, we don't even want to go to church with them.' I said, 'Do you want to go to heaven with them?' The guy answered, 'No, I'll just go to hell with you. ... '

— Part of Tennessee Senator Albert Gore Sr.'s statement to Kennedy after the speech

Reaction from Congress was mixed. Southern legislators despised the speech. Senator John Stennis, a staunch segregationist, vowed to resist Kennedy's proposals, declaring that they were "clearly unconstitutional and would open the door for police control of employment and personal associations in almost every field." Richard Russell Jr. claimed that passing such a bill would be the beginning of a transformation into "a socialistic or communist state." Senator Strom Thurmond suggested that Southern Democrats boycott Kennedy's legislative agenda in its entirety until he backed down on civil rights. Senator Allen Ellender argued that the President's propositions would "mean violence. He has all the laws on the statute books now if he wants use them, but he seems instead to want to follow the advice of Negro leaders and agitators." George Smathers, a longtime friend of Kennedy, said, "I could agree with almost everything the President said, but I don't really believe we need additional legislation. There are plenty of laws on the statute books, and the way the courts have been operating, there is no need of additional legislation to give the Negro his every right." Senator Albert Gore Sr. telephoned Kennedy to inform him that some of his constituents had called to voice their objections to integration. Other senators, especially Republicans Everett Dirksen and Thomas Kuchel were more receptive to Kennedy's ideas, the latter saying, "Neither caste nor creed have any part in our American system. If the President maintains vigorous leadership, all Americans and Congress will follow." Jacob Javits, a liberal member of Republican Party, expressed support for Kennedy's proposals but conveyed his disappointment that the move for new legislation had not been made earlier, saying, "Better late than never."

The day after the speech a motion in the House of Representatives to boost funding to the Area Redevelopment Administration as requested by Kennedy suffered a surprising defeat, 209–204, because of the opposition of Southern Democrats. Their rejection of the bill was widely viewed as a revolt against the President for his stance on civil rights. In discussing the failure with House Majority Leader Carl Albert, Kennedy lamented, "Civil rights did it." When historian and presidential adviser Arthur M. Schlesinger Jr. complemented Kennedy on his remarks, the latter bitterly replied, "Yes, and look at what happened to area development the very next day in the House." He then added, "But of course, I had to give that speech, and I'm glad that I did."

=== Civil rights legislation ===
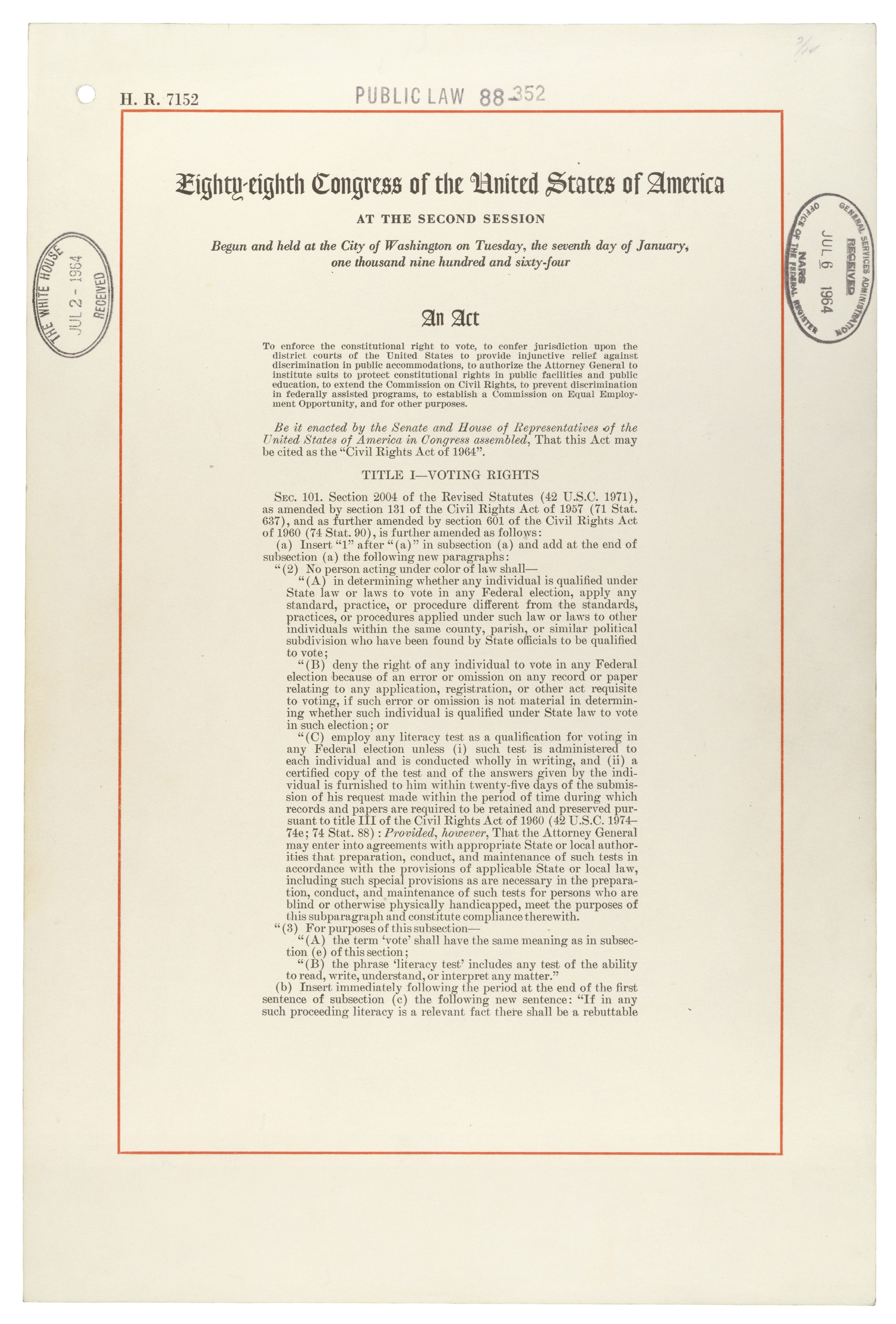
First page of the Civil Rights Act of 1964

The week after the speech was marked by vigorous legislative activity as the Justice Department worked on finishing Kennedy's proposals while Democratic leadership discussed strategies for enacting them. On June 19, Kennedy sent his civil rights bill to Congress. In addition to his proposals made in February, the bill called for equal accommodations in public facilities, provisions for the Attorney General to initiate school desegregation suits, new programs to ensure fair employment practices such as support of a Fair Employment Practice Committee, the establishment of a Community Relations Service, and the granting of authority to the federal government to withhold funds from programs and activities in which discrimination occurred. In a speech before a joint session, Kennedy implored Congress to pass it, warning that legislative inaction would result in "continued, if not increased, racial strife—causing the leadership on both sides to pass from the hands of reasonable and responsible men to the purveyors of hate and violence, endangering domestic tranquility, retarding our Nation's economic and social progress and weakening the respect with which the rest of the world regards us."

Vice-president Johnson had misgivings about the success of a civil rights bill, at least until appropriations were passed. Senate Majority Leader Mike Mansfield was convinced that mandating the desegregation of public accommodations was unconstitutional. At the same time, civil rights leaders—though they recognized the fact that the bill was the most comprehensive civil rights legislation ever to be considered by Congress—wanted more provisions. Meanwhile, members of the Kennedy administration lobbied in Congress. Secretary Rusk spoke of the Soviet Union's efforts to portray the United States as racist, and Robert Kennedy testified before the Senate Judiciary Committee on conditions in the segregated South. The President wanted the bill to pass before the November 1964 elections to prevent it from becoming a central campaign issue.

In the end, the most vocal support for the civil rights bill came from the participants of the August 28 March on Washington for Jobs and Freedom. The demonstration made Kennedy anxious, but its organizers ensured that it would be used to support his legislation. The 16th Street Baptist Church bombing (in which four black choir girls were killed) in September increased public support for the bill, but legislative progress stagnated in Congress due to the efforts of southern Democrats and conservative Republicans. In an interview that month, the President acknowledged the political cost of his new stance on civil rights: "It has caused a good deal of feeling against the Administration in the South—also, I suppose, in other parts of the country. ... I lost some southern states in 1960 so I suppose I will lose some, maybe more, in 1964. I am not sure that I am the most popular figure in the country today in the South, but that is all right." Still, he remained optimistic about his legislation, commenting in his last-ever press conference on November 14, "However dark the land looks now, I think that 'westward look, the land is bright,' and I think that next summer it may be." On November 22, 1963 Kennedy was assassinated in Dallas, Texas. Johnson was immediately sworn in as president and addressed a joint session of Congress, saying, "No memorial oration or eulogy could more eloquently honor President Kennedy's memory than the earliest possible passage of the civil rights bill for which he fought so long." After an intense legislative effort, the bill was approved by Congress and was signed into law by Johnson as the Civil Rights Act on July 2, 1964.

== Legacy ==
Kennedy's finest moment as president showcased his evolution from a cautious politician into a world leader bold enough to deliver perhaps the finest speech ever on race relations.

— Historian Peniel E. Joseph, 2013

The address was Kennedy's most dramatic statement on African-American civil rights. It transformed the political discourse of the subject from that of a legal issue to that of a moral one. (Note: Gardner disagrees with the assessment that Kennedy was the first president to discuss civil rights in moral terms, writing that "so many contemporary journalists ... [have] failed to take appropriate notice of [President Harry S. Truman]'s June 29, 1947, speech to the NAACP—a public address that was delivered sixteen years before John Kennedy finally acted decisively on civil rights.") The emotional impact of the oration was enhanced by the fact that it had occurred only a day after Kennedy's American University speech, putting it in the context of a greater political moment. Sorensen asserted that it signified the end of manifest resistance to university desegregation by state governments. It indicated a significant shift in policy for the Kennedy administration, which, from that point on, assumed the goals of the civil rights movement. Historian Carl Bauer said that the speech "marked a turning point" for the President, who then became a central figure of the civil rights movement, and signified the beginning of a "second Reconstruction" in which all three branches of the federal government worked together to ensure the rights of African Americans.

Sorensen considered the address one of Kennedy's most important speeches, second only to the American University speech. Louis E. Martin called it "the most forthright statement ever made on civil rights." In an editorial appearing in The New York Times on June 11, 2013, historian Peniel E. Joseph wrote of the oration as "Kennedy's finest moment." Kennedy's posthumous reputation as a key proponent of civil rights is largely because of the speech. In another written piece on the 50th anniversary of Kennedy's death, Joseph asserted that by delivering the speech Kennedy had "[i]n one fell swoop ... placed himself not simply on the side of the civil rights movement, but as one of that movement's champions."

== See also ==
- Law Day Address
- "I Have a Dream"
