= Law Day (United States) =

May 1 celebration of the roles of law in the United States

Law Day, U.S.A.
- Observed by: United States
- Date: May 1
- Next time: 1 May 2027
- Frequency: annual

On May 1 the United States officially recognizes Law Day. It is meant to reflect on the role of law in the foundation of the country and to recognize its importance for society.

== History ==
In 1958, President Dwight D. Eisenhower declared May 1 to be Law Day in the United States. The first day of May has been celebrated since before that time in parts of the world as May Day or International Workers' Day: a day to remember the struggles of workers for better wages and working conditions, including the eight-hour workday movement.

Law Day was conceived by the late Hicks Epton, an attorney from Wewoka, Oklahoma, who served as Oklahoma Bar Association president in 1953. Before he became president, Mr. Epton served as head of the public relations committee, and in 1951, he launched one of the most important public relations programs ever undertaken by the OBA: Know Your Liberties – Know Your Courts Week. This was one of the last weeks of April dedicated to educating the public about the legal system and celebrating the liberties we have as Americans. The Know Your Liberties – Know Your Courts Week spread across the nation and earned for the association two Freedom Foundation awards. Law Day, as a national celebration of the law, was originally the idea of Charles S. Rhyne, Eisenhower's legal counsel for a time, who was serving in 1957–1958 as president of the American Bar Association. Eisenhower proclaimed May 1 to be Law Day, U.S.A. in 1958. Its observance was later codified by Public Law 87-20 on April 7, 1961.

Some countries celebrate May Day on the same date, as it is designated Labour Day or International Workers' Day. But on February 5, 1958, President Eisenhower recognized the first Law Day when he proclaimed that henceforth May 1 of each year would be Law Day in the United States. He stated: "In a very real sense, the world no longer has a choice between force and law. If civilization is to survive it must choose the rule of law." Today, many local bars and legal education associations, such as the Florida Law Related Education Association and the New York State Bar Association, use Law Day as a legal education tool, especially for students.

Like Earth Day, Law Day is not a government holiday. To celebrate Law Day, some local bar associations hold a luncheon, featuring speakers who discuss topics such as justice or the liberties provided for by the United States Constitution. Also, attorneys might visit schools and talk to students about the American legal system.

The American Bar Association designates a theme to highlight an important issue relating to the law or legal system. For example, the 2014 theme was American Democracy and the Rule of Law: Why Every Vote Matters. The theme reflects the importance of voting rights, ballot box accessibility and voter engagement. The ABA provides resources on its Law Day website, www.lawday.org, to mark the occasion, and also holds several national Law Day programs in Washington, D.C., on April 30 and May 1.

== Criticism ==
The day has been criticized as being intended to reduce the influence of May Day (or International Workers' Day), a holiday that originated with a general strike on 1 May 1886 in the campaign for the eight-hour day in the United States, which culminated in the Haymarket affair in Chicago. The intent the holiday to reduce worker influence was explicitly noted by President Donald Trump during his 2025 Law Day proclamation.

It became an international day in support of American workers who were being subjected to brutal violence and judicial punishment.

== Codification ==
36 U.S.C. § 113 states, in part:

Law Day, U.S.A., is a special day of celebration by the people of the United States—
(1) in appreciation of their liberties and the reaffirmation of their loyalty to the United States and of their rededication to the ideals of equality and justice under law in their relations with each other and with other countries; and
(2) for the cultivation of the respect for law that is so vital to the democratic way of life.

Missouri § 9.050 RSMo states, in part:

In order to rededicate Missourians to the principles of the democratic form of government; to emphasize that ours is a government of law and not of men; and to further our philosophy that, "The Welfare of the People shall be the Supreme Law", May first of each year shall be designated as "Law Day U.S.A."

== See also ==
- Law Day Address
- May Day
- International Workers' Day
- Labour Day
- Loyalty Day
- Holidays of the United States
