= Law Day Address =

1961 speech by Robert F. Kennedy

- Date: May 6, 1961; 65 years ago
- Time: 11:00 AM
- Venue: University of Georgia School of Law
- Location: Athens, Georgia
- Theme: Rule of law/Civil rights

Robert F. Kennedy's Law Day Address was delivered on May 6, 1961 (Law Day) to the students of the University of Georgia School of Law in Athens, Georgia. It was his first official speech as United States Attorney General outside the capital, and the first endorsement of the civil rights movement by the Kennedy administration. Kennedy used most of the address to talk about civil rights and how he planned to enforce them. He placed a heavy emphasis on the rule of law and the example the United States would be setting for the international community in the face of communism. Kennedy had spent a substantial amount of time preparing for the speech, which ultimately distracted him from the Freedom Rides that would test his resolve to ensure civil rights in its immediate aftermath.

== Background ==
Robert F. Kennedy had been preparing for his first speech as Attorney General outside of Washington D.C. for five weeks, which itself went through seven different drafts with a "Southern Brain Trust" of advisers and particular assistance from Assistant Attorney General Burke Marshall and John Seigenthaler. Over time the work transitioned from a statement on organized crime to one about civil rights. Kennedy wanted to make it apparent that he aimed to change the political climate in America.

The situation at the University of Georgia was tense, as the school had only been integrated in January and had been subject to violent protests. The Bay of Pigs Invasion had only occurred less than a month before Law Day, and the Freedom Riders had just entered the South the day before. Vandals had painted "Yankee go home" on a sidewalk, but this was washed away before the speech.

Before Kennedy arrived on May 6, a group of protesters gathered outside the lecture hall. Police arrested five fundamentalist ministers with signs saying "The Bible teaches separation." Georgia Governor and university alumnus Ernest Vandiver, a critic of the Kennedy administration's attitude towards segregation, was noticeably absent from the event, instead choosing to go to the Kentucky Derby. Among those in attendance were Athens Mayor Ralph Snow, State Senator Julian Cox, and Charlayne Hunter, one of the students who was involved in the integration of the school.

Attorney General Kennedy, with his hands trembling, gave his speech at 11:00 AM before about 1,600 students.

== Summary ==
Kennedy opened by thanking Georgia's citizens for giving his brother, President John F. Kennedy, the largest percentage of the popular vote out of all the states during the 1960 election. He shortly thereafter brought up his brother's proclamation of Law Day:

In his Proclamation urging us to observe this day, the President emphasized two thoughts. He pointed out that to remain free the people must "cherish their freedoms, understand the responsibilities they entail, and nurture the will to preserve them." He then went on to point out that "law is the strongest link between man and freedom." I wonder in how many countries of the world people think of law as the "link between man and freedom." We know that in many, law is the instrument of tyranny, and people think of law as little more than the will of the state or the Party – not of the people.

Kennedy listed three areas in which the Justice Department was involved that required immediate attention. The first, Kennedy argued, was organized crime:

In too many major communities of our country, organized crime has become big business. It knows no state lines. It drains off millions of dollars of our national wealth, infecting legitimate businesses, labor unions and even sports. Tolerating organized crime promotes the cheap philosophy that everything is a racket. It promotes cynicism among adults. It contributes to the confusion of the young and to the increase of juvenile delinquency.

The second area was price fixing:

We have been particularly concerned lately in the Department of Justice about the spread of illegal price-fixing. I would say to you, however, it is merely symptomatic of many other practices commonly accepted in business life. Our investigations show that in an alarming number of areas of the country businessmen have conspired in secret to fix prices, made collusive deals with union officials, defrauded their customers and even in some instances cheated their own government.

He then warned about how this negatively affected the argument for capitalism in the Cold War:

Our enemies assert that capitalism enslaves the worker and will destroy itself. It is our national faith that the system of competitive enterprise offers the best hope for individual freedom, social development and economic growth. Thus, every businessman who cheats on his taxes, fixes prices or underpays his labor, every union official who makes a collusive deal, misuses union funds, damages the free enterprise system in the eyes of the world and does a disservice to the millions of honest Americans in all walks of life.

Kennedy spent the most time talking about the third area; civil rights. Kennedy first pointed out how the international community was looking for sides to choose in the Cold War. He stressed that by leading by example in respecting civil rights in an orderly manner, the United States would attract populations of developing countries away from communism. He then shifted to matters in Virginia, where the schools in Prince Edward County had been shut down in the face of forced integration. Kennedy defended the controversial actions of the federal government on the matter:

It is now being said, however, that the Department of Justice is attempting to close all public schools in Virginia because of the Prince Edward situation. This is simply not true; nor is the Prince Edward suit a threat against local control. We are maintaining the orders of the court. We are doing nothing more and nothing less. And if any one of you were in my position you would do likewise, for it would be required by your oath of office. You might not want to do it. You...might not like to do it. But you would do it because it would be required. And beyond that, I can not believe that anyone can support a principle which prevents more than a thousand of our children in one county from attending public school, especially when this step was taken to circumvent the orders of the court. Our position is quite clear. We are upholding the law. Our action does not threaten local control. The federal government would not be running the schools in Prince Edward County any more than it is running the University of Georgia or the schools in my state of Massachusetts. In this case, in all cases, I say to you today that if the orders of the court are circumvented, the Department of Justice will act. We will not stand by and be aloof — we will move.

Kennedy shared his belief that the Supreme Court's Brown v. Board of Education ruling against segregated schools was just. He conceded that this wasn't pertinent; the courts had made their decision, and that was the law. This expressed Kennedy's philosophy at the time that the law held supremacy over cultural issues and local concerns and that it was the foundation of enforcing civil rights. Kennedy promised that as attorney general he would enforce civil rights statutes and other federal legislation. He attempted to invoke a universal sense of responsibility and commitment with a quote by the Georgian Henry W. Grady:

"This hour little needs the loyalty that is loyal to one section, and yet holds the other in enduring suspicion and estrangement. Give us the broad and perfect loyalty that loves and trusts Georgia alike with Massachusetts — that knows no South, no North, no East, no West, but endears with equal and patriotic love every foot of our soil, every state of our union. A mighty duty, sir, and a mighty inspiration, impels every one of us tonight to lose in patriotic consecration whatever estranges, whatever divides. We, sir, are Americans, and we stand for human liberty."

Kennedy finished:

The road ahead is full of difficulties and discomforts. But as for me, I welcome the challenge. I welcome the opportunity, and I pledge to you my best effort — all I have in material things and physical strength and spirit to see that freedom shall advance and that our children will grow old under the rule of law. Thank you very much.

Kennedy then returned to his seat. After a brief pause, the audience broke into applause for around half a minute.

== Aftermath ==
The address marked the first official endorsement of civil rights by the Kennedy administration. Robert Kennedy's statements were idealistic and somewhat naive; he believed that he could scare the South into compliance under the threat of enforcing the law. He had made a promise to defend civil rights, which was almost immediately tested as the Freedom Riders were caught up in violence while challenging segregation in the South. Being focused on his speech preparations and the fallout from the Bay of Pigs Invasion distracted his attention away from the Freedom Rides as they began. Three days following the speech, White House Press Secretary Pierre Salinger stated that President John F. Kennedy would be backing away from some of the civil rights planks that he had supported in the election.

On May 10, 1961 Representative John Brademas of Indiana praised Kennedy's speech before Congress.

== See also ==
- Report to the American People on Civil Rights
