= 45/85 =

- Genre: Television documentary
- Written by: David Bohrman; Peter Jennings; Ted Koppel; Eleanor Prescott; Pete Simmons
- Directed by: Roger Goodman
- Presented by: Ted Koppel; Peter Jennings
- Country of origin: United States
- Original language: English
- No. of episodes: 1

Production
- Executive producer: Av Westin
- Producers: Mark Foley; Edward Hersh
- Production locations: New York, NY
- Editors: Larry Alperr; Mark Stephen Bogni; Robert J. Brandt; Walter Essenfeld; James Sutton
- Running time: 3:00:00
- Production company: ABC News

Original release
- Network: ABC
- Release: September 15, 1985

Related
- Our World

45/85 is an ABC News television documentary. It aired on September 18, 1985. The three-hour program combined archive film and television footage with new interviews to document post-World War II history, focusing especially on the Cold War. That special was produced by Av Westin, who also produced Our World.

Ted Koppel and Peter Jennings were the co-anchors. The executive producer of the broadcast was Av Westin and it was written by Koppel, Jennings and senior producer Pete Simmons. 45/85 featured interviews with then President Ronald Reagan, as well as interviews with every living former President, Jimmy Carter, Gerald Ford and Richard Nixon. In a stylistic innovation, 45/85 confined itself in its other interviews to people who were eyewitnesses and participants of the events they described, rather than historians or "experts."

The success of 45/85 led ABC to create the documentary series Our World in 1986. Our World, with a similar format blending archive footage and eyewitness interviews, was critically acclaimed but low-rated and ABC canceled it after a single season.
