= Ray Gandolf =

- Born: Raymond L. Gandolf; April 2, 1930; Norwalk, Ohio, United States
- Died: December 2, 2015 (aged 85); Manhattan, New York City, United States
- Education: Northwestern University (B.S.)
- Occupation: Sports broadcaster
- Employer(s): CBS; ABC Television
- Spouse: Blanche Cholet (wife)
- Children: 5
- Awards: Emmy Awards (1987); Peabody Awards duPont Award

Raymond L. Gandolf (April 2, 1930 – December 2, 2015) was an American sports broadcaster on CBS, who went on to become a co-anchor of the historical series Our World for ABC Television, and also reported from four Olympic Games.

== Life ==
Gandolf was born in Norwalk, Ohio on April 2, 1930. He was married to Blanche Cholet and had five daughters. He earned a Bachelor of Science degree in Speech from Northwestern University.

Gandolf, along with Linda Ellerbee and Richard Gerdau, won a writing Emmy Award in 1987 for an episode of Our World. He also received a Peabody Awards and a duPont Award.

Gandolf died in Manhattan on December 2, 2015 at the age of 85.
