= Stand in the Schoolhouse Door =

1963 protest against racial integration of schools in Alabama

- Part of the civil rights movement
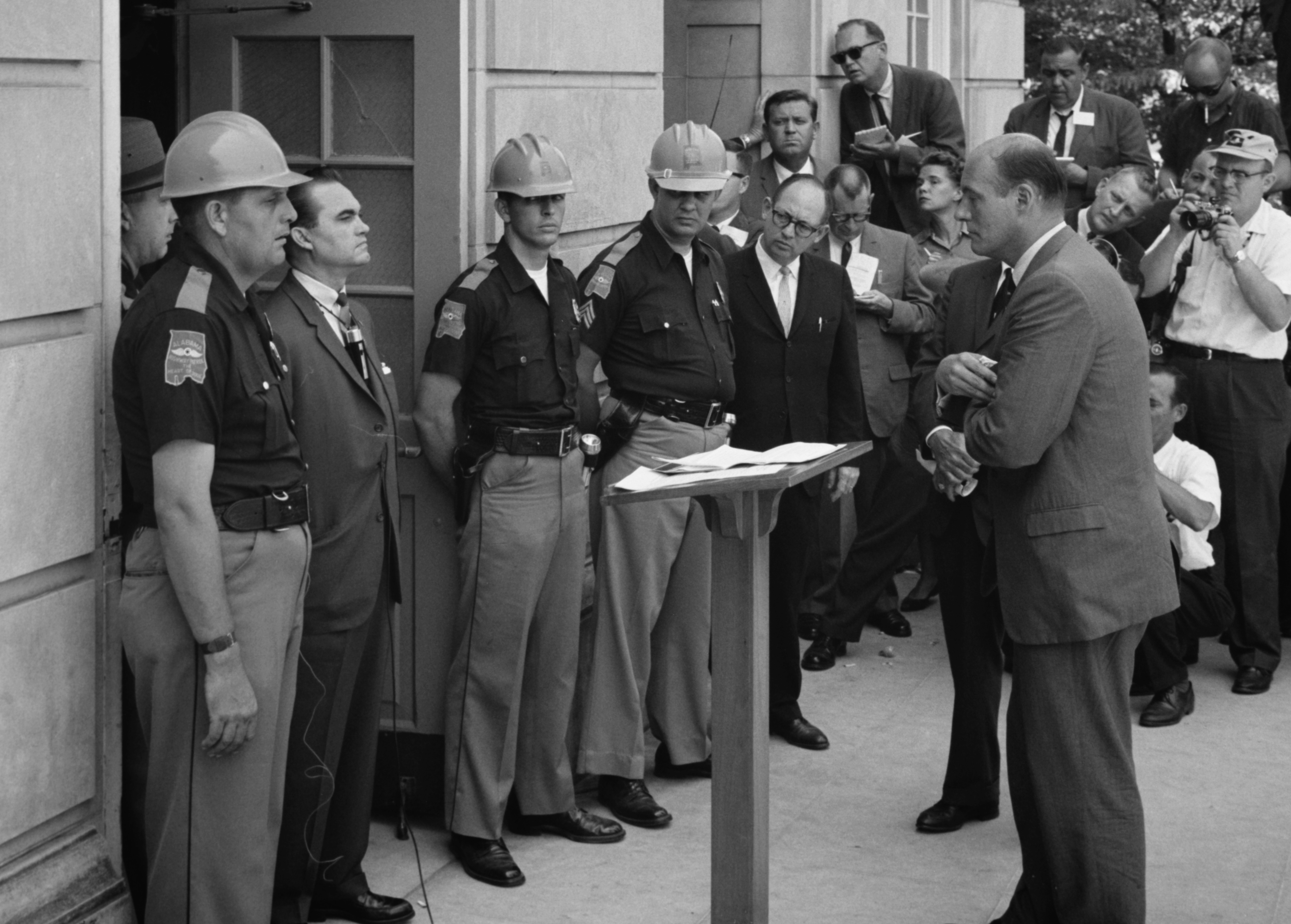
- Attempting to block integration at the University of Alabama, Governor of Alabama George Wallace stands at the door of Foster Auditorium while being confronted by U.S. Deputy Attorney General Nicholas Katzenbach.
- Date: June 11, 1963; 63 years ago
- Location: University of Alabama in Tuscaloosa, Alabama; 33°12′29″N 87°32′38″W
- Caused by: Brown v. Board of Education (1954); Lucy v. Adams (1955); United States v. Wallace (1963)
- Result: Vivian Malone and James Hood register for classes at University of Alabama; George Wallace gains national attention; President Kennedy delivers a Speech on Civil Rights the same day

Lead figures
Students: Vivian Malone; James Hood; The White House: John F. Kennedy, President; Robert F. Kennedy, Attorney General; Nicholas Katzenbach, Deputy Attorney General; Henry V. Graham, Guard General	George Wallace, Governor

The Stand in the Schoolhouse Door took place at Foster Auditorium at the University of Alabama on June 11, 1963. In a symbolic attempt to keep his inaugural promise of "segregation now, segregation tomorrow, segregation forever" and stop the desegregation of schools, George Wallace, the Democratic governor of Alabama, stood at the door of the auditorium as if to block the way of the two African American students attempting to enter: Vivian Malone and James Hood.

In response, Democratic President John F. Kennedy issued Executive Order 11111, which federalized the Alabama National Guard, and Guard General Henry V. Graham then commanded Wallace to step aside. Wallace spoke further, but eventually moved, and Malone and Hood completed their registration. The incident brought Wallace into the national spotlight.

== Background ==
On May 17, 1954, the Supreme Court of the United States handed down its decision in Brown v. Board of Education, which held that the education of black children in separate public schools from their white counterparts violated the Equal Protection Clause of the Fourteenth Amendment to the United States Constitution. Brown meant that the University of Alabama had to be desegregated. In the years following, hundreds of African-Americans applied for admission, but with one brief exception, (Note: In February 1956, Autherine Lucy started classes under guard at UA as a graduate student after having been admitted three years earlier with Pollie Anne Myers, as the first black students admitted to the university. Lucy's presence was met with threats and a violent riot, and the administration found excuses first to suspend, and then expel her shortly after she enrolled.) all were denied. The university worked with police to find any disqualifying qualities, or when this failed, intimidated the applicants. But, in 1963, three African-Americans—Vivian Malone Jones, Dave McGlathery and James Hood—applied. In early June federal district judge Seybourn H. Lynne ordered that they be admitted, and forbade Governor Wallace from interfering, but did not grant the request that Wallace be barred from the campus.

Wallace privately signaled to the Kennedy administration his intention to avoid fomenting violence, such as had occurred in the September 1962 Battle of Oxford with the desegregation of the University of Mississippi. The head of the Alabama State Police, Albert Lingo, who reported directly to Wallace, warned leaders of the Ku Klux Klan that their members would be arrested if they appeared in Tuscaloosa. Bull Connor, the chief of Birmingham Police, also told Klan members to spread word that Wallace wanted no crowds to gather in the town. Wallace's speechwriter and top aide, Asa Carter, himself a top Klan official, personally visited Edward R. Fields, a leader of the National States' Rights Party, a white supremacist group, also to tell him to stay away from the event. However, Wallace refused to talk directly to Attorney General Robert F. Kennedy when he called to learn of Wallace's plans.

On the eve of the incident, the U.S. Justice Department tried to discredit Wallace by leaking to a Newsday reporter the private health information that the governor was receiving government payments related to a psychiatric disability suffered while flying in bombing missions over Japan during World War II. Wallace confirmed the disability, but Newsday editors refused to run the story.

== Standoff ==
On June 11, Malone and Hood pre-registered in the morning at the Birmingham courthouse. They selected their courses and filled out all their forms there. They arrived at Foster Auditorium to have their course loads reviewed by advisors and pay their fees. Kennedy administration officials, struggling with a potentially violent situation, considered simply bypassing Foster Auditorium and having Malone and Hood escorted directly to their dorm rooms. But given reports of an agitated Wallace, Robert Kennedy told Deputy Attorney General Nicholas Katzenbach, "You'd better give him his show because I'm concerned if he doesn't have it ... that God knows what could happen by way of violence."

Henry Graham salutes and then confronts George Wallace

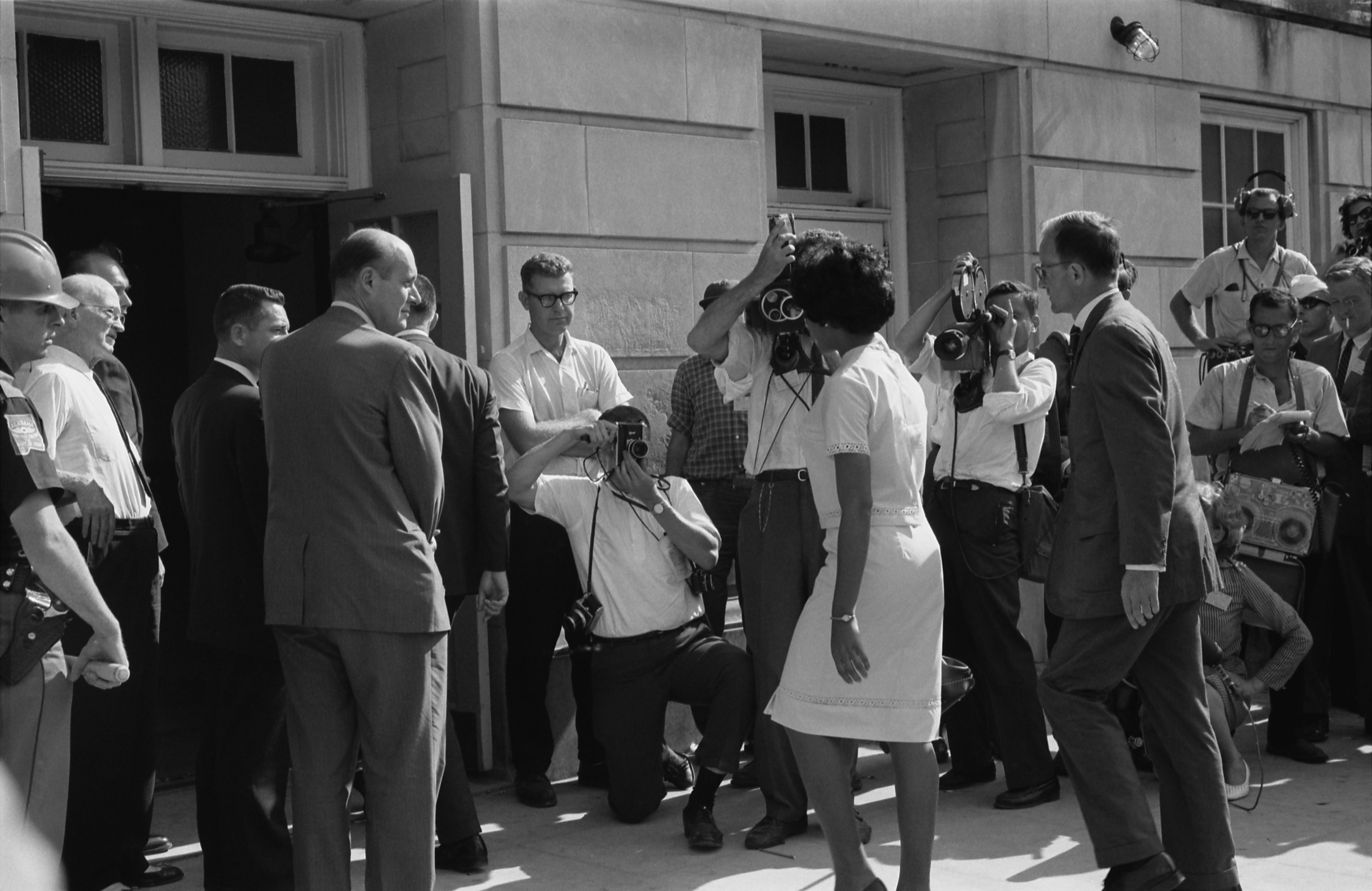
Vivian Malone Jones arrives to register for classes at the University of Alabama's Foster Auditorium

Administration officials also concluded the best optics would be to present the matter as a conflict between state and federal authority, not a racial confrontation between the white governor and the black students. Further, by keeping the students away from the doorway, the administration was not forced to charge Wallace with contempt of a federal court order. So it was that Malone and Hood remained in their vehicle as Wallace, attempting to uphold his promise as well as for political show, blocked the entrance to Foster Auditorium with the media watching. Then, flanked by federal marshals, Katzenbach told Wallace to step aside. However, Wallace interrupted Katzenbach and gave a speech on states' rights.

Katzenbach called President John F. Kennedy, who had previously issued a presidential proclamation demanding that Wallace step aside, and told Kennedy of Wallace's actions in ignoring the proclamation as, according to Wallace, it had no legal force. In response, Kennedy issued Executive Order 11111, which had already been prepared, authorizing the federalization of the Alabama National Guard under the Insurrection Act of 1807. Four hours later, Guard General Henry Graham commanded Wallace to step aside, saying, "Sir, it is my sad duty to ask you to step aside under the orders of the President of the United States." Wallace then spoke further, but eventually moved, and Malone and Hood completed their registration.

Malone recounted that these early moments of confrontation were frightening because of their visible potential for violence. She could not stop thinking about the recent Ole Miss riot that had threatened James Meredith as he integrated that campus and wondering if similar race riots would happen at the University of Alabama.

== Aftermath ==
In the days following the enactment, the National Guard were ordered to remain on the campus owing to a large Ku Klux Klan contingent in the surrounding area. Wallace and Kennedy exchanged volatile telegrams over it. Wallace objected to Kennedy ordering the Guard to remain on the campus and said that Kennedy bore responsibility if something happened. Kennedy responded stating that Executive Order 11111 made it clear that responsibility for keeping the peace remained with the state troopers under Wallace's control and said he would revoke the order if assurances were made. Wallace refused, stating he would not be intimidated and cited that Executive Order 11111 was passed without his knowledge.

Executive Order 11111 was also used to ensure that the Alabama National Guard made sure that black students across the state were able to enroll at previously all-white schools. It was complemented by Executive Order 11118, which provided "assistance for removal of unlawful obstructions of justice in the State of Alabama". As of September 2026, neither Executive Order 11111 nor 11118 has been revoked.

The stage managing of the incident did avoid provoking violence, but it also served Wallace's purposes by amplifying his contention that desegregation was not primarily an issue of racial justice, but one of "states' rights" instead.

Hood left the university two months after the incident. While living in a dorm surrounded by federal marshals, he was threatened with expulsion for a speech he gave that berated Governor Wallace and the University of Alabama, and someone had mailed him a dead black cat. He was also dealing with his father's cancer at the time. Hood said that he left to avoid a "complete mental and physical breakdown."

Malone became the first black graduate of the University of Alabama when she received her bachelor's in business management in 1965. She continued her civil rights activism and in 2000 received an honorary doctorate from the university when she presented the commencement address there.

== Cultural references ==
The incident was detailed in Robert Drew's 1963 documentary film Crisis: Behind a Presidential Commitment. The event was depicted in the 1994 film Forrest Gump, in which Vivian Jones drops her books, which are retrieved by the titular character, and in the 1997 television film George Wallace.

In June 2012, George Wallace Jr. commented on his father's legacy, and mentioned the reference to the event in Bob Dylan's 1964 song "The Times They Are a-Changin' ": "Come Senators, Congressmen, please heed the call. Don't stand in the doorway, don't block up the hall." The younger Wallace said that when he was 14, he sang the song for his father and thought he saw a look of regret in his father's eyes.

== See also ==
- Little Rock Nine
- Report to the American People on Civil Rights
- School integration in the United States
- Timeline of the civil rights movement
- List of African-American pioneers in desegregation of higher education
- University of Georgia desegregation riot
