= Henry V. Graham =

American National Guard general (1916–1999)

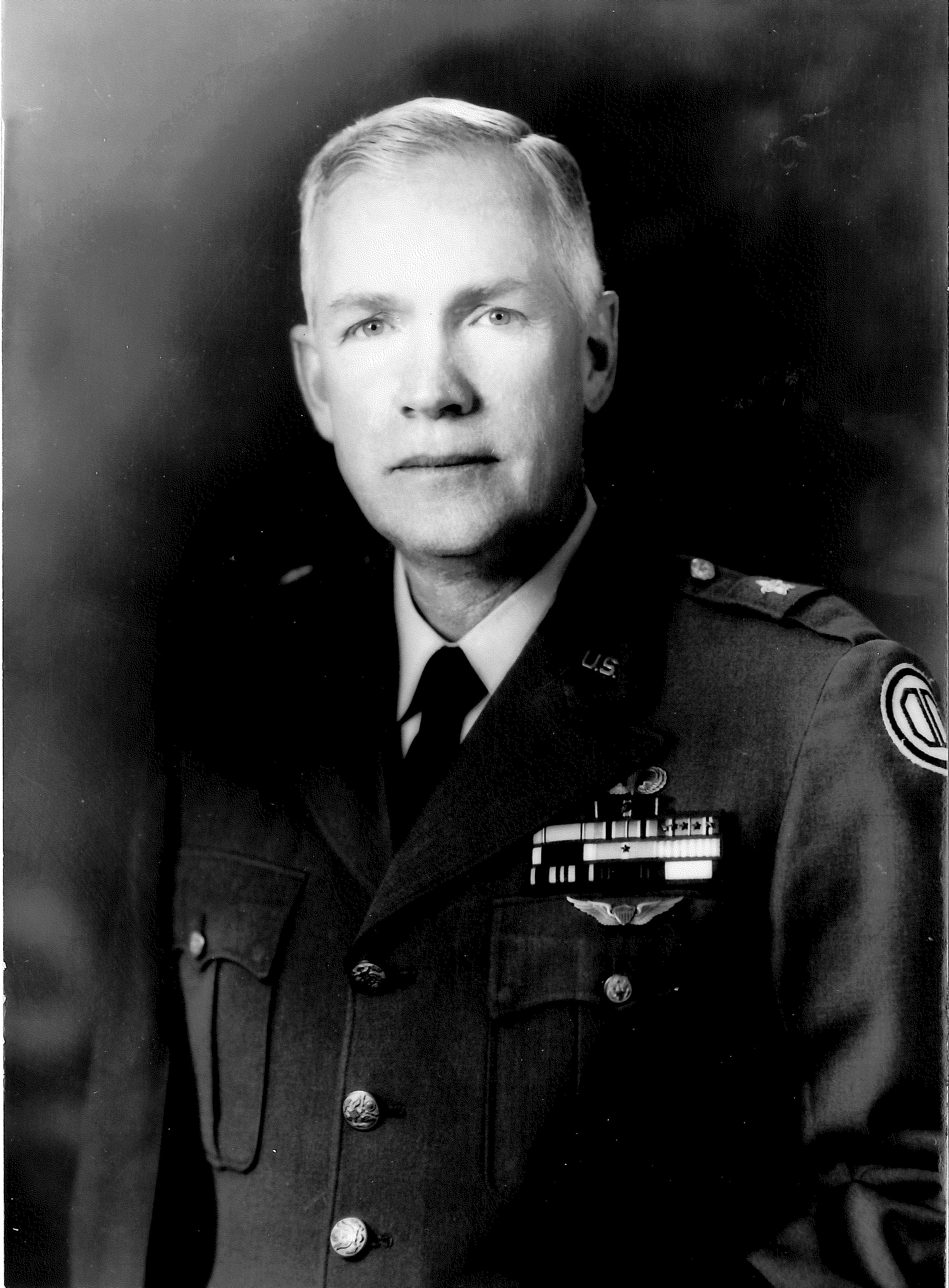
- Born: May 7, 1916; Birmingham, Alabama, U.S.
- Died: March 21, 1999 (aged 82) Birmingham, Alabama, U.S.
- Allegiance: United States
- Branch: Alabama Army National Guard
- Service years: 1934–1970
- Rank: Major General
- Commands: Alabama National Guard; 167th Infantry Regiment, 31st Infantry Division
- Conflicts: World War II; Korean War

General Graham before Governor Wallace at the University of Alabama, 1963.

Henry Vance Graham (May 7, 1916 – March 21, 1999) was an American Army National Guard general known for protecting black activists during the civil rights movement. He is most famous for asking Alabama governor George Wallace to step aside and permit black students to register for classes at the University of Alabama in Tuscaloosa in 1963 during the "Stand in the Schoolhouse Door" incident.

== Biography ==
Graham was born and raised in Birmingham, Alabama. He attended local public schools and then studied at Birmingham–Southern College until 1935.

On March 27, 1934, at the age of 18, Graham joined the Alabama National Guard, a reserve component of the United States Army. In September 1940, he was commissioned as a second lieutenant of infantry. In November 1940, Graham was called to active duty in the Army. After graduating from the Army Command and General Staff College in 1942, he served with the 167th Infantry Regiment (31st Infantry Division), IV Corps, and 7th Army in Europe during World War II. He attained the rank of lieutenant colonel in 1945 and was released from active duty in January 1946. After the war, Graham studied at the Birmingham School of Law until 1950, but did not earn a degree. In 1952, he was again called to active duty during the Korean War, serving anew with the 31st Division and IV Corps. For his military services Graham received two Bronze Star Medals and a Legion of Merit.

In April 1953, Graham was promoted to colonel and given command of the 167th Infantry Regiment, 31st Infantry Division. He served as Adjutant General for the State of Alabama from January 1959 to January 1963 and was promoted to major general in both the National Guard and the Army Reserve. In September 1961, Graham took on the additional responsibility of assistant commander, 31st Infantry Division. Because this was a one-star position, his Army Reserve rank was reduced to brigadier general. After turning over command of the Alabama National Guard to Major General Alfred C. Harrison in 1963, Graham continued to serve as assistant commander of the 31st Infantry Division until January 1968 when the Alabama Army National Guard was reorganized. He then served as assistant commander of the 30th Armored Division until his retirement in 1970. As a general officer, he graduated from fixed-wing flight training at the Army Aviation School in 1963 and a course at the Army War College in 1964.

General Graham had several prominent roles in the American civil rights movement. In 1961, General Graham led the Alabama National Guard to protect the Freedom Riders from mob violence. On the evening of May 21, 1961, Freedom Riders and their supporters met at Ralph Abernathy's First Baptist Church in Montgomery, Alabama to honor their struggle. Martin Luther King Jr. also flew in to offer support. As white mobs gathered outside the church and became increasingly agitated, the Kennedy Administration and Alabama Governor John Malcolm Patterson agreed to employ Alabama National Guard troops to surround the church for safety. At the request of King, General Graham entered the church to inform the crowd that they would have to wait until the next morning to leave the church. At dawn, Graham arranged for the members of the crowd to be escorted to their homes. Two days later, on May 24, Graham was responsible for escorting the Freedom Riders from the Montgomery bus terminal to the Alabama-Mississippi border using a convoy of three planes, two helicopters, and seventeen highway patrol cars.

In his most prominent role, on June 11, 1963, General Graham confronted Governor George Wallace at the University of Alabama for refusing to allow two black students, James Hood and Vivian Malone, to register for classes. Among a crowd of media, Governor Wallace obstructed the doorway of Foster Auditorium in an attempt to disregard federal law requiring the university to integrate. United States Deputy Attorney General Nicholas Katzenbach had approached Wallace earlier in the day and requested his cooperation in standing aside. When Wallace refused, President Kennedy federalized the Alabama National Guard and General Graham was called to the university. Graham approached Wallace with four sergeants, saluted Wallace and said "Sir, it is my sad duty to ask you to step aside under the orders of the President of the United States." The episode is known as the "Stand in the Schoolhouse Door." The episode is re-enacted in the 1994 film Forrest Gump, which includes original footage of General Graham and Governor Wallace outside Foster Auditorium.

From March 21 to 24, 1965, General Graham was responsible for escorting voting-rights marchers in their third attempt to walk during the Selma to Montgomery marches in Alabama. This occurred two weeks after marchers had been beaten and tear-gassed in front of news media for an earlier attempt to march in what became known as Bloody Sunday.

In the 1997 TV movie George Wallace, Graham was portrayed by Jan Johannes.

General Graham died on March 21, 1999, just 6 months after George Wallace. He and his wife, Jane, had four children. He founded the commercial real estate firm Graham & Company.

== Summary of military career ==
Graham served in the National Guard from 1934 until his retirement in 1970 with the rank of major general. He was called to active duty for federal service during World War II and the Korean War, with the following dates of rank.

- Enlisted service: 27 March 1934 – 14 September 1940
  - Private: 25 March 1934
  - Corporal: 24 March 1937
  - Sergeant: 23 April 1937
  - First Sergeant: 27 May 1940
- Second Lieutenant: 15 September 1940 (National Guard) / 25 November 1940 (Army of the United States)
- First Lieutenant (Army of the United States): 28 January 1942
- Captain (Army of the United States): 17 September 1942
- Major (Army of the United States): 24 March 1943
- Lieutenant Colonel: 16 September 1945 (Army of the United States) / 28 October 1945 (Officer Reserve Corps) / 17 December 1946 (National Guard)
- Colonel (National Guard): 1 April 1953
- Major General (National Guard): 21 April 1959
- Major General (Army Reserve): 9 September 1959
- Brigadier General (Army Reserve): 30 April 1962 [Rank of Brigadier General retroactively applied 15 September 1961]

Graham was twice appointed as brigadier general in the Army of the United States in order to perform federalized duties under the authority of the President of the United States. The first occurrence was on June 11, 1963, and again on September 13, 1963; both events were in connection with federalization due to civil rights tensions in Alabama.

On March 13, 1970, while still serving as a major general in the Army National Guard, Henry Graham accepted a "dual commission" as a Chief Warrant Officer in the National Guard, solely for the purposes of performing flight operations as pilot of a McDonnell F-101 Voodoo. This unusual administrative move was to enable General Graham, who did not hold the proper military occupational specialty to serve as a pilot, and to perform flight training and duties as a warrant officer. In theory, General Graham was technically resigned from his general officer's commission each time he flew, was a warrant officer in the air, and then reinstated as a major general when the flight mission concluded. In practice, however, General Graham maintained his rank and insignia at all times.

=== Awards and decorations ===
- Legion of Merit
- Bronze Star Medal (w/1 bronze oak leaf cluster)
- American Defense Service Medal
- American Campaign Medal
- European-African-Middle Eastern Campaign Medal (w/4 bronze service stars & arrowhead device)
- Army of Occupation Medal
- World War II Victory Medal
- Korean Service Medal
- National Defense Service Medal
- United Nations Service Medal
- Korean War Service Medal (retroactive)
- Republic of Korea Presidential Unit Citation (retroactive)
- Army Aviator Badge
- Parachutist Badge
- Expert Badge (with Pistol Bar)
