= History of the University of Alabama =

Public university in Tuscaloosa, US

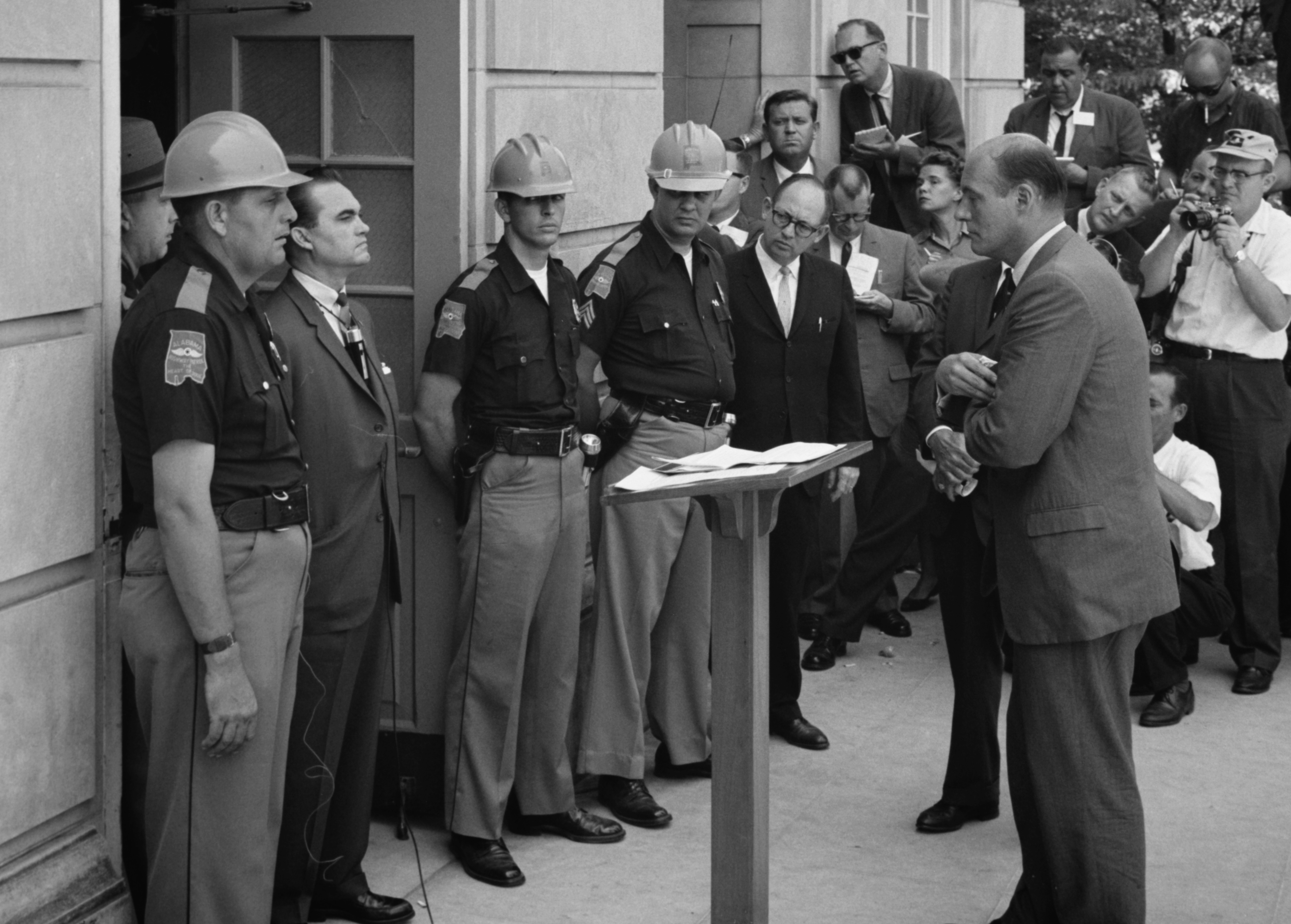
George Wallace's Stand in the Schoolhouse Door incident

The University of Alabama, the state's oldest continuously public university, is a senior comprehensive doctoral-level institution located in Tuscaloosa, Alabama.

== 1820–31: From planning to founding ==
The History of The University of Alabama begins with an act of United States Congress in 1818 authorizing the newly formed Alabama Territory to set aside a township for the establishment of a "seminary of learning." Alabama was admitted to the Union on March 20, 1819, and a second township added to the land grant. The seminary was established by the General Assembly on December 18, 1820, and named The University of the State of Alabama. The legislature appointed a board of trustees to handle the building and opening of the campus, and its operation once complete. The Board selected Tuscaloosa, then capital of Alabama, as the site of the university in 1827, and opened its doors to students on April 18, 1831. The land had been owned by William Marr, whose name is commemorated today in Marrs Spring and the literary Marrs Field Journal. A prominent architect, Captain William Nichols, was commissioned to design the campus. An extensive vineyard was situated in the area of Denny Field and Barnwell Hall.

Most of the material for the early buildings came from university land. Sandstone was quarried near the Black Warrior River, bricks were made locally and lumber came from the University's own timber tract. The work was hard and done by hand, and the University depended on the toil of enslaved workers. "Slaves made the bricks that went into buildings, they worked the grounds and buildings around the campus. They carried water, serviced the dormitories, worked in the dining halls." According to James Sellers' History of the University of Alabama, "Much of the labor was, of course, performed by slaves" but also noted "the stonemasons, trained artisans of Scotch descent, built their pride of craft into the strength and beauty of the buildings they helped erect.

== 1832–60: The frontier school ==
The board of trustees selected the Reverend Alva A. Woods to be the first president of the university. Educated at Phillips Andover, Harvard College and in Europe, Woods hoped to turn the university into a Harvard-style seminary. This proved impossible. Though highly gifted, Woods was not equipped to deal with the discipline problems that came with young men from the frontier.

Admission standards were set high. Simply to enter the university, one had to demonstrate the ability to read Classical Greek and Latin at an intermediate level, with advanced study in those languages to begin immediately. But Alabama, a frontier state a sizable amount of whose territory was still under the control of various Native American tribes, was decades away from possessing the infrastructure necessary to provide adequate education (public or even private) to meet such high standards.

The university was consequently forced to admit many students who were not adequately prepared for university education. For the duration of the Antebellum period, the university would graduate only a fraction of those young men who entered. Of the 105 students who enrolled in 1835, only eight graduated.

Within a month of the opening of the university, social societies emerged. Unlike the social fraternities that would emerge in the next decade, these clubs were academic debate societies by nature. The Erosophic Society was founded in May 1831, while the Philomathic Society came out eight months later.

For $80 a year, students received room and board at the Hotel, now known as the Gorgas House. Washington Hall and Jefferson Hall, called the "colleges," stood three stories high. Each contained twelve apartments, which in turn contained two bedrooms and a sitting room. Forty-eight students resided in each dormitory. Madison and Franklin Halls were built later. Following the American Civil War, the remains of Madison and Franklin Halls were made into memorial mounds. Madison Mound was removed during the 1920s, but Franklin Mound is still used for Honors Day ceremonies. Additionally, an archaeological excavation, conducted in 2007, examined the remains of Washington and Jefferson Halls foundations.

At the center of the campus, where the Gorgas Library is now situated, stood the "grande dame" of the university, the Rotunda. In the 1894 yearbook, Corolla, the building is described as "a circular edifice of three stories, seventy feet in diameter and seventy feet in height, and surrounded by a lofty peristyle of the Ionic order of architecture. The principal story was used for chapel service and academic recitations. This department was long celebrated as being the finest auditorium in the State. In the second story was the circular gallery, supported by carved columns of the Corinthian order. The third story contained the library and the collections in natural history." The Rotunda was destroyed by fire and was never rebuilt. Following an excavation in 1985, the Rotunda's remains were cushioned in sand and covered with concrete to mark where the building had once stood.

Greek life began at the university in 1847 when two young Mobilians visiting from Yale installed a chapter of Delta Kappa Epsilon. When DKE members began holding secret meetings in the old state capitol building that year, the administration strongly voiced its disapproval. Over the next decade, four other fraternities appeared at Alabama: Alpha Delta Phi in 1851, Phi Gamma Delta in 1855, Sigma Alpha Epsilon in 1856, and Kappa Sigma in 1857. Anti-fraternity laws were imposed in that year, but were lifted in 1890s. Eager to have a social organization of their own, women at the university founded the Zeta chapter of Kappa Delta sorority in 1903. Alpha Gamma Delta and Delta Delta Delta soon followed.

== 1861–1902: The military school and beyond ==
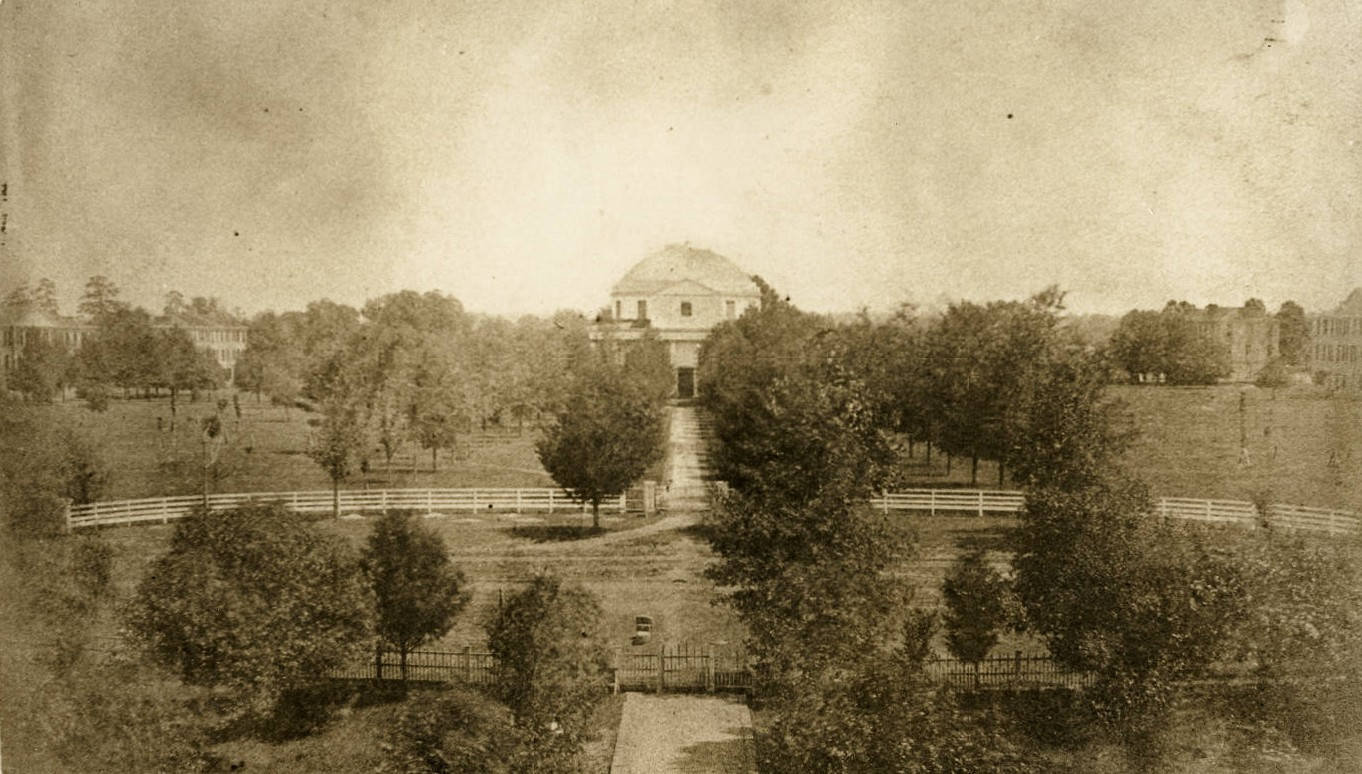
The campus of the University of Alabama in 1859. View of the Quad, with the Rotunda at center and dormitories in the background.

Student discipline remained a struggle. In the 1850s, the school's president, Landon Garland, began lobbying the Legislature to transform the university into a military school. In 1860, with the Civil War impending and in the wake of a violent brawl which resulted in the death of student, the legislature authorized Garland to make the transformation beginning in the fall of 1860. As a result of this transformation, during the Civil War, the school trained officers for the Confederacy.

Because of this role, Union troops burned down the campus in April 1865. Only seven buildings survived the burning, one of which was the President's Mansion and its outbuildings. Frances Louisa Garland, wife of President Landon C. Garland, saved the home from destruction by the Union soldiers. When she saw flames in the direction of the campus, she ran from the Bryce home where the family had taken refuge and demanded the soldiers put out the fire in the parlor. The university reopened in 1871 and shortly after, the military structure was dropped. The other principal buildings today, have new uses. Gorgas House, at different times the dining hall, faculty residence, and campus hotel, now serves as a museum. The Roundhouse, then a sentry box for cadets, later a place for records storage, is a campus historical landmark. The Observatory, now Maxwell Hall, is home to a program called Creative Campus.

In 1880, the United States Congress granted the university 40,000 acres (160 km^{2}) of coal land as partial compensation for the $250,000 in war damages. Some of the money went toward the building of Manly and Clark Halls. In 1887, Clark became the home of the library, whose 7,000 volumes had been destroyed. It was not until 1900 that private donations, including the donation of 1,000 volumes collected by John Leslie Hibbard's father, restored the library to 20,000 books. Garland Hall, which housed the geology museum and lecture rooms, completed what became known as Woods Quad. Tuomey and Barnard Halls were also built before 1900.

The medical school and pharmacy school were in Mobile at the time.

The university was officially opened to women in 1892 after much lobbying by Julia Tutwiler to the Board of Trustees.

== 1903–40: The growing university ==
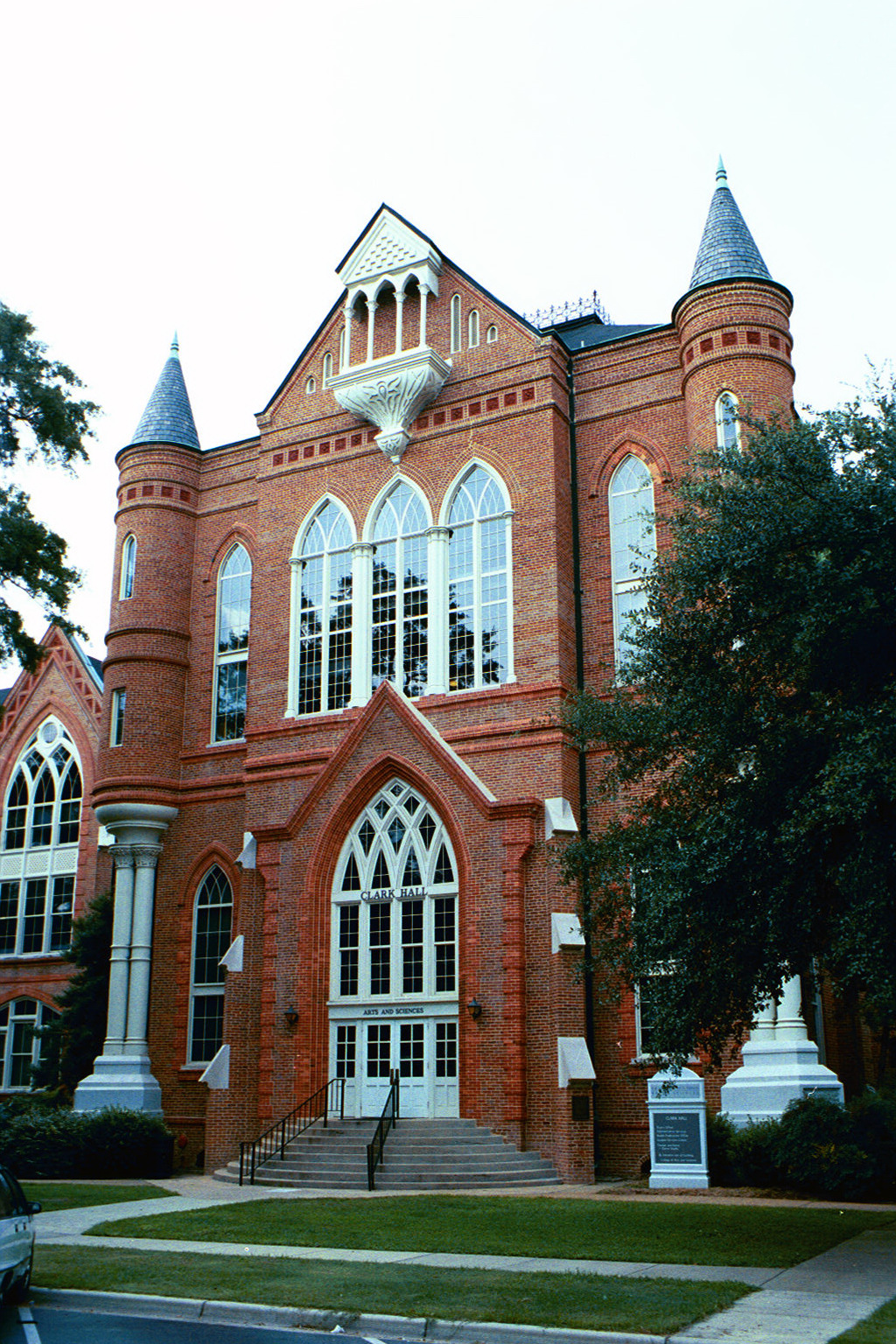
Clark Hall was rebuilt after the Civil War

In 1900 students fomented rebellion against the military system, leading to the resignations of the student commandant and university president James Knox Powers. In 1903 the state legislature abolished the military system that was proving so unpopular with students.

In celebration of the university's seventy-fifth anniversary in 1906, the Greater University fund-raising campaign began, spearheaded by alumni Hill Ferguson and Robert Jemison. The $5,000 which the campaign secured from the state legislature in 1909 went toward the building of Smith and Morgan Halls. Constructed of yellow Missouri brick with Indiana limestone trim, the buildings reflected the Beaux-Arts Greek Revival style of architecture that was popular at the turn of the 20th century.

The first years of the 20th century, when students had more freedom and the university was more established, saw the addition of a glee club, a drama club, a yearbook, and a student newspaper. One of the top female students, Helen Vickers, wrote the lyrics to UA's first alma mater. Female enrollment increased, and football became a passion.

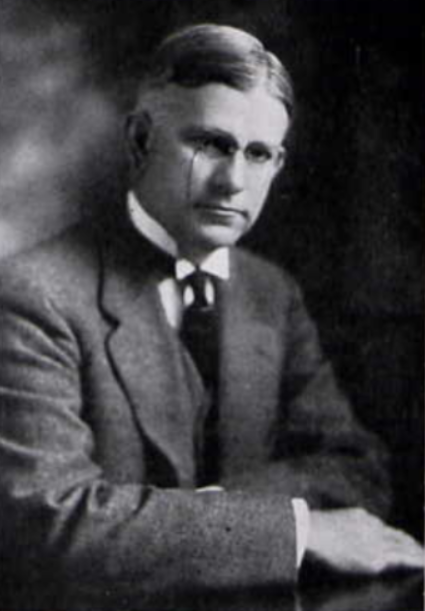
UA President George H. Denny, 1919 Corolla Yearbook

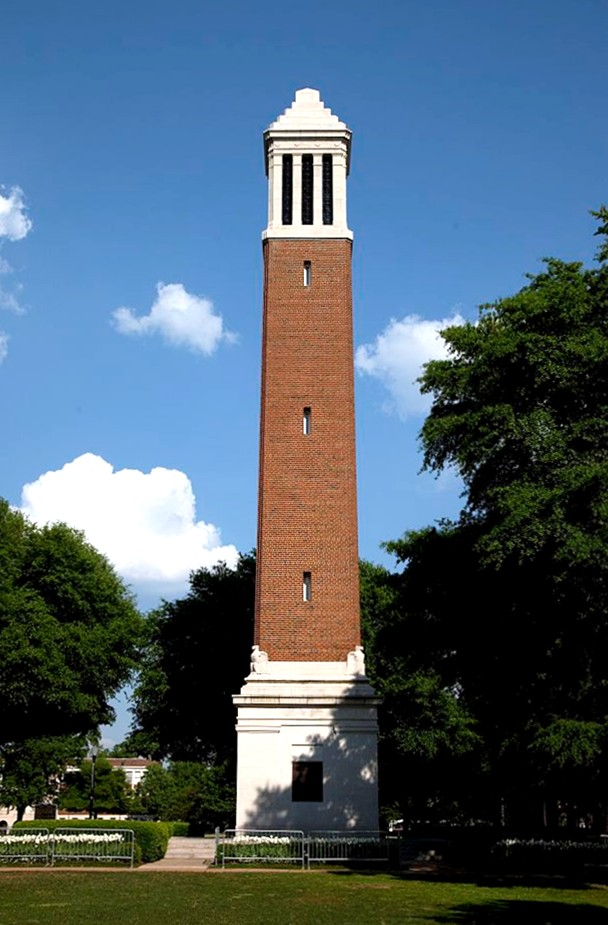
Denny Chimes, built in honor of President Denny

On January 1, 1912, Dr. George H. "Mike" Denny left the presidency of Washington and Lee University in Virginia to lead The University of Alabama through a period of growth.

In 1939, Amelia Gayle Gorgas Library opened.

== 1941–1945: The university and WWII ==
Following America's entry into World War II in 1941, UA again became focused on training military members. Under the leadership of Dr. Raymond Ross Paty the university operated one of the largest military programs in the country.

The University Club was converted into a servicemen's center, and female university students were hostesses to military members passing through Tuscaloosa, and to wounded GIs at Northington Hospital. During this time, few male students remained on campus, as enrollment dropped from nearly 5,000 in the fall of 1941 to 1,850 in spring of 1944. Students, faculty and alumni joined the war effort in either the armed forces or in a related civilian capacity.

By the end of the war, about 350 former students and one faculty member had died in combat or from other war-related causes. Of the dead, 13 had played on the Crimson Tide football team. One alumna, Janice Eloise Ford Beckwith, died while serving with the Red Cross in the Pacific.

While housing and educating nearly 13,000 soldiers and sailors created a strain on space and teaching resources, the university also grew in the areas of research, library facilities, and benefits for faculty and staff. The University of Alabama Press was founded, the medical school moved to Mobile, and the University Club was transferred to UA ownership. Dr. Paty resigned in December 1946, having led The University of Alabama through one of the hardest times in the history not just of UA, but of the nation.

== 1946-2000: The university struggles and grows ==
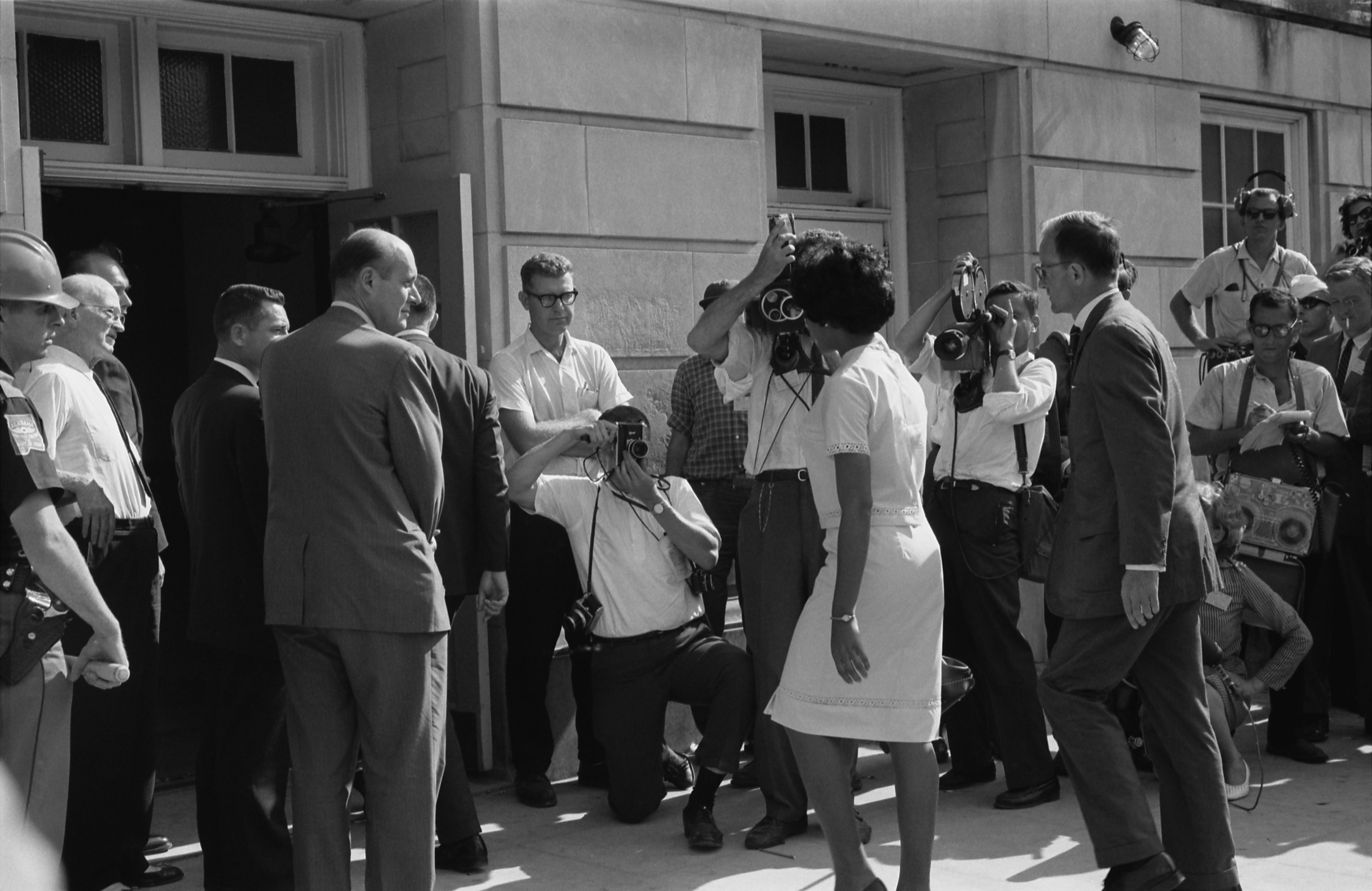
Malone registering for classes at University of Alabama

In 1953, Autherine Lucy sued in Lucy v. Adams to prevent the university from denying admission solely based on race or color. Lucy became the first African-American to attend the school when she was admitted in 1956. On the third day of classes, a hostile mob assembled to prevent Lucy from attending classes. The police were called to secure her admission but, that evening, the University suspended Lucy on the grounds that it could not provide a safe environment. The university overturned her expulsion in 1980, and in 1992, Lucy earned her master's degree in elementary education from the university that she was admitted two decades earlier.

On June 11, 1963, Governor George Wallace attempted to prevent desegregation of that institution by blocking two African-American students, Vivian Malone and James Hood, from class registration at the University's Foster Auditorium in the "Stand in the Schoolhouse Door" incident. When confronted by federal marshals, Wallace stepped aside, and allowed them to register for classes.

The University paid tribute to Autherine Lucy, James Hood and Vivian Malone at the dedication of the Malone-Hood Plaza and Autherine Lucy Clock Tower at Foster Auditorium on November 3, 2010. A 40-foot-tall brick tower, with open arches and four large bronze plaques at its base, tells their stories.
