= 1960 United States presidential election =

Election of John F. Kennedy

- November 8, 1960

537 members of the Electoral College 269 electoral votes needed to win
- Opinion polls
- Turnout: 63.8% (▲3.6 pp)

Nominee	John F. Kennedy	Richard Nixon
Party	Democratic	Republican
Home state	Massachusetts	California
Running mate	Lyndon B. Johnson	Henry Cabot Lodge Jr.
Electoral vote	303	219 (Note: One Oklahoma faithless elector voted for Harry F. Byrd for President and Barry Goldwater for Vice President.)
States carried	22	26
Popular vote	34,220,984 (Note: Official tallies for the popular vote are complicated by unpledged electors in Alabama. The voters of Alabama were faced with voting each of the 11 presidential electors in individual races; while each of the 11 races featured a Republican elector pledged to Nixon, only five races featured a Democratic elector pledged to Kennedy, and the remaining six races featured a Democratic elector that was unpledged. Kennedy is commonly provided the popular votes of the highest-voted Kennedy-pledged elector in Alabama, while the remainder of the Democratic vote is given to the unpledged electors.)	34,108,157
Percentage	49.7%	49.5%
- Presidential election results map. Blue denotes states won by Kennedy/Johnson, red denotes those won by Nixon/Lodge, light blue denotes the electoral votes for Byrd/Thurmond by Alabama and Mississippi unpledged electors, and a vote for Byrd/Goldwater by an Oklahoma faithless elector. Numbers indicate the number of electoral votes allotted to each state.
President before election
Dwight D. Eisenhower
Republican
Elected President
John F. Kennedy
Democratic

Dwight D. Eisenhower, the incumbent president in 1960, whose second term expired at noon on January 20, 1961

A presidential election was held in the United States on November 8, 1960. The Democratic ticket of Senator John F. Kennedy and his running mate, Senate Majority Leader Lyndon B. Johnson, narrowly defeated the Republican ticket of incumbent Vice President Richard Nixon and his running mate, U.N. Ambassador Henry Cabot Lodge Jr. This was the first election in which 50 states participated, marking the first participation of Alaska and Hawaii, and the last in which the District of Columbia did not.

Incumbent Republican president Dwight D. Eisenhower was ineligible to run for a third term due to the term limits established by the Twenty-second Amendment to the United States Constitution, marking this the first election where an incumbent president was term-limited due to the provisions of the United States Constitution. Nixon faced little opposition in the Republican race to succeed popular incumbent Eisenhower. Kennedy, the junior senator from Massachusetts, established himself as the Democratic frontrunner with his strong performance in the 1960 Democratic primaries, including key victories in Wisconsin and West Virginia over Senator Hubert Humphrey. He defeated Senate Majority Leader Lyndon B. Johnson on the first presidential ballot of the 1960 Democratic National Convention, and asked Johnson to serve as his running mate.

Both presidential nominees were relatively youthful, guaranteeing that America would elect its first president born in the 20th century. The 1960 presidential election was among the closest in American history, influenced by a number of factors: Kennedy benefited from the economic recession of 1957–1958, which hurt the standing of the incumbent Republican Party, and he had the advantage of 17 million more registered Democrats than Republicans. Furthermore, the new votes that Kennedy, a Roman Catholic, gained among Catholics almost neutralized the new votes Nixon gained among Protestants. Nixon's advantages came from Eisenhower's popularity, and the economic prosperity of the past eight years. Kennedy strategically focused on campaigning in populous swing states, while Nixon exhausted time and resources campaigning in all fifty states. Kennedy emphasized his youth, while Nixon focused heavily on his experience. Kennedy relied on Johnson to hold the South, and used television effectively.

Kennedy won 303 to 219 in the Electoral College, and he won the reported national popular vote by 112,827, a margin of 0.17 percent. Fourteen unpledged electors from Mississippi and Alabama cast their votes for Senator Harry F. Byrd, as did a faithless elector from Oklahoma. Kennedy's popular vote margin was the second-narrowest in presidential history, only surpassed by the 0.11% margin of the election of 1880, and the smallest ever for a Democrat (notwithstanding the presidential elections in which the winners lost the popular vote). Kennedy became the youngest person ever elected to the U.S. presidency, at 43 years and 5 months. (Note: Theodore Roosevelt remained the youngest president to be inaugurated, at 42 years and 10 months in September 1901, following the death of President William McKinley.)

== Nominations ==
=== Democratic Party ===
Democratic Party (United States) 1960 Democratic Party ticket
John F. Kennedy	Lyndon B. Johnson
for President	for Vice President
U.S. Senator from Massachusetts (1953–1960)	U.S. Senator from Texas (1949–1961)
Campaign

==== Democratic candidates ====
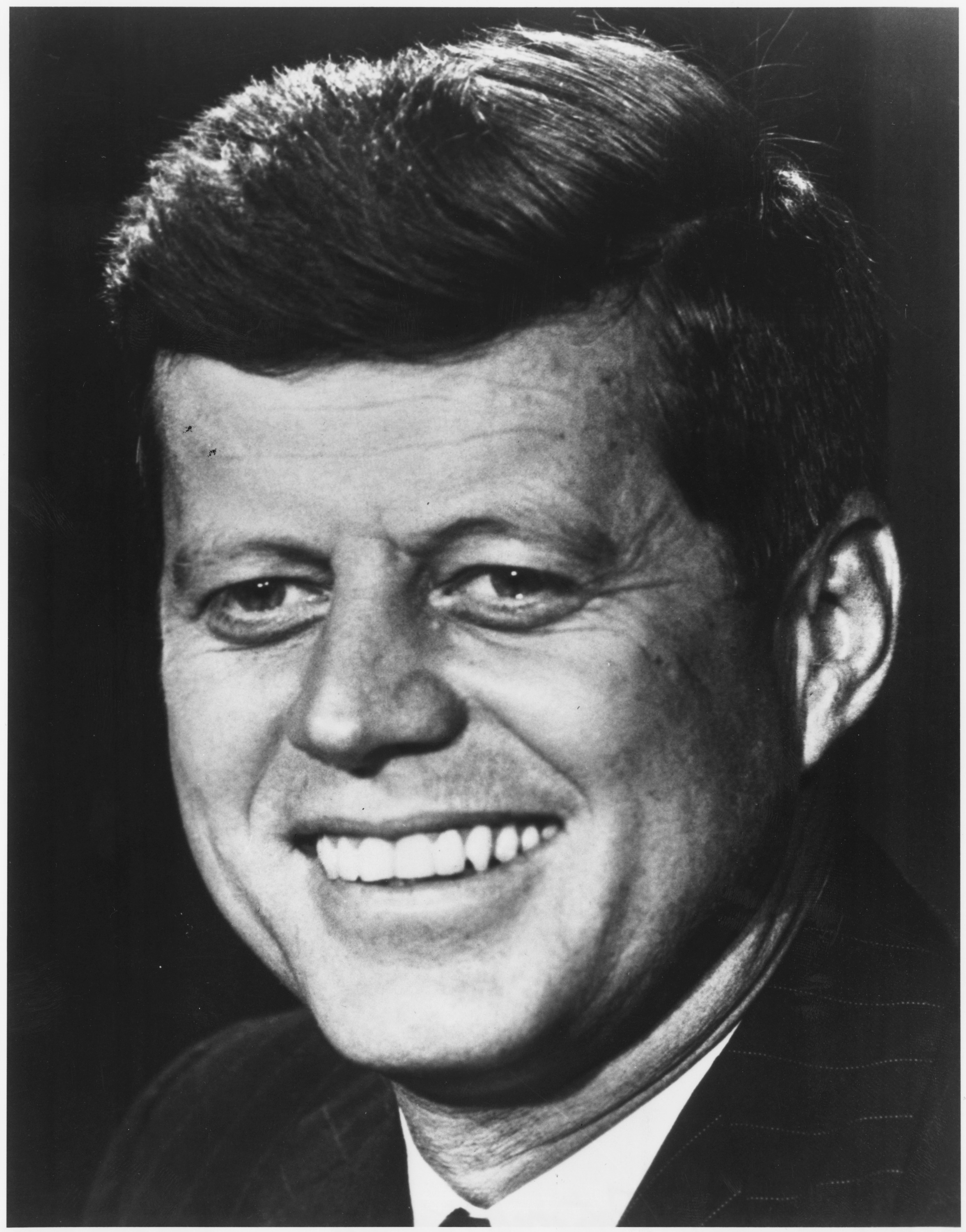
Senator John F. Kennedy from Massachusetts

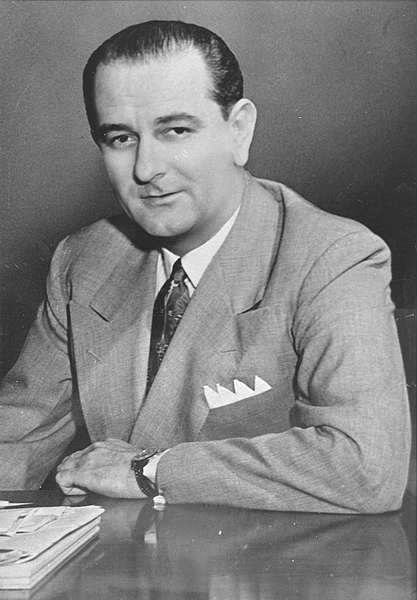
Senate Majority Leader Lyndon B. Johnson from Texas

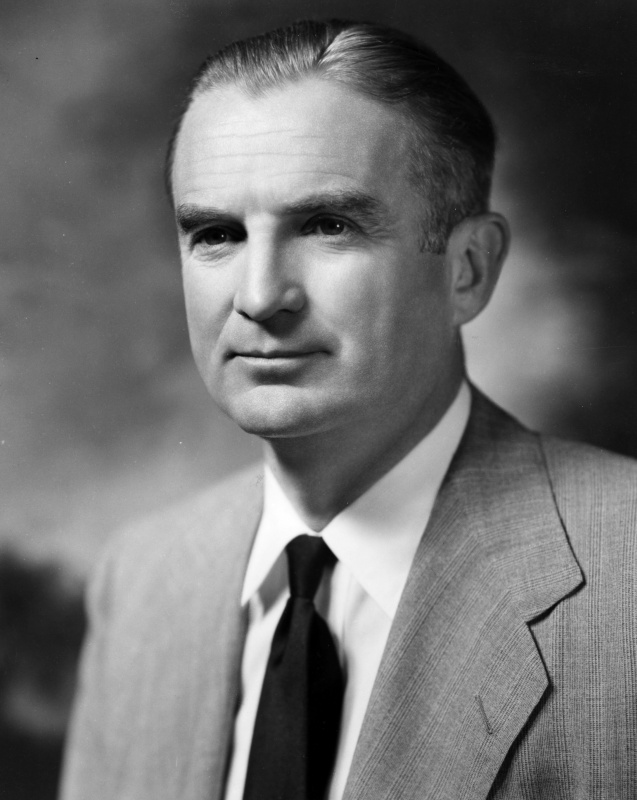
Senator Stuart Symington from Missouri

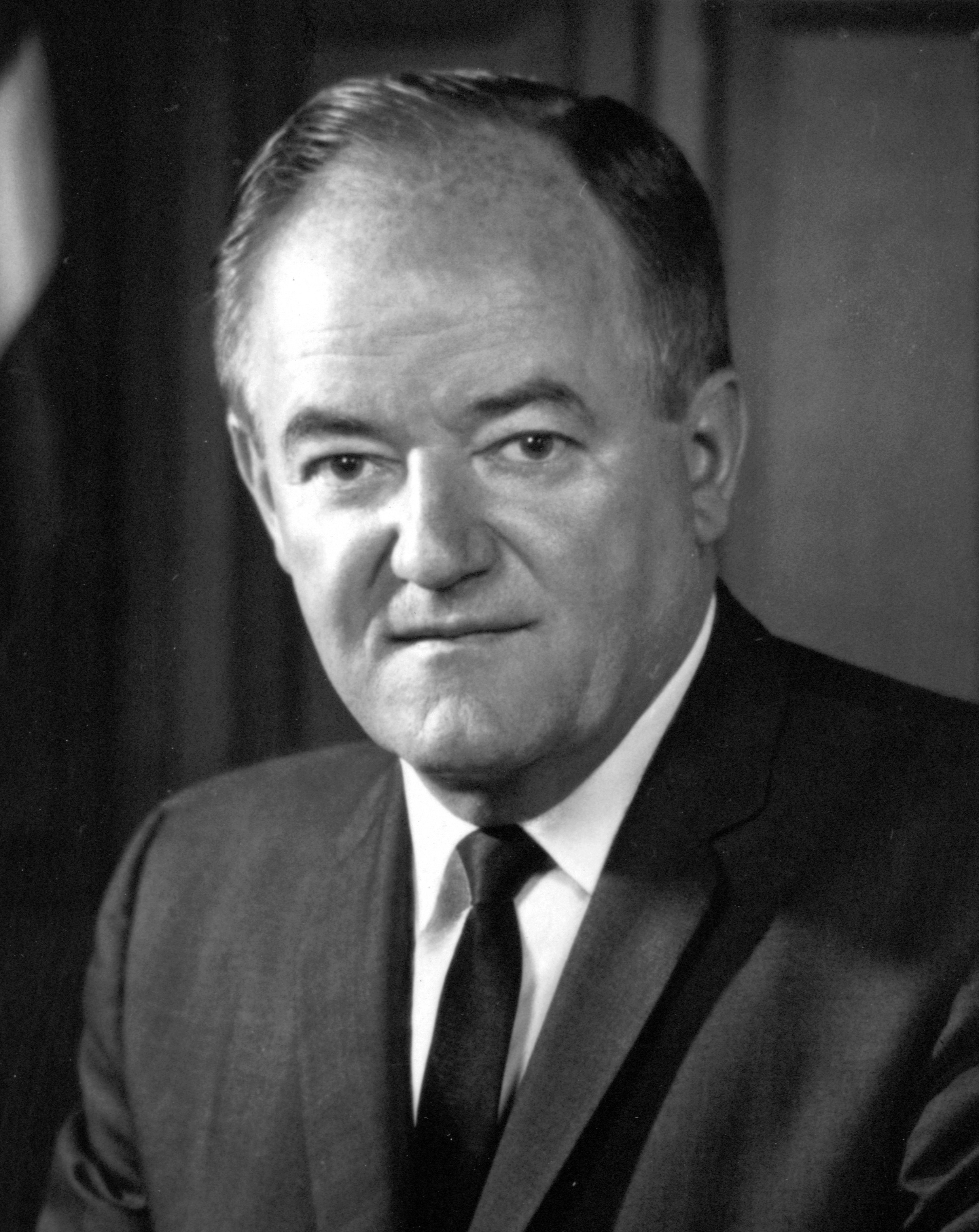
Senator Hubert Humphrey from Minnesota

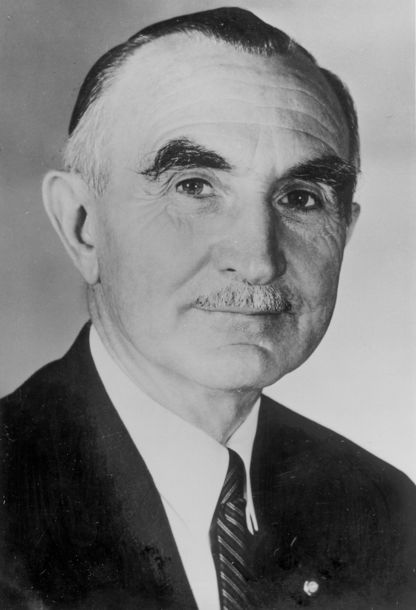
Senator Wayne Morse from Oregon

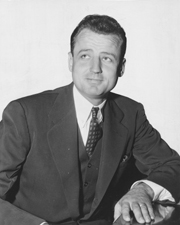
Senator George Smathers from Florida

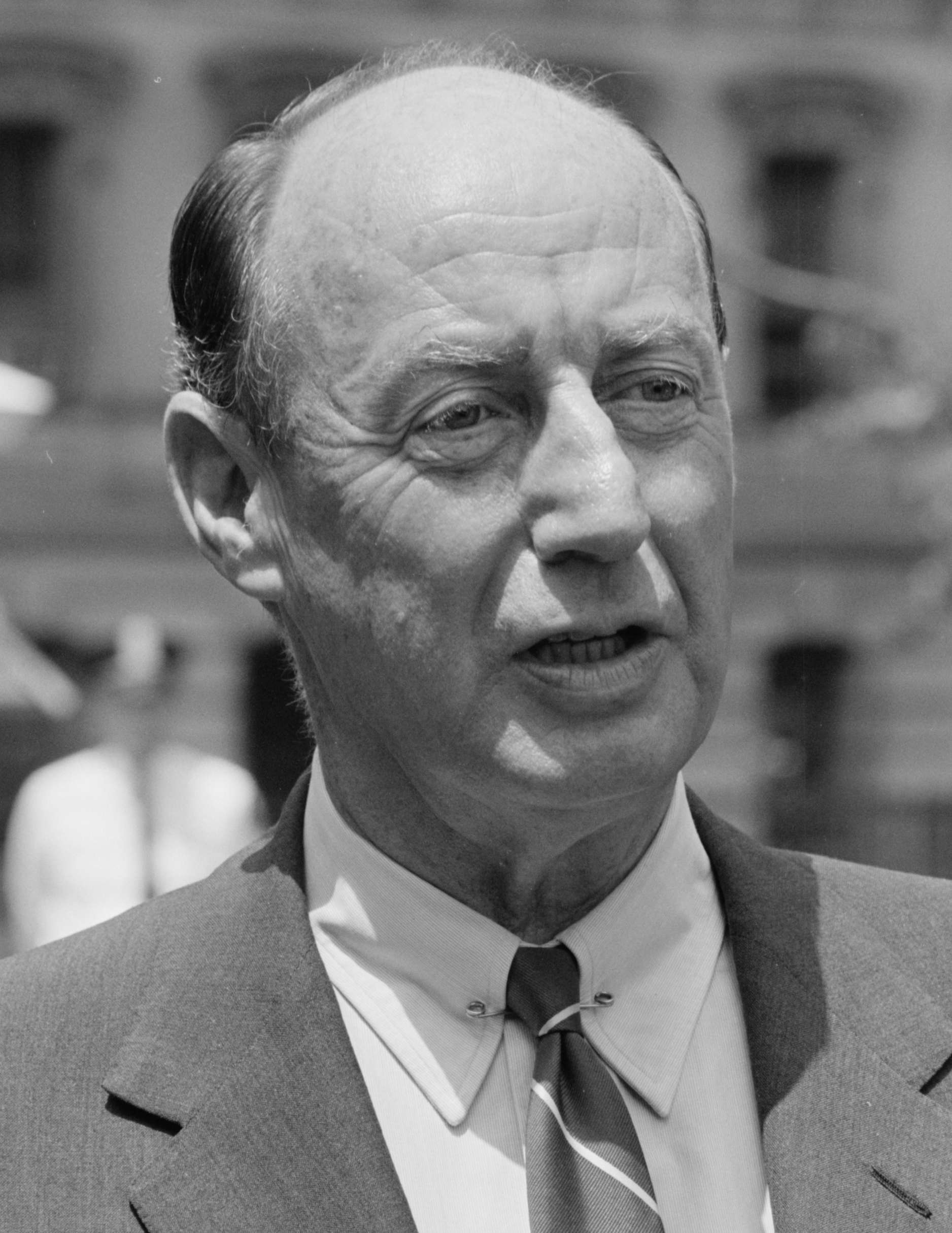
Former Governor Adlai Stevenson of Illinois

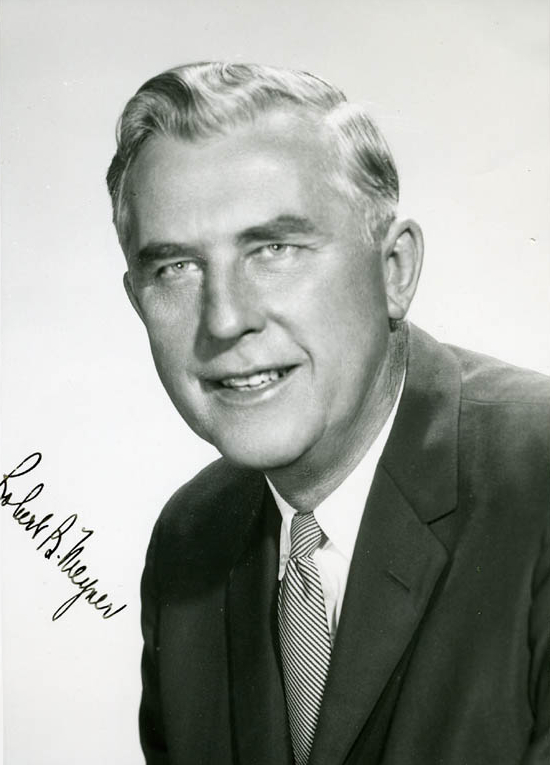
Governor Robert B. Meyner of New Jersey

The major candidates for the 1960 Democratic presidential nomination were United States Senator John F. Kennedy from Massachusetts, Governor Pat Brown of California, Senator Stuart Symington from Missouri, Senator Lyndon B. Johnson from Texas, former nominee Adlai Stevenson, Senator Wayne Morse from Oregon, and Senator Hubert Humphrey from Minnesota. Several other candidates sought support in their home state or region as "favorite son" candidates, without any realistic chance of winning the nomination. Symington, Stevenson, and Johnson all declined to campaign in the presidential primaries. While this reduced their potential delegate count going into the Democratic National Convention, each of these three candidates hoped that the other leading contenders would stumble in the primaries, thus causing the convention's delegates to choose him as a "compromise" candidate acceptable to all factions of the party.

Kennedy was initially dogged by suggestions from some Democratic Party elders (such as former United States President Harry S. Truman, who was supporting Symington) that he was too youthful and inexperienced to be president; these critics suggested that he should agree to be the running mate for another Democrat. Given Kennedy had been a candidate for Stevenson's running mate in 1956 with at least one Democrat, Jacob Arvey directly saying a Stevenson victory could have happened with Kennedy as the running mate it was clear those on the inside understood Kennedy's popularity to those around him, even if they thought his victory as the nomination was unlikely. Realizing that this was a strategy touted by his opponents to keep the public from taking him seriously, Kennedy stated frankly, "I'm not running for vice president; I'm running for president."

1960 Democratic primaries results John F. Kennedy Lyndon B. Johnson Hubert H. Humphrey Various (Note: Favorite sons received the support of Missouri (Stuart Symington), Florida (George Smathers), New Jersey (Robert Meyner), Mississippi (Carroll Gartin), and Hawaii.)

The next step was the primaries. Kennedy's Roman Catholic religion was an issue. Kennedy first challenged Minnesota Senator Hubert Humphrey in the Wisconsin primary, and defeated him. Kennedy's sisters, brothers, and wife Jacqueline combed the state, looking for votes, leading Humphrey to complain that he "felt like an independent merchant competing against a chain store." However, some political experts argued that Kennedy's margin of victory had come almost entirely from Catholic areas, and, thus, Humphrey decided to continue the contest in the heavily Protestant state of West Virginia. The first televised debate of 1960 was held in West Virginia. Kennedy outperformed Humphrey and, in the days following, Kennedy made substantial gains over Humphrey in the polls. Humphrey's campaign was low on funds, and could not compete for advertising and other "get-out-the-vote" drives with Kennedy's well-financed and well-organized campaign, which was not above using dirty tricks to win; prior to the Wisconsin primary, Catholic neighborhoods in Milwaukee were flooded with anti-Catholic pamphlets postmarked from Minnesota. It was assumed Humphrey's campaign had sent them, and it may have helped tilt voters in Wisconsin away from him. In the end, Kennedy defeated Humphrey with over 60% of the vote, and Humphrey ended his presidential campaign. West Virginia showed that Kennedy, a Catholic, could win in a heavily Protestant state. Although Kennedy had only competed in nine presidential primaries, Kennedy's rivals, Johnson and Symington, failed to campaign in any primaries. Even though Stevenson had twice been the Democratic Party's presidential candidate, and retained a loyal following of liberals, his two landslide defeats by Republican United States President Dwight D. Eisenhower led most party leaders and delegates to search for a "fresh face" who could win a national election. Following the primaries, Kennedy traveled around the nation, speaking to state delegations and their leaders. As the Democratic Convention opened, Kennedy was far in the lead, but was still seen as being just short of the delegate total he needed to win.

==== Democratic convention ====
The 1960 Democratic National Convention was held in Los Angeles, California. In the week before the convention opened, Kennedy received two new challengers, when Lyndon B. Johnson, the powerful Senate Majority Leader, and Adlai Stevenson, the party's nominee in 1952 and 1956, officially announced their candidacies. However, neither Johnson nor Stevenson was a match for the talented and highly efficient Kennedy campaign team led by Robert Kennedy. Johnson challenged Kennedy to a televised debate before a joint meeting of the Texas and Massachusetts delegations, which Kennedy accepted. Most observers believed that Kennedy won the debate, and Johnson was unable to expand his delegate support beyond the South. Stevenson's failure to launch his candidacy publicly until the week of the convention meant that many liberal delegates who might have supported him were already pledged to Kennedy, and Stevenson—despite the energetic support of former First Lady Eleanor Roosevelt—could not break their allegiance. Kennedy won the nomination on the first ballot.

Then, in a move that surprised many, Kennedy asked Johnson to be his running mate. He realized that he could not be elected without the support of traditional Southern Democrats, most of whom had backed Johnson. He offered Johnson the vice presidential nomination at the Los Angeles Biltmore Hotel at 10:15 a.m. on July 14, 1960, the morning after being nominated for president. Robert F. Kennedy, who hated Johnson for his attacks on the Kennedy family, and who favored labor leader Walter Reuther, later said that his brother offered the position to Johnson as a courtesy and did not expect him to accept it. When he did accept, Robert Kennedy tried to change Johnson's mind, and failed.

Biographers Robert Caro and W. Marvin Watson offer a different perspective: they write that the Kennedy campaign was desperate to win what was forecast to be a very close race against Nixon and Lodge. Johnson was needed on the ticket to help carry votes from Texas and the Southern United States. Caro's research showed that on July 14, Kennedy started the process, while Johnson was still asleep. At 6:30 a.m., Kennedy asked his brother to prepare an estimate of upcoming electoral votes, "including Texas". Robert Kennedy called Pierre Salinger and Kenneth O'Donnell to assist him. Realizing the ramifications of counting Texas votes as their own, Salinger asked him whether he was considering a Kennedy–Johnson ticket, and Robert replied, "Yes". Between 9 and 10 am, John Kennedy called Pennsylvania governor David L. Lawrence, a Johnson backer, to request that Lawrence nominate Johnson for vice president if Johnson were to accept the role, and then went to Johnson's suite to discuss a mutual ticket at 10:15 am. John Kennedy then returned to his suite to announce the Kennedy–Johnson ticket to his closest supporters and Northern political bosses. He accepted the congratulations of Ohio Governor Michael DiSalle, Connecticut Governor Abraham A. Ribicoff, New York City mayor Robert F. Wagner Jr., and Chicago mayor Richard J. Daley. Lawrence said that "Johnson has the strength where you need it most"; he then left to begin writing the nomination speech. O'Donnell remembers being angry at what he considered a betrayal by John Kennedy, who had previously cast Johnson as anti-labor and anti-liberal. Afterward, Robert Kennedy visited with labor leaders who were extremely unhappy with the choice of Johnson, and, after seeing the depth of labor opposition to Johnson, he ran messages between the hotel suites of his brother and Johnson, apparently trying to undermine the proposed ticket without John Kennedy's authorization and to get Johnson to agree to be the Democratic Party chairman, rather than vice president. Johnson refused to accept a change in plans, unless it came directly from John Kennedy. Despite his brother's interference, John Kennedy was firm that Johnson was who he wanted as running mate, and met with staffers such as Larry O'Brien, his national campaign manager, to say Johnson was to be vice president. O'Brien recalled later that John Kennedy's words were wholly unexpected, but that, after a brief consideration of the electoral vote situation, he thought "it was a stroke of genius".

=== Republican Party ===
Republican Party (United States) 1960 Republican Party ticket
Richard Nixon	Henry Cabot Lodge Jr.
for President	for Vice President
36th Vice President of the United States (1953–1961)	3rd U.S. Ambassador to the UN (1953–1960)
Campaign

==== Republican candidates ====
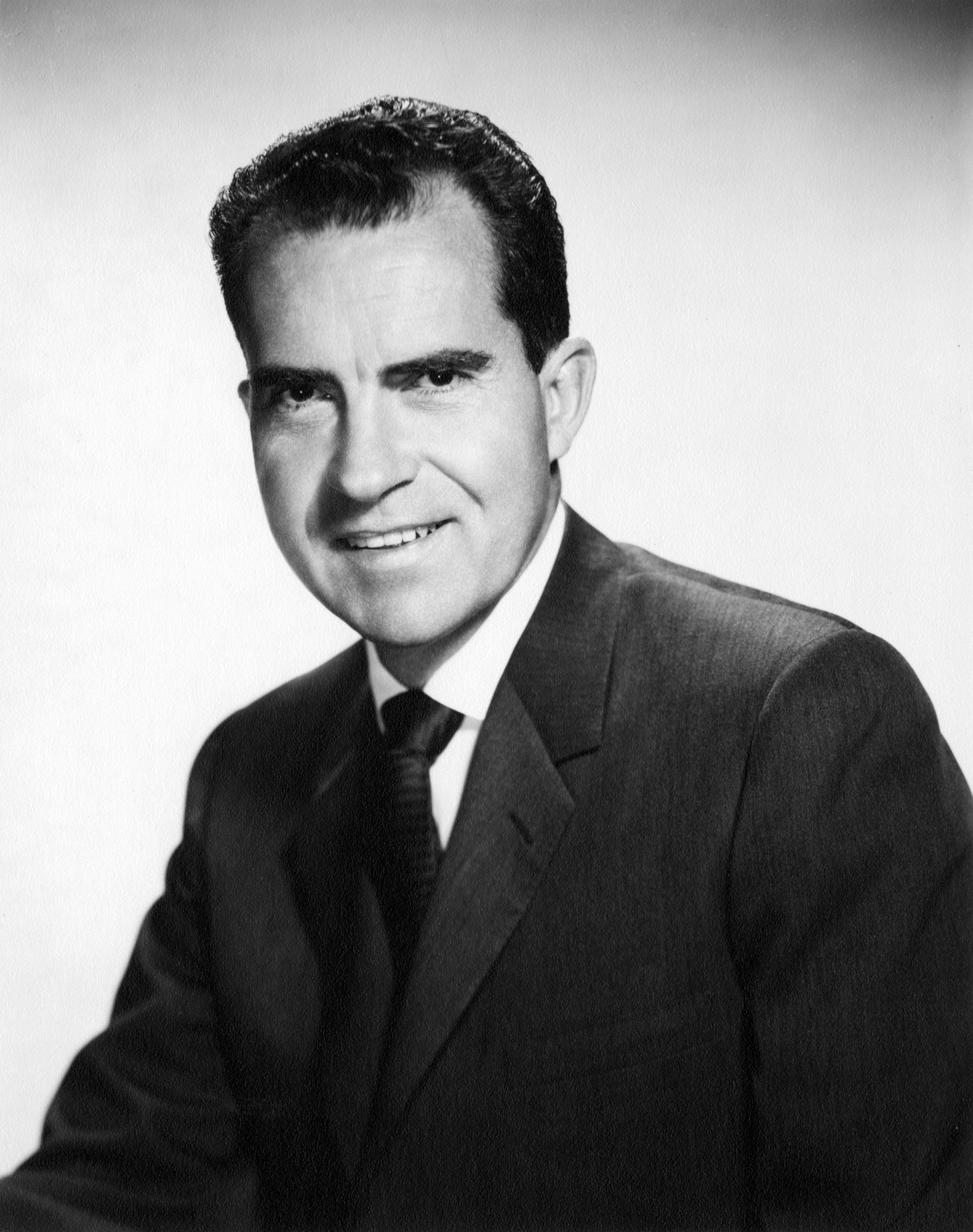
Vice President Richard Nixon

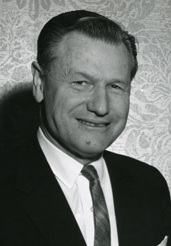
Governor Nelson Rockefeller of New York

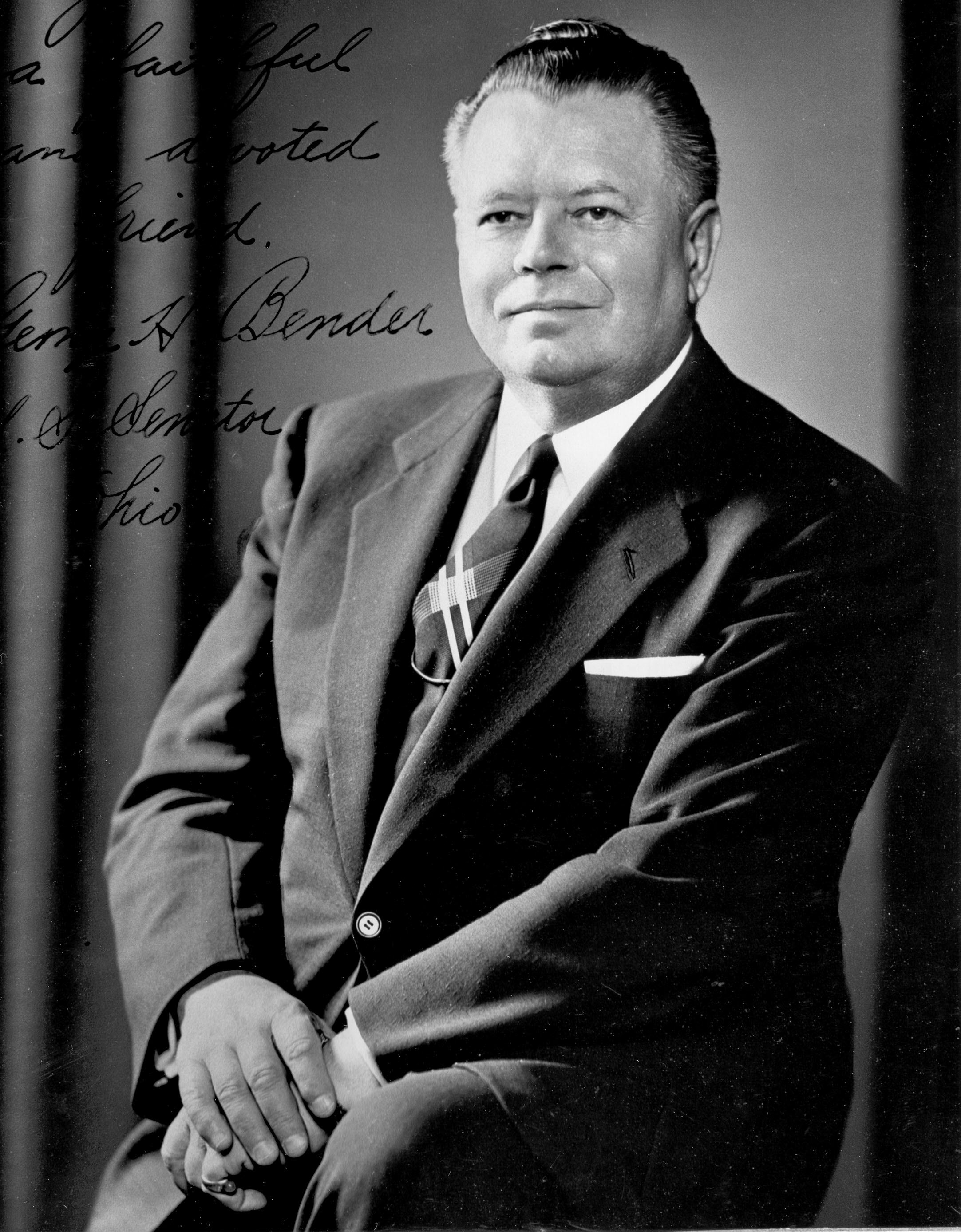
Former Senator George H. Bender from Ohio

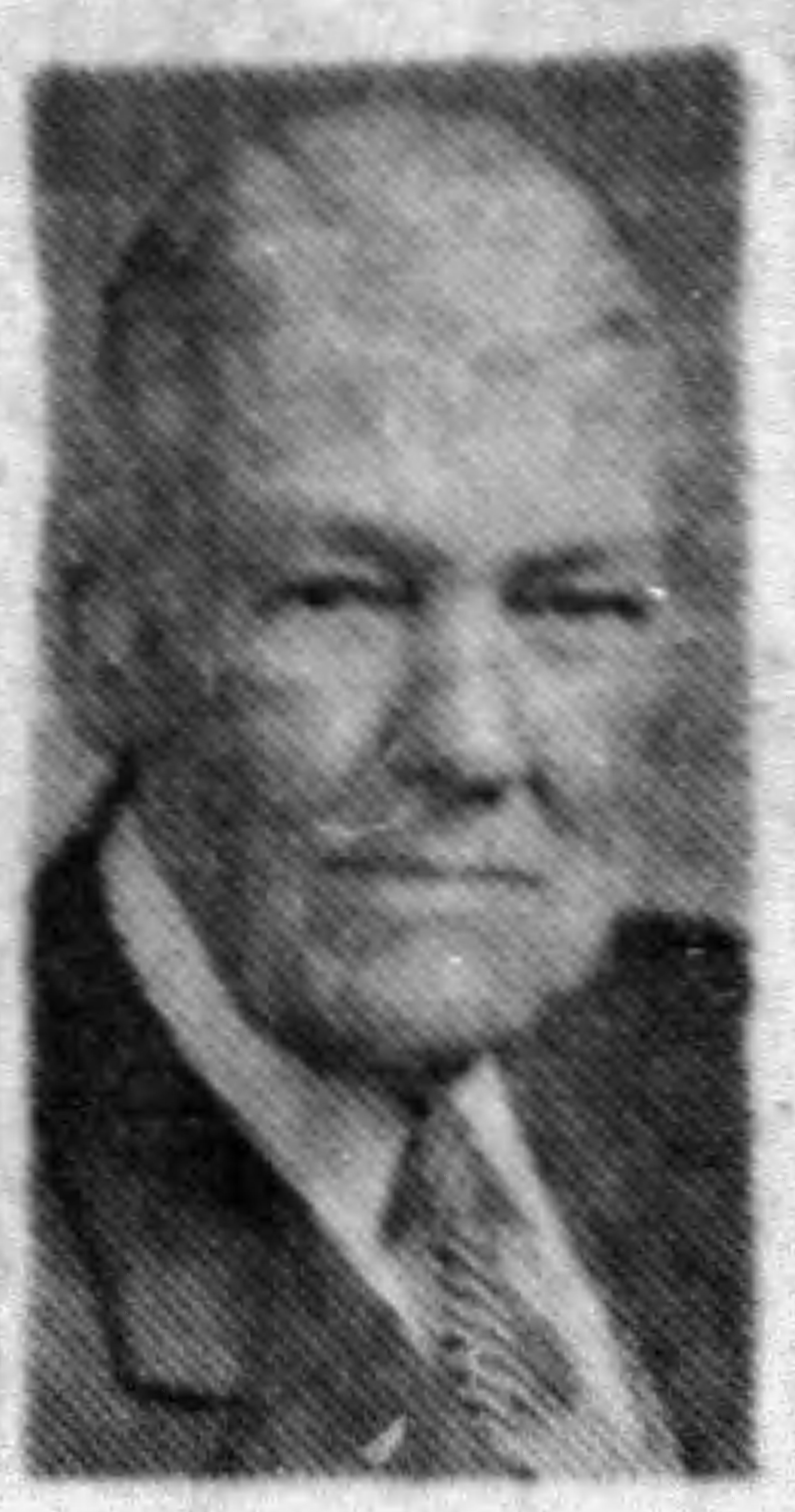
State Senator James M. Lloyd from South Dakota

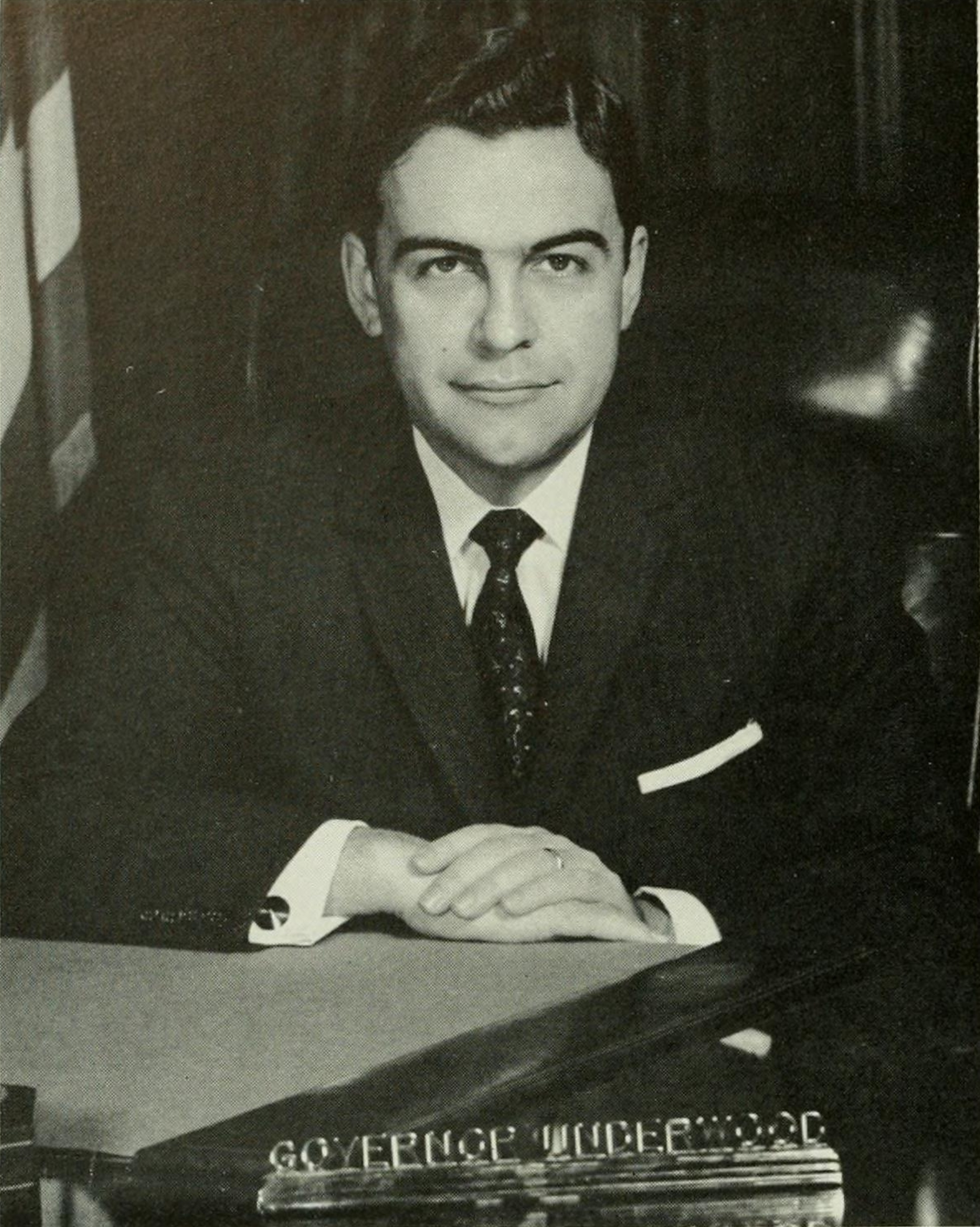
Governor Cecil H. Underwood of West Virginia

With the ratification of the 22nd Amendment in 1951, President Dwight D. Eisenhower could not run for the office of president again; he was elected in 1952 and 1956.

In 1959, it looked as if Vice President Richard Nixon might face a serious challenge for the Republican nomination from New York Governor Nelson Rockefeller, the leader of the Republican moderate-to-liberal wing. However, Rockefeller announced that he would not be a candidate for president, after a national tour revealed that the great majority of Republicans favored Nixon.

After Rockefeller's withdrawal, Nixon faced no significant opposition for the Republican nomination. At the 1960 Republican National Convention in Chicago, Nixon was the overwhelming choice of the delegates, with conservative Senator Barry Goldwater from Arizona receiving 10 votes from conservative delegates. In earning the nomination, Nixon became the first sitting vice president to be nominated for president since John C. Breckinridge exactly a century prior. Nixon then chose former Massachusetts Senator and United Nations Ambassador Henry Cabot Lodge Jr., as his vice presidential running mate. Nixon chose Lodge because his foreign-policy credentials fit into Nixon's strategy to campaign more on foreign policy than domestic policy, which he believed favored the Democrats. Nixon had previously sought Rockefeller as his running mate, but the governor had no ambitions to be vice president. However, he later served as Gerald Ford's vice president from 1974 to 1977.

== General election ==
=== Polling ===
Poll source	Date(s) administered	John Kennedy (D)	Richard Nixon (R)	Other	Undecided	Margin
Election Results	November 8, 1960	49.72%	49.55%	0.73%	-	0.17
Gallup	Oct. 30-Nov. 4, 1960	49%	48%	-	3%	1
Roper	October 24, 1960	48.5%	47.5%	-	4%	1
Gallup	October 18–23, 1960	49%	45%	-	6%	4
Gallup	Sep. 28-Oct. 2, 1960	49%	46%	-	5%	3
Gallup	September 9–14, 1960	46%	47%	-	7%	1
Gallup	August 25–30, 1960	48%	47%	-	5%	1
Gallup	August 11–16, 1960	47%	47%	-	8%	Tied
Gallup	Jul. 30-Aug. 4, 1960	44%	50%	-	6%	6
July 25–28: Republican National Convention
July 11–15: Democratic National Convention
Gallup	June 16–21, 1960	50%	46%	-	4%	4
Gallup	May 26–31, 1960	47%	49%	-	4%	1
Gallup	Apr. 28, May 3, 1960	48%	47%	-	5%	1
Gallup	Mar. 30, Apr. 4, 1960	54%	46%	-	(Note: Only Kennedy and Nixon voters were accounted for in the source, not Undecided.)	8
Gallup	March 2–7, 1960	50%	45%	-	5%	5
Gallup	February 4–9, 1960	48%	48%	-	4%	Tied
Gallup	January 6–11, 1960	43%	48%	-	9%	5
Gallup	November 12–17, 1959	43%	48%	-	9%	5
Gallup	July 23–28, 1959	48%	45%	-	7%	3
Gallup	November 7–12, 1958	54%	38%	-	8%	16
Gallup	April 16–21, 1958	51%	49%	-	-	2
Gallup	January 2–7, 1958	49%	38%	-	13%	11
Gallup	Jun. 27-Jul. 2, 1957	48%	43%	-	9%	5

=== Campaign promises ===
The issue of the Cold War dominated the election, as tensions were high between the United States and the Soviet Union. During the campaign, Kennedy charged that, under Eisenhower and the Republicans, the nation had militarily and economically fallen behind the Soviet Union in the Cold War. Kennedy pledged, if elected, he would "get America moving again". While the Eisenhower administration had established NASA in 1958, Kennedy also claimed the Republican Party had ignored the need to catch up to the Soviet Union in the Space Race. He promised that the new Democratic administration would fully appreciate the importance of space accomplishments for the national security and international prestige of the United States. Nixon responded that, if elected, he would continue the "peace and prosperity" that Eisenhower had brought the nation in the 1950s. Nixon also argued, with the nation engaged in the Cold War, he was more qualified to be president because of his greater political experience and that Kennedy was "too young and inexperienced" to be trusted with the presidency. Conversely, Nixon and Kennedy were only removed by four years in age. In spite of attacks, the Kennedy campaign made Kennedy's youthfulness, and his promise to bring about change, an asset. Kennedy had a slogan, reading, "who's seasoned through and through/but not so dog-gone seasoned that he won't try something new." He was also endorsed by celebrities such as Frank Sinatra, Henry Fonda, and Harry Belafonte.

=== Campaign events ===
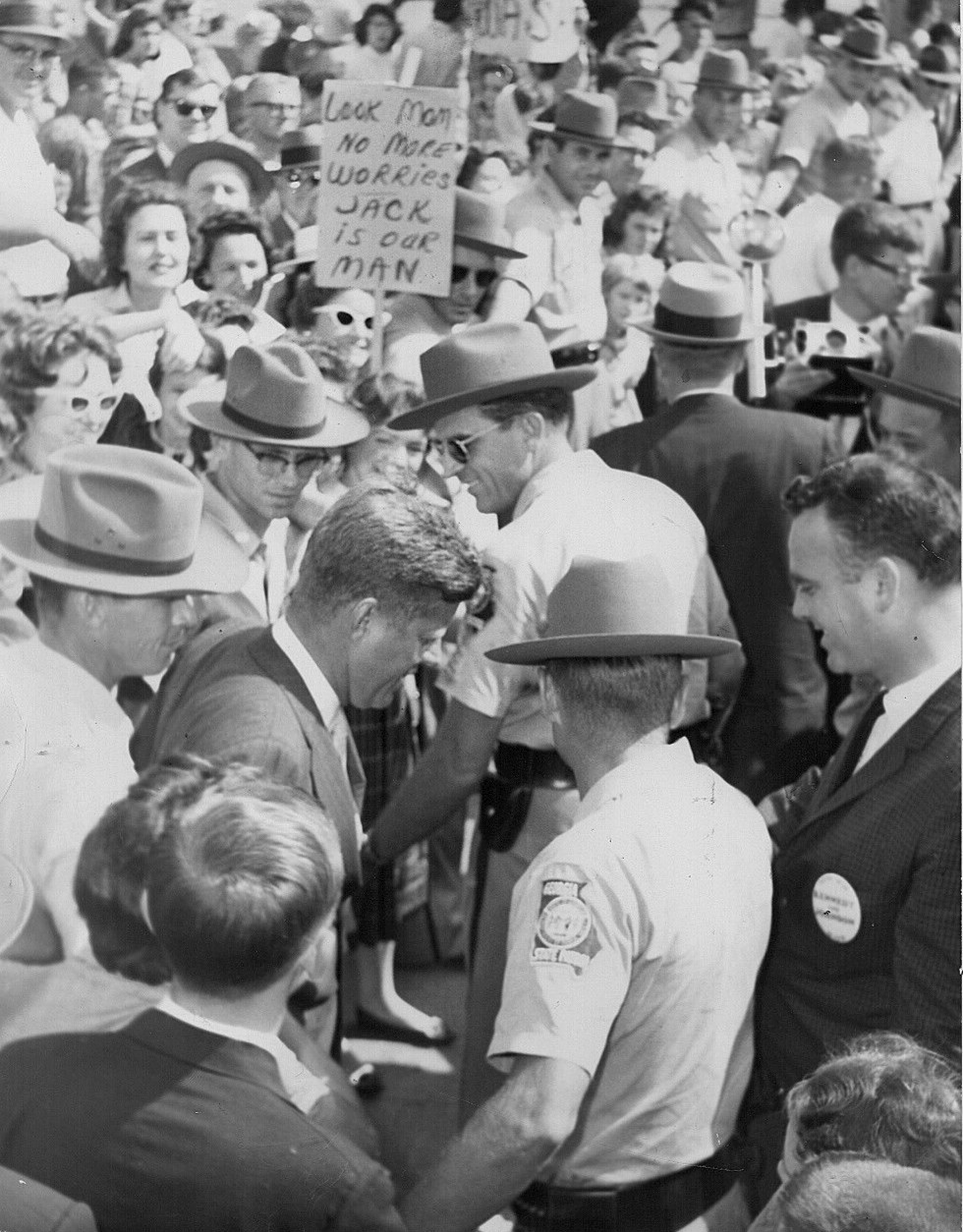
Kennedy campaigning in LaGrange, Georgia, October 1960

Kennedy and Nixon both drew large and enthusiastic crowds throughout the campaign. In August 1960, most polls gave Nixon a slim lead over Kennedy, and many political pundits regarded him as the favorite to win. However, Nixon was plagued with troubles throughout the fall campaign. In August, President Eisenhower, who had long been ambivalent about Nixon, held a televised press conference in which a reporter, Charles Mohr of Time, mentioned Nixon's claims that he had been a valuable administration insider and adviser. Mohr asked Eisenhower if he could give an example of a major idea of Nixon's that he had heeded. Eisenhower responded with the flip comment, "If you give me a week, I might think of one." Although both Eisenhower and Nixon later claimed that he was merely joking with the reporter, the remark hurt Nixon, as it undercut his claims of having greater decision-making experience than Kennedy. The remark proved so damaging to Nixon that the Democrats turned Eisenhower's statement into a television commercial.

At the Republican National Convention, Nixon pledged to campaign in all fifty states. This pledge backfired when, in August, Nixon injured his knee on a car door, while campaigning in North Carolina. The knee became infected, and Nixon had to cease campaigning for two weeks, while the infection was treated with antibiotics. When he left Walter Reed Hospital, Nixon refused to abandon his pledge to visit every state; he thus wasted valuable time visiting states that he had no chance of winning, that had few electoral votes and would be of little help at the election, or states that he would almost certainly win regardless. In his effort to visit all 50 states, Nixon spent the vital weekend before the election campaigning in Alaska, which had only three electoral votes, while Kennedy campaigned in more populous states such as New Jersey, Ohio, Michigan, and Pennsylvania.

Nixon visited Atlanta on August 26 and acquired a very large turnout to his event. He rode through a parade in Atlanta, and was greeted by 150,000 people. Nixon mentioned in his speech in Atlanta, "In the last quarter of a century, there hasn't been a Democratic candidate for President that has bothered to campaign in the State of Georgia." However, Kennedy would not let Nixon take the Democratic states that easily. Kennedy had to change that statistic and visited some surprising states including Georgia. He visited the cities of Columbus, Warm Springs, and LaGrange on his campaign trail in Georgia. In his visit to Warm Springs, state troopers tried to keep Kennedy from an immense crowd; however, Kennedy reached out to shake hands of those who were sick with polio. He visited small towns across Georgia and saw a total of about 100,000 people in the state. Kennedy also spoke at a rehabilitation facility in Warm Springs. Warm Springs was near and dear to Kennedy's heart, due to the effects the facility had on Franklin D. Roosevelt. Roosevelt spent time at the rehabilitation facility, and died there in 1945.

In Warm Springs, Kennedy spoke to supporters at the facility, and mentioned Roosevelt in his speech. He admired Roosevelt, and commended him for sticking up for the farmers, workers, small towns, big cities, those in poverty, and those who were sick. He said Roosevelt had a "spirit of strength and progress, to get America moving". Kennedy discussed his six-point plan for health care. Kennedy proposed: setting up a medical program for retirement, federal funding for the construction of medical schools and hospitals, government loans for students to attend medical school, providing grants to renovate old hospitals, more spending on medical research and, finally, expanding effort for rehabilitation and finding new ways to assist those in need. Many Republicans disapproved of Kennedy's plan and described it as an "appeal to socialism". Nevertheless, many residents of Warm Springs were supportive of Kennedy, with women wearing hats reading "Kennedy and Johnson" and signs around the town saying "Douglas County For Kennedy, Except 17 Republicans 6 Old Grouches". Joe O. Butts, the mayor of Warm Springs during Kennedy's visit, said: "He must've shaken hands with everybody within two miles of him, and he was smiling all the time."

Despite the reservations Robert F. Kennedy had about Johnson's nomination, choosing Johnson as Kennedy's running mate proved to be a master stroke. Johnson vigorously campaigned for Kennedy, and was instrumental in helping the Democrats to carry several Southern states skeptical of him, especially Johnson's home state of Texas. Johnson made a "last-minute change of plans, and scheduled two 12-minute whistle-stop speeches in Georgia". One of these visits included stopping in Atlanta to speak from the rear of a train at Terminal Station. In contrast, Ambassador Lodge, Nixon's running mate, ran a lethargic campaign and made several mistakes that hurt Nixon. Among them was a pledge, made without approval, that Nixon would name at least one African American to a Cabinet post. Nixon was furious at Lodge and accused him of spending too much time campaigning with minority groups instead of the white majority.

Nixon was endorsed by 731 English-language newspapers while Kennedy was endorsed by 208. This was the largest amount of endorsements for a Democratic presidential candidate since 1932.

=== Debates ===
There were four presidential debates and no vice presidential debates during the 1960 general election.

Debates among candidates for the 1960 U.S. presidential election
No.	Date	Host	Location	Panelists	Moderator	Participants	Viewership (millions)
P1	Monday, September 26, 1960	WBBM-TV	Chicago, Illinois	Sander Vanocur; Charles Warren; Stuart Novins	Howard K. Smith	Senator John F. Kennedy; Vice President Richard Nixon	66.4
P2	Friday, October 7, 1960	WRC-TV	Washington, D.C.	Paul Niven; Edward P. Morgan; Alan Spivak; Harold R. Levy	Frank McGee	Senator John F. Kennedy; Vice President Richard Nixon	61.9
P3	Thursday, October 13, 1960	ABC Studios Los Angeles (Nixon)	Los Angeles, California	Frank McGee; Charles Van Fremd; Douglass Cater; Roscoe Drummond	Bill Shadel	Senator John F. Kennedy; Vice President Richard Nixon	63.7
P3	Thursday, October 13, 1960	ABC Studios New York (Kennedy)	New York City	Frank McGee; Charles Van Fremd; Douglass Cater; Roscoe Drummond	Bill Shadel	Senator John F. Kennedy; Vice President Richard Nixon	63.7
P4	Friday, October 21, 1960	ABC Studios New York	New York City	Frank Singiser; John Edwards; Walter Cronkite; John Chancellor	Quincy Howe	Senator John F. Kennedy; Vice President Richard Nixon	60.4

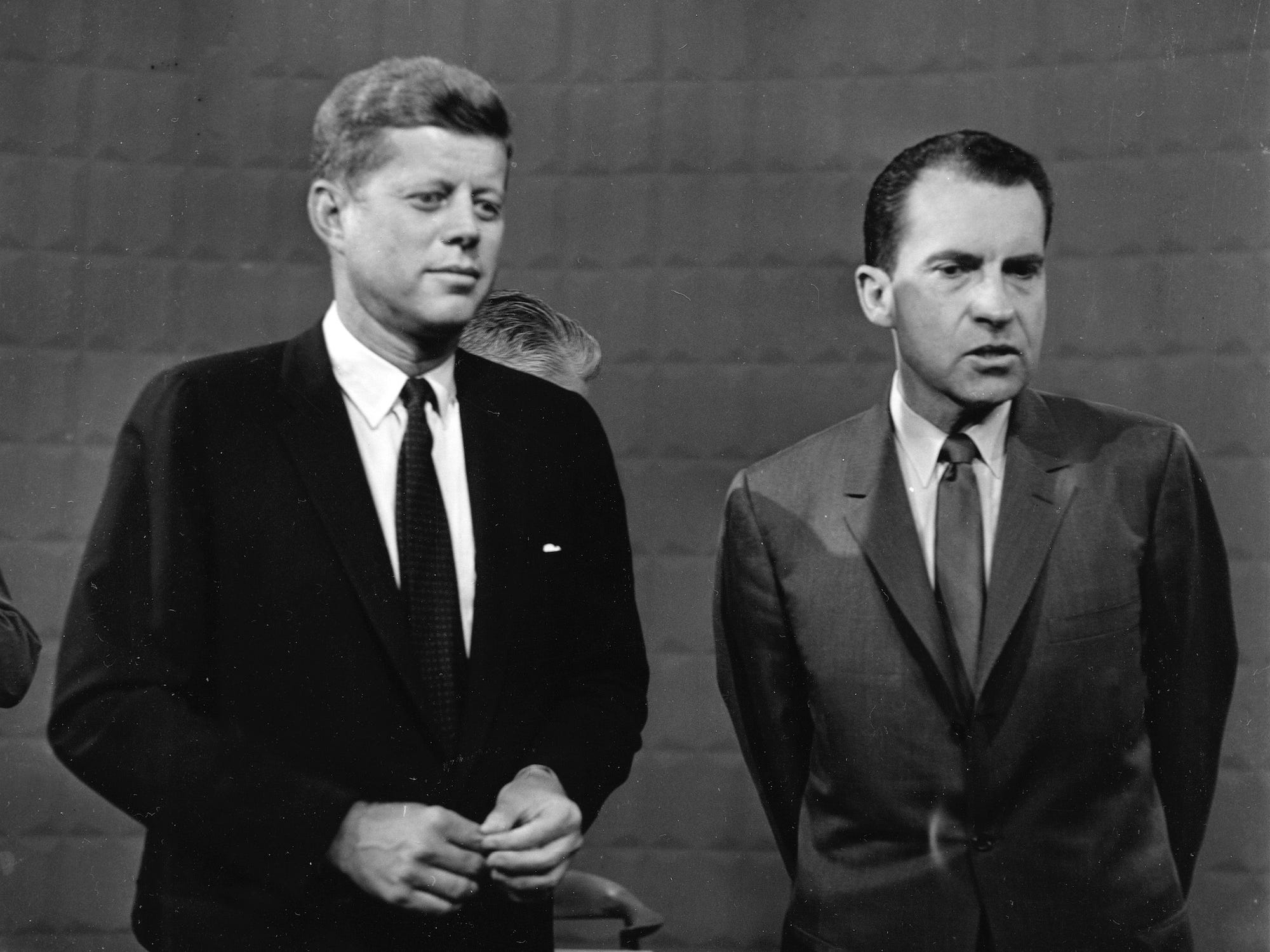
Senator John F. Kennedy (left) and vice president Richard Nixon (right), prior to their first presidential debate.

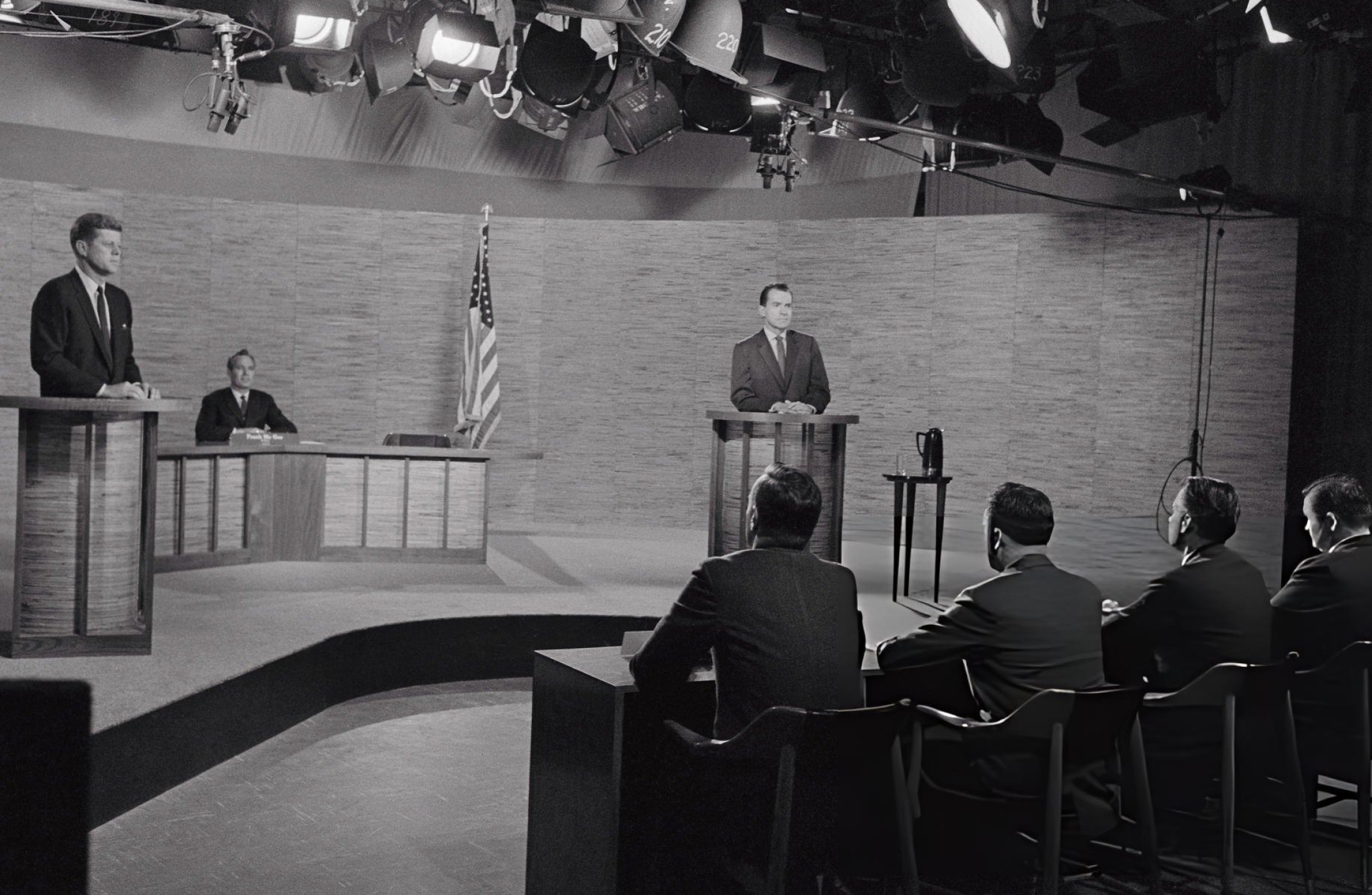
Second of the four Kennedy and Nixon debates, which took place at WRC-TV in Washington, D. C., on October 7, 1960

Full broadcast of the September 26 debate

The key turning point of the campaign came with the four Kennedy-Nixon debates; they were the first presidential debates ever (the Lincoln–Douglas debates of 1858 had been the first for senators from Illinois), also the first held on television and thus attracted enormous publicity. Nixon insisted on campaigning until just a few hours before the first debate started. He had not completely recovered from his stay in hospital, and thus looked pale, sickly, under-weight, and tired. His eyes moved across the room during the debate, and at various moments, sweat was visible on his face. He also refused make-up for the first debate, and as a result, his facial stubble showed prominently on black-and-white TV screens. Furthermore, the debate set appeared darker once the paint dried up, causing Nixon's suit color to blend in with the background, reducing his stature. Nixon's poor appearance on television in the first debate was reflected by the fact that his mother called him immediately following the debate to ask if he was sick. Kennedy, by contrast, rested and prepared extensively beforehand and thus appeared tanned, (Note: His tanned appearance was likely darkening hyper-pigmentation of the skin due to Addison's disease.) confident, and relaxed during the debate. Some estimated that 70 million viewers watched the first debate, although The Commission on Presidential Debates cites lower numbers.

It is often claimed that people who watched the debate on television overwhelmingly believed Kennedy had won, while radio listeners (a smaller audience) thought Nixon had ended up defeating him. However, that has been disputed. Indeed, one study has speculated that the viewer/listener disagreement could be due to sample bias, in that those without TV could be a skewed subset of the population:

Evidence in support of this belief [i. e., that Kennedy's physical appearance over-shadowed his performance during the first debate] is mainly limited to sketchy reports about a market survey, conducted by Sindlinger & Company, in which 49% of those who listened to the debates on radio said Nixon had won, compared to 21% naming Kennedy, while 30% of those who watched the debates on television said Kennedy had won, compared to 29% naming Nixon. Contrary to popular belief, the Sindlinger evidence suggests not that Kennedy won on television, but that the candidates tied on television, while Nixon won on radio. However, no details about the sample have ever been reported, and it is unclear whether the survey results can be generalized to a larger population. Moreover, since 87% of American households had a television in 1960 [and that the] fraction of Americans lacking access to television in 1960 was concentrated in rural areas, and particularly in southern and western states, places that were unlikely to hold significant proportions of Catholic voters.

Nonetheless, Gallup polls in October 1960 showed Kennedy moving into a slight but consistent lead over Nixon after the candidates were in a statistical tie for most of August and September. For the remaining three debates, Nixon regained his lost weight, wore television make-up, and appeared more forceful than in his initial appearance.

Political observers at the time felt that Kennedy won the first debate, Nixon won the second and third debates, while the fourth debate, which was seen as the strongest performance by both men, was a draw.

The third debate has been noted, as it brought about a change in the debate process. This debate was a monumental step for television. For the first time ever, split-screen technology was used to bring two people from opposite sides of the country together so they were able to converse in real time. Nixon was in Los Angeles, while Kennedy was in New York. The men appeared to be in the same room, thanks to identical sets. Both candidates had monitors in their respective studios, containing the feed from the opposite studio, so that they could respond to questions. Bill Shadel moderated the debate from a different television studio in Los Angeles. The main topic of this debate was whether military force should be used to prevent Quemoy and Matsu, two island archipelagos off the Chinese coast, from falling under Communist control.

=== Campaign issues ===
A key concern in Kennedy's campaign was the widespread skepticism among Protestants about his Roman Catholic religion. Some Protestants, especially Southern Baptists and Lutherans, feared that having a Catholic in the White House would give undue influence to the Pope in the nation's affairs. Radio evangelists such as G. E. Lowman wrote that, "Each person has the right to their own religious belief ... [but] ... the Roman Catholic ecclesiastical system demands the first allegiance of every true member, and says in a conflict between church and state, the church must prevail". The religious issue was so significant that Kennedy made a speech before the nation's newspaper editors in which he criticized the prominence they gave to the religious issue over other topics—especially in foreign policy—that he felt were of greater importance.

To address fears among Protestants that his Roman Catholicism would impact his decision-making, Kennedy told the Greater Houston Ministerial Association on September 12, 1960: "I am not the Catholic candidate for president. I am the Democratic Party's candidate for president who also happens to be a Catholic. I do not speak for my Church on public matters—and the Church does not speak for me." He promised to respect the separation of church and state, and not to allow Catholic officials to dictate public policy to him. Kennedy also raised the question of whether one-quarter of Americans were relegated to second-class citizenship just because they were Roman Catholic. Kennedy would become the first Roman Catholic to be elected president—it would be 60 years before another Roman Catholic, Joe Biden, was elected.

Kennedy's campaign took advantage of an opening when Rev. Martin Luther King Jr., the civil-rights leader, was arrested in Georgia while taking part in a sit-in. Nixon asked President Dwight D. Eisenhower to intervene, but the President declined to do so (as the matter was under state jurisdiction, the President did not have the power to pardon King). Nixon refused to take further action, but Kennedy placed calls to local political authorities to get King released from jail, and he also called King's father and wife. As a result, King's father endorsed Kennedy, and he received much favorable publicity among the black electorate. A letter to the Governor of Georgia regarding Martin Luther King Jr.'s, arrest also helped Kennedy garner many African American votes. John F. Kennedy asked Governor Ernest Vandiver to look into the harsh sentencing, and stated his claim that he did not want to have to get involved in Georgia's justice system. A member of Kennedy's civil rights team and King's friend, Harris Wofford, and other Kennedy campaign members passed out a pamphlet to black churchgoers the Sunday before the presidential election that said, "'No Comment' Nixon versus a Candidate with a Heart, Senator Kennedy." On election day, Kennedy won the black vote in most areas by wide margins, and that could have contributed to his margin of victory in states like New Jersey, South Carolina, Illinois, and Missouri. Researchers found that Kennedy's appeal to African American voters appears to be largely responsible for his receiving more African-American votes than Adlai Stevenson in the 1956 election. The same study conducted found that white voters were less influenced on the topic of civil rights than black voters in 1960. The Republican national chairman at the time, Thruston Ballard Morton, regarded the African-American vote as the single most crucial factor.

The issue that dominated the election was the rising Cold War tensions between the United States and the Soviet Union. In 1957, the Soviets had launched Sputnik, the first man-made satellite to orbit Earth. Soon afterwards, some American leaders warned that the nation was falling behind communist countries in science and technology. In Cuba, the revolutionary regime of Fidel Castro became a close ally of the Soviet Union in 1960, heightening fears of communist subversion in the Western Hemisphere. Public opinion polls revealed that more than half the American people thought that war with the Soviet Union was inevitable.

Kennedy took advantage of increased Cold War tension by emphasizing a perceived "missile gap" between the United States and Soviet Union. He argued that under the Republicans, the Soviets had developed a major advantage in the numbers of nuclear missiles. He proposed a bi-partisan congressional investigation about the possibility that the Soviet Union was ahead of the United States in developing missiles. He also noted in an October 18 speech that several senior US military officers had long criticized the Eisenhower Administration's defense spending policies.

Both candidates also argued about the economy and ways in which they could increase the economic growth and prosperity of the 1950s, and make it accessible to more people (especially minorities). Some historians criticize Nixon for not taking greater advantage of Eisenhower's popularity (which was around 60–65% throughout 1960 and on election day), and for not discussing the prosperous economy of the Eisenhower presidency more often in his campaign. As the campaign moved into the final two weeks, the polls and most political pundits predicted a Kennedy victory. However, President Eisenhower, who had largely sat out the campaign, made a vigorous campaign tour for Nixon over the last 10 days before the election. Eisenhower's support gave Nixon a badly needed boost. Nixon criticized Kennedy for saying that Quemoy and Matsu, two small islands off the coast of Communist China which were held by Nationalist Chinese forces based in Taiwan, were outside the treaty of protection the United States had signed with the Nationalist Chinese. Nixon claimed the islands were included in the treaty, and accused Kennedy of showing weakness towards Communist aggression. Aided by the Quemoy and Matsu issue, and by Eisenhower's support, Nixon began to gain momentum, and by election day, the polls indicated a virtual tie.

== Results ==
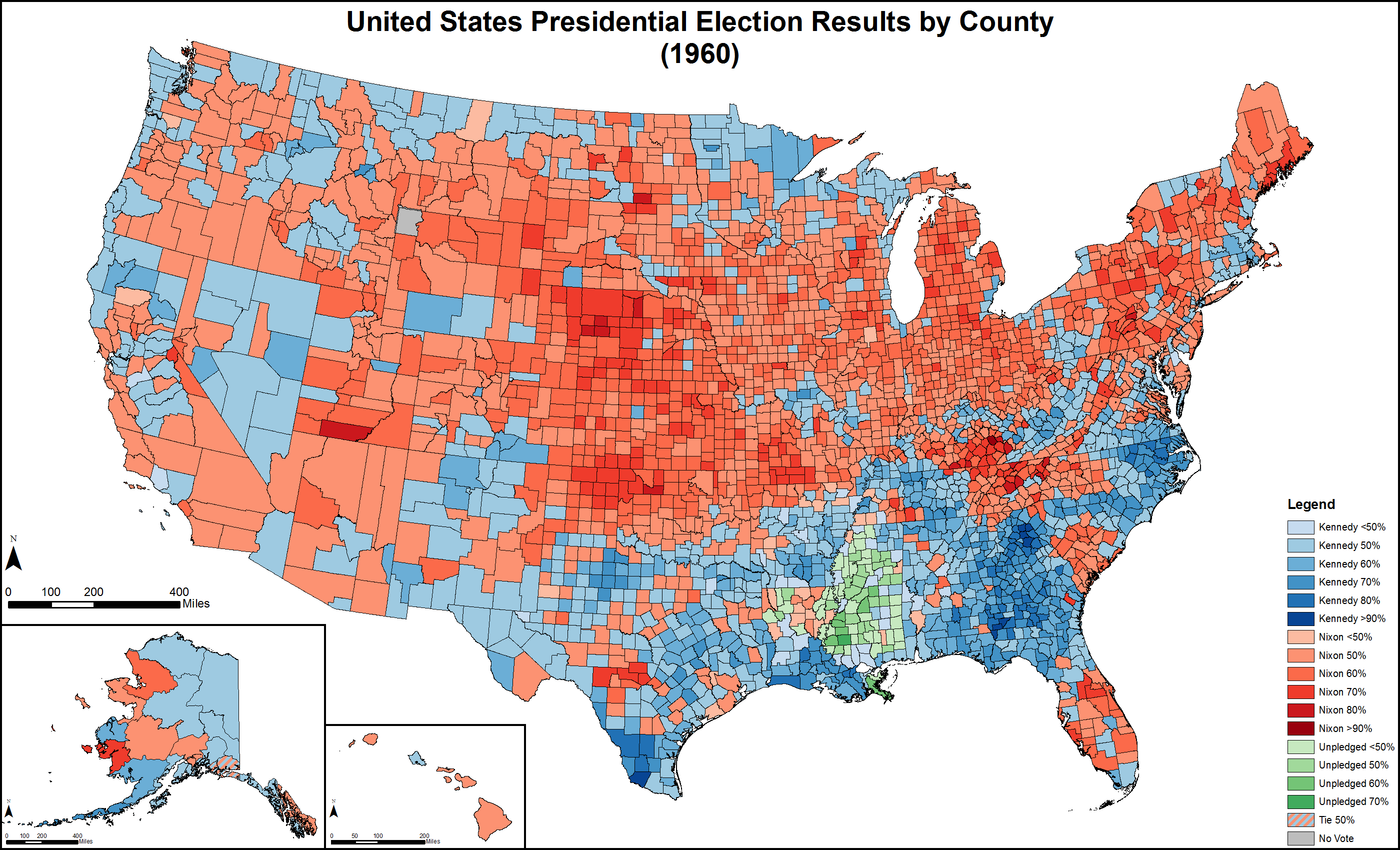
Results by county explicitly indicating the percentage for the winning candidate. Shades of blue are for Kennedy (Democratic), shades of red are for Nixon (Republican), and shades of green are for Unpledged electors (Democratic/States' Rights).

Results by congressional district

The election was held on November 8, 1960. Nixon watched the election returns from his suite at the Ambassador Hotel in Los Angeles, while Kennedy watched them at the Kennedy Compound in Hyannis Port, Massachusetts. As the early returns poured in from large Northeastern and Midwestern cities including Boston, New York City, Philadelphia, Pittsburgh, Cleveland, Detroit, and Chicago, Kennedy opened a large lead in the popular and electoral votes, and appeared headed for victory. However, as later returns came in from rural and suburban areas in the Midwest, the Rocky Mountain states, and the Pacific Coast states, Nixon began to steadily close the gap on Kennedy.

Before midnight, The New York Times had gone to press with the headline, "Kennedy Elected President". As the election again became too close to call, Times managing editor Turner Catledge hoped that, as he recalled in his memoirs, "a certain Midwestern mayor would steal enough votes to pull Kennedy through", thus allowing the Times to avoid the embarrassment of announcing the wrong winner, as the Chicago Tribune had memorably done twelve years earlier in announcing that Thomas E. Dewey had defeated President Harry S. Truman.

Nixon made a speech at about 3 a.m., and hinted that Kennedy might have won the election. News reporters were puzzled, as it was not a formal concession speech. He talked about how Kennedy would be elected if "the present trend continues". It was not until the afternoon of the next day that Nixon finally conceded the election, and Kennedy claimed his victory.

Kennedy won in twenty-seven of the thirty-nine largest cities. Although he maintained Atlanta, New Orleans, and San Antonio, he lost in other Southern cities that had voted for Adlai Stevenson II. New Orleans and San Antonio were the only cities in the Southern United States to have large Catholic populations and Atlanta was a traditional Democratic stronghold. Of the 3,129 counties and county-equivalents making returns, Nixon won in 1,857 (59.35%), while Kennedy carried 1,200 (38.35%). "Unpledged" electors came first in 71 counties and parishes (2.27%) throughout Mississippi and Louisiana, and one borough (0.03%) in Alaska split evenly between Kennedy and Nixon. The Kennedy-Johnson ticket was the first successful all Senator ticket, which would only be replicated in 2008.

This election marked the beginning of a decisive realignment in the Democratic presidential coalition; whereas Democrats had until this point relied on dominating in Southern states to win the Electoral College, Kennedy managed to win without carrying a number of these states. As such, this marked the first election in history in which a Republican candidate carried any of Oklahoma, Tennessee, Kentucky, Florida, Virginia, or Idaho without winning the presidency, and the first time since statehood that Arizona backed any losing candidate in a presidential election. This in many ways foreshadowed the results of subsequent elections, in which Democratic candidates from northern states would rely on their performance in the northeast and midwest to win, while Republican candidates would rely on success in the former Solid South and the Mountain West. This is the last time a Democrat won without Wisconsin.

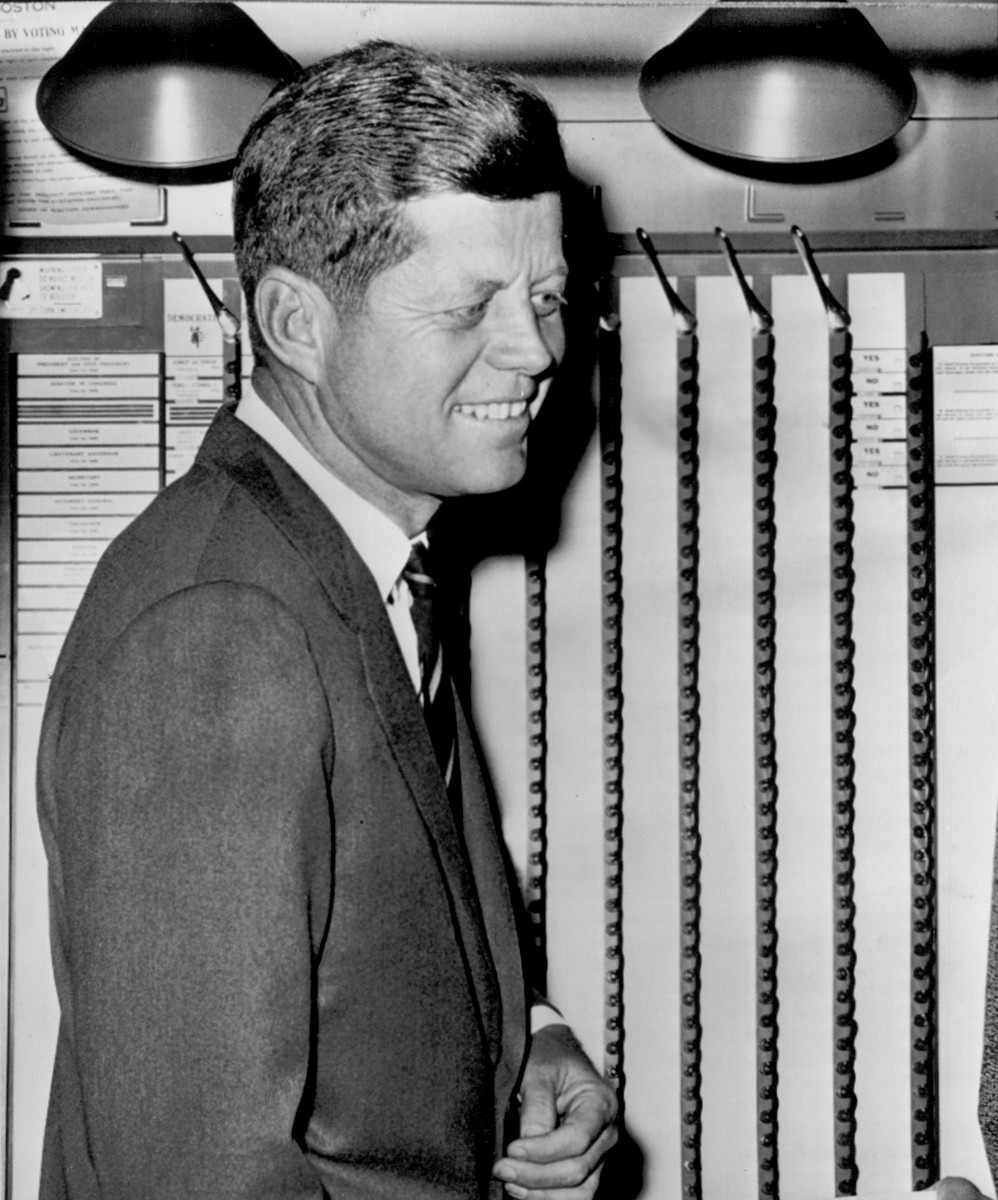
Kennedy casts his ballot at his polling place at a branch of the Boston Public Library.

A sample of how close the election was can be seen in California, Nixon's home state. Kennedy seemed to have carried the state by 37,000 votes when all of the voting precincts reported, but when the absentee ballots were counted a week later, Nixon came from behind to win the state by 36,000 votes.

Similarly, in Hawaii, official results showed Nixon winning by a small margin of 141 votes, with the state being called for him early Wednesday morning. Acting Governor James Kealoha certified the Republican electors, and they cast Hawaii's three electoral votes for Nixon. However, clear discrepancies existed in the official electoral tabulations, and Democrats petitioned for a recount in Hawaii circuit court. The court challenge was still ongoing at the time of the Electoral Count Act's safe harbor deadline, but Democratic electors still convened at the ʻIolani Palace on the constitutionally-mandated date of December 19 and cast their votes for Kennedy. The recount, completed before Christmas, resulted in Kennedy being declared winner by 115 votes. On December 30, the circuit court ruled that Hawaii's three electoral votes should go to Kennedy. It was decided that a new certificate was necessary, with only two days remaining before Congress convened on January 6, 1961, to count and certify the Electoral College votes. A letter to Congress saying a certificate was on the way was rushed out by registered air mail. Both Democratic and Republican electoral votes from Hawaii were presented for counting on January 6, 1961, and Vice President Nixon, who presided over the certification, graciously said "without the intent of establishing a precedent" and requested unanimous consent that the Democratic votes for Kennedy be counted.

In the national popular vote, Kennedy beat Nixon by less than two-tenths of one percentage point (0.17%), the closest popular-vote margin of the 20th century. So close was the popular vote that a shift of 18,838 votes in Illinois and Missouri, both won by Kennedy by less than 1%, would have left both Kennedy and Nixon short of the 269 electoral votes required to win, thus forcing a contingent election in the House of Representatives. Furthermore, had all five of the states Kennedy won by a margin of less than 1% (Hawaii, Illinois, Missouri, New Jersey, and New Mexico) been won by Nixon instead, the latter would have won the election with 282 electoral votes.

In the Electoral College, Kennedy's victory was larger, as he took 303 electoral votes, to Nixon's 219. A total of 15 electors–eight from Mississippi, six from Alabama, and one from Oklahoma–all refused to vote for either Kennedy or Nixon, and instead cast their votes for Senator Harry F. Byrd of Virginia, a conservative Democrat, even though he had not been a candidate for president. Kennedy carried 12 states by three percentage points or less, while Nixon won six by similarly narrow margins. Kennedy carried all but three states in the populous Northeast, and he also carried the large states of Michigan, Illinois, and Missouri in the Midwest. With Lyndon Johnson's help, he also carried most of the South, including the large states of North Carolina, Georgia, and Texas. Nixon carried all but three of the Western states (including California), and he ran strong in the farm belt states, where his biggest victory was in Ohio.

The New York Times, summarizing the discussion in late November, spoke of a "narrow consensus" among the experts that Kennedy had won more than he lost "as a result of his Catholicism", as Northern Catholics flocked to Kennedy because of attacks on his religion. Interviewing people who voted in both 1956 and 1960, a University of Michigan team analyzing the election returns discovered that people who voted Democratic in 1956 split 33–6 for Kennedy, while the Republican voters of 1956 split 44–17 for Nixon. That is, Nixon lost 28% (17/61) of the Eisenhower voters, while Kennedy lost only 15% of the Stevenson voters. The Democrats, in other words, did a better job of holding their 1956 supporters.

Kennedy said that he saw the challenges ahead and needed the country's support to get through them. In his victory speech, he declared: "To all Americans, I say that the next four years are going to be difficult and challenging years for us all; that a supreme national effort will be needed to move this country safely through the 1960s. I ask your help, and I can assure you that every degree of my spirit that I possess will be devoted to the long-range interest of the United States and to the cause of freedom around the world." That was the last time Ohio voted for the losing candidate until 2020.

The election saw the first time that a candidate won the presidency while carrying fewer states than the other candidate, which would not occur again until 1976.

This was the most recent election in which three of the four major party nominees for president and vice president were eventually elected president. Kennedy won the election, but he later died in an assassination in 1963, and he was succeeded by his vice president, Lyndon B. Johnson. Only the Republican vice-presidential nominee, Henry Cabot Lodge Jr., failed to succeed to the presidency as Nixon later won the 1968 election.

=== Allegations of voter fraud ===
There were widespread allegations of voter fraud, especially in Texas, where Kennedy's running mate Lyndon B. Johnson was Senator, and Illinois, home of Mayor Richard J. Daley's powerful Chicago political machine. The two states were important because if Nixon had won both of them, he would have been elected president with 270 electoral votes, one more than the 269 needed to win the election. Republican senators such as Everett Dirksen and Barry Goldwater claimed voter fraud "played a role in the election", and that Nixon actually won the national popular vote. Earl Mazo, a journalist who was Nixon's biographer, made accusations of voter fraud.

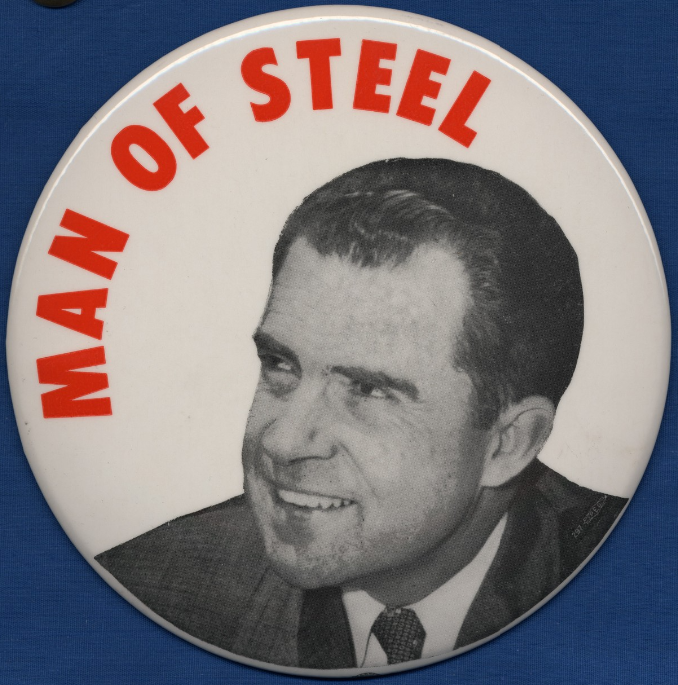
1960 Nixon campaign button

Nixon's campaign staff urged him to pursue recounts and challenge the validity of Kennedy's victory in several states, especially Illinois, Missouri, and New Jersey, where large majorities in Catholic precincts handed Kennedy the election; however, Nixon gave a speech three days after the election, stating that he would not contest the election. The Republican National chairman, Senator Thruston Ballard Morton of Kentucky, visited Key Biscayne, Florida, where Nixon had taken his family for a vacation, and pushed for a recount. Morton challenged the results in 11 states, keeping challenges in the courts into mid-1961, but the only result of these challenges was the loss of Hawaii to Kennedy on a recount. Kennedy won Illinois by less than 9,000 votes, out of 4.75 million cast, a margin of 0.2%. Nixon carried 92 of the state's 101 counties. Kennedy's victory in Illinois came from Chicago, which had favorable demographics for Kennedy, with its large populations of Catholic and African-American voters. His victory margin in the city was 318,736, and 456,312 in Cook County. Daley was alleged to have phoned the Kennedy campaign with the promise "With a little bit of luck and the help of a few close friends, you're going to carry Illinois." When the Republican Chicago Tribune went to press, 79% of Cook County precincts had reported, compared with just 62% of Illinois's precincts overall. Moreover, Nixon never led in Illinois, and Kennedy's lead merely shrank as election night went on.

In Texas, Kennedy defeated Nixon by a 51 to 49% margin, or 46,000 votes. Some Republicans argued that Johnson's formidable political machine had stolen enough votes in counties along the Mexican border to give Kennedy the victory. Kennedy's defenders, such as his speechwriter and special assistant Arthur M. Schlesinger Jr., argued that Kennedy's margin in Texas was simply too large for vote fraud to have been a decisive factor. Earl Mazo, writing in the New York Herald Tribune, argued that in Texas, "a minimum of 100,000 votes for the Kennedy-Johnson ticket simply were nonexistent." Allegations of voter fraud were made in Texas. Fannin County had only 4,895 registered voters yet 6,138 votes were cast in that county, three-quarters for Kennedy. In an Angelina County precinct, Kennedy received 187 votes to Nixon's 24, although there were only 86 registered voters in the precinct. When Republicans demanded a statewide recount, they learned that the state Board of Elections, whose members were all Democrats, had already certified Kennedy as the winner. This analysis has been challenged, since registered voter figures only counted people who had paid the poll tax, and "veterans and senior citizens and some other isolated groups" were exempt from that tax. Mazo reported a voting machine indicated 121 ballots after 43 people voted. In 2000, he told The Washington Post: "There's no question in my mind that it was stolen. It was stolen like mad. It was stolen in Chicago and in Texas."

Illinois was the site of the most extensive challenge process, which fell short, despite repeated efforts spearheaded by Cook County state's attorney Benjamin Adamowski, a Republican, who also lost his re-election bid. Despite demonstrating net errors favoring both Nixon and Adamowski (some precincts, 40% in Nixon's case, showed errors favoring them, a factor suggesting error, rather than fraud), the totals found fell short of reversing the results for the candidates. While a Daley-connected circuit judge, Thomas Kluczynski (later appointed a federal judge by Kennedy, at Daley's recommendation), threw out a federal lawsuit "filed to contend" the voting totals, the Republican-dominated State Board of Elections unanimously rejected the challenge to the results. Furthermore, there were signs of possible irregularities in downstate areas controlled by Republicans, which Democrats never seriously pressed, since the Republican challenges went nowhere. More than a month after the election, the Republican National Committee abandoned its Illinois voter fraud claims. Even if Nixon had carried Illinois, the state would not have given him a victory, for Kennedy would still have won 276 electoral votes, to Nixon's 246.

A special prosecutor assigned to the case brought charges against 650 people but charges were later dropped. Three Chicago election workers were convicted of voter fraud in 1962, and served short terms in jail. Mazo later said that he "found names of the dead who had voted in Chicago, along with 56 people from one house", and told The Washington Post: "There was a cemetery (in Chicago) where the names on the tombstones were registered and voted. I remember a house. It was completely gutted. Nobody was there, but there were 56 votes for Kennedy in that house." He also found cases of Republican voter fraud in southern Illinois but said that the totals "did not match the Chicago fraud he found". After Mazo had published four parts of an intended 12-part voter fraud series documenting his findings, which was re-published nationally, he said: "Nixon requested his publisher stop the rest of the series so as to prevent a constitutional crisis." Nevertheless, the Chicago Tribune, which routinely endorsed GOP presidential candidates, including Nixon in 1960, 1968, and 1972, wrote that "the election of November 8 was characterized by such gross and palpable fraud as to justify the conclusion that [Nixon] was deprived of victory".

An academic study in 1985 later analyzed the ballots of two disputed precincts in Chicago which were subject to a recount. It found that while there was a pattern of miscounting votes to the advantage of Democratic candidates, Nixon suffered less from this than Republicans in other races, and, furthermore, the extrapolated error would only have reduced Kennedy's Illinois margin from 8,858 votes (the final official total) to just under 900. It concluded there was insufficient evidence that he had been cheated out of winning Illinois. Nixon's personal decision not to challenge the electoral results came despite pressure from Eisenhower, his wife Pat, and others. He explained in his memoirs that he did not do it for a number of reasons, one of them being that every state had different electoral laws, and some had no provisions for a vote recount. Consequently, a recount of the votes, if it was even possible, would take months, during which time the nation would be left without a president. Furthermore, Nixon feared that it would set a bad precedent for other countries. In his first autobiography Six Crises, Nixon states:

I could think of no worse example for nations abroad, who for the first time were trying to put free electoral procedures into effect, than that of the United States wrangling over the results of our presidential election, and even suggesting that the presidency itself could be stolen by thievery at the ballot box. It is difficult enough to get defeated candidates in some of the newly independent countries to abide by the verdict of the electorate. If we could not continue to set a good example in this respect in the United States, I could see that there would be open-season for shooting at the validity of free elections throughout the world.

=== Popular votes ===
==== Alabama ====
The situation in Alabama was controversial, as the unusual situation there makes it difficult to determine Kennedy's popular vote. Voters in Alabama chose the state's electors individually, rather than as a block, with each voter selecting as many as 11 candidates. In such a situation, a given candidate is traditionally assigned the popular vote of the elector who received the most votes. For instance, all 11 Republican candidates in Alabama were pledged to Nixon, and the 11 Republican electors received anywhere from as low as 230,951 votes (for George Witcher) to as high as 237,981 votes (for Cecil Durham); Nixon is therefore assigned 237,981 popular votes from Alabama.

The situation was more complicated on the Democratic side. The Alabama statewide Democratic primary had chosen 11 candidates for the Electoral College, five of whom were pledged to vote for Kennedy, but the other six of whom were unpledged and could therefore vote for anyone that they chose to be president. All 11 of these Democratic candidates won in the general election in Alabama, from as low as 316,394 votes for Karl Harrison, to as high as 324,050 votes for Frank M. Dixon. All six of the unpledged Democratic electors ended up voting against Kennedy, and instead voted for the segregationist Harry F. Byrd. The number of popular votes that Kennedy received is therefore difficult to calculate. There are typically three methods that can be used. The first method, which is mostly used and the method used on the results table on this page below, is to assign Kennedy 318,303 votes in Alabama (the votes won by the most popular Kennedy elector, C.G. Allen), and to assign 324,050 votes in Alabama (the votes won by the most popular unpledged Democratic elector, Frank M. Dixon) to unpledged electors. However, using this method gives a combined voting total that is much higher than the actual number of votes cast for the Democrats in Alabama. The second method that can be used is to give Kennedy 318,303 votes in Alabama, and count the remaining 5,747 Democratic votes as unpledged electors.

The third method would give a completely different outlook in terms of the popular vote in both Alabama and in the US overall. The third method is to allocate the Democratic votes in Alabama between Kennedy electors and unpledged electors on a percentage basis, giving 5/11s of the 324,050 Democratic votes to Kennedy (which comes to 147,295 votes for Kennedy) and 6/11s of the 324,050 Democratic votes to unpledged electors (which comes to 176,755 votes for unpledged electors). Bearing in mind that the highest Republican/Nixon elector in Alabama got 237,981 votes, this third method of calculating the Alabama vote means that Nixon wins the popular vote in Alabama, and wins the popular vote in the US overall, as it would give Kennedy 34,049,976 votes nationally, and Nixon 34,108,157 votes nationally.

==== Georgia ====
The number of popular votes Kennedy and Nixon received in Georgia is also difficult to determine because voters voted for 12 separate electors. The vote totals of 458,638 for Kennedy and 274,472 for Nixon reflect the number of votes for the Kennedy and Nixon electors who received the highest number of votes. The Republican and Democratic electors receiving the highest number of votes were outliers from the other 11 electors from their party. The average vote totals for the 12 electors were 455,629 for the Democratic electors, and 273,110 for the Republican electors. This shrinks Kennedy's election margin in Georgia by 1,647 votes, to 182,519.

=== Unpledged Democratic electors ===
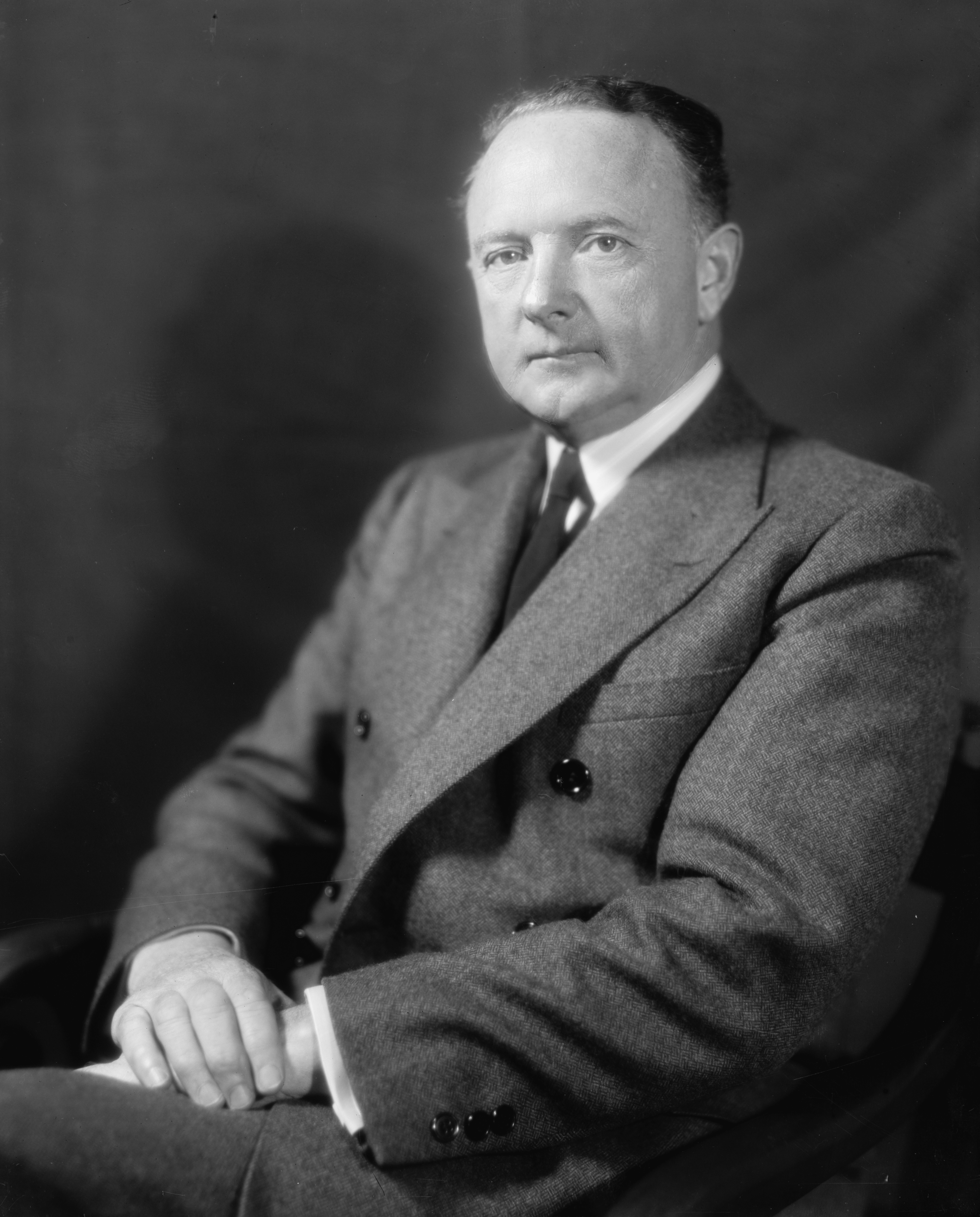
Senator Harry F. Byrd Sr. received 15 electoral votes

Many Southern Democrats were opposed to voting rights for African Americans living in the South. There was a call from segregationists for electoral votes to be withheld, or to be cast for Virginia senator Harry F. Byrd, a segregationist Democrat, as an independent candidate. Both before and after the convention, they attempted to put unpledged Democratic electors on their states' ballots, in the hopes of influencing the race; the existence of such electors might influence which candidate would be chosen by the national convention, and in a close race, such electors might be in a position to extract concessions from either the Democratic or Republican presidential candidates in return for their electoral votes.

Most of these attempts failed. The Democrats in Alabama put up a mixed slate of five electors loyal to Kennedy and six unpledged electors. The Democrats in Mississippi put up two distinct slates—one of Kennedy loyalists, and one of unpledged electors. Louisiana also put up two distinct slates, although the unpledged slate did not receive the "Democratic" label. Georgia freed its Democratic electors from pledges to vote for Kennedy, although all 12 Democratic electors in Georgia did end up voting for Kennedy. Governor Ernest Vandiver wanted the Democratic electors to vote against Kennedy. Former governor Ellis Arnall supported Kennedy getting the electoral votes, with Arnall calling Vandiver's stand "utterly disgraceful".

In total, 14 unpledged Democratic electors won election from the voters and chose not to vote for Kennedy, eight from Mississippi and six from Alabama. Because electors pledged to Kennedy had won a clear majority of the Electoral College, the unpledged electors could not influence the results. Nonetheless, they refused to vote for Kennedy. Instead, they voted for Byrd, even though he was not an announced candidate and did not seek their votes. In addition, Byrd received one electoral vote from a faithless Republican elector in Oklahoma, for a total of 15 electoral votes. The faithless Republican elector in Oklahoma voted for Barry Goldwater as vice president, whereas the 14 unpledged Democratic electors from Mississippi and Alabama voted for Strom Thurmond as vice president.

Electoral results
Presidential candidate	Party	Home state	Popular vote		Electoral vote	Running mate		
Presidential candidate	Party	Home state	Count	Percentage	Electoral vote	Vice-presidential candidate	Home state	Electoral vote
John F. Kennedy	Democratic	Massachusetts	34,220,984^{(a)}	49.72%	303	Lyndon B. Johnson	Texas	303
Richard Nixon	Republican	California	34,108,157	49.55%	219	Henry Cabot Lodge Jr.	Massachusetts	219
Harry F. Byrd	Democratic	Virginia	—^{(b)}	—^{(b)}	15	Strom Thurmond	South Carolina	14
Harry F. Byrd	Democratic	Virginia	—^{(b)}	—^{(b)}	15	Barry Goldwater^{(c)}	Arizona	1^{(c)}
(unpledged electors)	Democratic	(n/a)	286,359	0.42%	—^{(d)}	(n/a)	(n/a)	—^{(d)}
Eric Hass	Socialist Labor	New York	47,522	0.07%	0	Georgia Cozzini	Wisconsin	0
Rutherford Decker	Prohibition	Missouri	46,203	0.07%	0	E. Harold Munn	Michigan	0
Orval Faubus	States' Rights	Arkansas	44,984	0.07%	0	John G. Crommelin	Alabama	0
Farrell Dobbs	Socialist Workers	New York	40,175	0.06%	0	Myra Tanner Weiss	New York	0
Charles L. Sullivan	Constitution	Mississippi	(TX) 18,162	0.03%	0	Merritt B. Curtis	California	0
J. Bracken Lee	Conservative	Utah	(NJ) 8,708	0.01%	0	Kent Courtney	Louisiana	0
Other			11,128	0.02%	—	Other		—
Total			68,832,482	100%	537			537
Needed to win					269			269

- a. This figure is problematic; see Alabama popular vote above.
- b. Byrd was not directly on the ballot. Instead, his electoral votes came from unpledged Democratic electors and a faithless elector.
- c. Oklahoma faithless elector Henry D. Irwin, though pledged to vote for Richard Nixon and Henry Cabot Lodge Jr., instead voted for non-candidate Harry F. Byrd. However, unlike other electors who voted for Byrd and Strom Thurmond as vice president, Irwin cast his vice presidential electoral vote for Arizona Republican Senator Barry Goldwater.
- d. In Mississippi, the slate of unpledged Democratic electors won. They cast their eight votes for Byrd and Thurmond.

Source (Popular Vote): Leip, David. "1960 Presidential Election Results". Dave Leip's Atlas of U.S. Presidential Elections.Note: Sullivan / Curtis ran only in Texas. In Washington, the Constitution Party ran Curtis for president and B. N. Miller for vice president, receiving 1,401 votes. Source (Electoral Vote): "Electoral College Box Scores 1789–1996". National Archives and Records Administration.

There were 537 electoral votes, up from 531 in 1956, because of the addition of two U.S. senators and one U.S. representative from each of the new states of Alaska and Hawaii. The House of Representatives was temporarily expanded from 435 members to 437, to accommodate this, and went back to 435 when re-apportioned, according to the 1960 census. The re-apportionment took place after the 1960 election. This made 1960 the only presidential election in which the threshold for victory was 269 electoral votes.

Popular vote
Kennedy	49.72%
Nixon	49.55%
Unpledged (Byrd)	0.42%
Others	0.31%

Electoral vote
Kennedy	56.42%
Nixon	40.78%
Byrd	2.79%

=== Geography of results ===
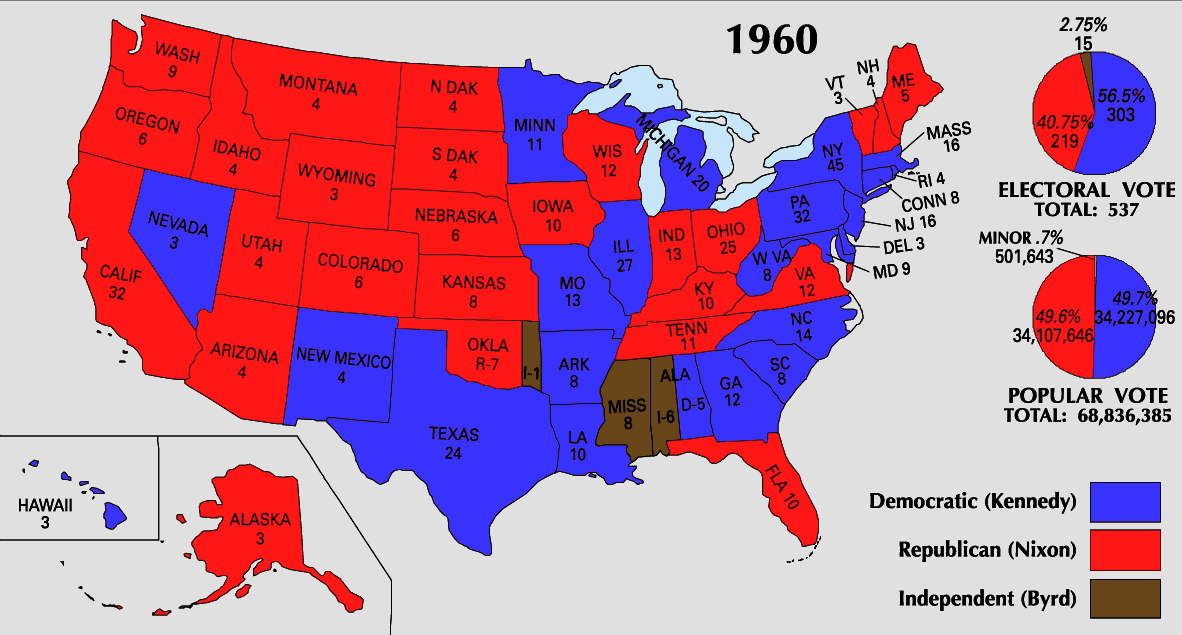

Results by county, shaded according to winning candidate's percentage of the vote

==== Cartographic gallery ====
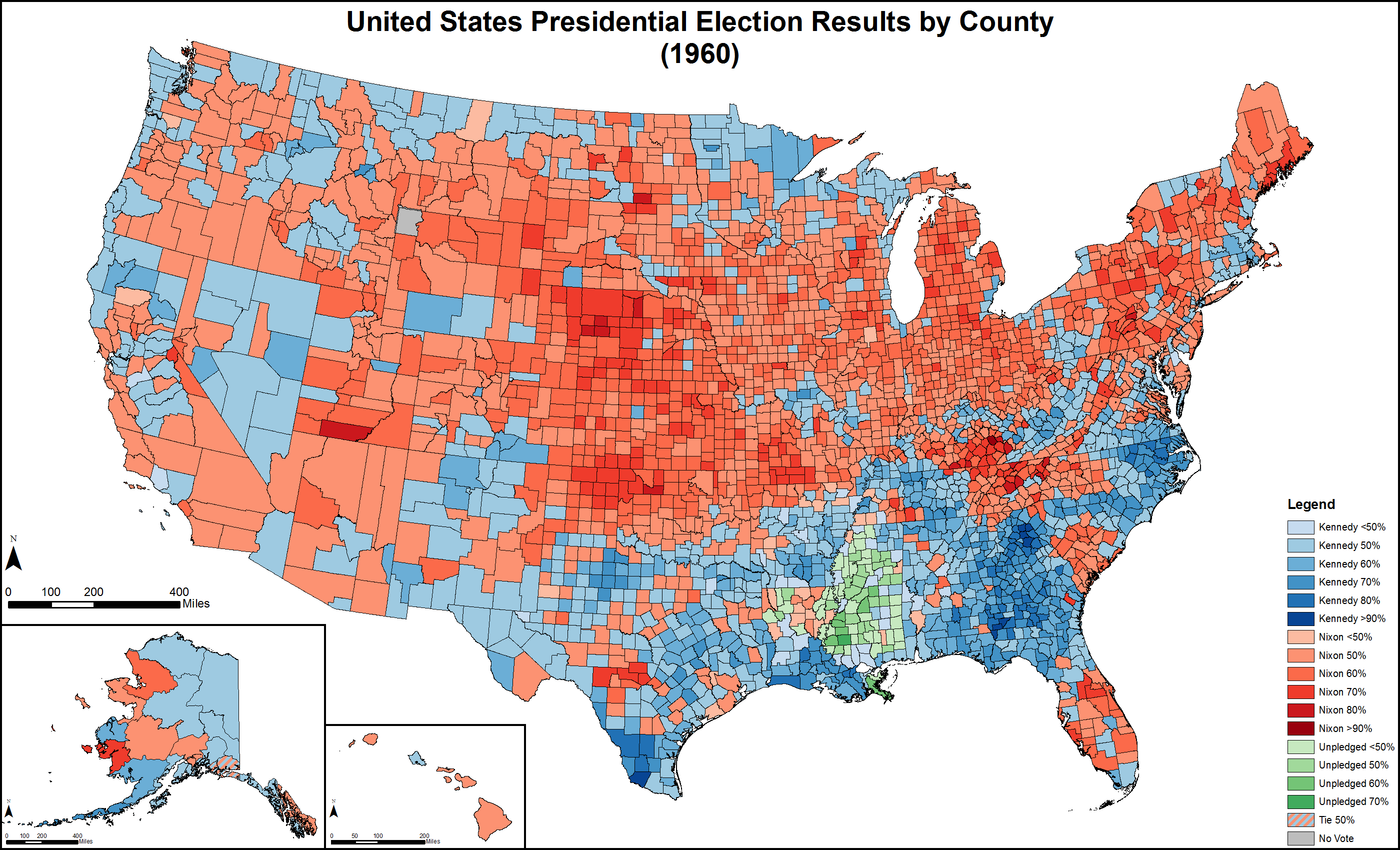
Presidential election results by county

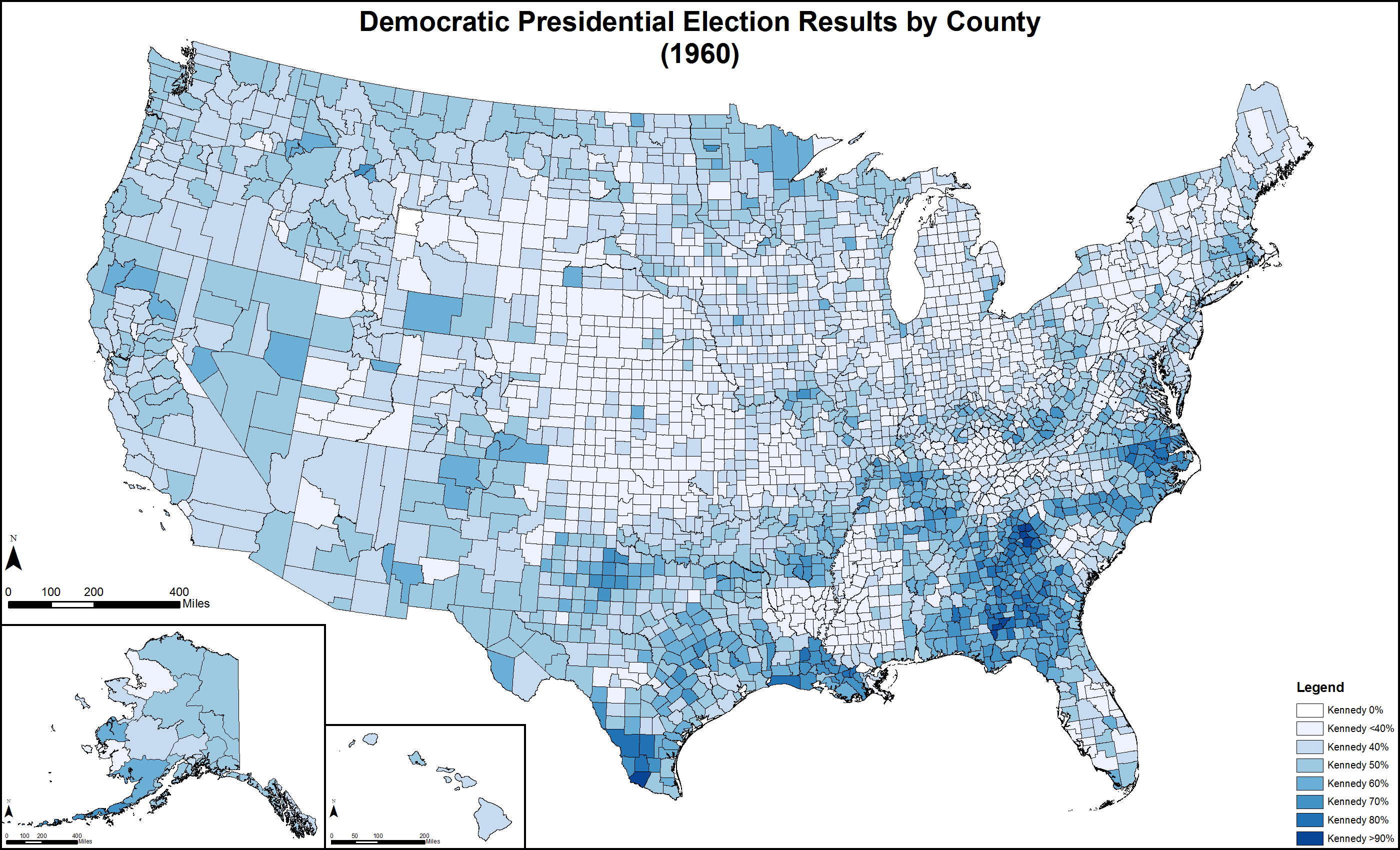
Democratic presidential election results by county

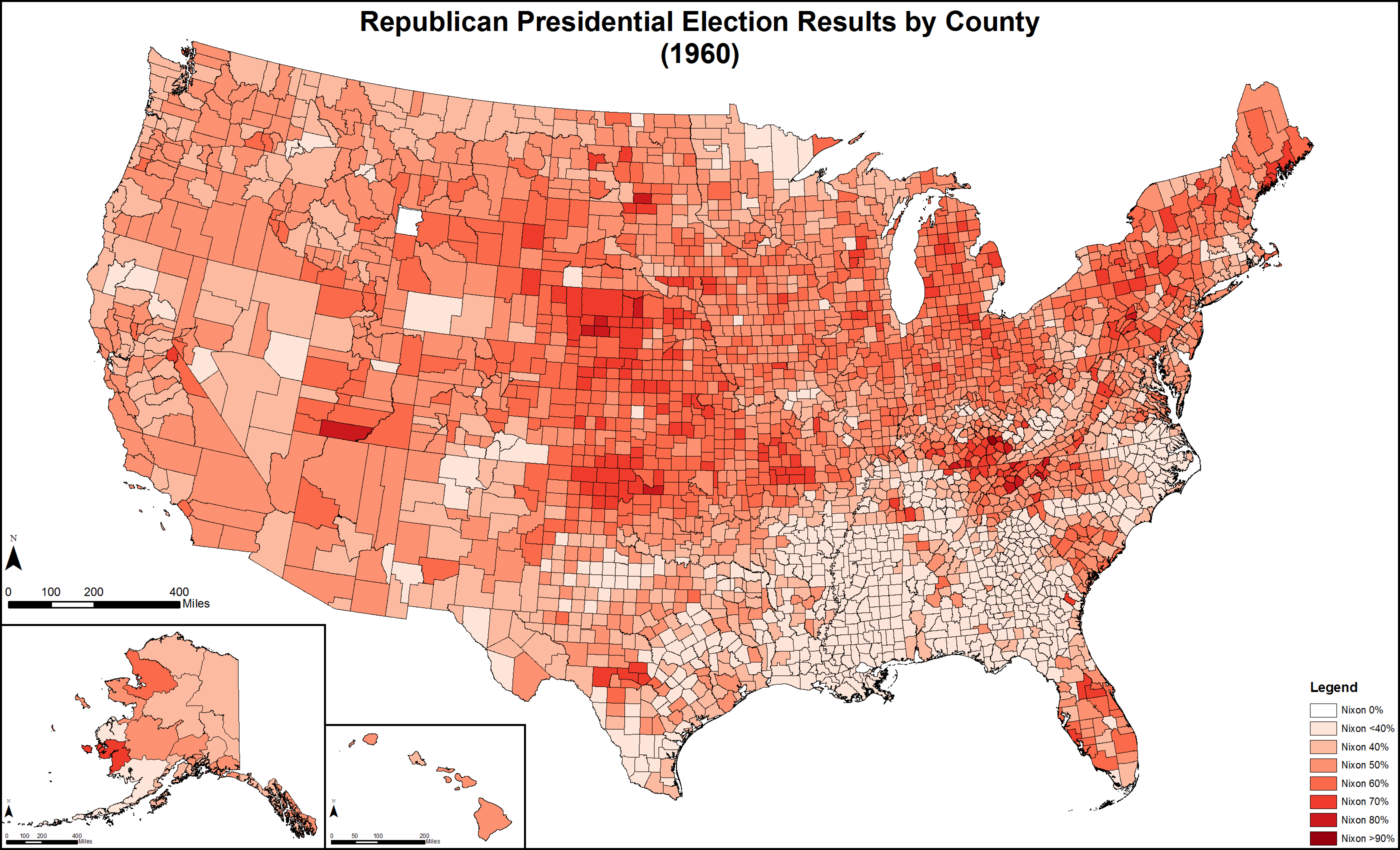
Republican presidential election results by county

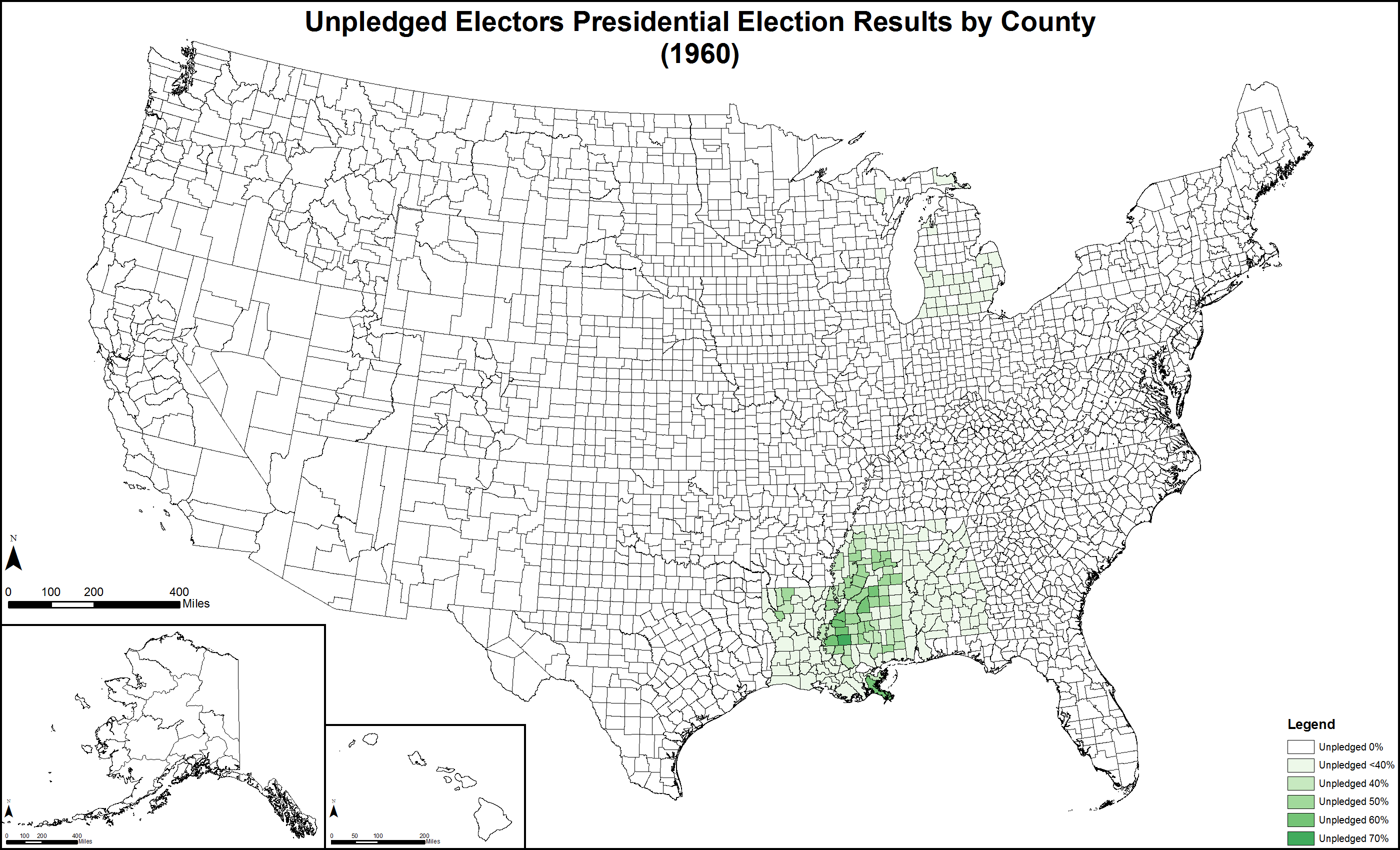
Unpledged electors presidential election results by county

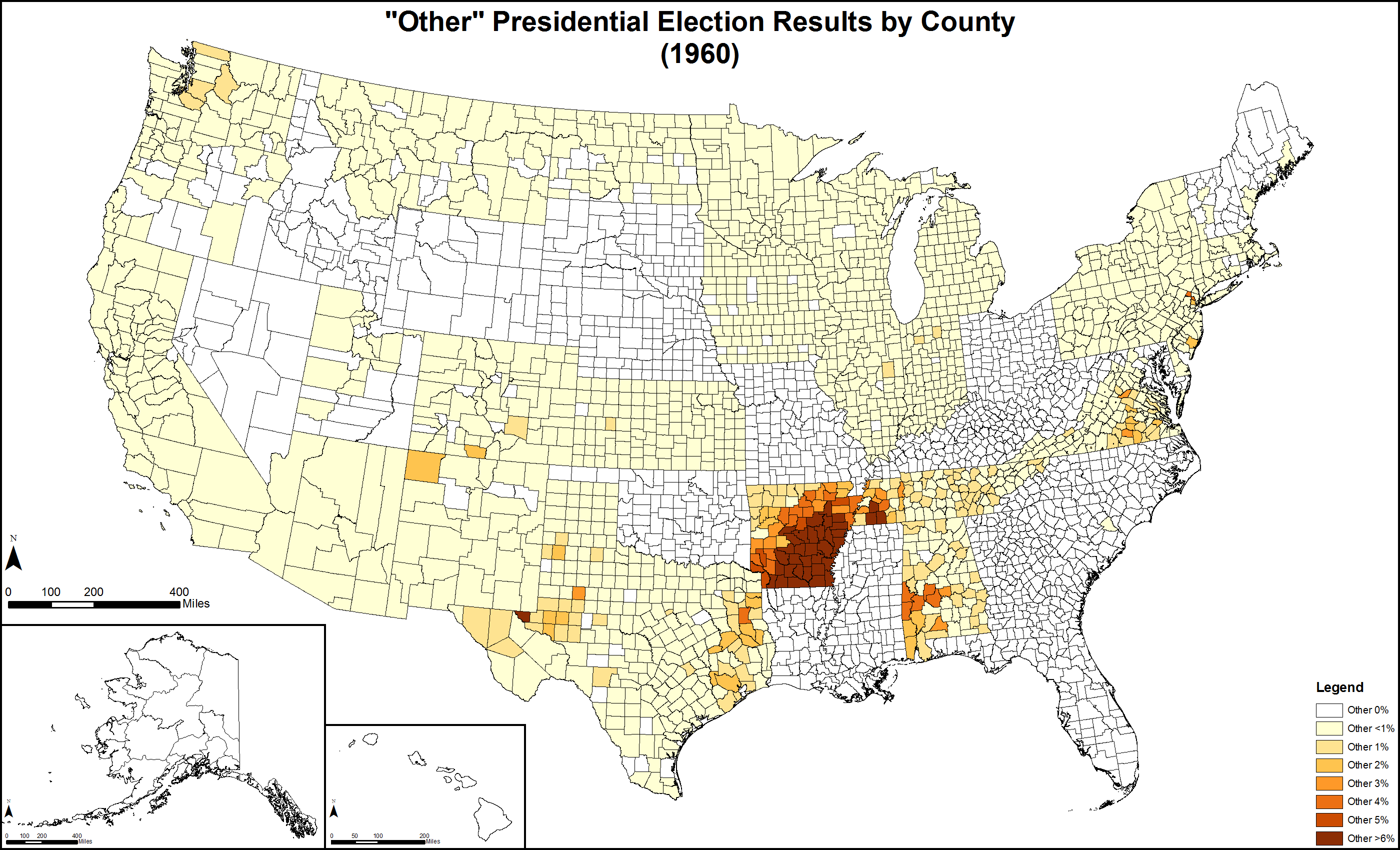
"Other" presidential election results by county

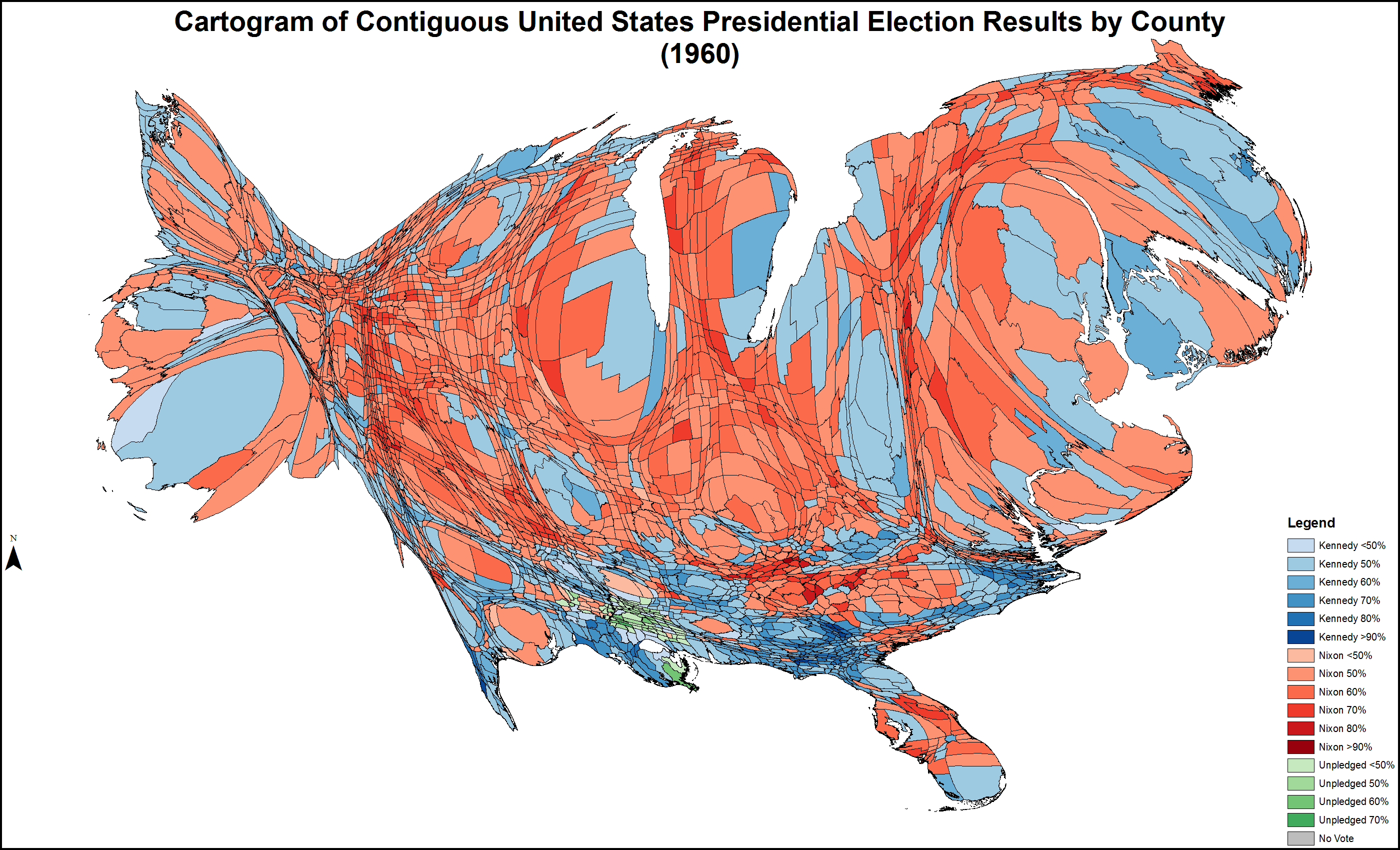
Cartogram of presidential election results by county

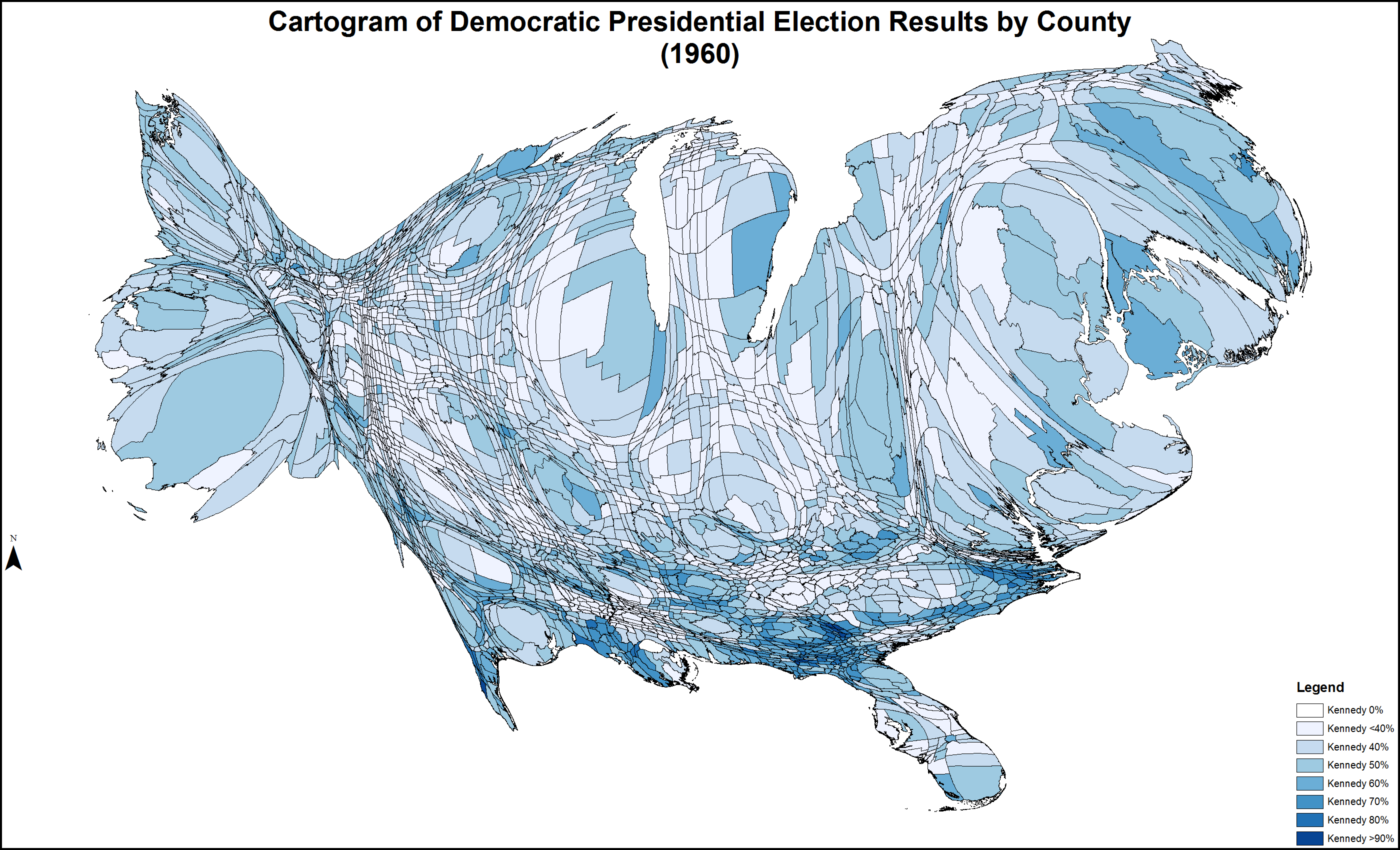
Cartogram of Democratic presidential election results by county

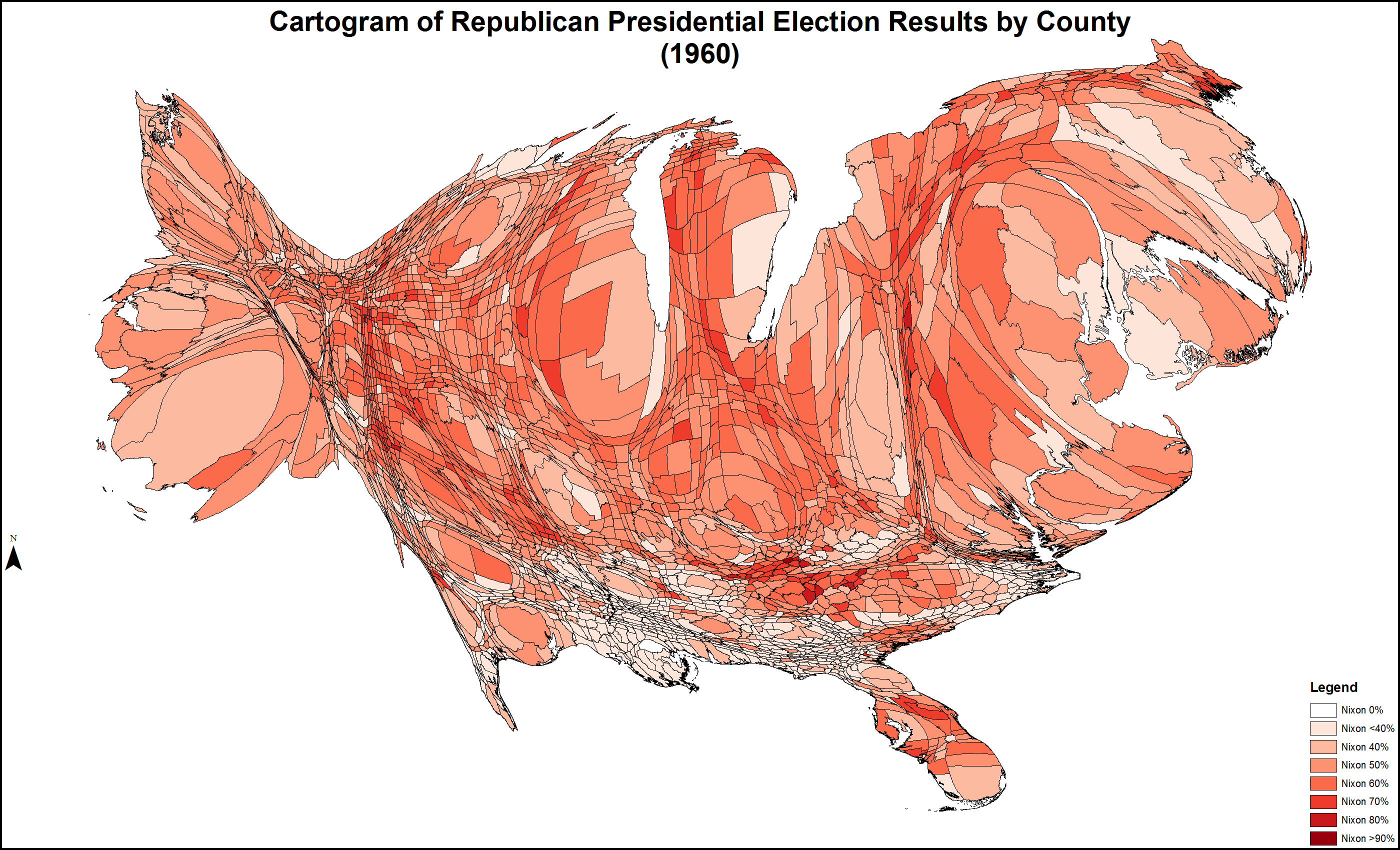
Cartogram of Republican presidential election results by county

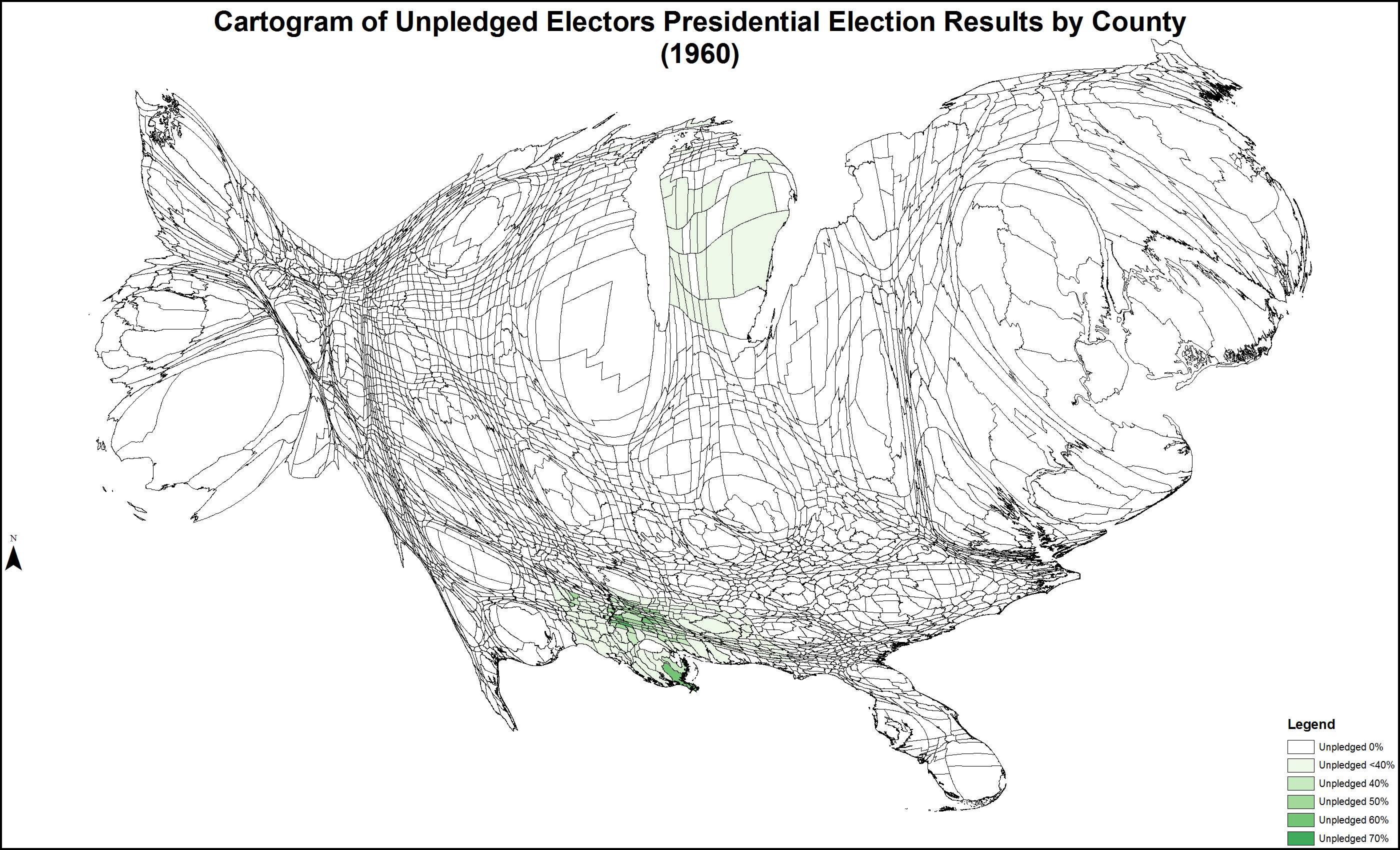
Cartogram of unpledged electors presidential election results by county

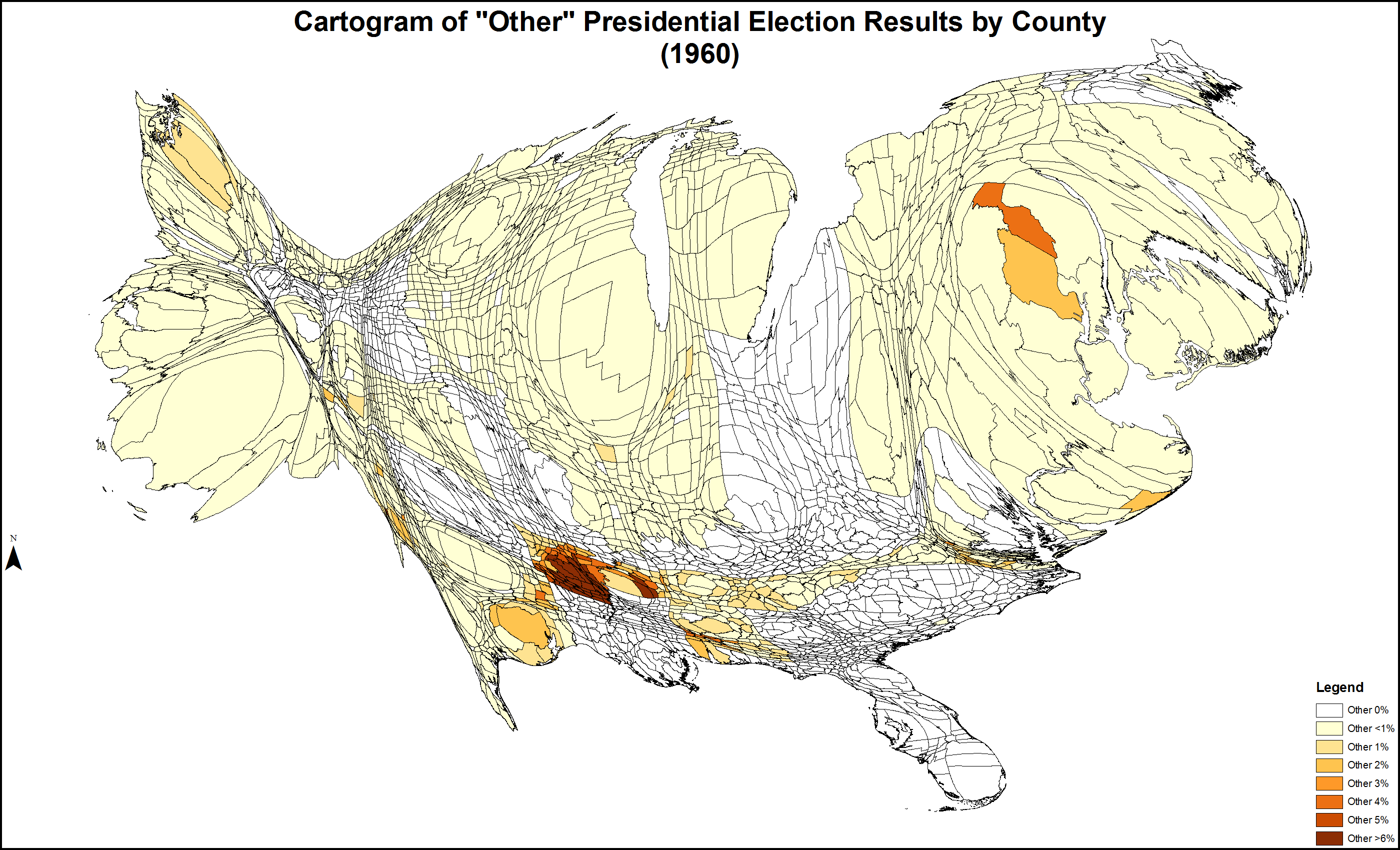
Cartogram of "Other" presidential election results by county

=== Results by state ===
States won by Kennedy/Johnson
States won by Byrd/Thurmond
States won by Nixon/Lodge

		John F. Kennedy Democratic			Richard Nixon Republican			Unpledged Electors Unpledged Democratic			Eric Hass Socialist Labor			Margin		Margin Swing (Note: Percentage point difference in margin from the 1956 election)	State Total	
State	electoral votes	#	%	electoral votes	#	%	electoral votes	#	%	electoral votes	#	%	electoral votes	#	%	#		
Alabama	11	318,303	55.82	5	237,981	41.73	–	324,050	56.83	6	–	–	–	80,322	−1.01	−2.90	880,334	AL
Alaska	3	29,809	49.06	–	30,953	50.94	3	–	–	–	–	–	–	−1,144	−1.88	N/A	60,762	AK
Arizona	4	176,781	44.36	–	221,241	55.52	4	–	–	–	469	0.12	–	−44,460	−11.16	10.93	398,491	AZ
Arkansas	8	215,049	50.19	8	184,508	43.06	–	–	–	–	–	–	–	30,541	7.13	0.49	428,509	AR
California	32	3,224,099	49.55	–	3,259,722	50.10	32	–	–	–	1,051	0.02	–	−35,623	−0.55	10.56	6,506,578	CA
Colorado	6	330,629	44.91	–	402,242	54.63	6	–	–	–	2,803	0.38	–	−71,613	−9.73	9.95	736,246	CO
Connecticut	8	657,055	53.73	8	565,813	46.27	–	–	–	–	–	–	–	91,242	7.46	34.92	1,222,883	CT
Delaware	3	99,590	50.63	3	96,373	49.00	–	–	–	–	82	0.04	–	3,217	1.64	12.11	196,683	DE
Florida	10	748,700	48.49	–	795,476	51.51	10	–	–	–	–	–	–	−46,776	−3.03	11.51	1,544,176	FL
Georgia	12	458,638	62.54	12	274,472	37.43	–	–	–	–	–	–	–	184,166	25.11	−8.72	733,349	GA
Hawaii	3	92,410	50.03	3	92,295	49.97	–	–	–	–	–	–	–	115	0.06	N/A	184,705	HI
Idaho	4	138,853	46.22	–	161,597	53.78	4	–	–	–	–	–	–	−22,744	−7.57	14.82	300,450	ID
Illinois	27	2,377,846	49.98	27	2,368,988	49.80	–	–	–	–	10,560	0.22	–	8,858	0.19	19.42	4,757,409	IL
Indiana	13	952,358	44.60	–	1,175,120	55.03	13	–	–	–	1,136	0.05	–	−222,762	−10.43	9.77	2,135,360	IN
Iowa	10	550,565	43.22	–	722,381	56.71	10	–	–	–	230	0.02	–	−171,816	−13.49	4.92	1,273,810	IA
Kansas	8	363,213	39.10	–	561,474	60.45	8	–	–	–	–	–	–	−198,261	−21.35	9.88	928,825	KS
Kentucky	10	521,855	46.41	–	602,607	53.59	10	–	–	–	–	–	–	−80,752	−7.18	1.91	1,124,462	KY
Louisiana	10	407,339	50.42	10	230,980	28.59	–	169,572	20.99	–	–	–	–	176,359	21.83	35.61	807,891	LA
Maine	5	181,159	42.95	–	240,608	57.05	5	–	–	–	–	–	–	−59,449	−14.10	27.63	421,767	ME
Maryland	9	565,808	53.61	9	489,538	46.39	–	–	–	–	–	–	–	76,270	7.23	27.30	1,055,349	MD
Massachusetts	16	1,487,174	60.22	16	976,750	39.55	–	–	–	–	3,892	0.16	–	510,424	20.67	39.62	2,469,480	MA
Michigan	20	1,687,269	50.85	20	1,620,428	48.84	–	539	0.02	–	1,718	0.05	–	66,841	2.01	13.49	3,318,097	MI
Minnesota	11	779,933	50.58	11	757,915	49.16	–	–	–	–	962	0.06	–	22,018	1.43	9.03	1,541,887	MN
Mississippi	8	108,362	36.34	–	73,561	24.67	–	116,248	38.99	8	–	–	–	−7,886	−2.64	−31.14	298,171	MS
Missouri	13	972,201	50.26	13	962,221	49.74	–	–	–	–	–	–	–	9,980	0.52	0.30	1,934,422	MO
Montana	4	134,891	48.60	–	141,841	51.10	4	–	–	–	–	–	–	−6,950	−2.50	11.77	277,579	MT
Nebraska	6	232,542	37.93	–	380,553	62.07	6	–	–	–	–	–	–	−148,011	−24.14	6.89	613,095	NE
Nevada	3	54,880	51.16	3	52,387	48.84	–	–	–	–	–	–	–	2,493	2.32	18.26	107,267	NV
New Hampshire	4	137,772	46.58	–	157,989	53.42	4	–	–	–	–	–	–	−20,217	−6.84	25.43	295,761	NH
New Jersey	16	1,385,415	49.96	16	1,363,324	49.16	–	–	–	–	4,262	0.15	–	22,091	0.80	31.83	2,773,111	NJ
New Mexico	4	156,027	50.15	4	153,733	49.41	–	–	–	–	570	0.18	–	2,294	0.74	16.76	311,107	NM
New York	45	3,830,085	52.53	45	3,446,419	47.27	–	–	–	–	–	–	–	383,666	5.26	27.67	7,291,079	NY
North Carolina	14	713,136	52.11	14	655,420	47.89	–	–	–	–	–	–	–	57,716	4.22	2.89	1,368,556	NC
North Dakota	4	123,963	44.52	–	154,310	55.42	4	–	–	–	–	–	–	−30,347	−10.90	12.73	278,431	ND
Ohio	25	1,944,248	46.72	–	2,217,611	53.28	25	–	–	–	–	–	–	−273,363	−6.57	15.66	4,161,859	OH
Oklahoma	8	370,111	40.98	–	533,039	59.02	7	0	0.00	1	–	–	–	−162,928	−18.04	−7.78	903,150	OK
Oregon	6	367,402	47.32	–	408,060	52.56	6	–	–	–	–	–	–	−40,658	−5.24	5.25	776,421	OR
Pennsylvania	32	2,556,282	51.06	32	2,439,956	48.74	–	–	–	–	7,185	0.14	–	116,326	2.32	15.51	5,006,541	PA
Rhode Island	4	258,032	63.63	4	147,502	36.37	–	–	–	–	–	–	–	110,530	27.26	43.78	405,535	RI
South Carolina	8	198,129	51.24	8	188,558	48.76	–	–	–	–	–	–	–	9,571	2.48	−13.44	386,688	SC
South Dakota	4	128,070	41.79	–	178,417	58.21	4	–	–	–	–	–	–	−50,347	−16.43	0.34	306,487	SD
Tennessee	11	481,453	45.77	–	556,577	52.92	11	–	–	–	–	–	–	−75,124	−7.14	−6.52	1,051,792	TN
Texas	24	1,167,567	50.52	24	1,121,310	48.52	–	–	–	–	–	–	–	46,257	2.00	13.28	2,311,084	TX
Utah	4	169,248	45.17	–	205,361	54.81	4	–	–	–	–	–	–	−36,113	−9.64	19.48	374,709	UT
Vermont	3	69,186	41.35	–	98,131	58.65	3	–	–	–	–	–	–	−28,945	−17.30	27.05	167,324	VT
Virginia	12	362,327	46.97	–	404,521	52.44	12	–	–	–	397	0.05	–	−42,194	−5.47	11.54	771,449	VA
Washington	9	599,298	48.27	–	629,273	50.68	9	–	–	–	10,895	0.88	–	−29,975	−2.41	6.06	1,241,572	WA
West Virginia	8	441,786	52.73	8	395,995	47.27	–	–	–	–	–	–	–	45,791	5.47	13.63	837,781	WV
Wisconsin	12	830,805	48.05	–	895,175	51.77	12	–	–	–	1,310	0.08	–	−64,370	−3.72	20.02	1,729,082	WI
Wyoming	3	63,331	44.99	–	77,451	55.01	3	–	–	–	–	–	–	−14,120	−10.03	10.13	140,782	WY
TOTALS:	537	34,220,984	49.72	303	34,108,157	49.55	219	286,359	0.42	15	47,522	0.07	–	112,827	0.16	15.56	68,832,482	US

==== States that flipped from Republican to Democratic ====
- Connecticut
- Delaware
- Illinois
- Louisiana
- Maryland
- Massachusetts
- Michigan
- Minnesota
- Nevada
- New Jersey
- New Mexico
- New York
- Pennsylvania
- Rhode Island
- Texas
- West Virginia

==== States that flipped from Democratic to Unpledged ====
- Alabama
- Mississippi

=== Close states ===
Margin of victory less than 1% (95 electoral votes):

1. Hawaii, 0.06% (115 votes)
2. Illinois, 0.19% (8,858 votes)
3. Missouri, 0.52% (9,980 votes) (tipping point state for Kennedy)
4. California, 0.55% (35,623 votes)
5. New Mexico, 0.74% (2,294 votes)
6. New Jersey, 0.80% (22,091 votes) (tipping point state if Nixon wins)

Margin of victory over 1%, but under 5% (161 electoral votes):

1. Minnesota, 1.43% (22,018 votes)
2. Delaware, 1.64% (3,217 votes)
3. Alaska, 1.88% (1,144 votes)
4. Texas, 2.00% (46,257 votes)
5. Michigan, 2.01% (66,841 votes)
6. Nevada, 2.32% (2,493 votes)
7. Pennsylvania, 2.32% (116,326 votes)
8. Washington, 2.41% (29,975 votes)
9. South Carolina, 2.48% (9,571 votes)
10. Montana, 2.50% (6,950 votes)
11. Mississippi, 2.64% (7,886 votes)
12. Florida, 3.03% (46,776 votes)
13. Wisconsin, 3.72% (64,370 votes)
14. North Carolina, 4.22% (57,716 votes)

Margin of victory over 5%, but under 10% (160 electoral votes):

1. Oregon, 5.24% (40,658 votes)
2. New York, 5.26% (383,666 votes)
3. West Virginia, 5.46% (45,791 votes)
4. Virginia, 5.47% (42,194 votes)
5. Ohio, 6.57% (273,363 votes)
6. New Hampshire, 6.84% (20,217 votes)
7. Arkansas, 7.13% (30,541 votes)
8. Tennessee, 7.15% (75,124 votes)
9. Kentucky, 7.18% (80,752 votes)
10. Maryland, 7.22% (76,270 votes)
11. Connecticut, 7.46% (91,242 votes)
12. Idaho, 7.56% (22,744 votes)
13. Utah, 9.64% (36,113 votes)
14. Colorado, 9.73% (71,613 votes)

==== Statistics ====
Counties with Highest Percent of Vote (Democratic)

1. Seminole County, Georgia 95.35%
2. Miller County, Georgia 94.74%
3. Hart County, Georgia 93.51%
4. Starr County, Texas 93.49%
5. Madison County, Georgia 92.18%

Counties with Highest Percent of Vote (Republican)

1. Jackson County, Kentucky 90.35%
2. Johnson County, Tennessee 86.74%
3. Owsley County, Kentucky 86.24%
4. Hooker County, Nebraska 86.19%
5. Sevier County, Tennessee 85.05%

Counties with Highest Percent of Vote (Other)

1. Amite County, Mississippi 72.72%
2. Wilkinson County, Mississippi 68.09%
3. Jefferson County, Mississippi 66.54%
4. Franklin County, Mississippi 66.37%
5. Rankin County, Mississippi 65.12%

== Voter demographics ==
The 1960 presidential vote by demographic subgroup
Demographic subgroup	Kennedy	Nixon
Total vote	50.1	49.9
Gender
Men	52	48
Women	49	51
Age
18–29 years old	54	46
30–49 years old	54	46
50 and older	46	54
Race
White	49	51
Black	68	32
Religion
Protestants	38	62
Catholics	78	22
Party
Democrats	84	16
Republicans	5	95
Independents	43	57
Education
Less than high school	55	45
High school	52	48
College graduate or higher	39	61
Occupation
Professional and business	42	58
White-collar	48	52
Blue-collar	60	40
Farmers	48	52
Region
Northeast	53	47
Midwest	48	52
South	51	49
West	49	51
Union households
Union	65	35

== See also ==
- History of the United States (1945–1964)
- Inauguration of John F. Kennedy
- Primary (film)
- 1960 United States House of Representatives elections
- 1960 United States Senate elections
- 1960 United States presidential debates
- Contested elections in American history

== Works cited ==
- Williams, John (1961). "Aspects of the American Presidential Election of 1960". Australian Quarterly. 33 (1). Australian Institute of Policy and Science: 25–36. doi:10.2307/20633678. JSTOR 20633678.
