= 1960 United States presidential debates =

- September 26, 1960; October 7, 1960; October 13, 1960; October 21, 1960

Nominee	Richard Nixon	John F. Kennedy
Party	Republican	Democratic
Home state	California	Massachusetts

The 1960 United States presidential debates were a series of debates held during the 1960 presidential election.

Four presidential debates were held between Republican nominee Richard Nixon and Democratic nominee John F. Kennedy. All four presidential debates were the first series of debates conducted for any US presidential election. The next presidential debate did not occur until 1976, after which debates would become a regular feature of all presidential campaigns.

== Background ==
In 1960, the Republican Party nominated the incumbent vice president Richard Nixon as their presidential nominee, with Henry Cabot Lodge Jr., the United States ambassador to the United Nations, as his running mate. John F. Kennedy, a senator from Massachusetts, was nominated by the Democratic Party as their presidential nominee. He chose the Senate Democratic leader Lyndon B. Johnson as his running mate. Most polls after the party conventions showed the Nixon–Lodge ticket having a six-point lead over the Kennedy–Johnson ticket.

== Debate schedule ==
1960 United States presidential election debates
No.	Date and time	Host	Location	Moderator	Participants	
Key: P Participant					Republican	Democratic
Key: P Participant					Vice President Richard Nixon of California	Senator John F. Kennedy of Massachusetts
1	Monday, September 26, 1960; 9:30 –10:30 p.m. EDT	WBBM-TV studios	Chicago, Illinois	Howard K. Smith of CBS	P	P
2	Friday, October 7, 1960; 7:30 – 8:30 p.m. EDT	WRC-TV studios	Washington, D.C.	Frank McGee of NBC	P	P
3	Thursday, October 13, 1960; 7:30 – 8:30 p.m. EDT	ABC studios	Los Angeles, California (Nixon); New York City, New York (Kennedy)	Bill Shadel of ABC	P	P
4	Friday, October 21, 1960; 10:00 – 11:00 p.m. EDT	ABC studios	New York City, New York	Quincy Howe of ABC	P	P

== September 26: First presidential debate (WBBM-TV studios, Chicago) ==
First presidential debate
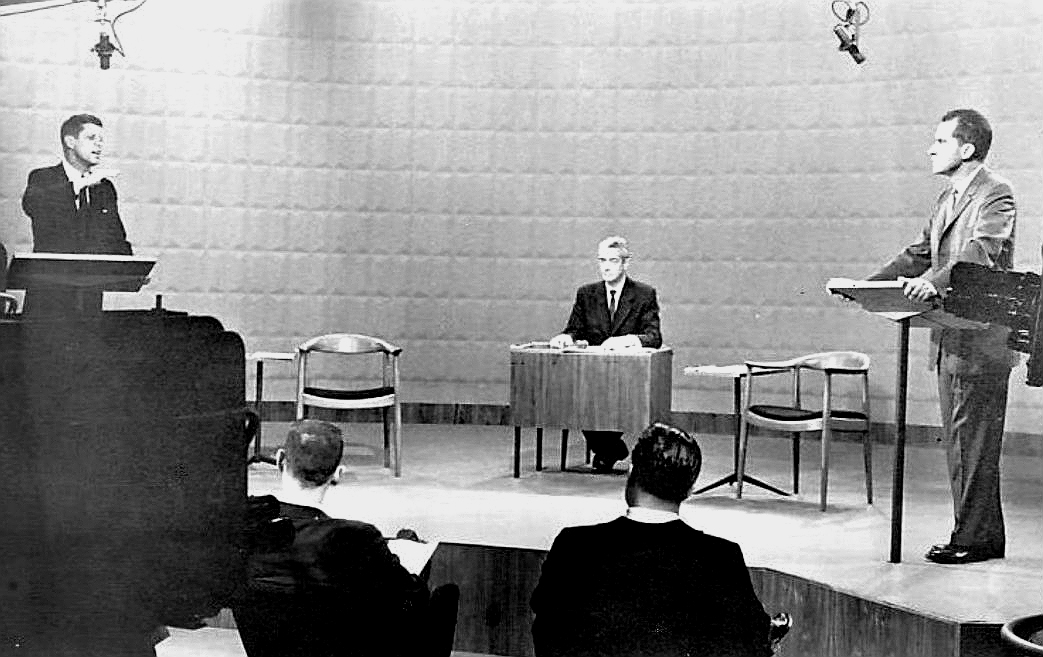
- Date(s): September 26, 1960
- Duration: 58 minutes
- Venue: WBBM-TV studios
- Location: Chicago, Illinois
- Participants: Richard Nixon; John F. Kennedy
- Moderator(s): Howard K. Smith of CBS
- Transcript: September 26, 1960 Debate transcript

The first presidential debate between Vice President Richard Nixon and Senator John F. Kennedy took place on Monday, September 26, 1960, at the WBBM-TV studios in Chicago, Illinois. The debate was moderated by Howard K. Smith of CBS with Sander Vanocur, Charles Warren, Stuart Novins and Bob Fleming as panelists. Questions were restricted to internal or domestic American matters. The format decided was:

- Eight minute opening statements
- Two and a half minute responses to questions
- Optional rebuttal
- three minute closing statements.

Full broadcast of the September 26 debate

Nixon refused make-up for the first debate, subsequently his facial stubble showed prominently on black-and-white television screens. During the debate, Nixon started sweating under the studio lights. His light gray suit faded into the backdrop of the set and seemed to match his skin tone. Reacting to this, his mother immediately called him and asked whether he was sick. Chicago Mayor Richard J. Daley in an interview said:

My God, they’ve embalmed him before he even died.

Nixon blamed his poor performance on hitting his knee on a car door in Greensboro, North Carolina, after which he had to be hospitalized for a staph infection.

== October 7: Second presidential debate (WRC-TV studios, Washington D.C.) ==
Second presidential debate
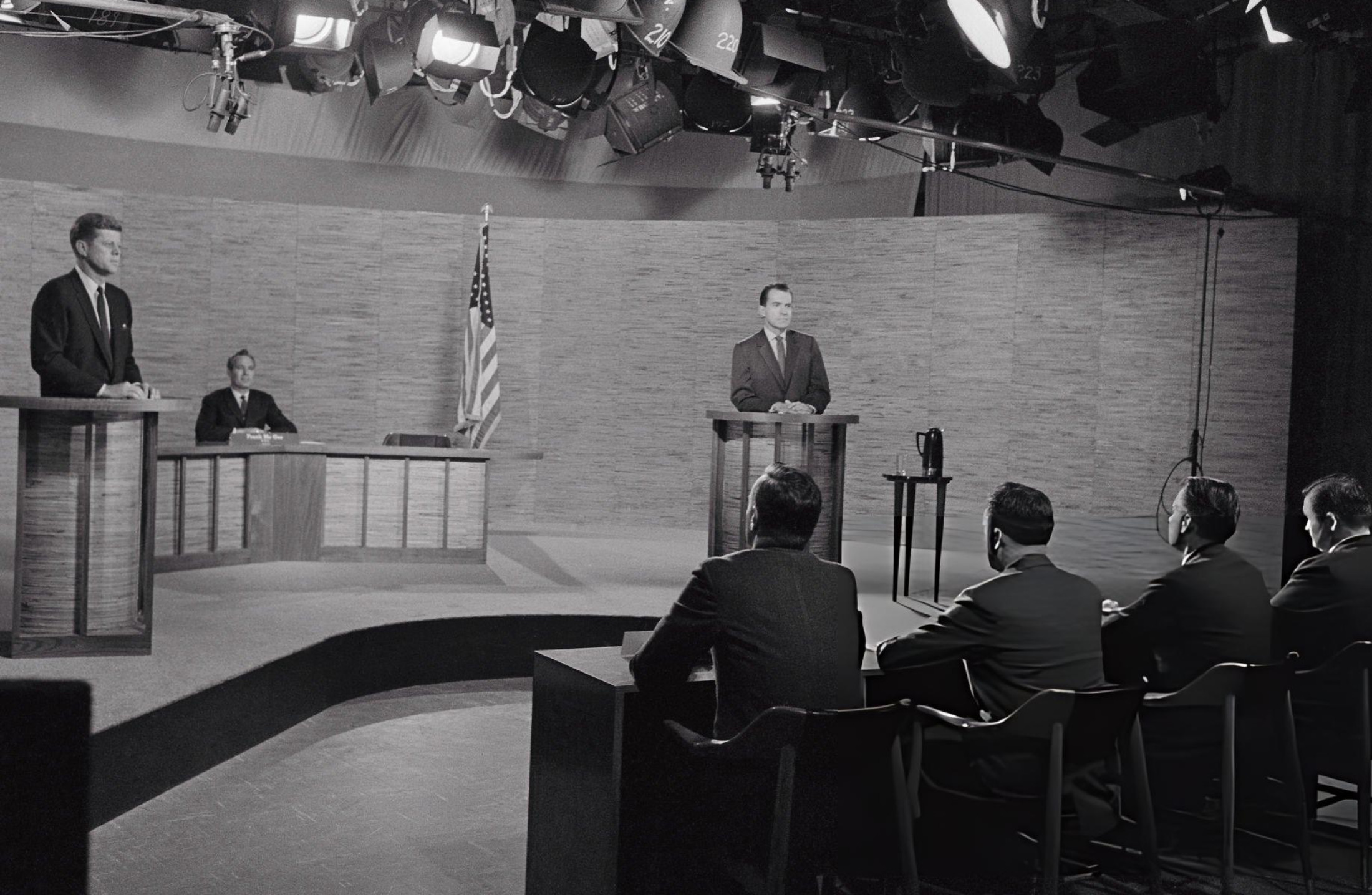
- Date(s): October 7, 1960
- Duration: 60 minutes
- Venue: WRC-TV studios
- Location: Washington, D.C.
- Participants: Richard Nixon; John F. Kennedy
- Moderator(s): Frank McGee of NBC
- Transcript: October 7, 1960 Debate transcript

The second presidential debate between Vice President Richard Nixon and Senator John F. Kennedy took place on Friday, October 7, 1960, at the WRC-TV studios in Washington, D.C. The debate was moderated by Frank McGee of NBC with Paul Niven, Edward P. Morgan, Alvin Spivak and Harold R. Levy as panelists. Questions were related to internal American matters, foreign relations, economy, etc. The format decided was:

- No opening or closing statements
- Each questioned in turn with optional rebuttal

== October 13: Third presidential debate (ABC studios, Los Angeles and New York City) ==
Third presidential debate
- Date(s): October 13, 1960
- Duration: 60 minutes
- Venue: ABC studios in Los Angeles (Nixon); ABC studios in New York City (Kennedy)
- Location: Los Angeles, California (Nixon); New York City, New York (Kennedy)
- Participants: Richard Nixon; John F. Kennedy
- Moderator(s): Bill Shadel of ABC
- Transcript: October 13, 1960 Debate transcript

The third presidential debate between Vice President Richard Nixon and Senator John F. Kennedy took place on Thursday, October 13, 1960, were held virtually at the ABC studios in Los Angeles, California (for Nixon) and New York City, New York (for Kennedy). The debate was moderated by Bill Shadel of ABC with Frank McGee, Charles Von Fremd, Douglass Cater and Roscoe Drummond as panelists. To ensure fairness, the journalists (who were in Los Angeles) and Nixon were placed in separate studios. All participants addressed the camera directly, with Kennedy and Nixon both situated without aides in studios that Shadel described as "identical in every detail." A major topic of the debate was whether military force should be used to prevent Quemoy and Matsu, two island archipelagos off the Chinese coast, from falling under Communist control, as had seemed possible during the 1958 Taiwan Strait Crisis. The format decided was:

- No opening or closing statements
- Each questioned in turn with two and a half minutes to answer
- One and a half minute rebuttals optional

This debate was considered a "monumental step for television".

== October 21: Fourth presidential debate (ABC studios, New York City) ==
Fourth presidential debate
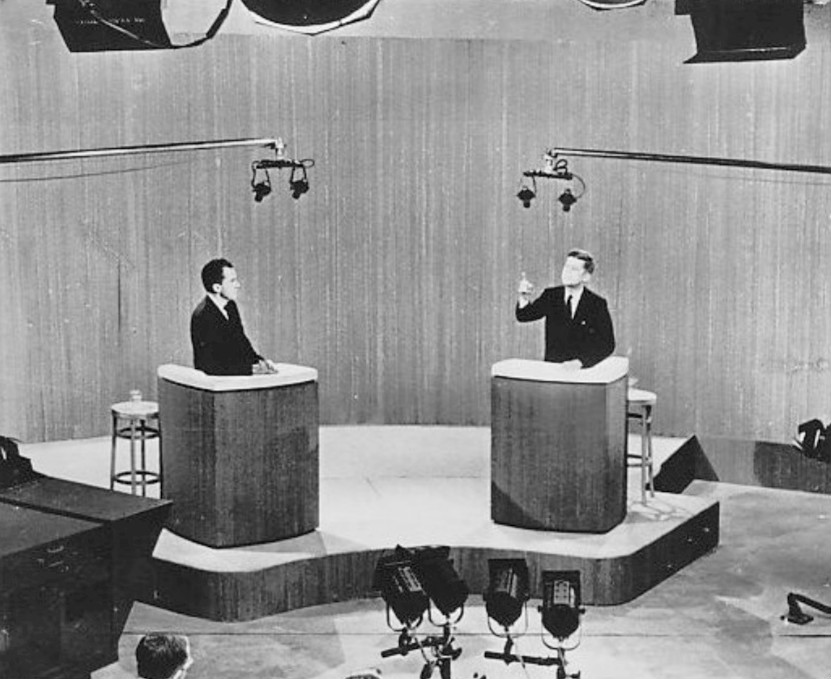
- Date(s): October 21, 1960
- Duration: 60 minutes
- Venue: ABC studios
- Location: New York City, New York
- Participants: Richard Nixon; John F. Kennedy
- Moderator(s): Quincy Howe of ABC
- Transcript: October 21, 1960 Debate transcript

The fourth and final presidential debate between Vice President Richard Nixon and Senator John F. Kennedy took place on Friday, October 21, 1960, at the ABC studios in New York City, New York. The debate was moderated by Quincy Howe of ABC with Frank Singiser, John Edwards, Walter Cronkite and John Chancellor as panelists. Questions were related to Foreign affairs. The format decided was:

- Eight minute opening statements
- Each questioned in turn with two and a half minutes to answer
- One and a half minute rebuttal
- Three minute closing statements.

== See also ==
- Richard Nixon 1960 presidential campaign
- John F. Kennedy 1960 presidential campaign
- 1960 United States presidential election
