= Douglas Edwards =

American television news anchor (1917–1990)

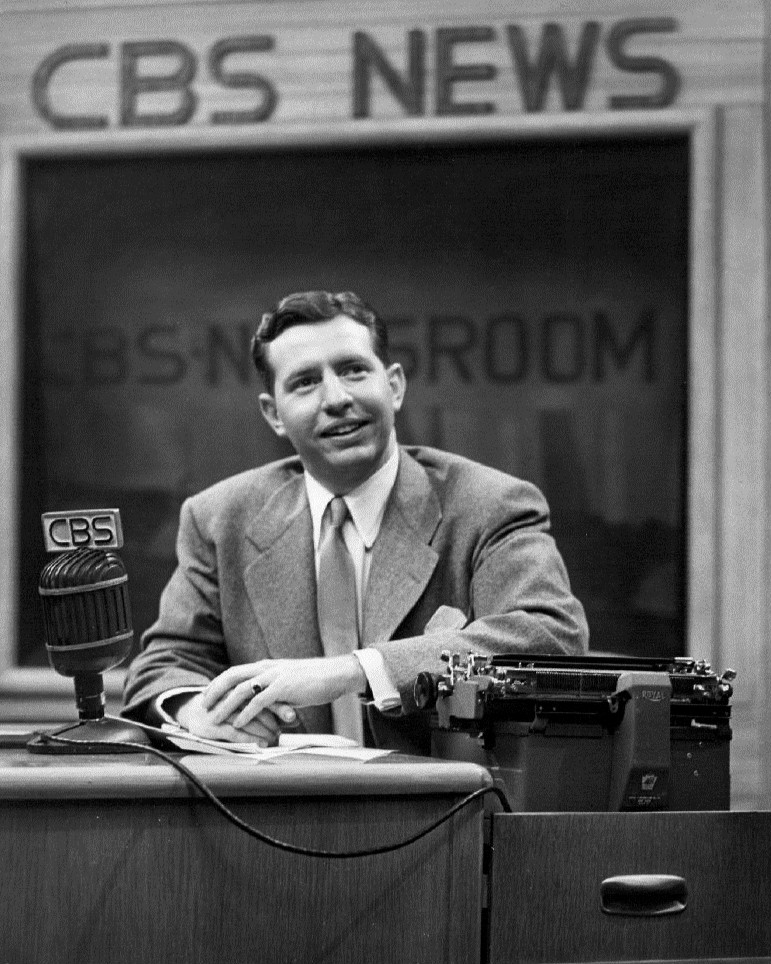
- Edwards on the set of Douglas Edwards With the News (1952)
- Born: Douglas Edwards; July 14, 1917; Ada, Oklahoma, U.S.
- Died: October 13, 1990 (aged 73); Sarasota, Florida, U.S.
- Occupations: Television and radio broadcaster, news anchor, correspondent, copy editor
- Years active: 1942–1988
- Spouses: May Hamilton Dunbar (m. 1966-1990; his death); Sara Belle Byrd (m. 1939-div.1965)

Douglas Edwards (July 14, 1917 – October 13, 1990) was an American radio and television newscaster and correspondent who worked for the Columbia Broadcasting System (CBS) for more than four decades. After six years on CBS Radio in the 1940s, Edwards was among the first major broadcast journalists to move into the rapidly expanding medium of television. He is also generally recognized as the first presenter or "anchor" of a nationally televised, regularly scheduled newscast by an American network. Edwards presented news on CBS television every weeknight for 15 years, from March 20, 1947, until April 16, 1962. Initially aired as a 15-minute program under the title CBS Television News, the broadcast evolved into the CBS Evening News and in 1963 expanded to a 30-minute format under Walter Cronkite, who succeeded Edwards as anchor of the newscast. Although Edwards left the evening news in 1962, he continued to work for CBS for another quarter of a century, presenting news reports on both radio and daytime television, and editing news features, until his retirement from the network on April 1, 1988.

== Early life and radio career ==
Born in Ada, Oklahoma in 1917, Edwards was the only child of Alice (née Donaldson) and Tony M. Edwards, both of whom were public school teachers. His mother had been married previously, but her first husband died in 1906 from typhoid fever. As a result of that earlier marriage, Edwards grew up with a half-brother, John W. Moore, who was 12 years older. Tragically, Alice also lost her second husband to disease. When Edwards was an infant, his father died of smallpox. Now twice-widowed, Alice continued teaching to support herself and her two sons. By 1930, however, she left Oklahoma and moved with Edwards and John to New Mexico for a better teaching position, one as an instructor at a normal school in Silver City. Edwards lived in Silver City for only two years, but during that time he developed a keen interest in radio technology and programming. Using a small crystal radio set that he acquired, Edwards began to monitor each day a wide range of regular broadcasts and special events, a routine made easier by Silver City's high elevation, which allowed him to tune in to distant stations transmitting from Los Angeles, Denver, Philadelphia, Pittsburgh, Atlanta, and elsewhere. "What an experience that was", he recalled in a later interview, "transfixed by broadcasts I could bring in from faraway places."

=== First broadcast experience, 1932 ===
In 1932, Douglas moved with his mother to southeastern Alabama, where she had accepted a job as a school principal in the town of Troy. Half-brother John, now 26 years old, chose to remain in New Mexico. Douglas spent his teenage years in Troy and continued his radio hobby, which he still regarded as a "new world", still "mesmerizing". Martin Weil, a staff writer for The Washington Post who compiled a biography on Edwards and wrote the newscaster's 1990 obituary for the newspaper, described the teenager's ongoing fascination with the medium:

Radio played an important role in his early years. He spent hours listening and by the age of 12 was reading newspaper stories into a telephone mouthpiece. At 15, he went on the air on a 100-watt station that older friends had patched together.

At Troy's small, makeshift radio station in 1932, the teenage Edwards was paid $2.50 a week to be a "junior announcer", a disc jockey, and to fill any lapses during broadcasts by reading poetry and even singing occasionally. Describing those formative days on radio decades later, Edwards said he found the experience thrilling, although he admitted he did not sing well, adding "but I got by, got fan mail, and the ego was nourished."

=== College years and hiring by CBS, 1942 ===
Following his graduation from high school, Edwards managed to enroll briefly at the University of Alabama to take pre-med courses and then attended evening classes on journalism at the University of Georgia and at Emory University in Atlanta before abandoning his hopes for a college degree due to a lack of money amidst the Great Depression. He nevertheless remained intent on working in radio, and between 1935 and 1940, he found employment, first at a small station in Dothan, Alabama; then at WSB in Atlanta; and next, much farther north in Michigan, at WXYZ in Detroit, where he served as a newscaster and announcer. In 1942, shortly after returning to Atlanta to work as an assistant news editor at WSB, he accepted an offer from CBS Radio to move to New York to be an assistant announcer and understudy to journalist John Charles Daly, the presenter of the network's nightly 15-minute news program The World Today. When Daly was reassigned by CBS as a war correspondent and sent overseas the following year, Edwards was promoted as his replacement on The World Today, as well as host of the Sunday afternoon program World News Today and of the Sunday night program Report to the Nation. Two years later, Edwards was also dispatched overseas, to London, to cover the final weeks of World War II with CBS foreign correspondent Edward R. Murrow. At the end of the conflict in Europe in May 1945, Edwards was then appointed the network's news bureau chief in Paris and assigned to cover post-war elections in Germany and the start of the Nuremberg trials.

== Anchor for televised CBS newscasts, 1947-1962 ==
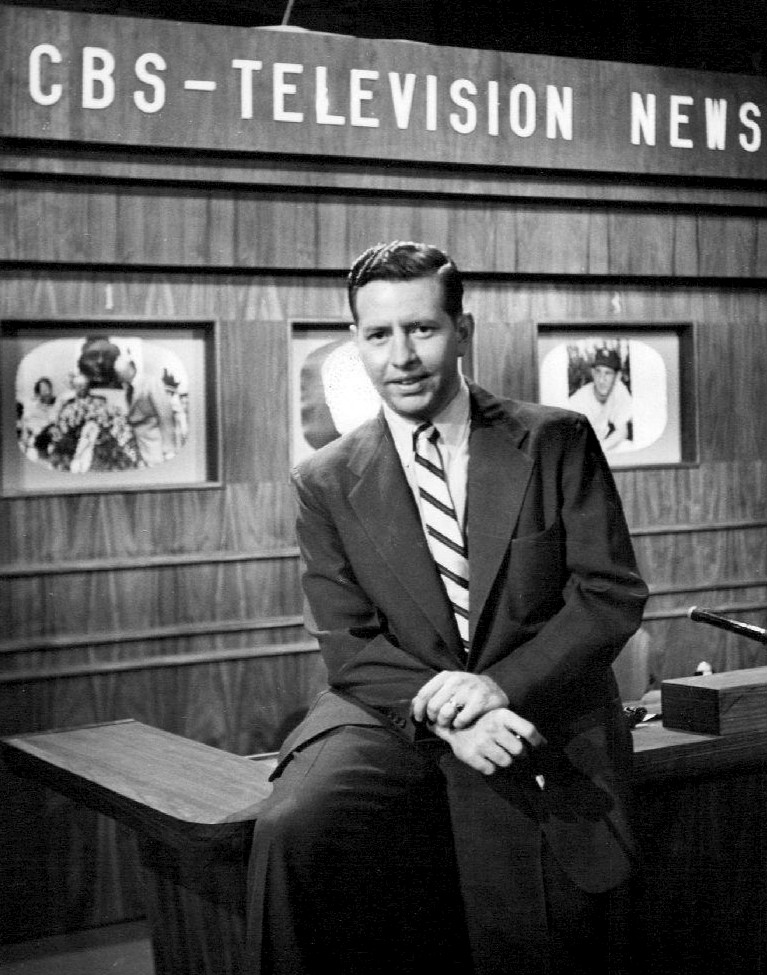
Edwards on Douglas Edwards With the News, which premiered in 1950

Edwards returned to the United States from his overseas radio assignments in May 1946. By 1947, as CBS's top correspondents and commentators continued to shun the fledgling medium of television, Edwards was chosen by network executives to work with director Don Hewitt in presenting a televised news program every weeknight and to host CBS's televised coverage of the 1948 Democratic and Republican national conventions. While Edwards served as "anchor" of the programs, that term was actually not used within the context of newscasting, at least not consistently, until 1952, when CBS News chief Sig Mickelson reportedly applied it in describing Walter Cronkite's role in the network's political convention coverage. Such news terminology developed quickly in those early days of broadcasting daily news on television, a time fraught with uncertainties not only about the technologies required to present reports in a visual medium, but also about the most effective means of delivering those reports to viewers. Edwards' friends and CBS colleagues in the late 1940s were quick to suggest ways he could make his reports more interesting to his audience. "I remember", he stated years later, "guys coming up with brainstorms like wanting me to wear a football helmet to report the football scores."

In viewership ratings, Edwards' newscasts were soon eclipsed by NBC News with its Camel News Caravan presented by John Cameron Swayze. CBS, though, quickly regained its lead due in no small part to Edwards' ongoing efforts to cover major events personally. Among the many news stories that Edwards covered in those years in the dual role of newscaster-reporter were his trip to the North Pole in 1949, the attempted assassination of Harry S. Truman in November 1950, and the coronation of Elizabeth II in June 1953. He also reported on cultural events such as the Miss America Pageant (five times). The nightly 15-minute Douglas Edwards with the News was watched by nearly 30 million viewers by the mid-1950s, as the newscaster continued his practice of periodically covering major new stories himself. In July 1956, while stationed on a helicopter hovering over the Atlantic Ocean off the coast of Massachusetts, Edwards reported the sinking of the SS Andrea Doria, on-site coverage that received widespread public attention and critical praise. Despite such efforts and positive reactions to his stories, viewership of Edwards' televised newscasts began to decline by the late 1950s as NBC's new Huntley-Brinkley Report—CBS News' chief competitor—began to attract increasingly larger audiences.

Edwards' last televised evening newscast aired on April 13, 1962 The following Monday, on April 16, Walter Cronkite officially replaced him as anchor of the telecast. The next year, on September 2, 1963, the program was retitled CBS Evening News with Walter Cronkite. It was also rescheduled to broadcast at 6:30 p.m. instead of its normal 7:30 time slot, and its 15-minute format was expanded to 30 minutes, a change that made it the first half-hour weeknight news show on American television.

== Continuing work for CBS, 1962-1988 ==
Edwards' departure from CBS Evening News did not end his work for the network either on television or radio. For several years, both during his time as network anchor and afterwards, he anchored the local late news team on WCBS-TV, channel 2, the network's flagship station in New York City. He continued to present The World Tonight on CBS Radio, and from April 1962 into the 1980s, he presented five-minute weekday national television reports: The CBS Afternoon News with Douglas Edwards, and later, after schedule adjustments, The CBS Mid-Day News with Douglas Edwards, followed by The CBS Mid-Morning News with Douglas Edwards. Beginning in 1979, he hosted the CBS Sunday morning news and talk show series For Our Times, and in 1987 he served as co-anchor with Faith Daniels for CBS Morning News. Edwards continued until his retirement On April 1, 1988, to anchor Newsbreak, a televised 74-second weekday segment that highlighted the day's top news stories.

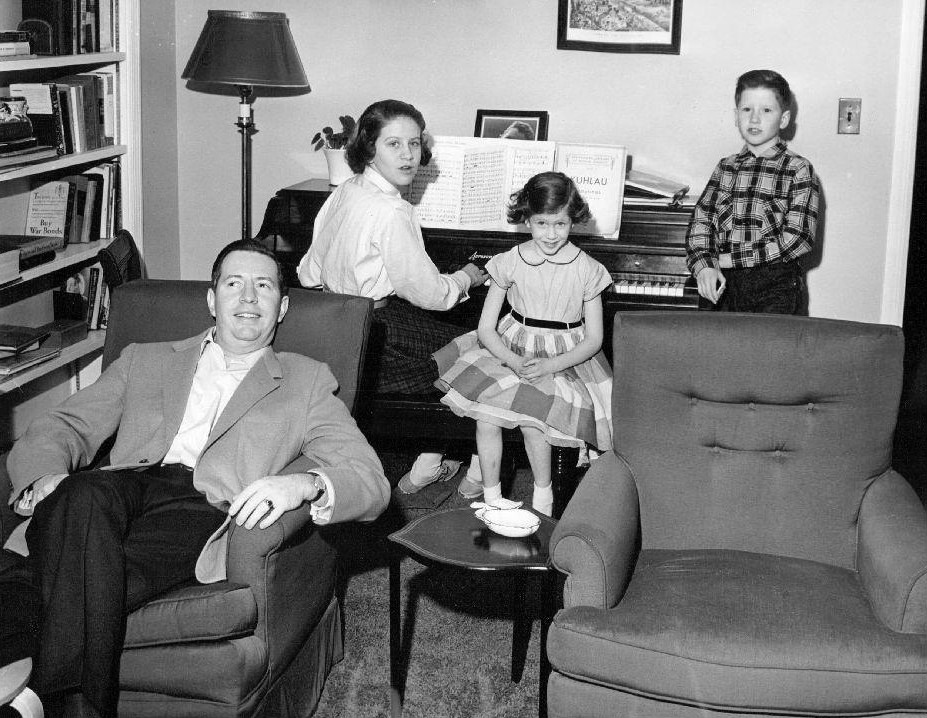
Edwards at home in 1955 with his three children: (from left) Lynn, Donna and Bobby)

After he retired from CBS, Edwards and his wife May left their home in New Canaan, Connecticut, and relocated to Sarasota, Florida. Six months later, on October 30, 1988, he returned to radio to perform as himself in National Public Radio's re-creation of Orson Welles' 1938 CBS broadcast of The War of the Worlds. Directed by David Ossman, a member of the Firesign Theater troupe, the NPR production aired exactly 50 years after Welles' original radio presentation. It featured, in addition to Edwards, actor Jason Robards, comic writer and musician Steve Allen, and various NPR announcers.

== Personal life and death ==
Edwards married twice. On August 29, 1939, he wed Sara Belle Byrd, a native of North Carolina and a resident of Atlanta when Edwards resided in Georgia for several years. The couple divorced after 26 years together, during which time they had three children: Lynn Alice, Robert Anthony, and Donna Claire. Then, on May 10, 1966, Edwards married May Hamilton Dunbar in San Francisco, California. He and May remained together until his death.

In 1990, at age 73, Edwards died of bladder cancer at his home in Sarasota, Florida. Following a memorial service at the Church of the Palms in Sarasota, Edwards's body was cremated.

== Legacy and accolades ==
Many of Edwards' early CBS radio and televised newscasts are preserved, including his World War II anchoring of World News Today, broadcasts on D-Day, and his coverage of the sinking of the Andrea Doria.

Edwards anchored the live five-minute segment The CBS Afternoon News five afternoons a week between 1962 and 1966. He began the segment immediately after the broadcast of the Goodson-Todman game show To Tell the Truth. Every moment of The CBS Afternoon News was lost due to wiping.

For Edwards' decades of contributions to broadcast journalism, he received numerous awards and accolades from colleagues and professional organizations:

- 1952 Recipient of the Certificate of Merit from TV Guide for readers' poll as the East Coast's "favorite network newscaster"
- 1952 Recipient of the "Mike and Screen Press Award" from the Radio-Newsreel-Television Working Press Association for his coverage of the Missouri River floods
- 1955 Nominee for Emmy Award as "Best News Reporter or News Commentator for the Year 1954"
- 1955 Top selection in TV Radio Mirror readers' poll as "Favorite News Commentator"
- 1956 Recipient of the George Foster Peabody Award for distinguished achievement in television journalism for "Outstanding News Program, 1955"
- 1956 Nominee for Emmy Award for "Best News Reporter or News Commentator for the Year 1955"
- 1956 Recipient of the Hamilton Time Award for his "objective and dramatic presentation of the news of the world"
- 1958 Top selection in TV Radio Mirror readers' poll as "Favorite News Commentator"
- 1960 Douglas Edwards with the News nominated for an Emmy Award for "Outstanding Program Achievement in the Field of News"
- 1961 Recipient of the Big Red Apple Award from San Jose State College for meritorious service in American journalism
- 1961 Recipient of a special service award from the Anti-Defamation League of B'nai B'rith
- 1961 Douglas Edwards with the News nominated for an Emmy Award for "Outstanding Program Achievement in the Field of News"
- 1975 Recipient of the first Freedom of Speech Award presented by the Georgia Association of Broadcasters
- 1982 Recipient of the Broadcasting Service Award from the School of Journalism and Mass Communication at the University of Georgia
- 1982 Recipient of the Gold Mike Award for broadcast achievement at the CBS Radio Network Affiliates Convention
- 1986 Recipient of the Lowell Thomas Award from Marist College for outstanding broadcast journalism
- 1986 Inductee to the National Broadcasters Hall of Fame
- 1987 Recipient of the National Association of Broadcasters Radio Award
- 1988 Recipient of the Paul White Award from the Radio Television Digital News Association
- 2006 Inductee to the National Radio Hall of Fame

Media offices
Preceded by Originator	CBS Evening News anchor May 3, 1948 - April 16, 1962	Succeeded by Walter Cronkite
