= Vanocur =

Vanocur is a surname. Notable people with the surname include:

- Chris Vanocur, American television journalist
- Sander Vanocur (1928–2019), American journalist
