= Eliot Frankel =

Eliot Frankel (1923 – February 4, 1990) was a three-time Emmy Award recipient as an NBC producer as well as an academic and educator.

== Career ==
After three years as a reporter for the Newark Evening News, Frankel joined NBC in 1950 as a writer for the Camel News Caravan, hosted by John Cameron Swayze.

Frankel later was appointed as one of the news editor of The Today Show. In 1956, he went to work for The Huntley-Brinkley Report, where he remained until 1963, when he moved to London to direct the network's European news gathering; remained there until 1966.

== Post-NBC ==
In 1980, Frankel retired from NBC to teach journalism at New York University.

== Death ==
Frankel died of stomach cancer at St. Peter's Medical Center in New Brunswick, New Jersey, aged 67.
