= Jim Hartz =

American journalist (1940–2022)

- Born: James Leroy Hartz; February 3, 1940; Tulsa, Oklahoma, U.S.
- Died: April 17, 2022 (aged 82); Fairfax County, Virginia, U.S.
- Occupation(s): News Anchor, Columnist, Reporter
- Years active: 1962–1993

James Leroy Hartz (February 3, 1940 – April 17, 2022) was an American television personality, columnist and reporter during the mid- and late-1970s. At age 24, he was the youngest correspondent NBC had ever hired. Hartz became best known to a national audience for a two-year position as the co-host of the Today Show, along with Barbara Walters. Hartz replaced the deceased Frank McGee, who also hailed from Oklahoma, and at whose funeral Hartz had delivered the eulogy.

== Life and career ==
Hartz was born on February 3, 1940, in Tulsa, Oklahoma, and graduated from Tulsa Central High School in 1958. He then attended the University of Tulsa as a premed student, but after three years he decided to pursue journalism instead. Hartz first became a reporter for KOTV in Tulsa in 1962 and was promoted to news director in 1964, shortly before he joined NBC-owned WNBC-TV in New York. At the age of 24, he was the youngest correspondent NBC had ever hired. There, he served as the anchor of the 6 o'clock and 11 o'clock nightly newscasts, where he remained until 1974, when NBC promoted him to Today, following the death of McGee. During his tenure at the show, Hartz, along with Walters and correspondent Tom Brokaw, covered the resignation of President Richard Nixon. Hartz also covered the nation’s bicentennial celebration, as well as the end of the Vietnam War in 1975. Hartz' run with Today turned out to be brief; Tom Brokaw would take over from him in 1976, when Walters left for ABC. Hartz then went to WRC-TV in Washington, D.C., where he was an anchor until 1979. Throughout his career, Hartz earned five Emmy Awards and two Ace Awards for cable television.

After leaving NBC, Hartz succeeded Hugh Downs as co-host of the PBS series Over Easy, sharing the program with Broadway actress, Mary Martin. He also hosted another public television program, Innovation, during the early 1980s. In the early 1990s, he co-anchored a weekly PBS-NHK joint venture news program, Asia Now, from Tokyo, Japan. Hartz traveled to and from Japan over 30 times while filming this series.

Hartz, who lived in Alexandria, Virginia, became chairman of the Will Rogers Memorial Commission in 1993 and is a member of the Oklahoma Journalism Hall of Fame. Hartz has flown in a large number of military aircraft, including the SR-71, and was regarded as an aerospace expert.

His first major assignment was co-anchoring with David Brinkley during the sudden return of Gemini VIII on March 16, 1966. Hartz covered every manned flight after that from 1966 to 1976.

Hartz died on April 17, 2022, at the age of 82, from chronic obstructive pulmonary disease (COPD).

Preceded by Frank McGee and Barbara Walters	Today Show Host with Barbara Walters; April 22, 1974–June 4, 1976	Succeeded by Tom Brokaw
