= Edwin Newman =

American newscaster, journalist and author

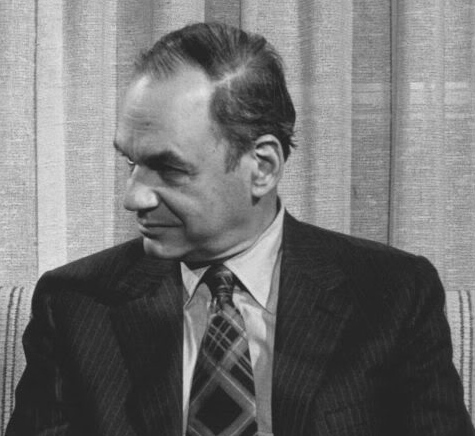
- Newman in 1975
- Born: Edwin Harold Newman; January 25, 1919; New York City, New York, U.S.
- Died: August 13, 2010 (aged 91); Oxford, England
- Education: University of Wisconsin (BA, 1940)
- Occupations: Newscaster, journalist, author
- Years active: 1945–1984
- Spouse: Rigel Grell (m. 1944)
- Children: Nancy

Edwin Harold Newman (January 25, 1919 – August 13, 2010) was an American newscaster, journalist, and author. After beginning his career with the wire services and serving in the U.S. Navy during World War II, Newman worked in radio for CBS News. He is known for a 23-year career with NBC News, from 1961 to 1984.

== Early life and education ==
Newman was born on January 25, 1919, in New York City to Myron, a credit manager, and Rose (née Parker) Newman. His older brother was M.W. Newman, a longtime reporter for the Chicago Daily News. His grandparents were all Russian-Jewish immigrants. Newman married Rigel Grell (1923–2020) on August 14, 1944. They had one daughter, Nancy, who was born on October 6, 1945, and who married the political scientist and university fund-raiser Henry Drucker (1942–2002) in 1975. Nancy died in Oxford on December 8, 2020, aged 75.

After graduating from George Washington High School Newman attended the University of Wisconsin at Madison, serving on the staff of The Daily Cardinal and earning a bachelor's degree in political science in 1940. He briefly did postgraduate work in American government at Louisiana State University before becoming a journalist.

== Career ==
=== 1940s ===
Newman initially worked for the wire services: first for the International News Service as a copy boy, mostly in the Senate, and then United Press. On Sunday, December 7, 1941, the day of the attack on Pearl Harbor, he heard the news during a radio concert. When he rang the office asking if he should come in, the reply was "Hell yes!" Newman took dictation for 12 hours as United Press reporters phoned in their stories.

He served in the United States Navy from 1942 to 1945 as a signal officer, stationed first in Trinidad and then at the Brooklyn Navy Yard. Following the war Newman worked as a reporter for United Press (1945–1946, primarily reporting about the State Department), before moving to the CBS News radio division (1947–1949) as assistant to Eric Sevareid.

=== 1950s ===
Between 1949 and 1952 Newman worked as a freelancer, primarily for NBC News. He wrote for a number of publications and, in 1951, worked for the Marshall Plan in Greece. In 1952, Newman began to work full-time for NBC. He covered significant stories: the 1952 funeral of King George VI from the freezing battlements of Windsor Castle; Britain's emergence as a nuclear power; and the 1956 Suez Crisis. At the same time, Newman enjoyed quirky stories; he once climbed a tree in Kensington Gardens dressed in a hunting outfit (complete with deerstalker hat and whistle) to investigate a report that ducks were nesting in trees.

Newman was an NBC bureau chief, first in Rome and then in Paris. In both assignments, diplomatic and political news (such as the twists and turns of the Cold War and the increasingly divisive anti-colonial Algerian War) vied with stories elsewhere in Europe and beyond. Newman covered the accession to power of President Charles de Gaulle in 1958. He was decorated as Chevalier of the Legion of Honour for his coverage of de Gaulle's funeral in 1970 and for improving the understanding of France in the United States.

=== 1961–1984: NBC News ===
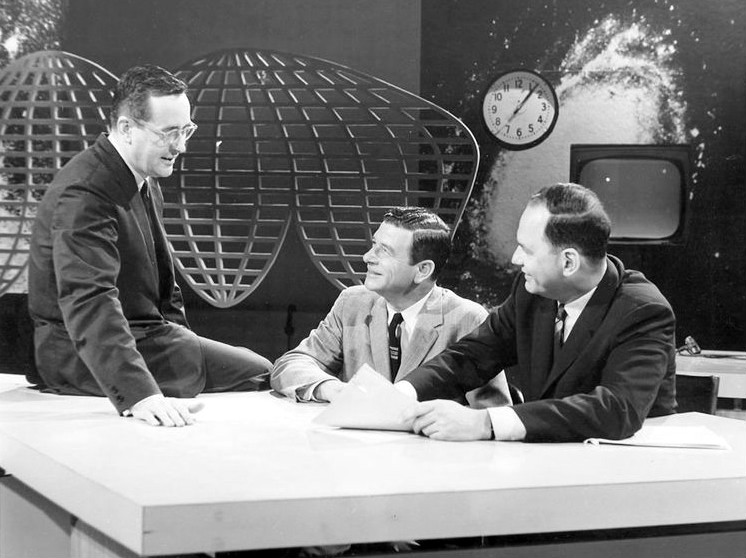
John Chancellor, Frank Blair and Edwin Newman on The Today Show, 1961

Between 1961 and 1984, Newman participated in a wide variety of NBC programs, primarily for NBC News. He was a regular on the Today show and was its news anchor from July 24 to December 22, 1961, then a contributor and guest host. On Meet the Press, he was a frequent panelist and moderator.

From 1960 to 1984 Newman played a central role in NBC's coverage of the Republican and Democratic national conventions, when gavel-to-gavel coverage was the norm. In 1964 and 1968, he, John Chancellor, Frank McGee, and Sander Vanocur (dubbed "The Four Horsemen") were fitted with state-of-the-art backpacks enabling them to roam the convention floor and conduct live interviews with delegates.

Newman specialized in reporting breaking news. In 1963, he made the first announcement on NBC Radio of President John F. Kennedy's death. He anchored the television coverage of the 1967 Six-Day Arab-Israeli War, the 1968 assassinations of Martin Luther King and Robert Kennedy and the 1973 Vietnam ceasefire. In 1981, immediately after the assassination attempt on President Ronald Reagan, he was chosen to anchor NBC's television coverage until full news teams were mustered.

Newman was the only radio journalist to interview Emperor Hirohito (Emperor Shōwa) of Japan. The interview took place in September 1975 at the Imperial Palace in Tokyo, shortly before Hirohito's diplomatically delicate visit to the United States. For his program Speaking Freely, he conducted more than 250 hour-long interviews with leading figures of the day between 1967 and 1976. Among interviewees were director Ingmar Bergman, zoologist Konrad Lorenz, classical guitarist Andrés Segovia, founder of Transcendental Meditation Maharishi Mahesh Yogi, boxer Muhammad Ali, and the first and fourth prime ministers of Israel, David Ben-Gurion and Golda Meir. The series was broadcast on Sunday mornings by local New York station WNBC, and syndicated to other stations.

Newman moderated two presidential debates, both of which demanded the calm and courtesy for which he was known. The 1976 debate, between incumbent Gerald Ford and Georgia governor Jimmy Carter, was the first presidential debate since 1960 and was marred by a 27-minute loss of audio (during which the candidates stood silently by their lecterns). In 1984, President Ronald Reagan faced former Vice President Walter Mondale; when Reagan overran the time limit for his closing statement, Newman was obliged to cut off Reagan's remarks.

Newman participated in a number of documentaries at NBC, including Japan: East is West (1961); Who Shall Live? (about kidney dialysis, 1965); Pensions: The Broken Promise (1972); Violence in America (1977); Land of Hype and Glory (1977); Spying for Uncle Sam (1978); Reading, Writing and Reefer (1978); Oil and American Power (1979); and The Billionaire Hunts (1981).

=== Other work ===
Newman enjoyed music and hosted summer Boston Symphony concerts from Tanglewood. He contributed to the work of the Religious Affairs Unit at NBC, and was a Broadway drama critic from 1965 to 1971. As a baseball and boxing aficionado from childhood, he also enjoyed sports broadcasting. He provided in-studio news updates in 1980, during the short-lived morning version of The David Letterman Show. Newman also showed his singing voice and hosted Saturday Night Live, becoming the first network news anchor to host. He also wrote a book called Strictly Speaking in 1974.

=== 1984 and beyond ===
After leaving NBC in January 1984 Newman was in demand as an interviewer, narrator, and moderator, participating in many programs on PBS and cable networks. One series to which he was particularly committed was Congress: We the People. Beginning in 1983 Newman moderated annual televised conferences of former Secretaries of State, and conducted a series of interviews with Dean Rusk (US Secretary of State, 1961–69) for the Southern Center for International Studies in Atlanta, Georgia. He narrated a series of programs about the restoration of Michelangelo's frescoes in the Sistine Chapel. In 1988 he hosted and narrated an eight-part PBS documentary on the technical and social history of television, produced by PBS affiliates KCET and WNET. He was in demand to play himself in films and on television. Among his film credits were The Pelican Brief, Spies Like Us, and My Fellow Americans; television appearances included episodes of Newhart, Mr. Belvedere, The Golden Girls, Wings, and Murphy Brown. He lectured extensively on the English language and the news business.

In 1990, he was a narrator for an Audio Renaissance dramatization of Ernest Callenbach's utopian novel Ecotopia, reading the news reports of William Weston as he tours the breakaway republic.

== Final years ==
Newman spent his final years quietly, moving with his wife to England in 2007 to be nearer their daughter. He died of pneumonia in Oxford on August 13, 2010. The public announcement of his death was delayed for a little over a month (until September 15), to allow a period of private mourning for his family. Newman was survived by his wife and daughter. Rigel Newman died in May 2020, shortly followed by their daughter in December 2020 aged 75, following years of ill health.

== Humor and publications ==
Newman had a blend of seriousness and humor. For a 1964 documentary he traveled from Paris on the Orient Express, talking to people along the way and ending up in a bubble bath in Istanbul. Newman enjoyed puns: when he worked on The Today Show, his doggerel poem reviewing each year's events would end "Happy Noo Year to Yoose from Edwin Newman NBC Noose". On several occasions, he placed a whoopie cushion on the chair of Roger Mudd, Washington correspondent for NBC News. Around the time Newman left NBC in 1984, he twice hosted Saturday Night Live; on one occasion, to the delight of the audience, he sang "Please Don't Talk About Me When I'm Gone" as part of the opening monologue. On both occasions, as well as for a third special guest appearance on the show later in the season, he hosted the Weekend Update faux newscast. Newman also briefly anchored a faux newscast based on the tabloid newspaper Weekly World News for the USA Network in 1996.

In 1974 Newman's first book, Strictly Speaking: Will America be the Death of English? reached #1 on The New York Times nonfiction bestseller list. A Civil Tongue followed in 1976, Sunday Punch (a comic novel) in 1979, and I Must Say in 1988. The latter (a collection of his syndicated columns for King Features) ranged over U.S. politics and foreign policy, his journalistic assignments, and the state of the English language. Newman served for a number of years as chairman of the usage panel at Houghton Mifflin's American Heritage Dictionary.

== Filmography ==
=== Film ===
Year	Title	Role	Notes
1985	Spies Like Us	Himself	
1986	The Canadian Conspiracy	Himself	
1993	The Pelican Brief	Himself	
1996	My Fellow Americans	Himself	
2021	Hemingway	Himself	

=== Television ===
Year	Title	Episode	Role	Notes
1987	The Golden Girls	Letter to Gorbachev	Himself	

== Bibliography ==
- Strictly Speaking: Will America be the Death of English? by Edwin Newman (1974) ISBN 978-0-88365-795-9
- A Civil Tongue by Edwin Newman (1976) ISBN 978-0-446-30758-1
- Sunday Punch by Edwin Newman (1979) ISBN 978-0-425-04671-5
- I Must Say by Edwin Newman (1988) ISBN 978-0-446-39099-6
- Reading, Writing and Reefer (1978) National Broadcasting Company, Inc. Reg No. PA0000070833 / 1980-03-18
- The Billionaire Hunts (1981) National Broadcasting Company, Inc. Reg No. PA0000110525 / 1981-07-24
