= Chet Huntley =

American television newscaster (1911–1974)

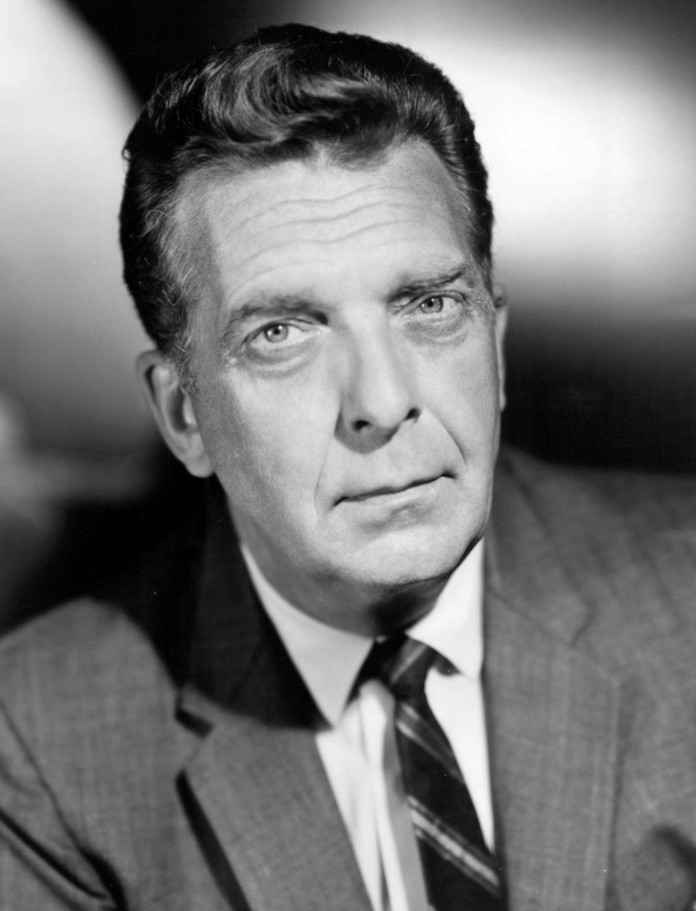
- Huntley in 1968
- Born: December 10, 1911; Cardwell, Montana, U.S.
- Died: March 20, 1974 (aged 62); Big Sky, Montana, U.S.
- Education: University of Washington
- Occupation: News anchor
- Years active: 1934–1970
- Spouses: Ingrid Rolin (m. 1936; div. 1959) Tippy Stringer (m. 1959)
- Children: 2

Chester Robert Huntley (December 10, 1911 – March 20, 1974) was an American television newscaster, best known for co-anchoring NBC's evening news program, The Huntley–Brinkley Report, for 14 years beginning in 1956.

== Early life ==
Huntley was born in Cardwell, Montana, the only son and eldest of four children born to Percy Adams Huntley and Blanche Wadine (née Tatham) Huntley. His father was a telegraph operator for the Northern Pacific Railway, and young Chet was born in the Cardwell depot living quarters. Owing to the railroad's seniority system, wherein employees with longer tenure could "bump" newer employees, the family moved often. They lived in Cardwell, Saco, Willow Creek, Logan, Big Timber, Norris, Whitehall, and Three Forks while he was a child.

He graduated from Whitehall High School in Whitehall, and attended Montana State College in Bozeman, where he was a member of Sigma Alpha Epsilon fraternity. He attended Cornish College of the Arts in Seattle before graduating from the University of Washington in 1934, with a degree in speech and drama.

== Career ==
Huntley began his radio newscast career in 1934 at Seattle's KIRO AM, later working on radio stations in Spokane (KHQ) and Portland. His time (1936–37) in Portland was with KGW-AM, owned by The Oregonian, a Portland daily newspaper. At KGW he was writer, newscaster, and announcer. In 1937 he went to work for KFI in Los Angeles, moving to CBS Radio from 1939 to 1951, then ABC Radio from 1951 to 1955. In 1955, he joined the NBC Radio network, viewed by network executives as "another Ed Murrow".

In 1956, coverage of the national political party conventions was a major point of pride for the fledgling broadcast news organizations. NBC News executives were seeking to counter the growing popularity of CBS' Walter Cronkite, who had been a ratings success at the 1952 conventions. They decided to replace their current news anchor, John Cameron Swayze, but there was a disagreement on who the new anchorman should be. The two leading contenders were Huntley and David Brinkley. The eventual decision was to have both men share the assignment. Their on-air chemistry was apparent from the start, with Huntley's straightforward presentation countered by Brinkley's acerbic wit.

This success soon led to the team replacing Swayze on the network's nightly news program. It was decided to have the two men co-anchor the show; Huntley from New York City, Brinkley from Washington, D.C. The Huntley-Brinkley Report began in October 1956 and was soon a ratings success. Huntley and Brinkley's catchphrase closing of "Good night, Chet"—"Good night, David... and good night for NBC News" was developed by the show's producer, Reuven Frank. Although both anchors initially disliked it, the sign-off became famous. Huntley and Brinkley gained great celebrity themselves, with surveys showing them better known than John Wayne, Cary Grant, Jimmy Stewart or the Beatles. The gregarious Huntley remained the same, a friend commenting in 1968 that "Chet is warm, he's friendly, he's unaffected, he's—well, he's just so damned nice."

In April 1956, before that year's political conventions that brought him to prominence, Huntley began anchoring a new half-hour program entitled Outlook, produced by Reuven Frank. The program aired for seven years, later changing its name to Chet Huntley Reporting. It often covered racial segregation and civil rights. In January 1962, the program moved from the Sunday evening news time slot to prime time.

In the 1960s Huntley narrated a General Pictures Corp. film for the Cleveland, Ohio Development Foundation titled Cleveland: City on Schedule (1962) and a Cinecraft-Continental Productions film for Haines, Inc., publishers of cross-cross city directories, titled The Key to the City (1963.)

Huntley wrote a memoir of his Montana childhood, The Generous Years: Remembrances of a Frontier Boyhood, published by Random House in 1968. He also became involved in a New York advertising agency, Levine, Huntley, Schmidt, Plapler & Beaver, gaining a 10 percent share in the agency in exchange for having his name on the letterhead and attending some agency meetings. He maintained his own cattle farm in Stockton, New Jersey, which for a short time in 1964 included a beef line from the farm's cattle promoted under his name before the network intervened due to conflict of interest and promotional concerns.

Huntley's last NBC News broadcast was aired on Friday, July 31, 1970. He returned to Montana, where he conceived and built Big Sky, a ski resort south of Bozeman, which opened in December 1973.

== Marriage ==
Huntley's first marriage, to Ingrid Rolin, produced two daughters and ended in divorce in 1959. Later that year, Huntley, at age 48, married the former Tipton "Tippy" Stringer (1930–2010), a TV broadcaster, who married actor William Conrad after Huntley's death.

== Death ==
Huntley died of lung cancer on March 20, 1974, at his home in Big Sky at the age of 62, three days before the opening ceremonies for Big Sky. Huntley was honored with a cenotaph at Soldiers Chapel on the grounds of the Big Sky Resort. Boyne USA Resorts purchased the Big Sky Resort in 1976 and has owned and managed it since. Huntley was buried at Sunset Hills Cemetery in Bozeman, Montana, 50 miles east of his hometown of Cardwell, Montana.

== Accolades ==
In 1956 Huntley received the Alfred I. duPont Award.

In 1988, Huntley was posthumously inducted into the Television Hall of Fame.

== Legacy ==
Only days before his retirement, Huntley gave an interview with Dick Cavett, available on the DVD The Dick Cavett Show: Rock Icons, Disc 2. On that broadcast, he described his political views as conservative on economic issues, but liberal on social issues. However, he stated to Cavett and the other guests that he took pains to ensure that his personal views did not adversely affect his reporting during his years as a journalist.

In 2003, a biography titled Good Night Chet, by Lyle Johnston, was published by McFarland Publishers.

Media offices
Preceded by John Cameron Swayze (as Camel News Caravan)	NBC evening news anchors (as The Huntley-Brinkley Report); October 29, 1956 - July 31, 1970 (with David Brinkley)	Succeeded by John Chancellor, Frank McGee, and David Brinkley (only Chancellor from 1971–1976 and 1979–1982)
