= Strictly Speaking =

Book critiquing linguistic change

Strictly Speaking, by journalist and TV anchorman Edwin Newman (ISBN 0-446-80106-2), sub-titled Will America be the death of English?, is a book published in 1974. Reviews credited the book as having "skillfully skinned contemporary written and spoken English".
