= M.W. Newman =

American print journalist (1917-2001)

- Born: 1917; New York, United States
- Died: 2001 (aged 83–84)
- Occupation: Journalist
- Known for: Urban affairs reporter for the Chicago Daily News
- Notable work: Chicago Tribune, Chicago Sun-Times arts columnist
- Family: Edwin Newman (brother)

Morton William Newman (1917–2001) was an American print journalist, who was a prominent urban affairs reporter for the Chicago Daily News from 1945 until the paper’s end in 1978.

== Biography ==
=== Career ===
Newman was born in 1917 in New York; his brother Edwin Newman was an NBC News political journalist in the 1950s and '60s. M.W. studied journalism at the University of Wisconsin–Madison and later worked at newspapers in both the U.S. Midwest and East Coast regions. When he started at the Daily News, M.W. worked in various jobs, from copy editor to food writer. Although best known for his coverage of crime and local news in Chicago, he spent most of his later career writing for Inland Architect and Architectural Forum while also writing arts reviews for both the Chicago Tribune and Chicago Sun-Times. Newman married his wife Nancy in 1962, and he died in 2001.
