= John Chancellor =

American TV journalist (1927–1996)

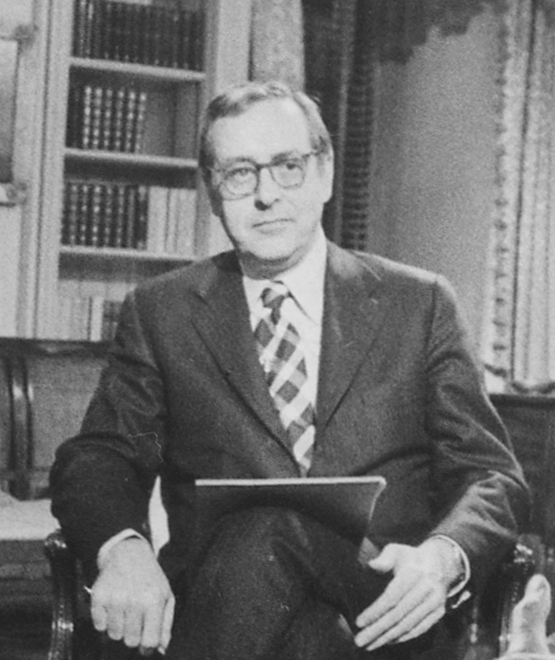
- Chancellor at the White House in 1970
- Born: John William Chancellor; July 14, 1927; Chicago, Illinois, U.S.
- Died: July 12, 1996 (aged 68); Princeton, New Jersey, U.S.
- Education: University of Illinois Urbana-Champaign
- Occupation: Journalist
- Years active: 1952–1993
- Known for: Today (1961–1962); NBC Nightly News; Anchor (1970–1982); Editor/Commentator (1982–1993)
- Spouse(s): Connie Chancellor; Barbara Upshaw (second wife)
- Children: 3

John William Chancellor (July 14, 1927 – July 12, 1996) was an American journalist who spent most of his career with NBC News. He is considered a pioneer in television news. Chancellor served as anchor of the NBC Nightly News from 1970 to 1982 and continued to do editorials and commentaries for NBC Nightly News with Tom Brokaw until 1993.

== Early career ==
Born in Chicago, Illinois, Chancellor dropped out of high school, worked odd jobs and enlisted in the Army, serving in a public relations unit during World War II. After leaving the service, he attended the University of Illinois Navy Pier campus, completing the last two years of instruction at the University of Illinois at Urbana–Champaign in 1949. Originally a copy boy at 14 for the Chicago Daily News and hired in 1947 to be a reporter for the Chicago Sun-Times, he started his career in local television in Chicago, eventually turning to national television news as a correspondent on NBC's evening newscast, the Huntley-Brinkley Report.

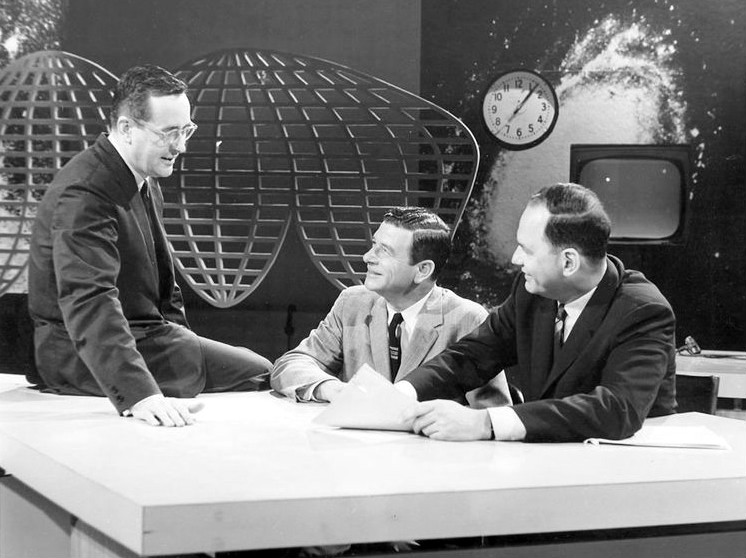
John Chancellor, Frank Blair and Edwin Newman on The Today Show, 1961

Chancellor covered issues of national importance while on The Huntley-Brinkley Report.

He covered the 1957 integration of Little Rock Central High School, where a young Black girl, Elizabeth Eckford, wanted to attend an integrated school. Chancellor's coverage showed the world the white mob that surrounded her. After Chancellor began to cover the Little Rock story, segregationists followed him around town, growing increasingly angry. Chancellor did not run. Instead, he kept reporting, despite the angry crowds around him.

Chancellor spent a number of years as a foreign correspondent in Europe, with postings in Vienna, London, Moscow, and Brussels (NATO Headquarters).

In July 1961, Chancellor replaced Dave Garroway as host of NBC's Today program, a role he filled for fourteen months. Never comfortable with the soft news focus of Today, Chancellor asked for, and was granted, a release from his contract with the show in the summer of 1962. He left the program in September, and assumed a role as political correspondent for NBC News. He, Frank McGee, Edwin Newman, and Sander Vanocur comprised a team that covered the national political conventions in the 1960s so well, they were dubbed by industry observers as the "Four Horsemen".

At the 1964 Republican National Convention, Chancellor was arrested for refusing to cede his spot on the floor to "Goldwater Girls," supporters of the Republican presidential candidate, Barry Goldwater. When security came to get him, he was forced to sign off: "I've been promised bail, ladies and gentlemen, by my office. This is John Chancellor, somewhere in custody." He then became the director of the Voice of America in 1965, at the request of President Lyndon Johnson, a spot he held until 1967.

== NBC Nightly News ==
Chancellor returned to NBC in 1968 as senior correspondent on the Huntley-Brinkley Report and, two years later when Chet Huntley retired, Chancellor stepped in to anchor the broadcast, renamed NBC Nightly News, a spot he held from 1970 to 1982; this job became the defining point of his career. Inaugurating the name and setting the pace of the format of Nightly News, from 1970 to 1971, Chancellor, along with David Brinkley and Frank McGee, was one of three anchors who rotated in a co-anchor duo format, held over from Huntley-Brinkley. NBC arranged the rotation by having McGee always broadcast from New York City and Brinkley continue at his customary Washington desk. If McGee did not anchor on a broadcast, Chancellor did from New York; if Brinkley did not, Chancellor filled in from Washington. NBC did not have separate weekend anchors during this period, as it had just inaugurated a Sunday evening newscast in August 1970, so this format was employed seven days a week.

A perceived lack of stability in this arrangement prompted NBC to go with Chancellor full-time (McGee later moved to The Today Show). From August 9, 1971, to June 4, 1976, Chancellor became the sole weeknight anchor (Garrick Utley and others took over weekend duties), stationed at the New York NBC headquarters, with Brinkley reduced to contributing pre-recorded commentaries, titled David Brinkley's Journal, about two to three times per week from Washington. Facing the continued popularity of top-rated CBS Evening News with Walter Cronkite, NBC Nightly News returned to a co-anchor format from June 7, 1976, until October 9, 1979, with Brinkley resuming his old role at the NBC Washington desk; internal disputes within NBC management prompted the network to remove Brinkley from Nightly News, assigning him to occasional documentaries until his departure for ABC in 1981.

Although Chancellor was a respected, well-spoken journalist and noted author in his own right, his broadcast ratings were eclipsed by Walter Cronkite in the 1970s, when CBS Evening News had become the most popular of the three network weeknight broadcasts. Toward the end of Chancellor's tenure, ABC, for the first time ever, became competitive with NBC and CBS with its World News Tonight.

=== "Red" and "blue" state concept ===
Chancellor has the distinction of creating the idea of using colors to represent the states won by presidential candidates in presidential elections. For the 1976 presidential election Chancellor suggested to his network's engineers that they create a large electronic map of the United States and place it in the network's election-night news studio. If Jimmy Carter, the Democratic candidate, won a state it would light up in red; if Gerald Ford, the Republican candidate, carried a state it would light up in blue. Chancellor, when asked about the color scheme, sought to tie the British Labour's red to the American Democrats while British Conservatives used blue as their ribbon color. By 2000, all the traditional broadcast networks had adopted the present model, though with the colors switched; red for Republicans (as both begin with the same letter), and blue for Democrats.

== Television career ==
- 1956–70 The Huntley-Brinkley Report (correspondent)
- 1961–62 The Today Show (anchor)
- 1970–82 NBC Nightly News (anchor)
- 1982–93 NBC Nightly News (editorial/commentary)

== Later years, post-Nightly News ==
Chancellor anchored the Nightly News through April 2, 1982, when he was succeeded by a co-anchor team of Tom Brokaw and Roger Mudd. Chancellor remained on the program, providing editorial commentaries until his retirement from NBC on July 9, 1993. During this time of his commentaries, he defined himself as a paragrapher in 1993, just before his retirement.

In 1992, Chancellor was inducted into the Television Hall of Fame.

Chancellor was the narrator of Baseball, a documentary by Ken Burns. He also wrote a book, Peril and Promise: A Commentary on America, which was published in 1990. The John Chancellor Award for Excellence in Journalism was established in 1995 and administered by the Annenberg Public Policy Center until 2004. It is now awarded by the Columbia University Graduate School of Journalism.

== Death ==
After his retirement, Chancellor moved to Princeton, New Jersey, where he died of stomach cancer July 12, 1996, two days before his 69th birthday.

== Honors ==
- 1977: Golden Plate Award of the American Academy of Achievement presented by Awards Council member Lowell Thomas
- 1983: Paul White Award, Radio Television Digital News Association
- 1988: Laureate of The Lincoln Academy of Illinois, Order of Lincoln
- 1993: Television Hall of Fame
- 1995: Primetime Emmy Award for Outstanding Informational Series (Baseball)

The author Anne Rivers Siddons gave her first book, a 1975 collection of nonfiction essays, the title John Chancellor Makes Me Cry.

Media offices
Preceded by Dave Garroway	Today Show Host; July 17, 1961 – September 14, 1962	Succeeded by Hugh Downs and Barbara Walters
Preceded by Chet Huntley and David Brinkley, The Huntley-Brinkley Report	NBC Nightly News Anchor; August 1, 1970 – April 2, 1982 (with David Brinkley and Frank McGee until August 8, 1971, solely until June 4, 1976, again with Brinkley until October 9, 1979, and with Washington sub-anchor Roger Mudd from November 17, 1980, until April 2, 1982.)	Succeeded by Tom Brokaw and Roger Mudd
