= Chris Vanocur =

American television journalist

- Education: Northwestern University (BS, Speech); University of Edinburgh (study abroad); Western Knight Fellow, University of Southern California
- Occupation: Television journalist
- Employer(s): WSYX/WTTE, Columbus, Ohio
- Notable work: Reporting on Salt Lake City Olympic bid scandal
- Parent: Sander Vanocur (father)
- Awards: George Foster Peabody Award (1998) duPont-Columbia Silver Baton; RTNDA Edward R. Murrow Award; Investigative Reporters and Editors award (1998)

Chris Vanocur is an American television journalist for WSYX/WTTE in Columbus, Ohio. He is a former reporter for KTVX.

Chris was honored with both a duPont-Columbia University Silver Baton and a George Foster Peabody Award for his role in uncovering Salt Lake City's Olympic bid scandal.

Chris was fired from KTVX in December 2012 when new owners let go several on-air reporters and most of the office staff. In 2013, Chris was hired by the ABC/FOX duopoly WSYX/WTTE in Columbus, Ohio as a senior reporter. He was named to the 2015 list of best state political reporters by the "Fix" section of the Washington Post.

He graduated from Northwestern University with a Bachelor of Science degree in speech in 1982. He studied abroad at University of Edinburgh. He was a Western Knight Fellow at University of Southern California. His father is Sander Vanocur.

== Awards ==
- 1998 George Foster Peabody Award
- Columbia University Dupont Silver Baton
- RTNDA Edward R. Murrow Award for Excellence in Reporting
- 1998 Investigative Reporters and Editors award
