= Stuart Novins =

American journalist

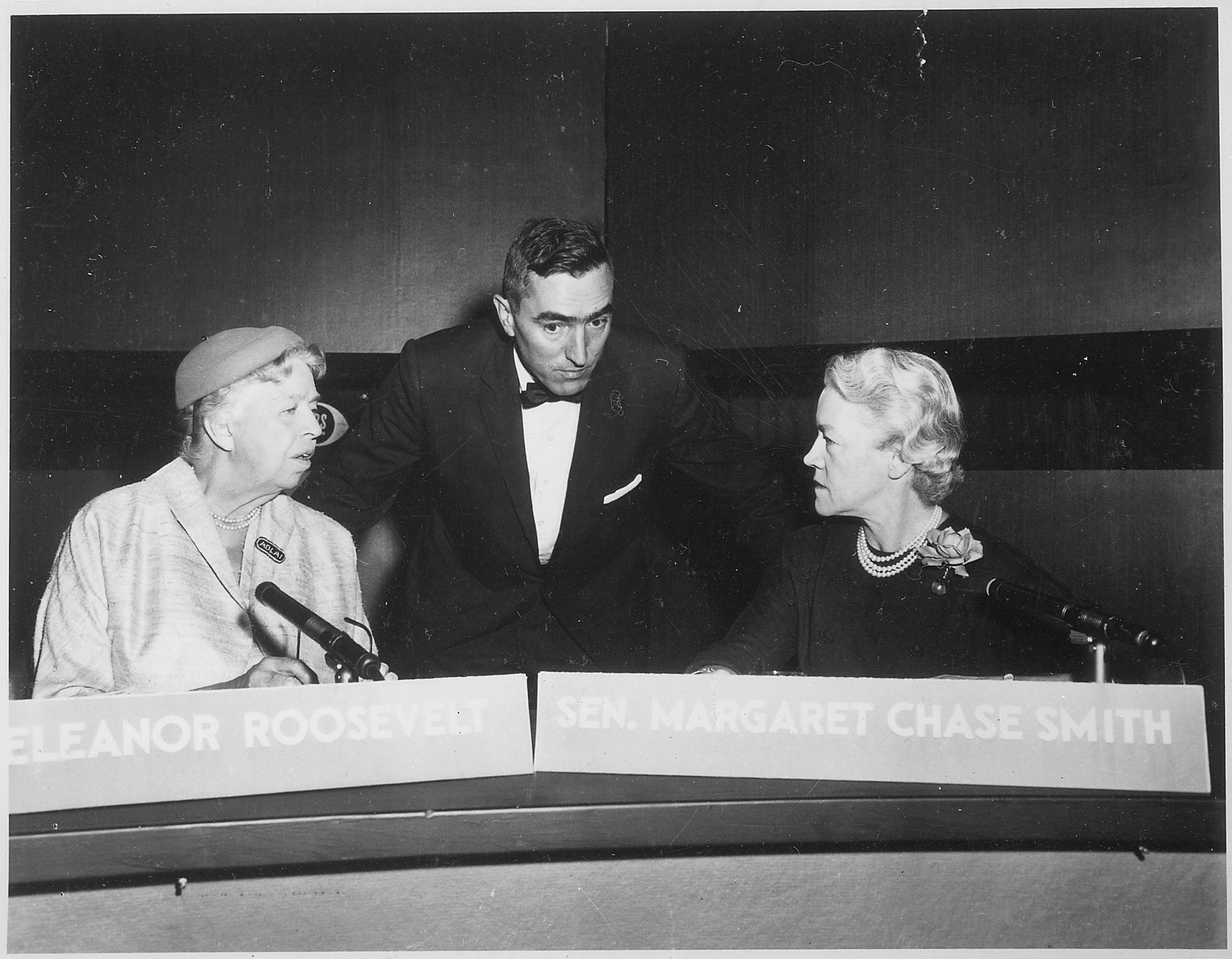
Stuart Novins with Eleanor Roosevelt and Margaret Chase Smith on Face the Nation in Washington, D.C. (1956)

Stuart Novins (March 30, 1914 – December 7, 1989) was an American television journalist. He was a CBS News correspondent for 35 years. Novins covered Fidel Castro's ascent to power in Cuba and later reported on the Bay of Pigs invasion. From 1958 to 1961 Novins was the CBS network's United Nations correspondent. In the 1960s as a Moscow correspondent, he covered the political collapse of Nikita Khrushchev. He was the chief of the CBS News bureau in Moscow from 1962 to 1965. As the second moderator for Face the Nation, he interviewed national as well as international world leaders. In 1960, the year he left his position on Face the Nation, he served as a panelist at the first televised presidential debate between Senator John F. Kennedy and Vice President Richard M. Nixon, which took place in Chicago at the studios of CBS-owned WBBM-TV. He retired from television in 1975 and joined the faculty at the University of New Mexico, where he taught broadcast journalism until 1981.

Novins died of respiratory failure on December 7, 1989, at age 75, in Middlebury, Vermont.

Preceded by Bill Shadel	Face the Nation Moderator; August 21, 1955 – November 6, 1960	Succeeded by Howard K. Smith
