= The Huntley–Brinkley Report =

American television news program (1956–1970)

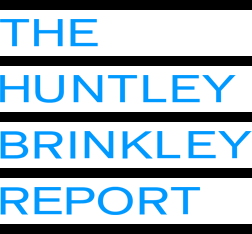
- Directed by: Norman A. Cook
- Presented by: Chet Huntley in New York City and David Brinkley in Washington, D.C.
- Theme music composer: Ludwig van Beethoven
- Ending theme: Symphony No. 9 in D Minor, Op. 125, second movement
- Country of origin: United States
- No. of episodes: 3,590

Production
- Executive producer: Wallace Westfeldt
- Producers: Lester Crystal; David Teitelbaum
- Editors: Henrik Krogius; Gilbert Millstien
- Running time: 15 minutes (1956–1963); 30 minutes (1963–1970)
- Production company: NBC News

Original release
- Network: NBC
- Release: October 29, 1956 – July 31, 1970

Related
- Camel News Caravan; NBC Nightly News

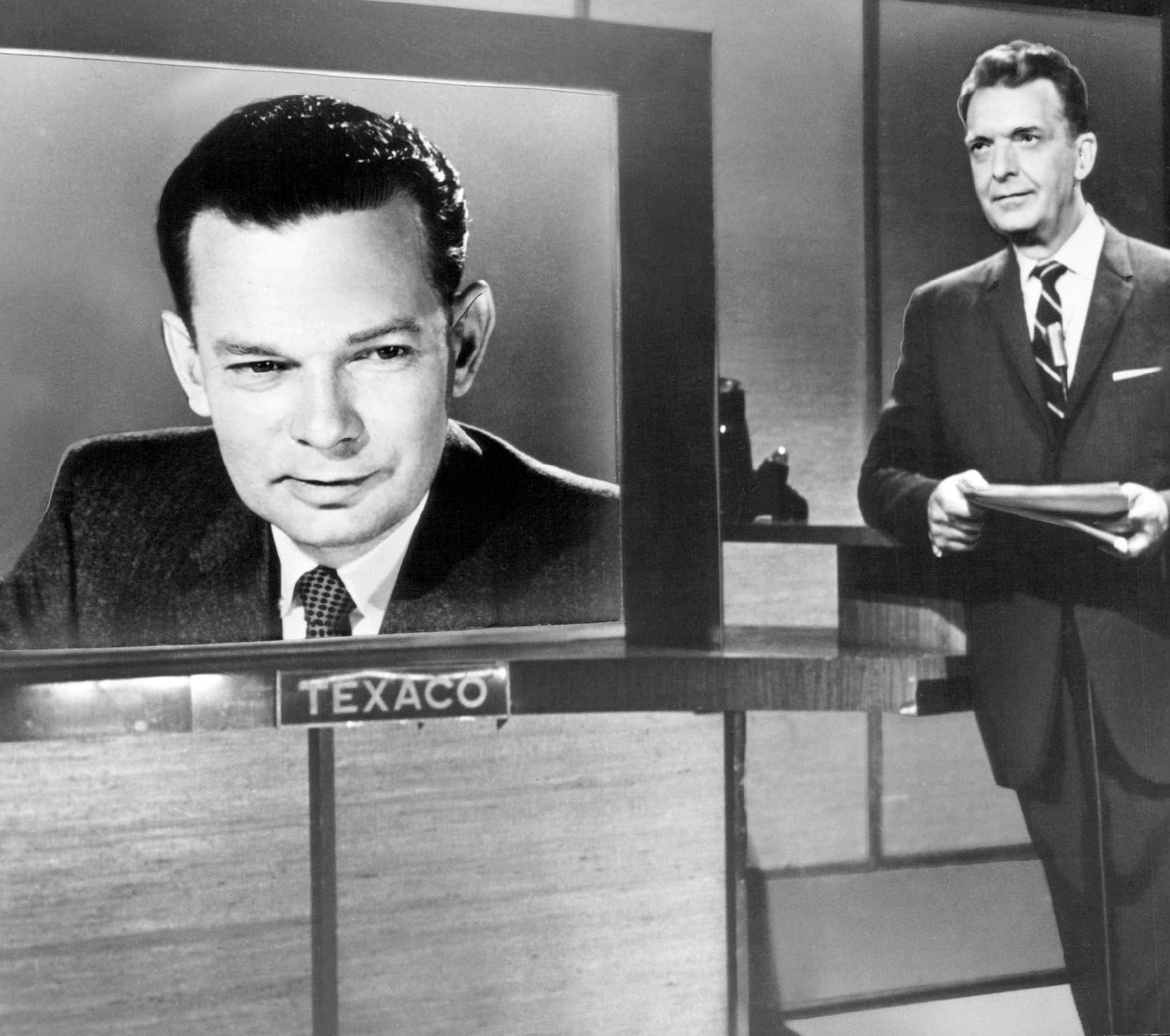
Chet Huntley (right) at NBC News' New York headquarters and David Brinkley on screen in Washington, D.C., June 1963.

The Huntley–Brinkley Report (sometimes known as The Texaco Huntley–Brinkley Report for one of its early sponsors) is an American television program broadcast by NBC. It was anchored by Chet Huntley in New York City and David Brinkley in Washington, D.C. It aired from October 29, 1956, to July 31, 1970, replacing Camel News Caravan and was replaced by NBC Nightly News. The program ran for 15 minutes at its inception but expanded to 30 minutes on September 9, 1963, exactly a week after the CBS Evening News with Walter Cronkite did so. It was developed and produced initially by Reuven Frank. Frank left the program in 1962 to produce documentaries (Eliot Frankel replaced him) but returned to the program the following year when it expanded to 30 minutes. He was succeeded as executive producer in 1965 by Robert "Shad" Northshield and by Wallace Westfeldt in 1969.

== Overview ==
=== Background ===
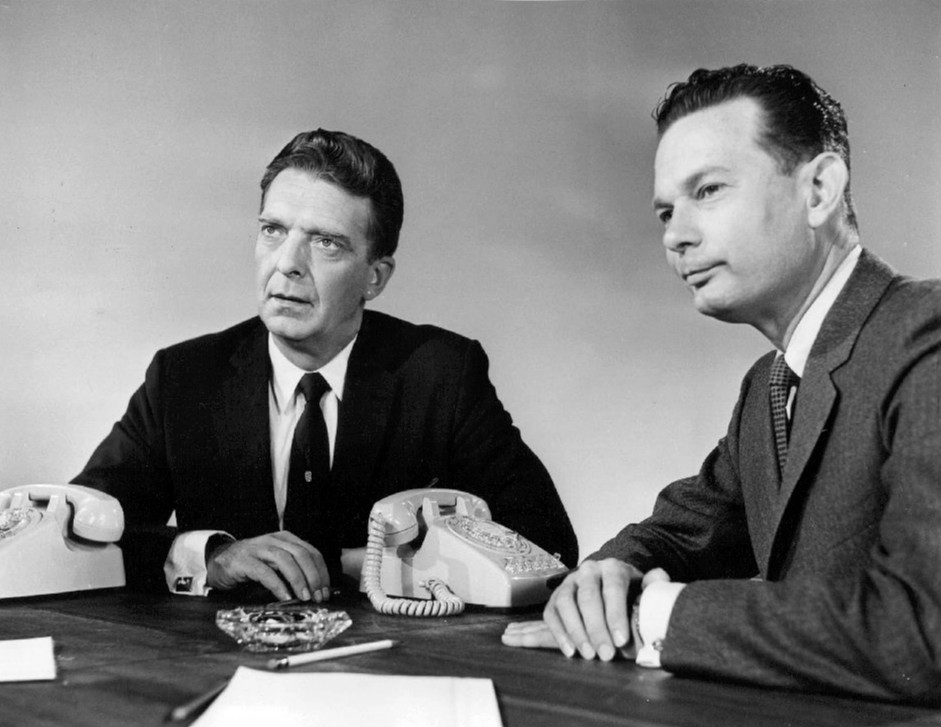
Huntley (left) and Brinkley (right) in 1965

By 1956, NBC executives had grown dissatisfied with John Cameron Swayze in his role anchoring the network's evening news program, which fell behind its main competition, CBS's Douglas Edwards with the News, in 1955. Network executive Ben Park suggested replacing Swayze with Chet Huntley and David Brinkley, who had garnered favorable attention anchoring NBC's coverage of the national political conventions that summer. Bill McAndrew, NBC's director of news (later NBC News president), had seen a highly rated local news program on NBC affiliate WSAZ-TV in Huntington, West Virginia, with an anchor in Huntington, along with a second anchor in the state capital of Charleston, a format which continues on WSAZ-TV today. He replaced Camel News Caravan with the Huntley-Brinkley Report, which premiered on October 29, 1956, with Huntley in New York and Brinkley in Washington. Producer Reuven Frank, who had advocated pairing Huntley and Brinkley for the convention coverage, thought using two anchors on a regular news program "was one of the dumber ideas I had ever heard."

Huntley handled the bulk of the news most nights, with Brinkley specializing in Washington-area topics such as the White House, U.S. Congress, and the Pentagon. (When one was on vacation the other would typically handle the full broadcast alone, leaving viewers with a familiar anchor instead of a little-known substitute such as a field reporter.) The closing credits music for the broadcast was the second movement (scherzo) of Beethoven's Ninth Symphony, from the 1952 studio recording with Arturo Toscanini conducting the NBC Symphony Orchestra.

=== Enter Texaco ===
Initially, the program lost audience from Swayze's program, and President Dwight D. Eisenhower let it be known that he was displeased by the switch. In the summer of 1957, the program had no advertisers. As its content improved, though, it began attracting critical praise and a larger audience, and by 1958, it had pulled even with CBS's program. The program received a big boost when, in June 1958, Texaco began purchasing all of its advertising, an arrangement that continued for three years.

=== Critical reception ===
Critics considered Huntley to possess one of the best broadcast voices ever heard, and Brinkley's dry, often witty, newswriting presented viewers a contrast to the often sober output from CBS News. The program received a Peabody Award in 1958 for "Outstanding Achievement in News," the awards committee noting that the anchors had "developed a mature and intelligent treatment of the news that has become a welcome and refreshing institution for millions of viewers." The program received the award again two years later in the same category, the committee concluding that Huntley and Brinkley had "dominated the news division of television so completely in the past year that it would be unthinkable to present a Peabody Award in that category to anybody else." By that time, the program had surpassed CBS's evening news program, Douglas Edwards with the News, in ratings and maintained higher viewership levels for much of the 1960s, even after Walter Cronkite took over CBS's competing program (initially named Walter Cronkite with the News on April 16, 1962, and renamed the CBS Evening News with Walter Cronkite on September 2, 1963). It received eight Emmy Awards in its 14-year run.

Huntley and Brinkley conveyed a strong chemistry, and a survey for NBC later found that viewers liked that the anchors talked to each other. In fact, aside from their sign-off, Huntley and Brinkley's only communication came when one anchor finished a story and handed off to the other by saying the other's name, a signal to an AT&T technician to switch the long-distance transmission lines from New York to Washington or vice versa. The anchors gained great celebrity, and surveys showed them better known than John Wayne, Cary Grant, Jimmy Stewart, or the Beatles. In 1961, Frank Sinatra and Milton Berle entertained a crowd in Washington by singing, to the tune of "Love and Marriage," "Huntley, Brinkley/Huntley, Brinkley/One is glum, the other quite twinkly." The anchors appeared on the cover of Newsweek on March 13, 1961, with a similar tagline, "TV's Huntley and Brinkley: One is Solemn, the Other Twinkly." The impact of The Huntley–Brinkley Report on popular culture of the 1960s can be illustrated by a verse from the 1965 song "So Long, Mom (A Song for World War III)" by the satirist Tom Lehrer:

While we're attacking frontally,
Watch Brink-a-ley and Hunt-a-ley
Describing contrapuntally
The cities we have lost...

Entertainer Sammy Davis Jr. was shown in a 1964 photograph watching The Huntley–Brinkley Report on a television backstage in his dressing room in Life magazine, who quoted him saying, "My only contact with reality. Whatever I'm doing, I stop to watch these guys."

=== Ratings ===
By 1965, the program brought in more advertising revenue than any other on television. On November 15 of that year, The Huntley–Brinkley Report became the first weekday network evening news program broadcast in color. The network's weekend programs, Saturday's Scherer-MacNeil Report and Sunday's Frank McGee Report, were also broadcast in color at that time.

The program's ratings slipped late in the decade as CBS's Walter Cronkite gained fame for his coverage of the space program, a field in which neither Huntley nor Brinkley had much interest (although Huntley and Brinkley occasionally participated in space coverage, another NBC newsman, Frank McGee, was the prime anchor of NBC's space coverage). Some contemporary observers at NBC felt the program began to slip after a 1967 strike by members of AFTRA. Brinkley honored the picket lines but Huntley, who viewed himself as "a newsman, not a performer" did not, remaining at the anchor desk. This split puzzled viewers, who had come to admire them for their teamwork. Unbeknownst to most viewers, that relationship was fairly limited—Huntley and Brinkley operated from different cities and rarely met in person, except for live coverage of political conventions, election nights, or a few other events.

=== Saturday evening broadcasts ===
For most of its run, The Huntley–Brinkley Report aired only Monday through Friday, but in January 1969, the network expanded it to Saturday evenings, with Huntley and Brinkley working solo on alternating weeks, although sometimes, the other would be seen in a taped essay or commentary recorded on Friday. On July 19, 1969, during the Apollo 11 mission, both co-anchored live (Huntley and Brinkley were commentators during NBC's coverage of the historic Moon landing, again with McGee as anchor). After the Saturday edition failed to garner sufficient ratings to justify two anchors, veteran correspondent Frank McGee took over as anchor, with Sander Vanocur substituting, although the broadcast kept the HBR name. The Frank McGee Report, a documentary program not tied to the day's news, aired on Sundays in the time slot.

On February 16, 1970, NBC announced that Huntley would retire later that year. Huntley and Brinkley concluded their final newscast together on July 31, 1970.

Upon Huntley's retirement, the network renamed the program the NBC Nightly News. Huntley died in 1974. Brinkley worked as co-anchor or commentator on Nightly News until 1981 when he departed for ABC News and its new weekly Sunday morning news program This Week. He died in 2003.

== In popular culture ==
The program was parodied in one of the most oft-seen segments of the early Jim Henson program Sam and Friends, which had originated from NBC-owned-and-operated WRC-TV in Washington, DC. Using audio from a broadcast of the show, puppet characters Hank and Frank lipsynch dialogue spoken by Huntley and Brinkley in response to original dialogue remarks by Kermit. The segment was sponsored by Esskay Meats in a bit performed by Harry the Hipster and a loudmouthed Professor Madcliffe.

Tom Lehrer's bitterly satirical "So Long Mom (A Song for World War III)" mentions the pair: "While we're attacking frontally watch Brinkaly and Huntaly recounting contrapuntally the cities we have lost..."

== See also ==
- Walter Balderson
- Robert Conley

== Notes ==
Inline citations

Bibliography

- Frank, Reuven (1991). Out of Thin Air: The Brief Wonderful Life of Network News. New York: Simon & Schuster. ISBN 9780671677589.
- Matusow, Barbara (1983). The Evening Stars: The Making of the Network News Anchor. Boston: Houghton Mifflin Company. ISBN 9780395339688.
- Johnston, Lyle (2003). Good Night, Chet: A Biography of Chet Huntley. Jefferson, NC.: McFarland Publishers.
