= David Brinkley =

American journalist (1920–2003)

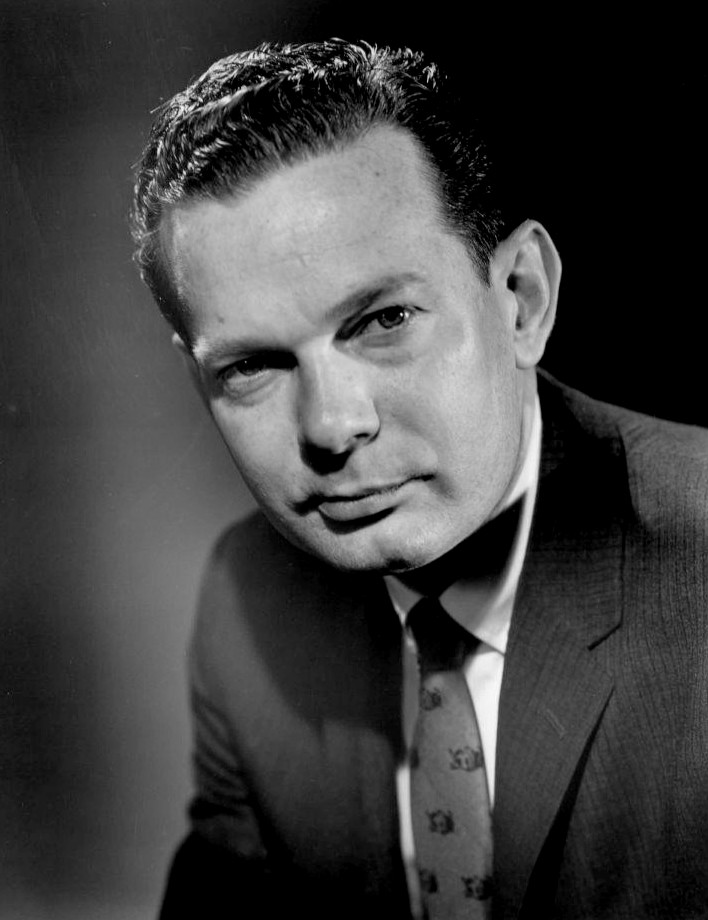
- Brinkley in 1962
- Born: David McClure Brinkley; July 10, 1920; Wilmington, North Carolina, U.S.
- Died: June 11, 2003 (aged 82); Houston, Texas, U.S.
- Resting place: Oakdale Cemetery
- Occupation: Television news anchor
- Years active: 1943–1997
- Spouses: Ann Fischer (m. 1946; div. 1972) Susan Adolph (m. 1972)
- Children: 4

David McClure Brinkley (July 10, 1920 – June 11, 2003) was an American newscaster for NBC and ABC in a career lasting from 1943 to 1997.

From 1956 through 1970, he co-anchored NBC's top-rated nightly news program, The Huntley–Brinkley Report, with Chet Huntley and thereafter appeared as co-anchor or commentator on its successor, NBC Nightly News, through the 1970s. In the 1980s and 1990s, Brinkley was host of the popular Sunday This Week with David Brinkley program and a top commentator on election-night coverage for ABC News. Over the course of his career, Brinkley received ten Emmy Awards, three George Foster Peabody Awards, and the Presidential Medal of Freedom.

He wrote three books, including the 1988 bestseller Washington Goes to War, about how World War II transformed the nation's capital. His books were largely based on his own observations as a young reporter in the city.

== Early life ==
Brinkley was born in Wilmington, North Carolina, the youngest of five children born to William Graham Brinkley and Mary MacDonald (née West) Brinkley. He began writing for a local newspaper, the Wilmington Morning Star, while still attending New Hanover High School. He attended the University of North Carolina at Chapel Hill, Emory University, and Vanderbilt University, before entering service in the U.S. Army in 1940. Following a medical discharge, Brinkley worked for United Press International in several of its Southern bureaus. In 1943, he moved to Washington, D.C., looking for a radio job at CBS News. Instead, Brinkley took a job at NBC News, became its White House correspondent, and in time began appearing on television.

== Career ==
In 1952, Brinkley began providing Washington reporting on NBC Television's evening news program, the Camel News Caravan (the name changed over time), hosted by John Cameron Swayze. In 1956, NBC News executives considered various possibilities to anchor the network's coverage of the Democratic and Republican political conventions, and when executive J. Davidson Taylor suggested pairing two reporters (he had in mind Bill Henry and Ray Scherer), producer Reuven Frank, who favored Brinkley for the job, and NBC's director of news, Joseph Meyers, who favored Chet Huntley, proposed combining Huntley and Brinkley. NBC's top brass consented, but they had so little confidence in the team that they withheld announcing it for two months. Their concern proved unfounded.

The pairing worked so well that on October 29, 1956, the two took over NBC's flagship nightly newscast, with Huntley in New York City and Brinkley in Washington, D.C., for the newly christened Huntley–Brinkley Report. Brinkley's dry wit offset the serious tone set by Huntley, and the program proved popular with audiences turned off by the incessantly serious tone of CBS's news broadcasts of that era. Brinkley's ability to write for the ear with simple, declarative sentences gained him a reputation as one of the medium's most talented writers, and his connections in Washington led CBS's Roger Mudd to observe, "Brinkley, of all the TV guys here, probably has the best sense of the city — best understands its moods and mentality. He knows Washington and he knows the people." Most often described as "wry", Brinkley once suggested on the air that the best way to resolve the controversy over whether to change the name of Boulder Dam to "Hoover Dam" was to have former president Herbert Hoover change his name to "Herbert Boulder".

Another example of Brinkley's wryness was evinced on the third night of Chicago's infamous Democratic Convention of 1968. After continuous abuses of NBC correspondents made on the floor of the convention — namely, interference and shadowing of the media staff by supporters of Hubert Humphrey, presumably with connections to political boss Richard J. Daley — Brinkley criticized Daley's alleged interference with freedom of the press following Senator Abraham Ribicoff's stormy nomination of George McGovern. Perhaps in reply to a control room request for objectivity and alluding to Daley's refusal to be interviewed by NBC's John Chancellor earlier in the evening, Brinkley was heard over the noise of the McGovern demonstration saying, "Mayor Daley had his chance!" (i.e., "now give the McGovern people theirs").

External videos
- Booknotes interview with Brinkley on A Memoir, December 10, 1995, C-SPAN

Huntley and Brinkley's nightly sign-off — "Good night, Chet," Brinkley would intone; "Good night, David," Huntley would reply — entered popular usage and was followed by the beginning of the second movement of Beethoven's 9th Symphony as the program credits rolled. The Huntley–Brinkley Report was America's most popular television newscast until it was overtaken, at the end of the 1960s, by the CBS Evening News, anchored by Walter Cronkite. Brinkley and his co-anchor gained such celebrity that Brinkley was forced to cut short his reporting on Hubert Humphrey in the 1960 West Virginia primary because West Virginians were more interested in meeting Brinkley than the candidate. From 1961 to 1963, Brinkley anchored a prime time news magazine, David Brinkley's Journal. Produced by Ted Yates, the program won a George Foster Peabody Award and two Emmy Awards.

On November 22, 1963, Brinkley helped cover the Assassination of President John F. Kennedy for NBC News from Washington. He opened the Huntley-Brinkley Report that night by saying "Good evening. The essential facts are these: President Kennedy was murdered in Dallas, Texas. He was shot by a sniper hiding in a building near his parade route. He was dead within an hour. Lyndon Johnson is President of the United States". Later that night, after the news of the President's death was confirmed, Brinkley said in a commentary at around 1:00 the next morning: "It has all been shocking, but perhaps one element in the shock was the speed. At a little after one o'clock this afternoon President Kennedy was as about as alive as any human being ever gets. Young, strong, vigorous, looking forward to another 5 years of leadership of this country and of the western world... By 6:00 President Kennedy had been murdered, Lyndon Johnson was President of the United States, Mrs. Kennedy was a widow, a brave and composed one no could fail to admire, all of them were back in Washington... In about 4 hours we had gone from President Kennedy in Dallas alive, to back in Washington dead, and a new President in his place. There is no more news here tonight and really no more to say, except what has happened today has been too much, too ugly and too fast".

When Huntley retired from the anchor chair in 1970, the evening news program was renamed NBC Nightly News, and Brinkley co-anchored the broadcast with John Chancellor and Frank McGee. In 1971, Chancellor was named sole anchor, and Brinkley became the program's commentator, delivering three-minute perspectives several times a week under a reprise of the earlier title, David Brinkley's Journal. By 1976, though, NBC had decided to revive the dual-anchor format, and Brinkley once again anchored the Washington desk for the network until October 1979. But the early years of Nightly News never achieved the popularity of Huntley-Brinkley Report, and none of several news magazine shows anchored by Brinkley during the 1970s succeeded. An unhappy Brinkley left NBC in 1981; NBC Magazine was his last show for that network.

Almost immediately, Brinkley was offered a job at ABC. ABC News president Roone Arledge was anxious to replace ABC's Sunday morning talk show, Issues and Answers, which had always lagged far behind CBS's Face the Nation and NBC's Meet the Press. Brinkley was tapped for the job and in 1981 began hosting This Week with David Brinkley. This Week revolutionized the Sunday morning news program format, featuring not only several correspondents interviewing guest newsmakers, but concluding with a roundtable discussion. The format proved highly successful and was soon imitated by ABC's NBC and CBS rivals as well as engendering new programs originating both nationally and from local stations.

For a brief period after Washington-based World News Tonight anchor Frank Reynolds was diagnosed with hepatitis that ultimately claimed his life on July 20, 1983, Brinkley returned to the network anchor desk as Reynolds' substitute from Washington. This arrangement lasted until July 4; when Reynolds' eventual successor as the network anchor, Peter Jennings, was brought in from his post in London.

As part of ABC's commemoration of World War II, Brinkley and the News division produced the special, The Battle of the Bulge: 50 Years On, with Brinkley hosting and interviewing survivors of the battle, Allied and Axis. The special, which aired at Christmas 1994, was critically acclaimed and widely viewed.

== Retirement ==
Days before Brinkley's retirement from regular news coverage, Brinkley made a rare, on-air mistake during evening coverage of the 1996 United States presidential election at a moment when he thought he was on commercial break. One of his colleagues asked him what he thought of the prospects for Bill Clinton's re-election. He called Clinton "a bore" and added, "The next four years will be filled with pretty words and pretty music and a lot of goddamn nonsense!" Peter Jennings soon pointed out that they were still on the air. Brinkley said, "Really?! Well, I'm leaving anyway!". Brinkley blamed only himself for the hot mic incident. While it was pushed for Brinkley to offer an apology to Clinton, he declined, stating that while what he said was "stupid", he had meant what he had said. Instead, he called people connected to Clinton and he agreed to say a few words for an interview where he would state "It was not polite to you" about what he said in the context of being polite to guests.

Brinkley's last broadcast as host of This Week was November 10, 1996, but he continued to provide short pieces of commentary for the show until September 28, 1997. He then fully retired from television.

In addition to ten Emmys and three Peabodys, Brinkley received the Alfred I. duPont Award in 1958. In 1982, he received the Paul White Award for lifetime achievement from the Radio Television Digital News Association. In 1988, he was inducted into the Television Hall of Fame. In 1992, President George H. W. Bush awarded him the Presidential Medal of Freedom, the nation's highest civilian honor. Bush called him "the elder statesman of broadcast journalism". In an interview in 1992, he said, "Most of my life, I've simply been a reporter covering things and writing and talking about it."

== Personal life ==
David Brinkley married the former Flora Ann Fischer in 1946 and had three sons; they divorced in 1972. Brinkley married Susan Melanie Benfer the same year. Their marriage lasted until Brinkley's death.

Brinkley was the father of the late historian and former Columbia University provost Alan Brinkley and the late Stanford journalism professor and Pulitzer Prize–winning writer Joel Brinkley.

== Death ==
Brinkley died at his home in Houston on June 11, 2003, from complications of a fall suffered at his vacation home in Jackson Hole, Wyoming, according to his son, John Brinkley. His body is interred at Oakdale Cemetery, Wilmington, North Carolina.

== Television career ==
- 1951–1956 Camel News Caravan (correspondent)
- 1956–1970 NBC News/The Huntley–Brinkley Report
- 1961–1963 David Brinkley's Journal, Wednesday 10:30–11:00 p.m. EST
- 1971–1976 NBC Nightly News (commentator only)
- 1976–1979 NBC Nightly News (co-anchor)
- 1980–1981 NBC Magazine with David Brinkley
- 1981–1996 This Week with David Brinkley
- 1981–1997 ABC World News Tonight (commentator)
- 1991 Pearl Harbor: Two Hours That Changed The World with David Brinkley (50th anniversary)
- 1994 David Brinkley Reports: The Battle of the Bulge; 50 Years On
- 1996–1997 This Week (commentator)

== Bibliography ==
- Washington Goes to War, 1988 ISBN 034540730X
- Everyone Is Entitled to My Opinion, 1991 ISBN 0345409523
- David Brinkley: A Memoir, 1995 ISBN 0345374029
- Brinkley's Beat: People, Places, and Events That Shaped My Time, 2003 ISBN 0345426797

Media offices
Preceded by John Cameron Swayze (as Camel News Caravan)	NBC evening news anchors (as The Huntley-Brinkley Report); October 29, 1956 – July 31, 1970 (with Chet Huntley)	Succeeded by John Chancellor, Frank McGee, and David Brinkley
Preceded by Chet Huntley and David Brinkley (as The Huntley-Brinkley Report)	NBC evening news anchors (as the NBC Nightly News); August 1, 1970 – August 8, 1971 (with John Chancellor and Frank McGee)	Succeeded by John Chancellor
Preceded by John Chancellor	NBC evening news anchors (as the NBC Nightly News); June 7, 1976 – October 4, 1979 (with John Chancellor)	Succeeded by John Chancellor
First	This Week anchor November 15, 1981 – November 10, 1996	Succeeded by Sam Donaldson and Cokie Roberts
