= Frank McGee (journalist) =

American television journalist (1921–1974)

- McGee in 1962
- Born: September 12, 1921; Monroe, Louisiana, U.S.
- Died: April 17, 1974 (aged 52); New York City, U.S.
- Education: University of Oklahoma
- Occupation: News anchor
- Years active: 1945–1974
- Notable credit(s): NBC Nightly News (1970–1971); The Today Show (1971–1974)
- Spouse: Nialta Sue Beaird (m. 1941)
- Children: 2

Frank McGee (September 12, 1921 – April 17, 1974) was an American television journalist, best known for his work with NBC from the late 1950s into the early 1970s.

== Early life and education ==
McGee was born in Monroe, Louisiana, and raised in Norman, Oklahoma. His father was an oil field worker.

In 1940, he joined the Oklahoma National Guard, and he served in the U.S. Army in World War II. After World War II, he attended the University of California and the University of Oklahoma.

== Career ==
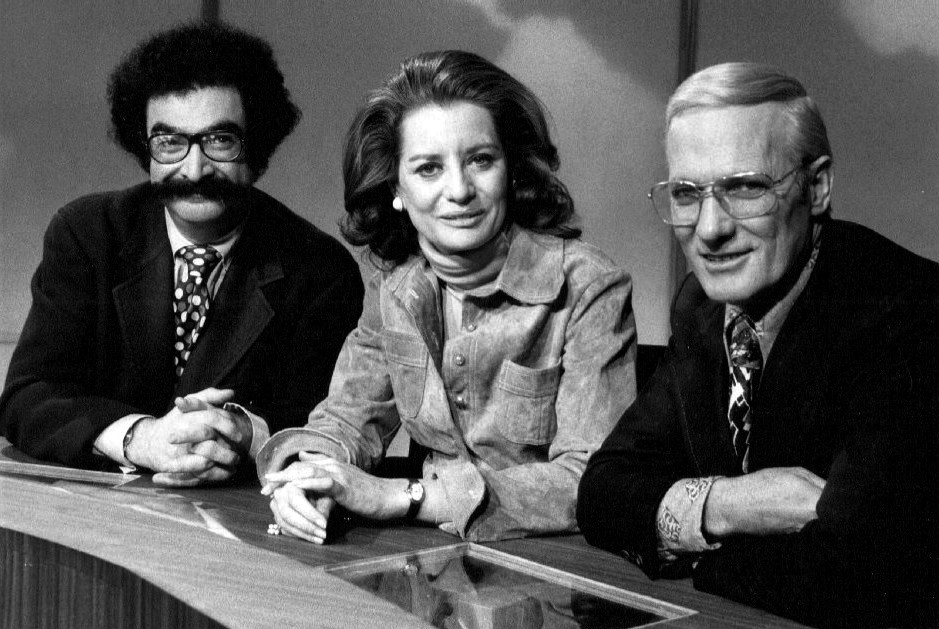
Gene Shalit, Barbara Walters, and McGee on The Today Show in 1973

McGee began his broadcast news career at KGFF in Shawnee, Oklahoma, in 1946 then moved to WKY-TV, now KFOR-TV, in Oklahoma City, Oklahoma, under the stage name Mack Rogers. In 1955, the owners of WKY purchased WSFA-TV in Montgomery, Alabama, and sent McGee there as news director. WSFA was an affiliate of NBC. As the civil rights movement gained national coverage, McGee's work came to the notice of NBC, which offered him a position with the network, based in New York City. He went on to become "one of television's most prominent newsmen".

McGee was a floor correspondent for the national conventions of both political parties in 1960, 1964, and 1968, one member of the so-called "Four Horsemen" that included NBC newsmen John Chancellor, Edwin Newman, and Sander Vanocur. In 1960, he moderated the second debate between presidential candidates John F. Kennedy and Richard Nixon on October 7 in Washington, D.C. At that time, the debates were considered by the news media to have swung the election in favor of Kennedy among voters who watched them on television.

McGee had a great talent for descriptive language, often giving viewers a vivid word picture of the day's events. When NBC News colleague Chet Huntley broke the news of the assassination of John F. Kennedy on November 22, 1963, McGee appeared in the studio with Huntley and Bill Ryan. Correspondent Robert MacNeil reported by telephone from Dallas, but the flash studio in New York was not equipped to put telephone calls on the air. This was eventually accomplished, but for the first hour, MacNeil spoke to McGee over the telephone, and McGee then repeated MacNeil's report to the viewing audience. During MacNeil's report that the president had died, his comments were finally heard over the air, but McGee, unaware of the change, repeated them anyway. The veteran journalist remained on duty for 45 hours with little rest, reporting without a script. McGee was also on the air in 1968 when word came of the assassination of Robert F. Kennedy following the California primary, and he calmly anchored the network's breaking news coverage.

In the early 1960s, he also served as a news reporter and host (referred to as "communicators") on the NBC Radio weekend show Monitor. He is most noted for his interview on that program with Martin Luther King Jr. and for asking him how he felt about being targeted for assassination. King calmly told McGee he had given serious thought of the possibility. McGee also was a featured anchor during NBC's coverage of the early U.S. crewed space flights.

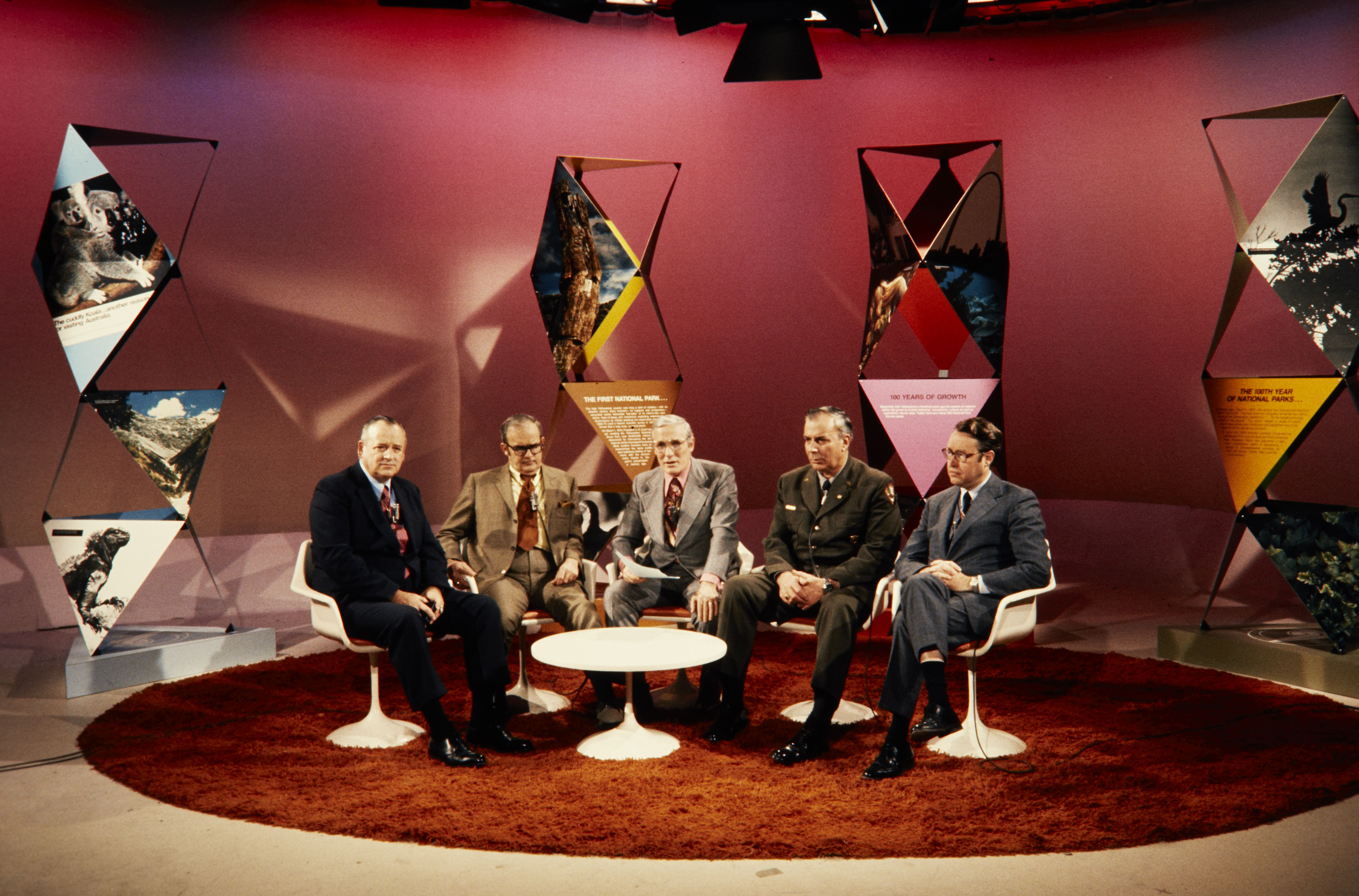
NPS staff sitting on the set for the 1972 Centennial for the creation of the first National Park, in a NBC Today Show. Left to right: George Hartzog is the first from left and Frank McGee himself is in the middle.

In 1967, McGee lived with members of the 101st Airborne Division in Vietnam for almost a month to report for Same Mud, Same Blood, a documentary about black soldiers in Vietnam. McGee was perhaps best known in the middle and late 1960s for hosting The Frank McGee Report, seen early Saturday and Sunday evenings. The half-hour program generally gave more attention to one or more topics than a regular newscast, sometimes employing a full documentary format. In 1969, NBC began a traditional Saturday evening newscast, and in 1970, a Sunday version, both of which replaced The Report. McGee, however, often anchored those weekend newscasts. For several months in 1970, McGee also anchored the New York City WNBC-TV local 6 p.m. newscast.

In 1970, after Huntley's retirement ended The Huntley-Brinkley Report, McGee became one of a platoon of three anchors on the newly renamed NBC Nightly News, along with Chancellor and David Brinkley. When the network settled on Chancellor as permanent anchor the next year, McGee moved to The Today Show in 1971, replacing Hugh Downs, who had hosted the program since 1962. McGee moved Today into a more serious news presentation, insisting on opening and closing the show by himself while sharing other duties with co-host Barbara Walters. He also insisted that he, and not Walters, ask guests the first three questions if both of them were doing an interview, according to Walters.

== Personal life ==
McGee married Nialta Sue Beaird on January 25, 1941. They had a son and a daughter. In late 1973, McGee left his wife for a production assistant, Mamye Smith, although it does not appear that he and his wife ever divorced.

== Death ==
McGee last appeared on Today on April 11, 1974, six days before his death at the age of 52 from complications from multiple myeloma, a type of bone cancer. Following that last show, he checked himself into Columbia-Presbyterian Medical Center in New York City; his immune system was weakened by chemotherapy and radiation treatment, and he died of an overwhelming pneumonia. He was succeeded by another Oklahoma native, Jim Hartz, who co-hosted the show with Walters until 1976, when Tom Brokaw and Jane Pauley arrived.

McGee and his wife Sue (1921–2002) are buried at Saint Paul's Episcopal Churchyard in Woodville, Virginia.

== Video ==
- YouTube – Frank McGee signing off for NBC News, on November 22, 1963

Media offices
| Preceded by Hugh Downs with Barbara Walters | Today Show Host with Barbara Walters; October 4, 1971–April 16, 1974 | Succeeded by Jim Hartz |
| Preceded by Chet Huntley and David Brinkley (as the Huntley-Brinkley Report) | NBC evening news anchors (as the NBC Nightly News); 1970-71; Co-Anchor with John Chancellor and David Brinkley | Succeeded by John Chancellor |
