= John Cameron Swayze =

American news commentator and game show panelist (1906–1995)

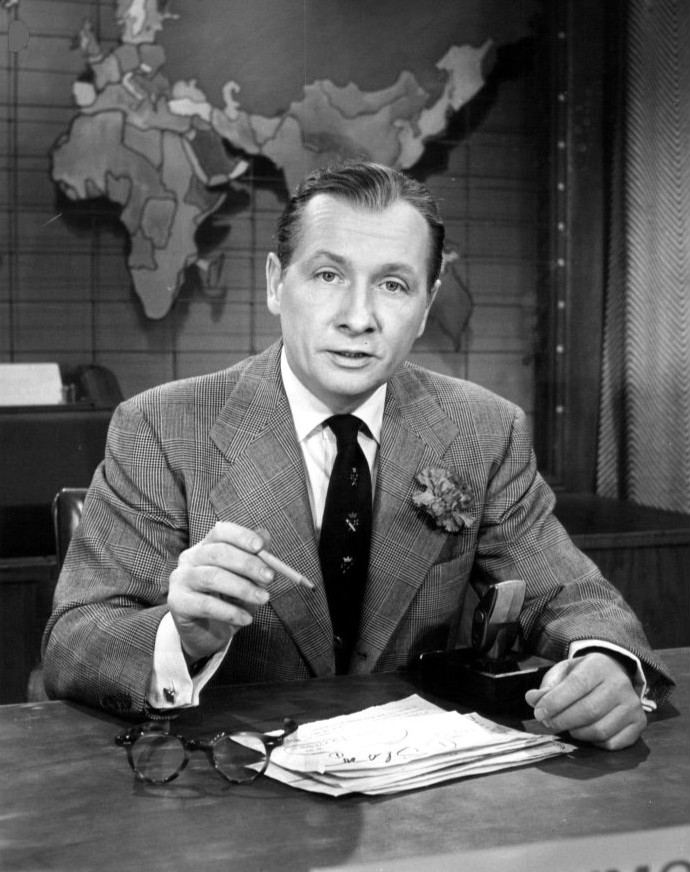
- NBC's Camel News Caravan in 1955
- Born: April 4, 1906; Wichita, Kansas, U.S.
- Died: August 15, 1995 (aged 89); Sarasota, Florida, U.S.
- Occupations: News presenter; reporter; game show panelist
- Years active: 1940–1985
- Spouse: Beulah Mae Estes (m. 1935)
- Children: 1 son, 1 daughter

John Cameron Swayze (April 4, 1906 – August 15, 1995) was an American anchorman, news commentator, and game show panelist during the 1940s and 1950s. He later became best known as a product spokesman.

== Early life ==
Born in Wichita, Kansas, Swayze was the son of a wholesale drug salesman. He attended school in Atchison, Kansas, and at Culver Military Academy. He left the school before graduating, opting instead for work in radio.

Swayze first sought to work as an actor, but his activity on Broadway ended when acting roles became scarce following the Wall Street crash of 1929.

== Career ==
=== Early years ===
Swayze returned to the Midwest and worked for the Kansas City Journal-Post as a reporter and as radio editor. From the newsroom, he narrated bulletins for broadcast by Kansas City radio station KMBZ via a microphone the station had placed at the newspaper. On September 27, 1933, he also began the radio program Stranger Than Fiction. In addition, Swayze worked in sports, writing about and broadcasting football games, and took part in early experimental television broadcasts.

Swayze began working full-time doing news updates for KMBZ in 1940. He broadcast news items prepared by United Press Kansas City bureau overnight editor Walter Cronkite.

=== Network ===
In 1946, Swayze went to Hollywood, where NBC hired him as director of news and special events for its Western Division.

NBC transferred Swayze to New York City, where he proposed a radio quiz program he called Who Said That Quote. Some sources claim that the show was first proposed and edited by Fred W. Friendly, later of CBS News, who co-produced it with his first wife, Dorothy Greene. In the series, celebrities tried to determine the speaker of quotations taken from recent news reports.

NBC premiered the radio program, re-titled Who Said That?, in October 1948. It subsequently also ran on television, from December 1948 until July 1955. Swayze was a permanent panel member of the show and was referred to as the anchorman in what may be the first usage of this term on television.

NBC appointed Swayze the host of its national political convention coverage in 1948, the first commercial coverage ever by television. (NBC Television did broadcast the 1940 Republican National Convention from Philadelphia on a noncommercial, semi-experimental basis, seen in just three cities: Philadelphia, New York City and Schenectady, NY.)

=== Anchor ===
In 1948, NBC produced The Camel Newsreel Theatre, a 10-minute program of daily events using newsreel film, which Swayze narrated and often scripted. It was a precursor of the modern television network news program, sponsored by R. J. Reynolds Tobacco Company, maker of Camel cigarettes.

In February 1949, NBC premiered the 15-minute Camel News Caravan, with Swayze appearing on screen. It was the first NBC news program to use NBC-filmed news stories rather than movie newsreels. Swayze read items from the news wires and periodically interviewed newsmakers, but he is remembered best for reporting on the Korean War nightly and for his two catchphrases: "Let's go hopscotching the world for headlines" and his signoff: "That's the story, folks—glad we could get together."

Veteran broadcaster David Brinkley wrote in a memoir that Swayze got the job because of his ability to memorize scripts, which allowed him to recite the news when the primitive teleprompters of the time failed to work properly. Walter Cronkite also credited Swayze with an amazing memory, able to recite the news without resorting to a script.

In early 1955, R.J. Reynolds reduced its sponsorship of the Camel News Caravan to three days a week. Chrysler's Plymouth division sponsored the other days, and on those days the program was titled the Plymouth News Caravan. Eventually, NBC executives tired of Swayze's flamboyant delivery style, in contrast to anchorman Douglas Edwards's comparatively low-key delivery. His rival broadcast on CBS, Douglas Edwards with the News, began to attract Swayze's viewers, hurting his ratings. In 1956, Swayze was dismissed in favor of the new team of Chet Huntley and David Brinkley. By 1959, The Huntley-Brinkley Report soon became the nation's top-rated television newscast. CBS replaced Edwards in April 1962 with Walter Cronkite.

=== Other TV roles ===
From 1955 to 1957, Swayze hosted and narrated the long-running television drama series The Armstrong Circle Theatre (1950–1963). He hosted the ABC daytime television game show Chance for Romance as well as the syndicated travel program It's a Wonderful World (1963). Swayze was also a substitute host on the television game show To Tell the Truth (1956–1968).

== Product spokesman ==
Over a period of twenty years beginning in 1956, Swayze became widely known as the commercial spokesman for Timex watches, and for the slogan "It takes a licking and keeps on ticking." In one of these commercials, performed live, he strapped the watch to the propeller blades of an outboard motor, lowered it into a tank of water and ran the motor for a few seconds. When he pulled the motor out of the water and tipped up the blades, the watch was missing. Unfazed, he ad libbed, "It's probably on the bottom of the tank–still ticking." Swayze performed in Timex commercials that were mock newscasts before delivering the trademark catchphrase.

Swayze appeared in commercials for auto manufacturer Studebaker, promoting the company's 1963 "Standard" model.

He also appeared in a Volvo television commercial, driven in an early 1970s two-door model on a muddy racetrack by a professional rally driver. In a tip of the hat to Swayze's Timex commercials (and also to Volvo's own reputation for ruggedness and reliability), the announcer intones, "We've strapped John Cameron Swayze to this stock, standard Volvo to demonstrate just how much this man can take."

Swayze appeared in a 1984 commercial for radio station WHTZ in New York City, which was broadcast in other markets promoting different radio stations.

== Popular culture ==
He was satirized by comics Bill Buchanan and Dickie Goodman, whose first "break-in" novelty record (a mock newscast spliced with current rock and roll music), "The Flying Saucer," satirized him as reporter John Cameron Cameron (played by Goodman). Swayze is referenced in a lyric of Allan Sherman's novelty song "My Grandfather's Watch," a parody of "My Grandfather's Clock" by Henry Clay Work.

In 1980, Ray Stevens recorded a novelty song titled "The Watch Song," in which his character, in a bar, is approached by a cowboy whose wife he's been seeing and who challenges him to a fight. Outside, in the course of the fight, the cowboy stomps on the watch and busts it beyond repair. In the refrain, Ray's character calls out to John Cameron Swayze (who, in a series of 1960s commercials, would subject a Timex watch to a grueling physical test, then show it still to be ticking away) to tell him how crazy it sounds to say that the cowboy had busted a watch that had been shot at, dipped in beer, and tied to a motorboat and dragged on a beach. At the sight of his busted watch, Ray's character freaks out and beats the cowboy to death.

Swayze made periodic cameo appearances in movies beginning with 1957's Face in the Crowd and the first scene of 1968's "The Boston Strangler", a newscast about Boston's parade celebrating the feats of the John Glenn's Mercury orbit.

Swayze was fairly frequently mentioned on the television series The Golden Girls. In episode 805 of Mystery Science Theater 3000, when the watch of a character in the movie The Thing That Couldn't Die is found in a traderat's nest, Tom Servo exclaims: "John Cameron Traderat".

In the 1940s scene of the 1994–present version of Walt Disney's Carousel of Progress at Walt Disney World's Magic Kingdom, John extols the virtues of television, stating "I kind of like it, you know? A guy named John Cameron Swayze gives us all the news and then they have all this singing and dancing. A lot of fluff, but it's fun."

For over 20 years, Swayze was the spokesman for Timex watch commercials and was one of the most recognized personalities on television. Swayze's line at the end of each commercial, "It takes a licking and keeps on ticking," became an iconic phrase and part of American pop culture.

== Honors ==
In 1950, Swayze received the Alfred I. duPont Award.

== Personal life ==
Swayze was the son of Jesse Ernest Swayze and Christine Cameron, a.k.a. Camerona (cited by some sources). His father's name is of Norman French origin and dates back to Dorset, England, in the early 17th century. He married Beulah Mae Estes in 1935. He died in Sarasota, Florida, on August 15, 1995.

Swayze and the actor-brothers Patrick Swayze and Don Swayze were sixth cousins once removed. Their fathers were descendants by seven generations of Judge Samuel Swayze and his wife, Penelope Horton. Judge Swayze was the son of Joseph Swasey and his wife Mary Betts. Mary Betts was the daughter of Captain Richard Betts and his wife, Joanna Chamberlayne. Other noteworthy relations descending from the Betts or Swayze lineages are actors William Holden and Tom Hulce, and Evgenia Citkowitz, widow of actor Julian Sands.

Media offices
Preceded by Originator	NBC evening news anchors (as the Camel News Caravan); February 1949 – October 26, 1956	Succeeded by Chet Huntley and David Brinkley (as the Huntley-Brinkley Report)
Preceded by John Charles Daly	ABC Evening News News anchor 1960 – 1962	Succeeded by Ron Cochran
