= Bill Shadel =

American broadcast journalist (1908–2005)

- Born: Willard Franklin "Bill" Shadel; July 31, 1908; Milton, Wisconsin, U.S.
- Died: January 29, 2005 (aged 96); Renton, Washington, U.S.
- Resting place: Milton Junction Cemetery, Milton Junction, Wisconsin; 42°46′59.4222″N 88°57′28.2558″W
- Education: Andrews University
- Occupations: Journalist; radio broadcaster
- Known for: On-the-spot radio reports from London and other locations in Europe during World War II.
- Spouse(s): Marion Kocher; Julie Strouse
- Children: 4

Willard Franklin Shadel (July 31, 1908 – January 29, 2005) was an American news anchor for CBS Radio and ABC Television.

Shadel was born in Milton, Wisconsin, one of five children and the younger of two sons of Franklin Luther and Ida Louise Pachel Shadel. He was musically talented and in his early years provided music for silent movies. He graduated from Andrews University in Michigan. Shadel assumed direction of the college band and orchestra in 1929, while still a student and then worked as an assistant program manager for the college's radio station, responsible for music presentations that included his performing as a soloist on marimba, saxophone, clarinet, and trombone and him directing bands and choirs for the station. His work as a soloist and with these groups, which also gave programs for the school, was an immediate hit with their members and the campus at large.

While at Andrews University, he married Marion I. Kocher and they had two sons, Willard F., Jr. and Gerald I. He led the groups for two years following his graduation in 1932, while teaching political science courses, and then left to lead the band, orchestra, and choirs at Washington Missionary College, now Washington Adventist University, in Washington, D.C. He received a master's degree in history from the University of Michigan. Shadel began his career as a musician in silent movie theaters before taking his marimba to live radio.

Shadel began writing for The American Rifleman, a journal of the National Rifle Association of America (NRA). Shadel received press credentials from CBS and shipped overseas to cover the European Theater. His duties were taken over by his associate editors, and The American Rifleman carried articles and interviews by Shadel up until the end of the war. Edward R. Murrow recruited Shadel while he was working in Europe as a correspondent for the NRA. During World War II, Shadel covered the June 6, 1944, D-Day invasion for CBS Radio. During his years at CBS, Shadel worked alongside Murrow, Howard K. Smith, Walter Cronkite, and Eric Sevareid. He and Murrow were the first reporters in the German concentration camp at Buchenwald. They came by jeep and were swarmed by the starving and dying. Mr. Shadel said it was the memory of the living, not the multitudes of dead, that stayed with him most.

After the war, Shadel reported from Washington, D.C., trying his hand at television at WTOP-TV as a Capitol Hill reporter for the local CBS news program then anchored by Walter Cronkite. Each week on WTOP-TV, a local department store sponsored a fashion show; Shadel met and fell in love with one of the models. She became his wife of more than 56 years, Julie Strouse.

In 1954 Shadel became the first host of the Sunday-morning interview show Face the Nation. He later became one of several anchors for ABC's Evening News after John Charles Daly stepped down in 1960, and also that year moderated the third presidential debate between Richard M. Nixon and John F. Kennedy. In 1962, Shadel anchored ABC's 12 hour coverage of John Glenn's three-orbit flight around the Earth. He left the news business in 1963, then taught as Professor of communications at the University of Washington until retiring 12 years later.

He was given the "Witness to the Truth" award by the Simon Wiesenthal Center in 1990. Shadel was the 1951 president of the Radio-Television Correspondents Association.

First	Face the Nation Moderator; November 7, 1954 – August 14, 1955	Succeeded by Stuart Novins
