= Southern Center for International Studies =

International affairs research center in Atlanta, Georgia

- Formation: 1962
- Purpose: dedicated to international study
- Headquarters: Atlanta, GA
- President: Peter White
- Website: www.scis.org

The Southern Center for International Studies (SCIS), founded in 1962, is a non-profit, private organization dedicated to international study. Located in Atlanta, GA, it hosts several annual events, such as the Retired Secretaries of Defense Conference, and regularly hosts events for visiting dignitaries such as Tenzin Gyatso (the current Dalai Lama), Crown Prince Hassan of Jordan, President of Georgia Mikhail Saakashvili, former Secretaries of State Madeleine Albright and Colin Powell, former Secretary of the Treasury Robert Rubin, and former Secretary of Defense Donald Rumsfeld. The Southern Center for International Studies publishes educational materials including books, videos, and workbooks, updates a timeline on its website, and conducts corporate training events. The current president is Peter White.
