= Sander Vanocur =

American journalist (1928–2019)

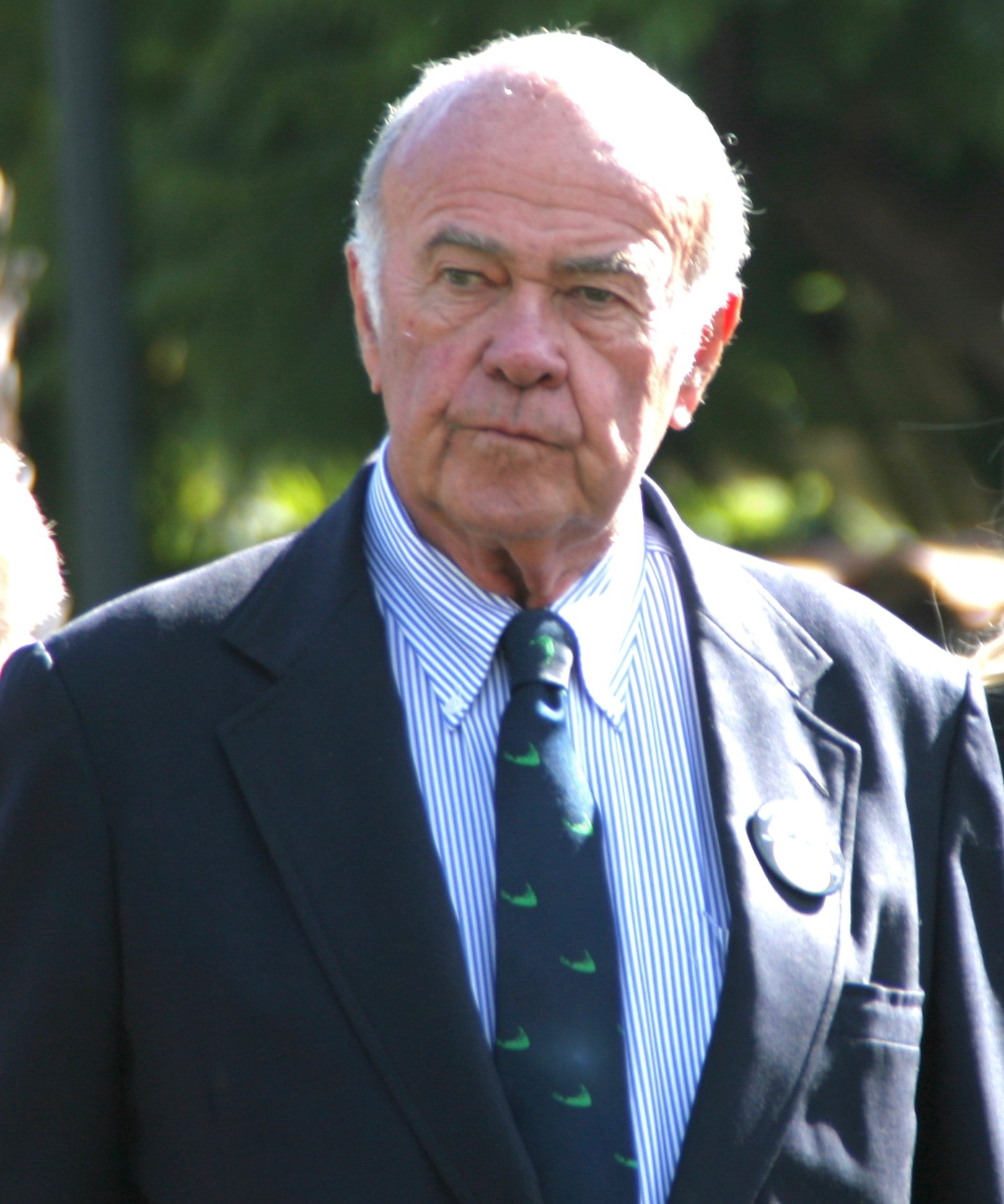
- Vanocur in 2006
- Born: Alexander Vinocur; January 8, 1928; Cleveland, Ohio, U.S.
- Died: September 16, 2019 (aged 91); Santa Barbara, California, U.S.
- Education: Northwestern University
- Occupation: Broadcast journalist
- Spouses: Edith Pick (m. 1956; died 1975) Virginia Backus Wood (m. 1975)
- Children: 2

Sander Vanocur (/ˌvænˈoʊkər/; born Alexander Vinocur, January 8, 1928 – September 16, 2019) was an American television journalist who focused on U.S. national electoral politics, primarily for NBC News and ABC News.

== Life and career ==
Vanocur was born in Cleveland, Ohio, the son of Rose (Millman) and Louis Vinocur, a lawyer. His family was of Russian Jewish descent. Vanocur moved to Peoria, Illinois when he was twelve years old. After attending Western Military Academy in Alton, Illinois, he earned a bachelor's degree in political science from the Northwestern University School of Speech (1950) and studied at the London School of Economics (1951–1952). He became an intelligence officer in the United States Army for two years with service in Austria and Berlin, and achieved the rank of first lieutenant. After service in the Army, he began his journalism career as a reporter on the London staff of The Manchester Guardian and also did general reporting for The New York Times.

=== Broadcast journalism career ===
Described as "one of the country's most prominent political reporters during the 1960s," Vanocur served as White House correspondent and national political correspondent for NBC News in the 1960s and early 1970s. He was one of the questioners at the first of the Kennedy-Nixon debates in 1960, as well as one of NBC's "four horsemen," its floor reporters at the political conventions in the 1960s—the other three were John Chancellor, Frank McGee, and Edwin Newman. While White House correspondent during the Kennedy administration, Vanocur was one of the first reporters to publicly ask Kennedy to justify the failure of the Bay of Pigs Invasion. Vanocur also dubbed Kennedy's coterie the "Irish mafia."

Later, Vanocur covered the 1968 United States presidential election in which United States Senator Robert F. Kennedy was assassinated. Vanocur, who had interviewed Kennedy on June 4, 1968, shortly before the Democratic candidate was shot, reported on the incident from The Ambassador Hotel in Los Angeles, California, for the entire night. Kennedy died the following day at Good Samaritan Hospital. On the final night of the 1968 Republican National Convention in Miami Beach, during a convention-wrapping Thursday night round-table discussion with his fellow NBC floor reporters in the vacated folding chairs on the convention hall floor, Vanocur suggested that the Republicans had "kissed off the black vote" in 1968, a comment which caused a media uproar in the ensuing week.

Vanocur also served as host of First Tuesday, a monthly newsmagazine that premiered in 1969 and continued after Vanocur left the network. His work at NBC earned him a place on the Nixon administration's "enemies list".

After leaving NBC in 1971, Vanocur worked for PBS and as a television writer for The Washington Post. He joined ABC News in 1977 and worked there until 1991, holding various positions, including chief diplomatic correspondent, senior correspondent in Buenos Aires, and anchor for Business World, the first regularly scheduled weekly business program. He covered the 1997, 1998, and 1999 World Economic Summits and was chief overview correspondent during the 1980 and 1984 presidential elections. In 1984, Vanocur moderated the vice presidential debate between incumbent George H. W. Bush and Congresswoman Geraldine Ferraro. He was also one of the questioners in the 1992 presidential debate.

=== Other work ===
Vanocur played fictional versions of himself as a broadcast journalist in theatrical films The Gang That Couldn't Shoot Straight (1971), Raise the Titanic (1980), Dave (1993), and Street Fighter (1994). He also appeared as himself in the TV movies Without Warning (1994) and Weapons of Mass Distraction (1997).

Vanocur served as television presenter in two of the History Channel's primetime series: Movies in Time and History's Business.

Vanocur provided narration and further historical material for an expanded audiobook release of the Nixon-Kennedy presidential debates.

== Personal life ==
Vanocur married his first wife, fashion designer Edith Pick, on March 3, 1956, and they had two sons, Nicholas and Christopher Vanocur. Christopher is a television news reporter and a former news anchor in the Salt Lake City television market. After Edith's death in April 1975, Vanocur married Virginia Backus Wood on December 19, 1975.

Vanocur died from complications of dementia at a hospice facility in Santa Barbara, California, on September 16, 2019, at the age of 91.

== In popular culture ==
Vanocur was parodied by Bob Elliott as national newscaster Sandy Van Andy in another 1971 comedy film Cold Turkey.
