= Camel News Caravan =

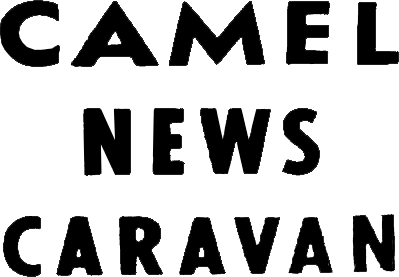
- Presented by: John Cameron Swayze
- Country of origin: United States

Production
- Running time: 15 minutes

Original release
- Network: NBC
- Release: February 16, 1949 – October 26, 1956

Related
- Huntley-Brinkley Report

The Camel News Caravan or Camel Caravan of News is an American television program broadcast by NBC. Anchored by John Cameron Swayze, it aired from February 16, 1949, to October 26, 1956, and was replaced by The Huntley–Brinkley Report. Sponsored by the Camel cigarette brand, it was the first NBC news program to use NBC filmed news stories rather than movie newsreels. On February 16, 1954, the Camel News Caravan became the first news program broadcast in color, making use of 16mm color film. In early 1955, the R.J. Reynolds Tobacco Company, maker of Camel cigarettes, cut back its sponsorship to three days a week. Chrysler's Plymouth division sponsored the other days, and on those days, the program was labelled the Plymouth News Caravan. The program featured a young Washington correspondent named David Brinkley, and competed against Douglas Edwards with the News on rival CBS. With greater resources, the News Caravan attracted a larger audience than its CBS competition until 1955.

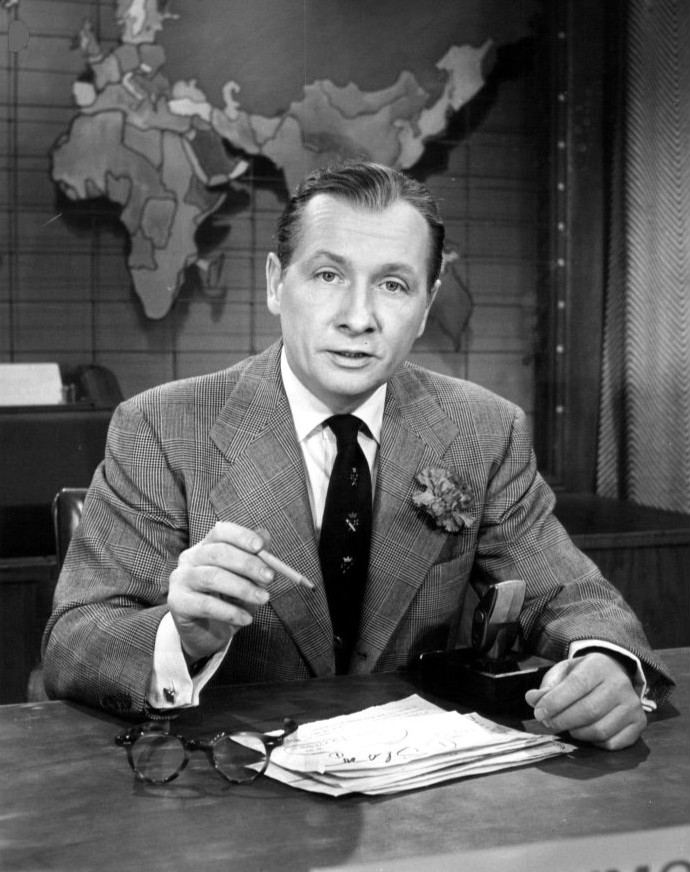
John Cameron Swayze reporting in 1955

Launched on February 16, 1948, by NBC as NBC Television Newsreel, and later Camel Newsreel Theatre, it began as a 10-minute program that featured Fox Movietone News newsreels. John Cameron Swayze provided voice-over for the series. The Camel News Caravan was an expanded version of the Camel Newsreel Theatre and featured Swayze on-camera. It was also known as the Camel Caravan of News.

Beginning in September 1956, R. J. Reynolds withdrew from sponsoring the Caravan after more than eight years, having already reduced its sponsorship to two days owing to high costs and competition from children's programming on ABC and CBS. At that time, the program was being promoted as the NBC News Caravan, and sponsors included Reynolds (Monday and Thursday), Sperry-Rand (Tuesday), Miles Labs (Friday and alternating Wednesdays), and Time Inc. (alternating Wednesdays).

The Camel News Caravan was replaced by The Huntley–Brinkley Report on October 29, 1956. President Dwight D. Eisenhower had word passed to NBC's White House correspondent that the president was displeased by the switch. In late 1961 and early 1962, Swayze served as one of three anchors of ABC News's evening news program but became best-known for his appearances in commercials for Timex watches.
