= Media coverage of the assassination of John F. Kennedy =

This article outlines the media coverage after the assassination of John F. Kennedy, the 35th president of the United States, on November 22, 1963 at 12:30pm CST.

The television coverage of the assassination and subsequent state funeral was the first in the television age and was covered live from start to finish, nonstop for 70 hours. Over the four days of the assassination and state funeral, the three television networks, ABC, CBS, and NBC, were on the air 55 to 71 hours non-stop, the longest uninterrupted news event until September 11, 2001 and had a total of over 1,500 staff report on the events.

== Breaking the news ==
=== Locally in Dallas ===
In Dallas, The Rex Jones Show on music station KLIF was interrupted by the first news bulletin at approximately 12:38 p.m. CST. A "bulletin alert" sounder faded in during the song "I Have a Boyfriend" by the Chiffons. The song was stopped and newscaster Gary DeLaune made the first announcement over the bulletin signal:

This KLIF bulletin from Dallas: Three shots reportedly were fired at the motorcade of President Kennedy today near the downtown section. KLIF News is checking out the report. We will have further reports. Stay tuned.

KBOX reporter Sam Pate, who was on the Stemmons Freeway in a mobile news cruiser at the time of the shooting, covered the scene at Dealey Plaza and at Dallas City Hall with live radio updates. The widely repeated audio clip of Pate breathlessly reporting "It appears as though something has happened in the motorcade route!" is taken from a reenactment recorded several days later.

Dallas CBS Radio affiliate KRLD concluded the coverage of the presidential party's arrival at Love Field and switched to reporter Bob Huffaker, who was standing at the corner of Main and Akard Streets in the downtown area, just 1/2 mile east of Dealey Plaza. After the president's car passed him, Huffaker continued reporting for several more minutes and was believed to have been on the air as the shooting took place, although shots cannot be heard in the audio coverage. Shortly after KRLD returned to regular programming with the nationally syndicated religious program Back to the Bible, the first reports of the shooting came through CBS Radio. Huffaker was not aware of the developments until he arrived back at the KRLD studio after wrapping up his coverage, and he quickly drove to Parkland Hospital to report the scene outside the emergency entrance.

NBC Radio affiliate WBAP played instrumental music, with interruptions for local bulletins, until NBC Radio's continuous coverage began.

Dallas' ABC television affiliate WFAA was airing a local lifestyle program, The Julie Benell Show. At 12:45 p.m. CST, the station abruptly switched from the prerecorded program to news director Jay Watson, who had been at Dealey Plaza and had heard three shots before running back to the station:

Good afternoon, ladies and gentlemen. You'll excuse the fact that I am out of breath, but about 10 or 15 minutes ago, a tragic thing, from all indications at this point, has happened in the city of Dallas. Let me quote to you this... [briefly looks down at the bulletin sheet in his left hand] And I'll -- you'll excuse me if I am out of breath. A bulletin, this is from the United Press from Dallas: (Reading UPI bulletin) 'President Kennedy and Governor John Connally have been cut down by assassins' bullets in downtown Dallas. They were riding in an open automobile when the shots were fired. The president, his limp body carried in the arms of his wife Jacqueline, has rushed to Parkland Hospital.'

Watson then anchored WFAA's continuous coverage of the tragedy with Jerry Haynes, host of the children's show Mr. Peppermint, including an interview with witnesses Abraham Zapruder and Bill and Gayle Newman.

NBC affiliate WBAP was showing a program called Dateline at the time when the news first broke.

=== Nationally ===
The first national news bulletin of the shooting was transmitted over the ABC Radio Network at 12:36 p.m. CST/1:36 p.m. EST. The network was airing the Music in the Afternoon program hosted by Dirk Fredericks and Joel Crager, and Doris Day's recording of "Hooray for Hollywood" was playing when newscaster Don Gardiner interrupted with:

We interrupt this program to bring you a special bulletin from ABC Radio. Here is a special bulletin from Dallas, Texas. Three shots were fired at President Kennedy's motorcade today in downtown Dallas, Texas. This is ABC Radio. To repeat, in Dallas, Texas, three shots were fired at President Kennedy's motorcade today, the president now making a two-day speaking tour of Texas. We're going to stand by for more details on the incident in Dallas. Stay tuned to your ABC station for further details. Now we return you to your regular program.

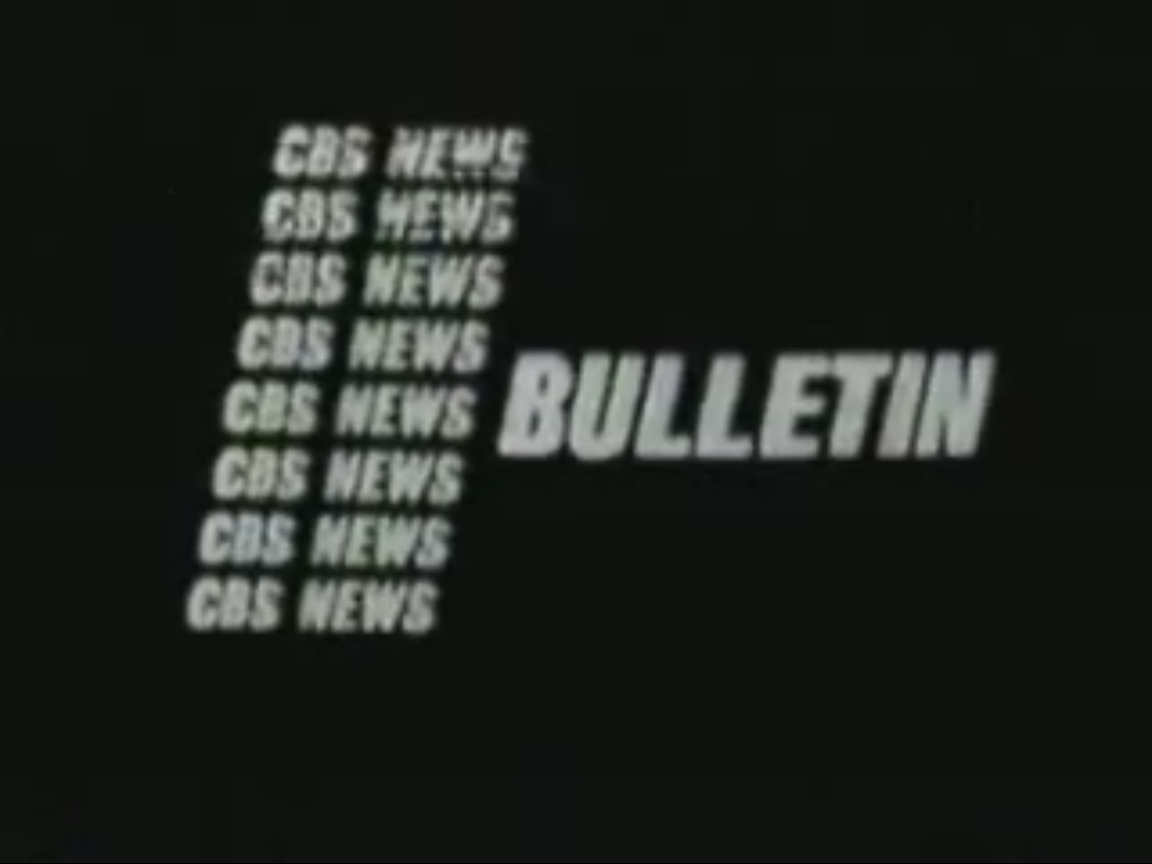
Screenshot of the interruption

At 12:40 p.m. CST/1:40 p.m., CBS became the first television network to report the news, interrupting its live broadcast of the soap opera As the World Turns. A large, black "CBS News Bulletin" slide appeared on-screen while Walter Cronkite, reporting from the CBS Radio flash booth, filed an audio-only report. Cronkite could not immediately appear on the air because there were no active and ready cameras in the CBS newsroom. Television cameras of the era used image orthicon tubes that required approximately 20 minutes of warmup time. Shortly after this, CBS enacted a policy that ensured a camera would be operational at all times for breaking news bulletins. Cronkite announced:

Here is a bulletin from CBS News. In Dallas, Texas, three shots were fired at President Kennedy's motorcade in downtown Dallas. The first reports say that President Kennedy has been seriously wounded by this shooting. More details just arrived. These details about the same as previously: President Kennedy shot today just as his motorcade left downtown Dallas. Mrs. Kennedy jumped up and grabbed Mr. Kennedy. She called "Oh, no!" The motorcade sped on. United Press says that the wounds for President Kennedy perhaps could be fatal. Repeating, a bulletin from CBS News: President Kennedy has been shot by a would-be assassin in Dallas, Texas. Stay tuned to CBS News for further details.

Cronkite broke in with a second bulletin just as As the World Turns, which was still being performed live as nobody had been made aware of the interruptions, was about to return from its mid-show station identification break. The serial was then joined in progress, and during the advertising break that followed CBS broke in one more time with Cronkite updating the audience on what was transpiring. This time, he remained on the air filing reports over the bumper slide until the camera was ready, which happened to coincide with CBS’ station identification break at the top of the 2:00 PM hour; Cronkite then told viewers that the network would briefly pause so all of its affiliates could join the broadcast.

ABC and NBC were not broadcasting nationally at the time of the CBS bulletins, and their affiliate stations were airing their own content. In New York, WABC-TV's first bulletin came from Ed Silverman at 1:42 p.m. EST, interrupting a rerun of The Ann Sothern Show. At the same time of ABC-TV's first bulletin, NBC Radio reported the first of three "Hotline Bulletins", each preceded by a "talk-up alert" that provided all NBC-affiliated stations 30 seconds to join their parent network.

Three minutes later, Don Pardo interrupted WNBC-TV's local rerun of Bachelor Father with the news, announcing: "President Kennedy was shot today just as his motorcade left downtown Dallas. Mrs. Kennedy jumped up and grabbed Mr. Kennedy. She cried 'Oh no!' The motorcade sped on." At 1:53 p.m. EST, NBC broke into local programming with an NBC Network bumper slide followed by coverage anchored by Chet Huntley and Bill Ryan. NBC's camera was not ready and its coverage was limited to audio-only reports. At 1:57 p.m. EST, just as Frank McGee joined the broadcast, NBC began broadcasting the report when its camera became operational. The first few minutes are considered lost, as the network did not begin recording at the start of its coverage, though an audio recording of Pardo's bulletins exists.

Other than for two audio-only bulletins, one following the initial report, ABC did not disrupt its affiliate stations' programming, instead waiting until the network was to return to broadcasting at 2:00 p.m. EST to begin its coverage.

Radio coverage was reported by Don Gardiner (ABC), Allan Jackson (CBS) and (after a top-of-the-hour newscast) Peter Hackes and Edwin Newman (NBC).

== Television and radio coverage (from approx. 2:00 to 2:40 p.m. EST) ==
=== ABC ===
Providing the reports for ABC Television were Don Goddard, Ron Cochran, and Ed Silverman in New York, Edward P. Morgan in Washington, Bob Clark, who had been riding in the motorcade when Kennedy was shot from Parkland Hospital, and Bill Lord from the Dallas County sheriff's office. As with the other networks, ABC interspersed with their Dallas affiliate WFAA-TV 8 for up-to-date information. Reporting from WFAA were Bob Walker, who had been at Love Field for live coverage of the President's arrival, and Jay Watson, who had remained on the air locally from the time he broke into a local talk show upon his return from Dealey Plaza. They were later joined by Bob Clark upon his arrival from the hospital.

ABC's initial coverage of the incident was very disorganized. Cochran, ABC's primary news anchor, was on his lunch break when word of the assassination attempt first broke and the network had to call him back to the studio. Silverman was the voice accompanying ABC's first bulletin, which lasted for a minute and 55 seconds at approximately 11:53 a.m. CST, and was broadcast during a rerun episode of Father Knows Best that was airing on a majority of the network's affiliates in the Mountain Time Zone at the time. The surviving videotape of ABC's initial bulletins appears to have been recorded by then-affiliate KTVK in Phoenix, Arizona, as it contains the interruption of Father Knows Best. Right after the end of the first bulletin, the episode continued until the conclusion with the Screen Gems logo. During the end credits, William Windom voiced a promo for the upcoming episode of The Farmer's Daughter, titled The Editorial Wheel, which aired the following week as announced later on because of the assassination. After the Screen Gems logo comes a short promo for The Travels of Jaimie McPheeters, voiced by Dan O'Herlihy. After the conclusion of the promo, ABC went to black for several seconds before cutting straight to its large, white "ABC News Bulletin" slide for an estimate 30 seconds before cutting to Goddard.

The first on-camera report was given by Goddard in the network's news studio, which was too far away from the teletype machines. Goddard then moved to the newsroom and was joined by the returning Cochran, and the technical crew began constructing an impromptu news set around them. ABC did not have studio space ready for such an occasion. NBC had a flash studio in its newsroom and CBS' reports came directly from their own newsroom as they had since they launched an evening newscast earlier in 1963. Cochran and Goddard were forced to stand and awkwardly hold microphones and headsets so they could report the information.

In addition to the disorganization in New York, ABC was not able to switch to Dallas to speak to its correspondents. Only one feed was available to them at first, which came from the Dallas Trade Mart and CBS affiliate KRLD reporter Eddie Barker. CBS had earlier aired snippets of Barker's report, but had cut it off to return to its own reporting of the incident before Barker finished. ABC aired the remainder of the report until the end. The reason that ABC was able to air the CBS affiliate's coverage was due to a pool arrangement the three major Dallas stations agreed to for the President's visit. WBAP was responsible for covering the President's visit to Fort Worth and his departure and landing at Love Field, WFAA was assigned to cover the parade through downtown Dallas, and KRLD was set up at the Dallas Trade Mart for the address the President was to give.

At 2:25 p.m. EST, while attempting to switch to Bob Clark in Dallas, ABC Radio reported that Parkland Hospital said President Kennedy was dead, and then stressed that it was unconfirmed. Upon reporting the news, anchor Don Gardiner said this to his audience:

Ladies and gentlemen, this is a moment trying for all of us. Let us pause, and let us all pray.

ABC Radio then played an extract from "Candlelight" by Mantovani.

At 2:33 p.m. EST, Cochran reported on ABC Television that the two priests who were called into the hospital to administer the last rites to the President said that he had died from his wounds. Although this was an unconfirmed report, ABC prematurely placed a photo of the President with the words "JOHN F. KENNEDY – 1917–1963" on the screen.

Five minutes later, this photo was again prematurely placed when Cochran received an erroneous report that the President had died at 1:35 p.m. CST when, in fact, he had died at 1:00 p.m. CST. A few minutes following that, Cochran received further information regarding the President's condition and relayed the following to the ABC viewing audience:

Government sources now confirm...we have this from Washington. Government sources now confirm that President Kennedy is dead. So that, apparently, is the final word and an incredible event that I am sure no one except the assassin himself could have possibly imagined would occur on this day.

On ABC Radio, Gardiner reported the news, but did not say whether or not it was official. ABC then switched to Pete Clapper on Capitol Hill for an interview with the Senate's press liaison Richard Reidel. Moments later, the interview was interrupted by Gardiner's report of the President's death:

Ladies and gentlemen, the President of the United States, John Fitzgerald Kennedy, is dead. The President is dead. Let us pray.

ABC Radio then played an extract from Mantovani's "Stradivarus" before continuing coverage.

=== CBS ===
At 2:00 p.m. EST, CBS took an extended station identification break so the affiliates in the Mountain and Pacific time zones could join the rest of the network in covering the story. Cronkite, now at his desk in the newsroom, appeared on camera for the first time and, for the sake of any new viewers who might not have been aware of what was happening, told the audience of the attempt made on the President's life.

From the time the CBS affiliates joined Cronkite in the news room at the top of the hour to approximately 2:38 p.m. EST, the coverage alternated from the CBS Newsroom and Cronkite, to KRLD-TV's Eddie Barker at the Dallas Trade Mart where President Kennedy was to give his luncheon address.

At approximately 2:11 p.m. EST, CBS News correspondent Dan Rather telephoned one of the two priests who performed last rites on Kennedy to confirm that he had indeed been shot. "Yes, he's been shot and he is dead," the priest told Rather. Almost simultaneously at the Trade Mart, a doctor went up to Barker and whispered, "Eddie, he is dead... I called the emergency room and he is DOA." Moments later, as the news cameras panned throughout the Trade Mart crowds, Barker gave this report:

As you can imagine, there are many stories that are coming in now as to the actual condition of the President. One is that he is dead; this cannot be confirmed. Another is that Governor Connally is in the operating room; this we have not confirmed.

Several minutes later, when CBS switched back to KRLD and the Trade Mart for another report, Barker repeated the claim of the President's death, adding "the source would normally be a good one." During this report, as Barker was speaking of security precautions for the President's visit, a Trade Mart employee was shown removing the Presidential seal from the podium where President Kennedy was to have spoken.

==== CBS Radio's death announcement ====
At 2:19 p.m. EST, CBS Dallas correspondents Dan Rather and Eddie Barker spoke by telephone to "compare notes, to take stock". Rather was aware that there was an open line to New York as the two of them spoke, but "didn't realize how many people were on that phone line", which included at least three individuals from CBS Radio. Rather, who had "no doubt in his mind" that Kennedy was dead, nevertheless was not delivering official word to CBS Radio, nor was he aware that his discussion with Barker would be construed as such.

As Rather spoke to Barker, an individual from CBS Radio asked, "Did you say the president is dead?" Rather replied, "Yes." Based on the call, CBS Radio newsroom supervisor Robert Skedgell wrote "JFK DEAD" on a slip of paper and handed it to CBS Radio news anchor Allan Jackson. At 2:22 p.m. EST, eleven minutes before Kilduff's official announcement, Jackson made the following announcement:

Ladies and gentlemen, the president of the United States is dead. John F. Kennedy has died of the wounds he received in an assassination in Dallas less than an hour ago. We repeat: it has just been announced that President Kennedy is dead.

After the announcement, CBS Radio, apparently trying to play "The Star-Spangled Banner", accidentally aired a brief excerpt of an LP Samuel Barber's Adagio for Strings played at the wrong speed of 78 RPM. After a few seconds of silence, Jackson repeated the news:

John Fitzgerald Kennedy, the 35th President Of The United States, is dead at the age of 46. Shot by an assassin as he drove through the streets of Dallas, Texas less than an hour ago. Repeating this: the President is dead, killed in Dallas, Texas by a gunshot wound.

This was followed by an excerpt from the first movement to Beethoven's Pastoral Symphony. After the music, Jackson again repeated the news:

We repeat our announcement that the President of the United States, John Fitzgerald Kennedy, is dead in Dallas, Texas, of an assassin's bullets. He was shot, and governor Tom Connelly of the state of Texas was shot, as they rode in a motorcade through the streets of Dallas less than an hour ago. Governor Connelly is in serious condition, President John Kennedy is dead. The 35th president of the United States, he was 46 years old. According to the constitution, Vice President Lyndon Johnson will now succeed Mr. Kennedy in office. Mr. Johnson will become the 36th president of the United States, very probably within a few hours upon taking the oath of office.

After Jackson's announcement, his co-anchor Dallas Townsend added:

Well, as a matter of fact, Allan, Lyndon Johnson is now the president whether he takes the Oath or not. He is the president.

Townsend's comment was followed by "The Star-Spangled Banner".

==== CBS TV ====
While CBS Radio had taken Dan Rather's earlier discussion with Barker as confirmation of the president's death, there was a debate going on between CBS television network officials as to whether or not to report this development, as Rather's report was not a truly official confirmation. At 2:27 p.m. EST, they decided to give Rather's report to Cronkite, who relayed this to the nation:

We just have a report from our correspondent Dan Rather in Dallas that he has confirmed that President Kennedy is dead. There is still no official confirmation of this. However, it's a report from our correspondent, Dan Rather, in Dallas, Texas.

Approximately five minutes after this, one of the newsroom staff members rushed to Cronkite's desk with another bulletin. As Cronkite read the bulletin, he had to re-read it as he stumbled over his words.

The priest... who were with Kennedy... the two priests who were with Kennedy say that he is dead of his bullet wounds. That seems to be about as close to official as we can get at this time.

Although Cronkite continued to stress that there was no official confirmation, the tone of Cronkite's words seemed to indicate that it would only be a matter of time before the official word came. Three minutes later, he received the same report that ABC's Ron Cochran chose to relay as official word. Cronkite did not do the same, reporting it instead in this context:

And now, from Washington, government sources say that President Kennedy is dead. Those are government sources, still not an official announcement.

Cronkite continued as before while still awaiting word of the official confirmation of the President's death, which at this time had been relayed by Kilduff at the hospital two minutes prior but had not made the press wires yet. After speaking about what Kennedy had done earlier that day in Fort Worth, Cronkite noted that the plane from Fort Worth flew the President to his "rendezvous with death, apparently, in Dallas", although the official bulletin still had not arrived yet.

Immediately after that, at 2:38 p.m. EST, Cronkite remarked on fearful concerns of demonstrations in Dallas similar to the attack of U.N. Ambassador Adlai Stevenson in Dallas the previous month. At that moment, a CBS News employee seen in the background pulled off a sheet from the AP News ticker. He quickly relayed it (off-camera) to Cronkite, who put on his glasses, took a few seconds to read the sheet, and made the announcement:

From Dallas, Texas, the flash, apparently official: [reading AP flash] 'PRESIDENT KENNEDY DIED AT 1 P.M. (CST),' 2:00 Eastern Standard Time, some thirty-eight minutes ago.

After reading the flash, Cronkite took off his glasses so he could consult the studio clock, which established the lapse in time since Kennedy had died. He paused briefly and replaced his eyeglasses, visibly moved for a moment. Cronkite continued:

Vice President Johnson... (clears throat) ...has left the hospital in Dallas, but we do not know to where he has proceeded. Presumably, he will be taking the oath of office shortly and become the thirty-sixth president of the United States.

There was a sense of irony to CBS' coverage of the assassination. On September 2, 1963, Kennedy gave an interview with Cronkite, helping CBS inaugurate network television's first half hour evening newscast.

It should perhaps be noted that CBS did not include any further coverage from Dallas or Washington as the other networks had until after the announcement of Kennedy's death. As coverage continued following the announcement, Charles Collingwood relieved Cronkite in New York while Neil Strawser reported from CBS' Washington bureau and Dan Rather and Eddie Barker provided reports from KRLD in Dallas.

=== NBC ===
At NBC-TV, Chet Huntley, Bill Ryan, and Frank McGee anchored from the network's emergency "flash" studio (code name 5HN) in New York, with reports from David Brinkley in Washington, Charles Murphy and Tom Whelan from NBC affiliate WBAP-TV (now KXAS-TV) in Fort Worth, Texas, and Robert MacNeil, who had been in the motorcade, at Parkland Hospital. Edwin Newman reported from NBC Radio with periodic simulcast with NBC-TV. NBC Radio's coverage was simulcast in Canada by CBC Radio.

The United States' international shortwave broadcaster, Voice of America, relayed portions of NBC's coverage, including the simulcast with the television coverage, as part of its English-language coverage of the tragic news. A short aircheck of VOA exists in which the announcers on duty attempt to make sense of the conflicting reports about Kennedy's condition, and then the station briefly simulcasts NBC before heading into Polish-language programming at 1:00 p.m. Central Time.

Throughout the first 35 minutes, there were technical difficulties with the Fort Worth TV relay as well as with the phone link MacNeil was using to report from the hospital. When the coverage began, McGee was waiting for MacNeil to call in with information. While Ryan and Huntley were recounting the information, McGee got MacNeil on the line and told him to recount chronologically what happened. The NBC flash studio had no way of patching calls through the studio speakers, so nobody else could hear what MacNeil was saying.

While the studio crew worked on a solution, McGee improvised and told MacNeil to relay the information in fragments, which he would then repeat for the audience. While they were talking, Huntley was handed a speaker from off camera and took the receiver from McGee so he could attach it to the earpiece, this enabling MacNeil to be heard. By that time there was no further information to report. MacNeil had a medical student from Parkland hold the phone line for him so that he could return to the emergency ward for the latest developments. He returned briefly several minutes later to offer more word on the condition of the President, during which the phone link temporarily worked, but as MacNeil left again the relay cut out. Before he left, he informed McGee that a press conference regarding Kennedy's condition was forthcoming.

At approximately 2:35 p.m. EST, shortly after Ryan reported that a neurosurgeon had just arrived at Parkland to assist in treating Kennedy. Huntley alluded to the last time a president had died in office:

In just this momentary lull, I would assume that the memory of every person listening at this moment has flashed back to that day in April 1945 when Franklin Delano Roosevelt ...

However, he was unable to complete his thought. The flash regarding the priests who administered the Last Rites to the President had reached the desk while Huntley was speaking, and Ryan interrupted him to relay this:

Excuse me, Chet. Here is a flash from the Associated Press, dateline Dallas: 'Two priests who were with President Kennedy say he is dead of bullet wounds.' There is no further confirmation, but this is what we have on a flash basis from the Associated Press: 'Two priests in Dallas who were with President Kennedy say he is dead of bullet wounds.' There is no further confirmation. This is the only word we have indicating that the president may, in fact, have lost his life. It has just moved on the Associated Press wires from Dallas. The two priests were called to the hospital to administer the last rites of the Roman Catholic Church. And it is from them, we get the word, that the president has died, that the bullet wounds inflicted on him as he rode in a motorcade through downtown Dallas have been fatal. We will remind you that there is no official confirmation of this from any source as yet.

As this was going on, McGee received a report from Parkland Hospital. Shortly after arriving at the hospital, Vice President Johnson had been advised to begin heading back to Washington to assume executive duties in case he needed to be sworn in. Johnson decided to wait until he received word of Kennedy's condition, which he did at approximately 1:20 PM CST. McGee reported to Ryan that a motorcade carrying the Johnsons had just left Parkland Hospital, which Ryan took to be confirmation of the President's death as the priests had reported.

On NBC Radio and CBC Radio, Newman reported the same flash, having received it about half a minute after Ryan did:

Here is a flash from Dallas: 'Two priests who were with President Kennedy say he is dead of bullet wounds suffered in the assassination attempt today.' I repeat, a flash from Dallas: 'Two priests who were with President Kennedy say he is dead of bullet wounds.' This is the latest information we have from Dallas. We are, of course, standing by to give you all available information as it comes to us. I will repeat, with the greatest regret, this flash: 'Two priests who were with President Kennedy say he has died of bullet wounds.'

At that point, both radio networks rejoined NBC-TV where Ryan reported that there may in fact be confirmation of the priests' account of Kennedy's death. The feed then switched back to Charles Murphy at WBAP-TV, who reported that although no official statement had been released by the President's staff, the Dallas Police Department had been notified of Kennedy's death and radioed the word to every one of its officers on duty shortly before the flash from Dallas made the wires.

As Murphy was filing his report, McGee got back in touch with Robert MacNeil, who had just returned from the aforementioned press conference. Partway through the report, the audio link was fixed and MacNeil could be clearly heard in the studio and on the air. McGee was unaware of this, as he simply carried on as he had been:

White House (Acting) Press Secretary... Malcolm Kilduff... has just announced that President Kennedy... died at approximately 1:00 Central Standard Time, which is about 35 minutes ago... (audio enabled) ...after being shot at (after being shot)... by an unknown assailant (by an unknown assailant) ...during a motorcade drive through downtown Dallas (during a motorcade drive through downtown Dallas).

After MacNeil had finished giving all the relevant information available, he left the phone to obtain further information. McGee, wiping a tear from his eye, stood by and kept the phone line open for MacNeil's next update.

=== KLIF Radio, Dallas ===
From local radio station KLIF, Gary Delaune relayed the bulletins as received with reports from Joe Long from KLIF News Mobile Unit #4. Long, who had reported the President's arrival at Love Field earlier and filed reports from his news cruiser after he had gotten stuck in traffic in the midst of the chaos, later joined Delaune in the studio; Roy Nichols took over the #4 mobile unit and headed for Parkland Hospital. After a report from the Trade Mart, radio broadcaster and KLIF founder Gordon McLendon returned to the radio station to relieve Delaune. The reporters continuously stressed, as a strict radio station rule of McLendon's, whether the information received is from official or unofficial sources, especially concerning reports of the President's death. At approximately 1:38 p.m. CST, KLIF's Teletype sounded ten bells (indicating an incoming bulletin of utmost importance) and Long was given the official flash:

Gordon McLendon: The President is clearly, gravely, critically, and perhaps fatally wounded. There are strong indications that he may already have expired, although that is not official, we repeat, not official. But, the extent of the injuries to Governor Connally is, uh, a closely shrouded secret at the moment...

Joe Long: President Kennedy is dead, Gordon. This is official word.

Gordon McLendon: Ladies and gentlemen, the President is dead. The President, ladies and gentlemen, is dead at Parkland Hospital in Dallas.

KLIF's continuous coverage would eventually be aired over an ad-hoc radio network of its own, as the station's coverage was fed to KLIF's sister stations in Houston, Louisville, and other cities and reportedly aired (with or without permission) on dozens, possibly hundreds, of others.

=== United Kingdom ===
A Reuters tickertape machine reported news of the assassination at GMT 6:42 PM, 12 minutes after the event.

President Kennedy was shot at today while riding in a motor convoy. A photographer reported seeing blood on the President's head.

Granada Television, broadcasting the news program Scene at 6:30 to the north of England from Manchester, reported the news just before GMT 7:00. The BBC shortly followed up with announcements on its three national radio networks, including the program Radio Newsreel which ran from GMT 7:00 to GMT 7:30 PM with a Washington-based BBC journalist providing live updates by phone to an estimated 2.7 million listeners.

On BBC television, the first announcement to air was made at GMT 7:05 PM by stand-in newsreader John Roberts, just prior to the program Tonight. Tonight continued with its planned edition until around GMT 7:26 PM when Roberts returned to provide updates of Kennedy's critical condition. Shortly after on air he answered a phone call from BBC Monitoring which relayed news of the death of Kennedy as reported by the Voice of America.

Roberts' countenance visibly changed and he announced to the audience, "We regret to announce that President Kennedy is dead," before bowing his head and not looking up. For the next nineteen minutes the BBC screened its logo and a revolving globe, punctuated by three bulletins read by Roberts. BBC management then decided to revert back to regular programming, screening Here's Harry from GMT 7:45 PM, followed by Dr. Finlay's Casebook, a decision which attracted over 2,000 phone calls and 500 letters and telegrams in complaint.

At GMT 11:00 pm, four hours after the news broke, the BBC broadcast Tribute to President Kennedy, featuring Prime Minister Alec Douglas-Home, Liberal leader Jo Grimond and Leader of the Opposition Harold Wilson who had sped from North Wales to the BBC's Manchester studio.

On ITV television, a newsflash interrupted the game show Take Your Pick around GMT 7:10 PM, but the program continued, as did the medical soap opera Emergency - Ward 10 which followed it at GMT 7:30 PM. Ten minutes later, it was cut off and an announcement of Kennedy's death was made, and updates continued over the station's interlude card. A recorded programme of solemn music performed by the Hallé Orchestra followed.

== Coverage over the weekend ==
From the moments the shots were fired, all three television networks suspended all regular programs and commercials and ran coverage on non-stop basis for four days after the funeral.

Over the four days, the three television networks were on the air for anywhere between 55 and 71 hours and had a total of more than 1,500 news reporters, technicians, and others in the news department on duty.

Network	Hours on the Air	Number of Staff on Duty
ABC	60	500
CBS	55	660
NBC	71	400

The assassination of President Kennedy was the longest uninterrupted news event in the history of American television until just before 9:00 a.m. EDT, September 14, 2001, when the networks were on the air for 72 hours straight covering the 9/11 terrorist attacks.

== Coverage of state funeral ==
NBC broadcast uninterrupted coverage of the people passing through the Capitol rotunda during the overnight hours. Reuven Frank recounted that NBC News vice-president Bill McAndrew ordered pictures of the crowds passing through the rotunda all night, which provided a calming effect.

Millions followed the funeral on television. Those who watched the funeral on television were the only ones who saw the ceremony in its entirety. The three networks, ABC, CBS, and NBC used at least 50 cameras for the joint coverage in order to allow viewers to follow the proceedings in their entirety from the Capitol to Arlington. The pool coverage was handled by CBS. The networks' Washington bureau chiefs, Bob Fleming at ABC, Bill Monroe at NBC, and Bill Small at CBS, moved correspondents and cameras to keep them ahead of the cortège. Small had correspondents along the cortège, while Fleming had Howard K. Smith and Edward P. Morgan anchor from the ABC Washington studio and Monroe had The Huntley–Brinkley Report team of Chet Huntley and David Brinkley anchor from Washington.

NBC transmitted coverage of the procession from the White House to the cathedral by satellite to twenty-three countries, including Japan and the Soviet Union, allowing hundreds of millions on both sides of the Iron Curtain in Europe to watch the funeral. Satellite coverage ended when the coffin went into the cathedral. In the Soviet Union, Yuri Fokin said that "the grief of the Soviet people mingles with the grief of the American people." There was no coverage in East Germany, where television audiences had only a soccer match to watch.

In Ireland, coverage of the funeral was broadcast live by the television service, Teilifís Éireann to the Irish audience via Telstar satellite. The Irish audience were only able to see the 25 minutes that showed President Kennedy's coffin being brought to St. Matthew's Cathedral. The Irish television audiences did not see all of the footage live but Michael O'Hehir's audio commentary remained available to them throughout. In Britain, coverage of the funeral was broadcast by both the BBC and ITV who also screened the funeral live via Telstar. The BBC's leading news commentator, Richard Dimbleby, gave live commentary of the funeral on BBC-TV. Brian Connell gave live commentary of the funeral on ITV.

Father Leonard Hurley, a Catholic priest, provided the commentary for the funeral Mass for the networks.
