= NBC News =

News division of NBCUniversal

- News division of: NBC
- Key people: Rebecca Blumenstein (president)
- Founded: February 21, 1940; 86 years ago
- Headquarters: 30 Rockefeller Plaza; New York, New York U.S.
- Major Bureaus: West Coast Headquarters, Universal City, California; Governmental Affairs Headquarters, Washington, D.C.; European Headquarters, London, England; Asia Pacific Headquarters, Singapore and Hong Kong
- Area served: Worldwide
- Broadcast programs: Today; NBC Nightly News; Meet the Press; Weekend Today; Dateline NBC; Early Today; Today with Jenna & Sheinelle
- Divisions: NBC News International
- Website: nbcnews.com

1959–1972 logo

NBC News is the news division of the American broadcast television network NBC. It operates under the NBCUniversal News Group, a unit of NBCUniversal, which itself is a subsidiary of Comcast. The news division's various operations report to the president of NBC News, Rebecca Blumenstein. The NBCUniversal News Group also comprises the Spanish language Noticias Telemundo. It formerly included MSNBC, the network's 24-hour cable news channel, as well as business and consumer news channels CNBC and CNBC World before they split in 2025 as part of a larger split from NBCUniversal into Versant.

NBC News aired the first regularly scheduled news program in American broadcast television history on February 21, 1940. The group's broadcasts are produced and aired from 30 Rockefeller Plaza, NBCU's headquarters in New York City. The division presides over the flagship evening newscast, NBC Nightly News; the world's first of its genre morning television program, Today; and the longest-running American television series, Meet the Press, a Sunday morning newsmaker interview program. NBC News also offers 70 years of rare historic footage from the NBCUniversal Archives online. NBC News operates NBCNews.com, the division's official website.

== History ==
=== Caravan era ===
The first regularly scheduled American television newscast in history was made by NBC News on February 21, 1940, anchored by Lowell Thomas (1892–1981), and airing weeknights at 6:45 pm. In June 1940, NBC, through its flagship station in New York City, W2XBS (renamed commercial WNBT in 1941, now WNBC) operating on channel one, televised 30.25 hours of coverage of the Republican National Convention live and direct from Philadelphia. The station used a series of relays from Philadelphia to New York for rebroadcast on W2XB in Schenectady (now WRGB), making this among the first "network" programs of NBC Television. Due to wartime and technical restrictions, there were no live telecasts of the 1944 conventions, although films of the events were reportedly shown over WNBT the next day.

About this time, there were irregularly scheduled, quasi-network newscasts originating from NBC's WNBT in New York City (WNBC) and reportedly fed to WPTZ (now KYW-TV) in Philadelphia and WRGB in Schenectady, NY. For example, Esso sponsored news features as well as The War As It Happens in the final days of World War II, another irregularly scheduled NBC television newsreel program that was also seen in New York, Philadelphia, and Schenectady on the relatively few (roughly 5000) television sets that existed at the time. After the war, NBC Television Newsreel aired filmed news highlights with narration. Later in 1948, when sponsored by Camel Cigarettes, NBC Television Newsreel was renamed Camel Newsreel Theatre and then, when John Cameron Swayze was added as an on-camera anchor in 1949, the program was renamed Camel News Caravan.

In 1948, NBC teamed up with Life magazine to provide election night coverage of President Harry S. Truman's surprising victory over New York governor Thomas E. Dewey. The television audience was small, but NBC's share in New York was double that of any other outlet. The following year, the Camel News Caravan, anchored by Swayze, debuted on NBC. Lacking the graphics and technology of later years, it contained many elements of modern newscasts. NBC hired its own film crews and in the program's early years, it dominated one of its competitors, CBS, which did not hire its own film crews until 1953. In 1950, David Brinkley began serving as the program's Washington correspondent, but attracted little attention until paired with Chet Huntley in 1956. In 1955, the Camel News Caravan fell behind CBS' Douglas Edwards with the News, and Swayze lost the already tepid support of NBC executives. The following year, NBC replaced the program with the Huntley-Brinkley Report.

Beginning in 1951, NBC News was managed by Director of News Bill McAndrew, who reported to Vice President of News and Public Affairs J. Davidson Taylor.

=== Huntley-Brinkley era ===
The NBC logo in 1954

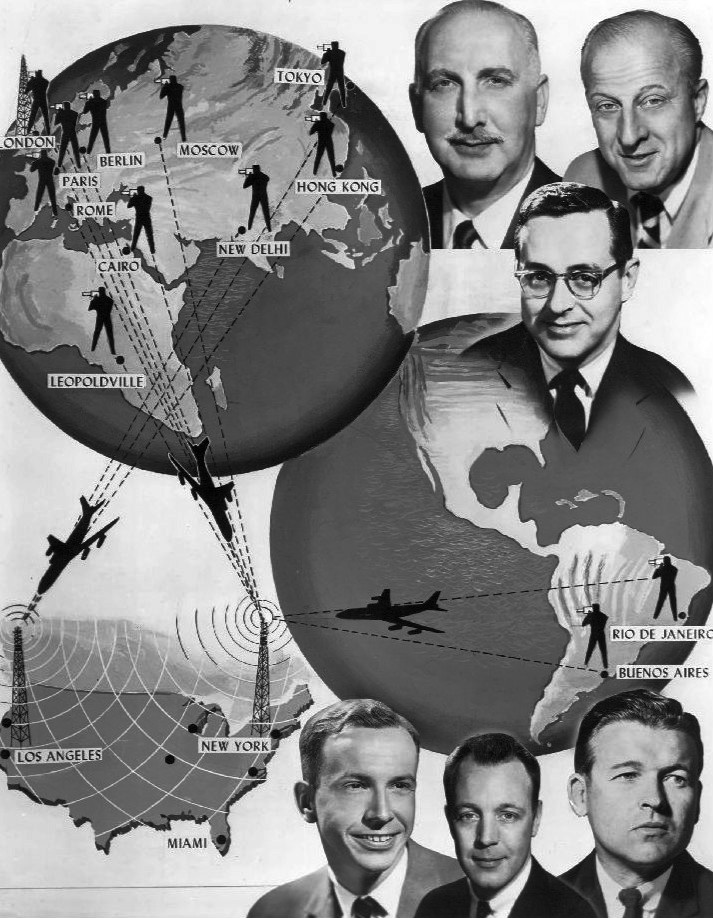
NBC News had close to 700 correspondents and cameramen in 1961 who were stationed throughout the world. The film was received in the United States by plane or by the jointly operated NBC-BBC transatlantic film cable.

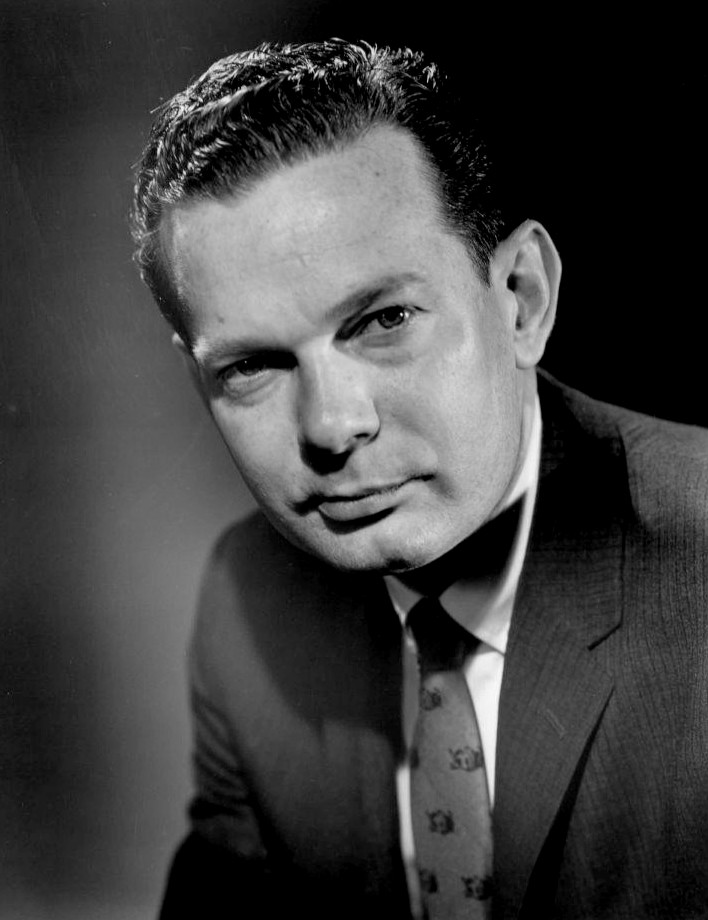
David Brinkley, one of the network's first anchors

Television assumed an increasingly prominent role in American family life in the late 1950s, and NBC News was called television's "champion of news coverage." NBC president Robert Kintner provided the news division with ample amounts of both financial resources and air time. In 1956, the network paired anchors Chet Huntley and David Brinkley and the two became celebrities, supported by reporters including John Chancellor, Frank McGee, Edwin Newman, Sander Vanocur, Nancy Dickerson, Tom Pettit, and Ray Scherer.

Created by Producer Reuven Frank, NBC's The Huntley–Brinkley Report had its debut on October 29, 1956. During much of its 14-year run, it exceeded the viewership levels of its CBS News competition, anchored initially by Douglas Edwards and, beginning in April 1962, Walter Cronkite.

NBC's Vice President of News and Public Affairs, J. Davidson Taylor, was a Southerner who, with Producer Reuven Frank, was determined that NBC would lead television's coverage of the civil rights movement. In 1955, NBC provided national coverage of Martin Luther King Jr.'s leadership of the Montgomery bus boycott in Montgomery, Alabama, airing reports from Frank McGee, then News Director of NBC's Montgomery affiliate WSFA-TV, who would later join the network. A year later, John Chancellor's coverage of the admission of black students to Central High School in Little Rock, Arkansas, was the first occasion when the key news story came from television rather than print and prompted a prominent U.S. senator to observe later, "When I think of Little Rock, I think of John Chancellor." Other reporters who covered the movement for the network included Sander Vanocur, Herbert Kaplow, Charles Quinn, and Richard Valeriani, who was hit with an ax handle at a demonstration in Marion, Alabama in 1965.

While Walter Cronkite's enthusiasm for the space race eventually won the anchorman viewers for CBS and NBC News, with the work of correspondents such as Frank McGee, Roy Neal, Jay Barbree, and Peter Hackes providing ample coverage of American-crewed space missions in the Project Mercury, Project Gemini, and Project Apollo programs. In an era when space missions received continuous coverage, NBC configured its largest studio, Studio 8H, for space coverage. It used models and mockups of rockets and spacecraft, maps of the Earth and Moon to show orbital trackage, and stages on which animated figures created by puppeteer Bill Baird were used to depict movements of astronauts before on-board spacecraft television cameras were feasible. (Studio 8H had been home to the NBC Symphony Orchestra and is now the home of Saturday Night Live.) NBC's coverage of the first Moon landing in 1969 earned the network an Emmy Award.

In the late 1950s, Kintner reorganized the chain of command at the network, making Bill McAndrew president of NBC News, reporting directly to Kintner. McAndrew served in that position until he died in 1968. McAndrew was succeeded by his Executive Vice President, Producer Reuven Frank, who held the position until 1973.

On November 22, 1963, NBC interrupted various programs on its affiliate stations at 1:45 p.m. to announce that President John F. Kennedy had been shot in Dallas, Texas. Eight minutes later, at 1:53:12 p.m., NBC broke into programming with a network bumper slide and Chet Huntley, Bill Ryan and Frank McGee informing the viewers what was going on as it happened. Still, the reports were audio-only since a camera was not in service. However, NBC did not begin broadcasting over the air until 1:57 p.m. ET. About 40 minutes later, after word came that JFK was pronounced dead, NBC suspended regular programming and carried 71 hours of uninterrupted news coverage of the assassination and the funeral of the president—including the only live broadcast of the fatal shooting of Kennedy's assassin, Lee Harvey Oswald, by Jack Ruby as Oswald was being led in handcuffs by law-enforcement officials through the basement of Dallas Police Headquarters.

=== NBC Nightly News era ===
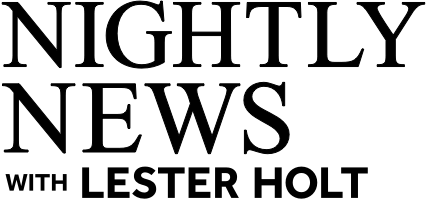
NBC Nightly News logo in 2019

NBC's ratings lead began to slip toward the end of the 1960s and fell sharply when Huntley retired in 1970; he died of cancer four years later, in 1974. The loss of Huntley and RCA's reluctance to fund NBC News at a similar level as CBS's funding of its news division left NBC News in the doldrums. NBC's primary news show gained its present title, NBC Nightly News, on August 3, 1970.

This is a previous 2D version of the 1986 NBC News logo, which was used from 1986 to 2023, using the NBC Futura Medium typeface.

The network tried a platoon of anchors (Brinkley, McGee, and Chancellor) during the early months of Nightly News. Despite the efforts of the network's eventual lead anchor, the articulate, even-toned Chancellor, and an occasional first-place finish in the Nielsens, Nightly News in the 1970s was primarily a strong second. By the end of the decade, NBC had to contend not only with a powerful CBS but also a surging ABC, led by Roone Arledge. Tom Brokaw became sole anchor in 1983, after co-anchoring with Roger Mudd for a year, and began leading NBC's efforts. In 1986 and 1987, NBC won the top spot in the Nielsens for the first time in years, only to fall back when Nielsen's rating methodology changed. In late 1996, Nightly News again moved into first place, a spot it has held onto in most of the succeeding years. Brian Williams assumed primary anchor duties when Brokaw retired in December 2004.

In 1993, Dateline NBC broadcast an investigative report about the safety of General Motors' (GM) trucks. GM discovered the "actual footage" used in the broadcast had been rigged by including explosive incendiaries attached to the gas tanks and improper sealants for those tanks. GM subsequently filed an anti-defamation lawsuit against NBC, which publicly admitted the results of the tests were rigged and settled the lawsuit with GM on the very same day.

In November 1995, NBC News signed an agreement with German public broadcaster ZDF to share newsgathering resources. The agreement enabled NBC News to move its Frankfurt bureau to ZDF's headquarters in Mainz.

On October 22, 2007, Nightly News moved into its new high-definition studio, Studio 3C, at NBC Studios in 30 Rockefeller Plaza in New York City. The network's 24-hour cable network, MSNBC, also joined the network in New York on that day. The new studios–headquarters for NBC News and MSNBC were now located in one area.

=== 2007–2014 ===
The previous 3D version of the 1986 NBC News logo, using the NBC Futura Medium typeface, was used from 2013 to 2023.

During the Great Recession, NBC Universal urged NBC News to save $500 million. On that occasion, NBC News laid off several of its in-house reporters, such as Kevin Corke, Jeannie Ohm, and Don Teague. This was the largest layoff in NBC News history.

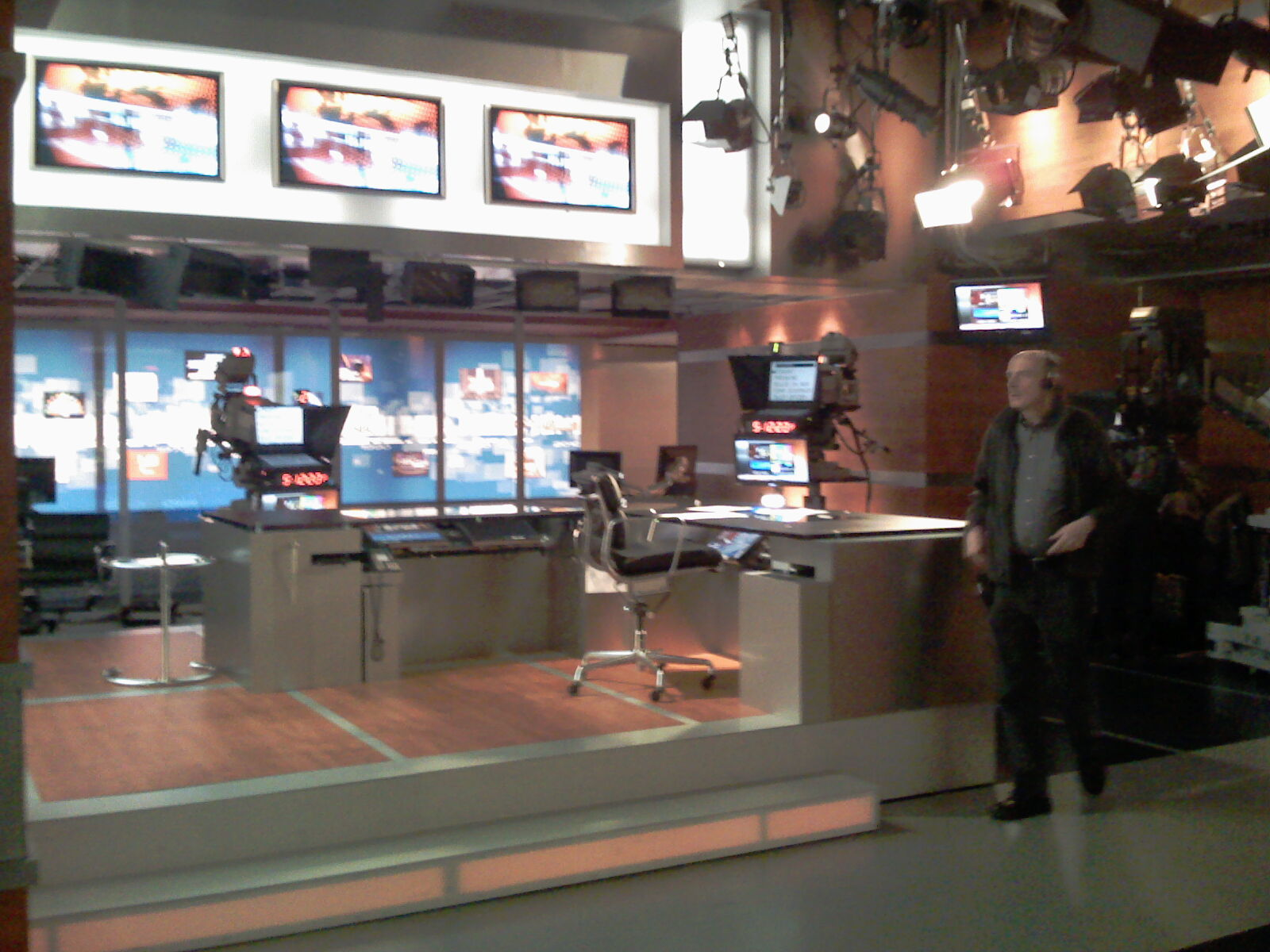
NBC Nightly News Set in 2008

After the sudden death of the influential moderator Tim Russert of Meet the Press in June 2008, Tom Brokaw took over as an interim host; and on December 14, 2008, David Gregory became the new moderator of the show until August 14, 2014, when NBC announced that NBC News Political Director Chuck Todd would take over as the 12th moderator of Meet the Press starting September 7, 2014. Gregory's last broadcast was on August 10, 2014.

By 2009, NBC had established leadership in network news, airing the highest-rated morning, evening, and Sunday interview news programs. Its ability to share costs with MSNBC and share in the cable network's advertising and subscriber revenue made it far more profitable than its network rivals.

On March 27, 2012, NBC News broadcast an edited segment from a 911 call placed by George Zimmerman before he shot Trayvon Martin. The editing made it appear that Zimmerman volunteered that Martin was black, rather than merely responding to the dispatcher's inquiry, which would support a view that the shooting was racially motivated. A media watchdog organization accused NBC News of engaging in "an all-out falsehood." While NBC News initially declined to comment, the news agency did issue an apology to viewers. The Washington Post called the statement "skimpy on the details on just how the mistake unfolded."

On December 13, 2012, NBC News reporter Richard Engel and his five crew members, Aziz Akyavaş, Ghazi Balkiz, John Kooistra, Ian Rivers, and Ammar Cheikh Omar, were kidnapped in Syria. Having escaped after five days in captivity, Engel said he believed that a Shabiha group loyal to al-Assad was behind the abduction and that the crew was freed by the Ahrar al-Sham group five days later. Engel's account was however challenged from early on. In April 2015, NBC had to revise the kidnapping account, following further investigations by The New York Times, which suggested that the NBC team "was almost certainly taken by a Sunni criminal element affiliated with the Free Syrian Army," rather than by a loyalist Shia group.

In 2013, John Lapinski was Director of Elections, replacing Sheldon Gawiser. In 2015, the election team's decision desk group was given its first permanent space at 30 Rockefeller, replacing the News Sales Archives that had occupied the space previously.

=== 2015–2018 ===
In February 2015, NBC suspended Brian Williams for six months for telling an inaccurate story about his experience in the 2003 invasion of Iraq. He was replaced by Lester Holt on an interim basis. In March 2015, amid the firing and declining ratings, Andrew Lack rejoined NBC News as a chairman for the division and MSNBC. On June 18, 2015, it was announced that Holt would become the permanent anchor of the Nightly News, and Williams would be moved to MSNBC as an anchor of breaking news and special reports beginning in August. At MSNBC, Lack would move to reduce its emphasis on opinion programming, and place a larger focus on hard news programs, as well as increased use of NBC News personalities such as Williams, Kate Snow, Thomas Roberts, and Chuck Todd (who premiered a daily spin-off of Meet the Press).

MSNBC's ratings subsequently improved in the first quarter of 2016, with daytime viewership up by more than 100%. Today became the first-place morning news show, surpassing Good Morning America in total viewers as of March 31, 2016, following a six-month lead among 25–54-year-olds.

NBC News was the first news team to possess the tape of Donald Trump recorded by the NBCUniversal-produced entertainment news show Access Hollywood, after a producer had made NBC News aware of it. The division internally debated publishing it for three days, and then an unidentified source gave a copy of the tape to The Washington Post Reporter David Fahrenthold, who contacted NBC for comment, notified the Trump campaign that he had the video, obtained confirmation of its authenticity, and released a story and the tape itself, scooping NBC. Alerted that the Post might release the story immediately, NBC News released its own story shortly after the Post story was published.

In January 2017, NBC News hired former Fox News personality Megyn Kelly to a "triple role", which would include becoming a correspondent for major news events and election coverage, hosting a Sunday-night newsmagazine, as well as hosting a daytime talk show. The newsmagazine Sunday Night with Megyn Kelly premiered in June 2017, while the daytime talk show Megyn Kelly Today premiered in September 2017. In late-October 2018, Kelly attracted criticism for a segment on Megyn Kelly Today in which she defended the use of blackface in Halloween costumes; amid the controversy and poor ratings, NBC cancelled Megyn Kelly Today shortly afterward, and Kelly left NBC News in January 2019.

==== Sexual misconduct and NBC News ====
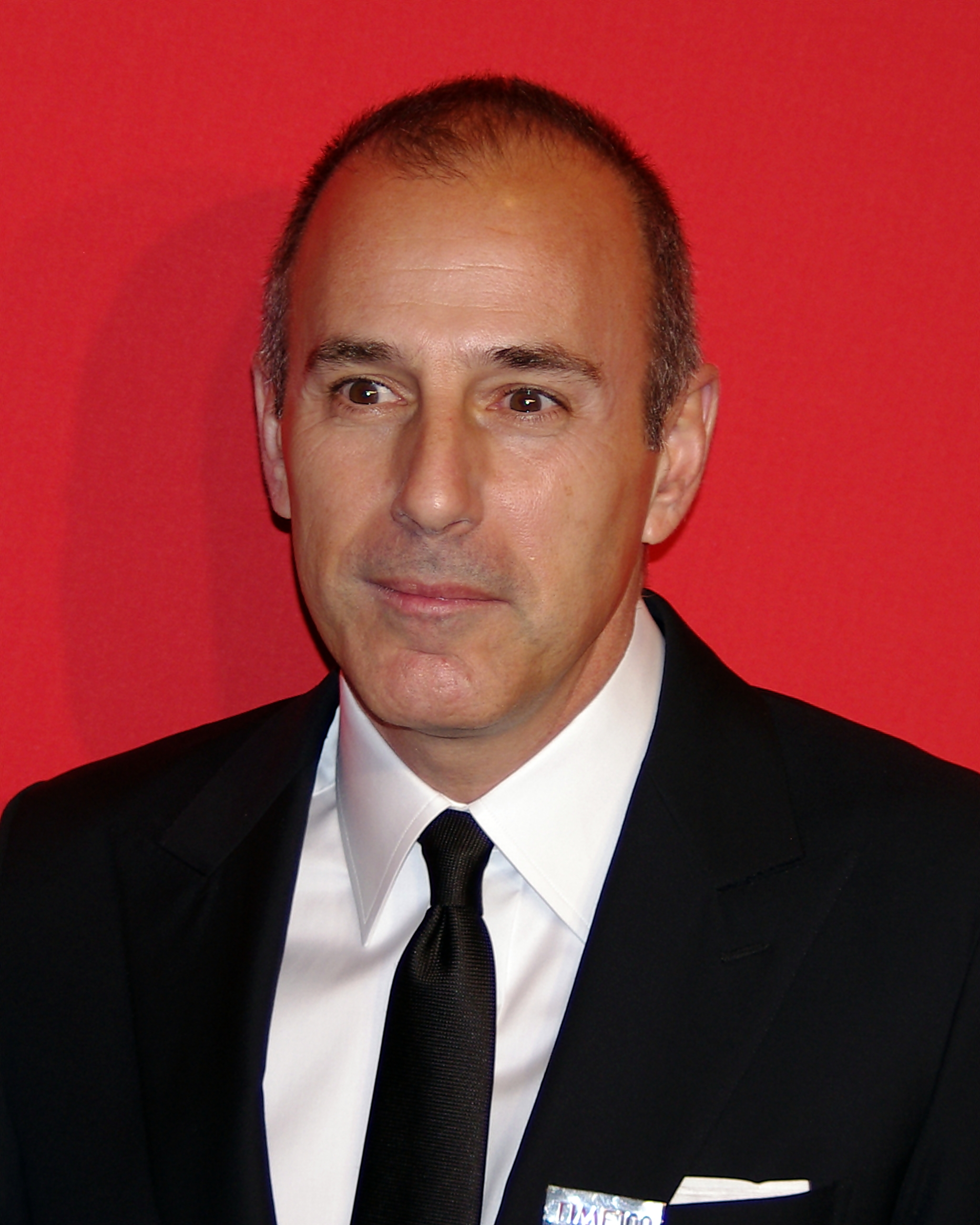
Matt Lauer in 2012

On November 29, 2017, NBC News announced that Matt Lauer's employment had been terminated after an unidentified female NBC employee reported that Lauer had sexually harassed her during the 2014 Winter Olympics in Sochi, Russia, and that the harassment continued after they returned to New York. NBC News management said it had been aware that The New York Times and Variety had been conducting independent investigations of Lauer's behavior, but that management had been unaware of previous allegations against Lauer. Linda Vester, a former NBC News correspondent, disputed the claims that management knew nothing, saying that "everybody knew" that Lauer was dangerous. According to Ronan Farrow, multiple sources have stated that NBC News was not only aware of Lauer's misconduct beforehand, but that Harvey Weinstein used this knowledge to pressure them into killing a story that would have outed his own sexual misconduct. Variety reported allegations by at least ten of Lauer's current and former colleagues. Additional accusations went public in the ensuing days.

NBC News President Noah Oppenheim suggested an investigation into alleged sexual misconduct by Harvey Weinstein after NBC contributor Ronan Farrow pitched a general idea to report on sexual harassment in Hollywood. After a 10-month investigation by Farrow and NBC Producer Rich McHugh, NBC chose not to publish it. The story, with very few changes, was published a few weeks later in the New Yorker Magazine instead. A story on the subject of Weinstein's alleged behavior also appeared several days earlier in The New York Times. Following criticism for missing a major story it had initiated, NBC News defended the decision, saying that at the time Farrow was at NBC, the early reporting still had important missing necessary elements. Farrow later disputed this characterization, saying that he had multiple named accusers willing to come forward and that the version ultimately published in the New Yorker had very few changes from the version that NBC News rejected. This version went on to win the Pulitzer Prize for Public Service in April 2018. A former NBC News executive has said that the story on Weinstein was killed because NBC News was aware of the sexual misconduct by Lauer; in Catch and Kill: Lies, Spies, and a Conspiracy to Protect Predators, Ronan Farrow cites two sources within American Media, Inc. stating that the story was killed in response to an overt threat from Weinstein to out Lauer.

=== 2018–present ===
In October 2018, NBC News announced that it would soft launch a new free ad-supported streaming television (FAST) channel, initially named "NBC News Signal". The service officially launched on May 29, 2019, as NBC News Now.

In May 2020, Lack departed from NBC News and left NBCUniversal, amid a reorganization being undertaken by new CEO Jeff Shell; NBC News, CNBC, and MSNBC were placed under the supervision of Cesar Conde as chairman of the NBCUniversal News Group.

Under Conde, NBC News began efforts to incorporate more diverse viewpoints—including from conservative perspectives—in its output outside of MSNBC (including Meet the Press), to alleviate concerns from its affiliate body that the left-leaning positioning of MSNBC reflected upon the division as a whole. These moves coincided with MSNBC's own changes in leadership, which resulted in a gradual increase in opinion programming, and as a result, a gradual decrease in talent sharing with the remainder of NBC News (with some personalities beginning to prioritize contributions to NBC News Now instead of MSNBC).

In March 2024, NBC News hired Ronna McDaniel, the former chairwoman of the Republican National Committee (RNC) from 2017 to 2024. The hire stirred controversy, as McDaniel had been a staunch Donald Trump loyalist during her tenure at the RNC. She made false claims of voter fraud after Joe Biden won the 2020 presidential election, which she sought to overturn. After NBC hired her during her interview on Meet the Press with Kristen Welker, McDaniel backtracked on her claims, saying that Biden won the 2020 election "fair and square" and condemned political violence. She said of her conduct as RNC chair, "When you're the RNC chair, you — you kind of take one for the whole team, right? Now I get to be a little bit more myself." After two days of on-air protests by former Meet the Press anchor Chuck Todd and various MSNBC commentators (including Rachel Maddow, Mika Brzezinski, Joe Scarborough and Nicolle Wallace), NBC News announced on March 26, 2024, that the network would not hire McDaniel.

In November 2024, parent company Comcast announced that NBCUniversal would divest most of its cable networks to a new company controlled by its shareholders, later named Versant. The spin-off will include CNBC and MSNBC.

On January 31, 2025, a Defense Department memo announced that NBC News must move out of its longtime workspace on the Correspondents' Corridor in the Pentagon, a move under a new Annual Media Rotation Program for the Pentagon Press Corps. In a statement, NBC News said, "We're disappointed by the decision to deny us access to a broadcasting booth at the Pentagon that we've used for many decades".

In October 2025, ahead of the Versant spin-off, CNBC and MSNBC began to separate their operations from NBC News, with the latter having expanded its in-house newsgathering resources throughout the year, and rebranded as MS NOW on November 15, 2025. Meanwhile, NBC News laid off approximately 150 employees to reduce redundancies. The layoffs dismantled the dedicated journalism teams producing the NBC News digital verticals NBC Asian America, NBC BLK (African Americans), NBC Latino, and NBC Out (LGBTQ+); it was reported that the four verticals would continue to operate, but using the resources of the overall NBC News staff. MS NOW would hire several NBC News reporters such as Ken Dilanian, Vaughn Hillyard, and Brandy Zadrozny, while Steve Kornacki left MS NOW to pursue an analytics role at NBC News and NBC Sports.

== Presidents ==
Thirteen people have served as president of NBC News during its history: William R. McAndrew (managed since 1951, named president, 1965–1968), Reuven Frank (1968–1973, 1981–1985), Richard Wald (1973–1977), Lester Crystal (1977–1979), William J. Small (1979–1981), Lawrence Grossman (1985–1988), Michael Gartner (1988–1993), Andrew Lack (1993–2001), Neal Shapiro (2001–2005), and Steve Capus (2005 – March 5, 2013). In August 2013, Deborah Turness assumed the role of President of NBC News, becoming the first woman to head the division. In February 2017, Today Show Producer and Executive Noah Oppenheim was named President of NBC News. Rebecca Blumenstein was named President of NBC News on January 10, 2023.

== Programming ==
=== NBC News programming ===
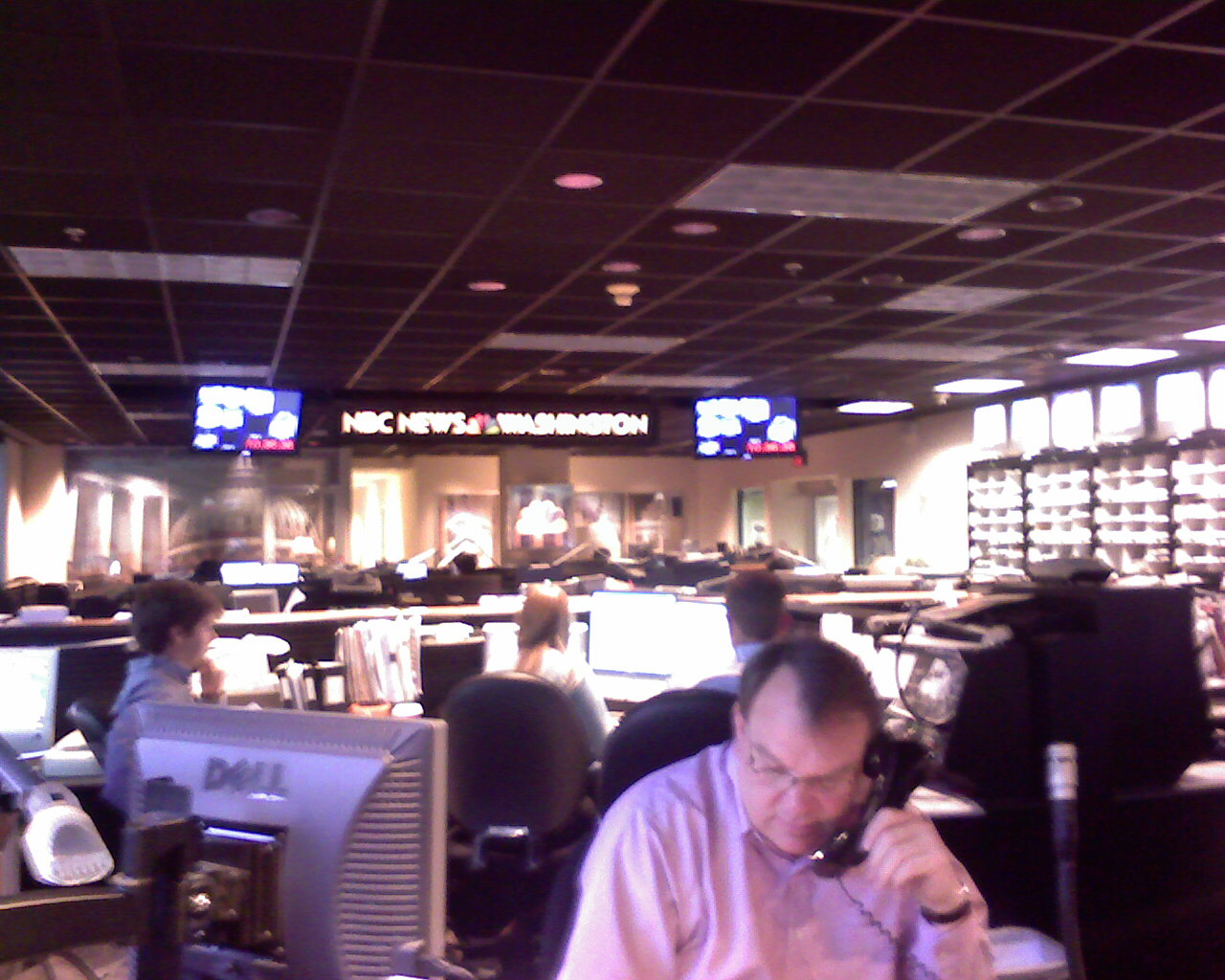
The NBC News Washington Bureau in 2007

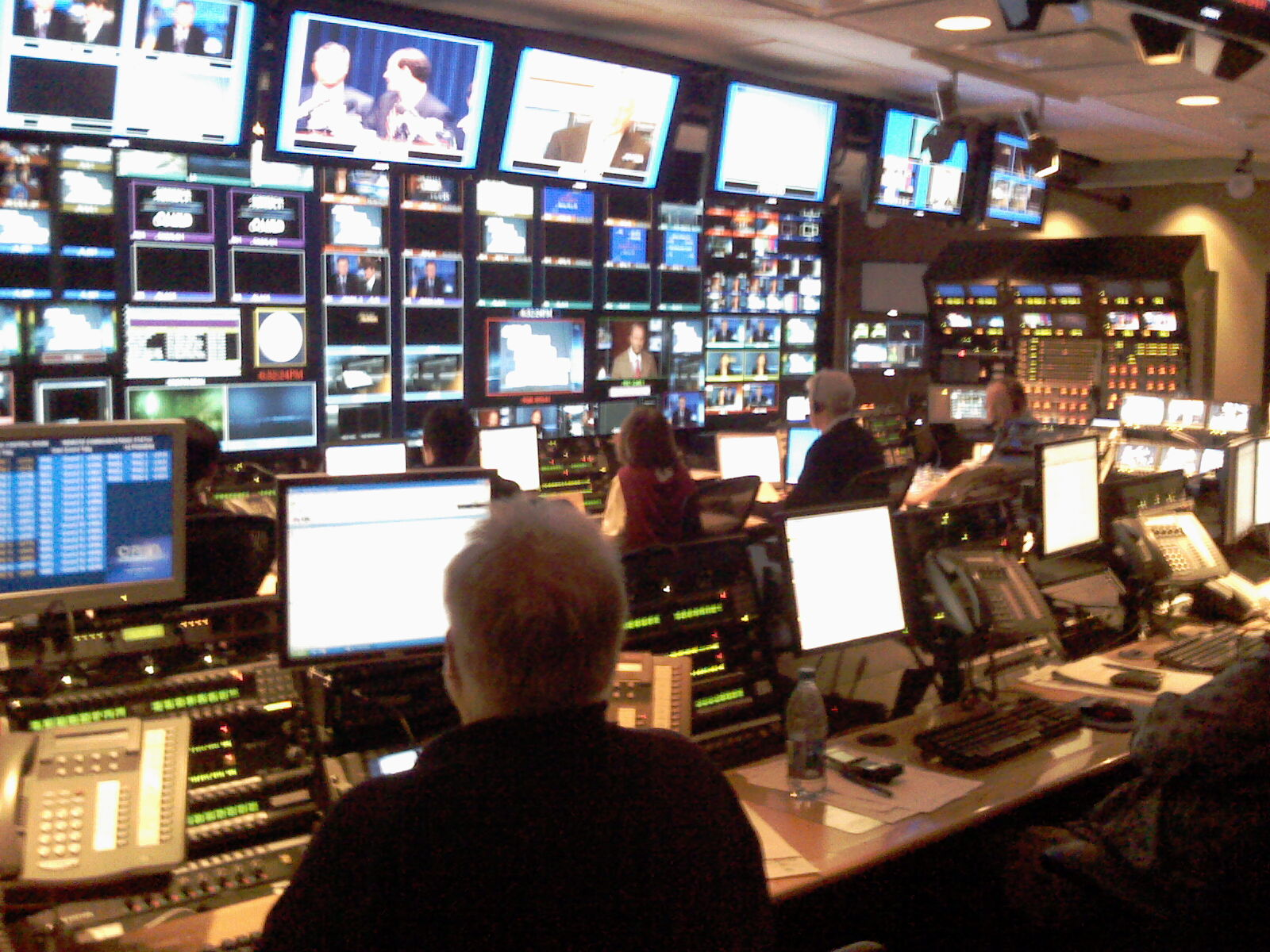
NBC Nightly News broadcast, March 2008

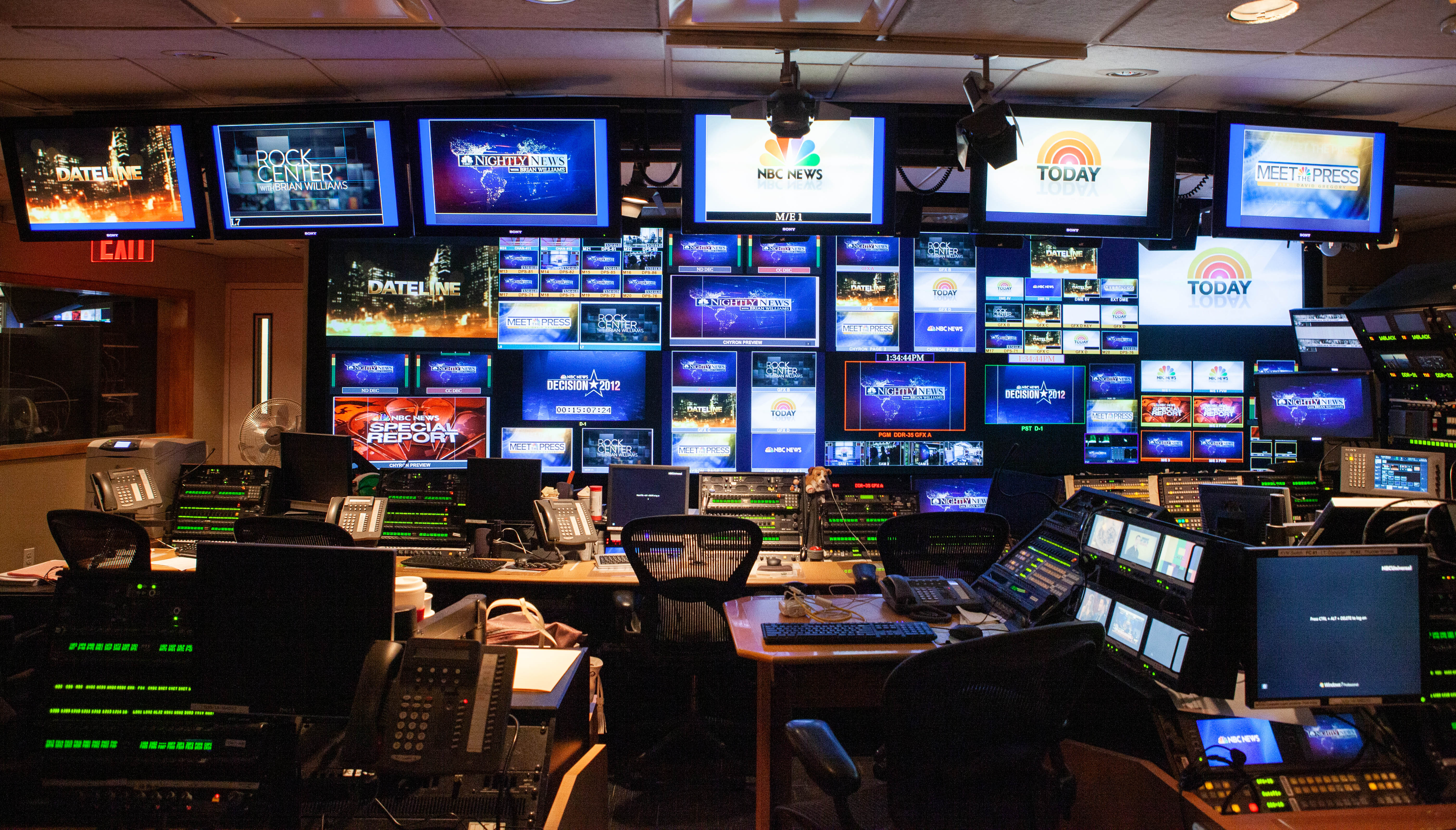
NBC News control room in 2012

- Meet the Press (since 1947)
- Today (since 1952)
- Today 3rd Hour (since 2018)
- NBC News Daily (since 2022, 1 p.m. hour shared with NBC News Now)
- NBC Nightly News (since 1970)
- Saturday Today (since 1992, shared with NBC News Now)
- Dateline NBC (since 1992)
- Early Today (1982–1983; since 1999, shared with NBC News Now)
- Sunday Today with Willie Geist (since 2016, shared with NBC News Now)
- Today with Jenna & Sheinelle (since 2026)

=== NBC News Now programming ===
- Meet the Press Now (since 2022; moved from MSNBC)
- Morning News Now (since 2022)
- Hallie Jackson Now (since 2021)
- NBC News Daily (since 2021, 1 p.m. hour shared with NBC broadcast network)
- Top Story with Tom Llamas (since 2021)
- Stay Tuned Now with Gadi Schwartz (since 2023)

=== Former programming ===
- Camel News Caravan (1948–1956)
- The Huntley-Brinkley Report (1956–1970)
- First Tuesday/Chronolog (1969–1973)
- NBC News Presents a Special Edition (1973–1974)
- Weekend (1974–1979)
- Ask NBC News (1979–1985)
- Prime Time Sunday/Saturday (1979–1980)
- NBC Magazine with David Brinkley (1980–1982)
- NBC News Overnight (1982–83)
- NBC News at Sunrise (1983–1999)
- Monitor/First Camera (1983–1984)
- Summer Sunday, USA (1984)
- American Almanac (1985–1986)
- Main Street (1985–1988)
- 1986 (1986)
- Yesterday, Today and Tomorrow (1989)
- Real Life with Jane Pauley (1990–91)
- Expose with Tom Brokaw (1991)
- NBC Nightside (1991–1998)
- Now with Tom Brokaw and Katie Couric (1993–94)
- NBC News at This Hour (August 1975–1990s; previously branded as NBC News Update, NBC News Capsule and NBC News Digest
- Later Today (1999–2000)
- Today with Kathie Lee and Hoda (2008–2019)
- Rock Center with Brian Williams (2011–2013)
- Today's Take (2000–2017)
- Sunday Night with Megyn Kelly (June 4 – July 30, 2017)
- Megyn Kelly Today (2017–2018)
- Today with Hoda & Jenna (2019–2025)
- Today with Jenna & Friends (2025–2026)

=== Syndicated productions ===
- The Chris Matthews Show (2002–2013)

=== Other productions ===
NBC News provides content for the internet and produced an occasional show (formerly a daily and formerly a twice-daily show) called Stay Tuned for Snapchat's Discover platform. It also produced programming for Quibi called The Report. The Stay Tuned team launched The Overview on Peacock in 2021.

=== NBC News International ===
In November 2016, NBC News Group chairman Andy Lack announced NBCUniversal intended to purchase a 25% stake in Euronews, a European news organization competing against the likes of BBC News and ITV News The transaction was completed at the end of May 2017; Deborah Turness, former President of NBC News, was appointed to run "NBC News International," to perform NBC's role in the partnership, in which each network would contribute reporting to the other.

In April 2020, NBCUniversal sold its stake in Euronews to focus all resources on the launch of NBC Sky World News, which was scheduled to launch later in 2020. However, the proposed new service was scrapped in August 2020, resulting in layoffs of 60 employees.

=== NBC News Radio and NBC News NOW ===
NBC News Radio
- Type: Radio network
- Broadcast area: United States

Programming
- Language: English
- Format: News
- Affiliations: 24/7 News (2016–present)

Ownership
- Owner: NBC News (NBCUniversal); Distributor: iHeartMedia

History
- Launch date: March 31, 2003

Coverage
- Availability: National (through broadcast affiliates)

The NBC Radio Network had been in place since 1926. On March 30, 2003, NBC News Radio debuted on approximately 240 radio stations as an all-news radio service, initially using the slogan "The news you want, when you want it." It featured NBC and MSNBC anchors and reporters, but was limited to one-minute newscasts on weekdays.

Westwood One partnered with NBC and made NBC News Radio available to all radio stations with which the syndicator was affiliated.

On October 21, 2011, Dial Global—a subsidiary of Oaktree Capital Management's Triton Media Group—acquired the majority of Westwood One's assets, including the distribution rights to NBC News Radio. Dial Global announced on March 2, 2012, that it would make NBC News Radio a full-time operation and a majority of CNN affiliates switched to NBC in this process. The new format consisted of twice-hourly newscasts.

Beginning July 11, 2016, NBCUniversal licensed the name "NBC News Radio" to iHeartMedia, using talent and reporters from iHeartMedia's existing 24/7 News Network, made available to the group's approximately 850 radio stations. The reintroduced service included an hourly newscast along with ancillary specials and longform breaking news coverage.

On February 16, 2023, NBC News announced that NBC News NOW was the name of its news streaming platform. It continued to be available on iHeartMedia, as well as via the TuneIn podcasting service.

=== NBC News Overnight and NBC Nightside ===
In 1982, NBC News began production of NBC News Overnight with anchors Linda Ellerbee, Lloyd Dobyns, and Bill Schechner. It usually aired at 1:35 a.m. E.T., following The Tonight Show and Late Night with David Letterman.

NBC News Overnight was canceled in December 1983, but in 1991, NBC News launched another overnight news show called NBC Nightside. During its run, the show's anchors included Sara James, Bruce Hall, Antonio Mora, Tom Miller, Campbell Brown, Kim Hindrew, Tom Donavan, and Tonya Strong. It was based at NBC Network affiliate WCNC-TV in Charlotte, North Carolina. It provided an overnight news service that NBC affiliates could air until early morning programming began, providing programming to help them stay on the air 24/7. At the time, a few NBC affiliates had begun using CNN's Headline News service to provide overnight programming, and NBC decided to offer the network's own overnight news service. CBS and ABC also began their overnight news programming, as well. In addition, the facility produced a 24-hour news service aimed at Latin American viewers called "Canal de Noticias, NBC. The service closed in 1997, and five years later, the network bought Telemundo.

NBC Nightside lasted until 1998 and was replaced by "NBC All Night," composed of reruns of The Tonight Show with Jay Leno and Late Night with Conan O'Brien, and later, from January 1, 2007, to September 23, 2011, Poker After Dark. NBC now airs same-day repeats of the fourth hour of Today and CNBC's Mad Money on weekdays, LXTV programs on early Sunday mornings, and Meet the Press and Dateline encores on early Monday mornings.

== Units ==
=== Current ===
- NBCUniversal Archives
- NBC News Studios – documentary production unit founded on January 23, 2020
- NBC News Channel – a news video and report feed service similar to a wire service, providing pre-produced international, national and regional stories some with fronting reporters customized for NBC network affiliates. It is based in Charlotte, North Carolina with bureaus in New York City at 30 Rockefeller Plaza, Washington, D.C., on North Capital Street NW, Chicago at the NBC Tower, and in Los Angeles at the Brokaw News Center on the Universal Studios Hollywood Lot with satellite bureaus at WFLA-TV in Tampa, Florida and at KUSA-TV in Denver, Colorado. Its Charlotte headquarters are connected to Charlotte NBC affiliate studios WCNC-TV. NBC News Channel also served as the production base of NBC Nightside and "Canal de Noticias, NBC."
- NBC News Digital Group
  - NBC News Now

=== Former ===
- Peacock Productions
- MSNBC Films

== Bureaus ==
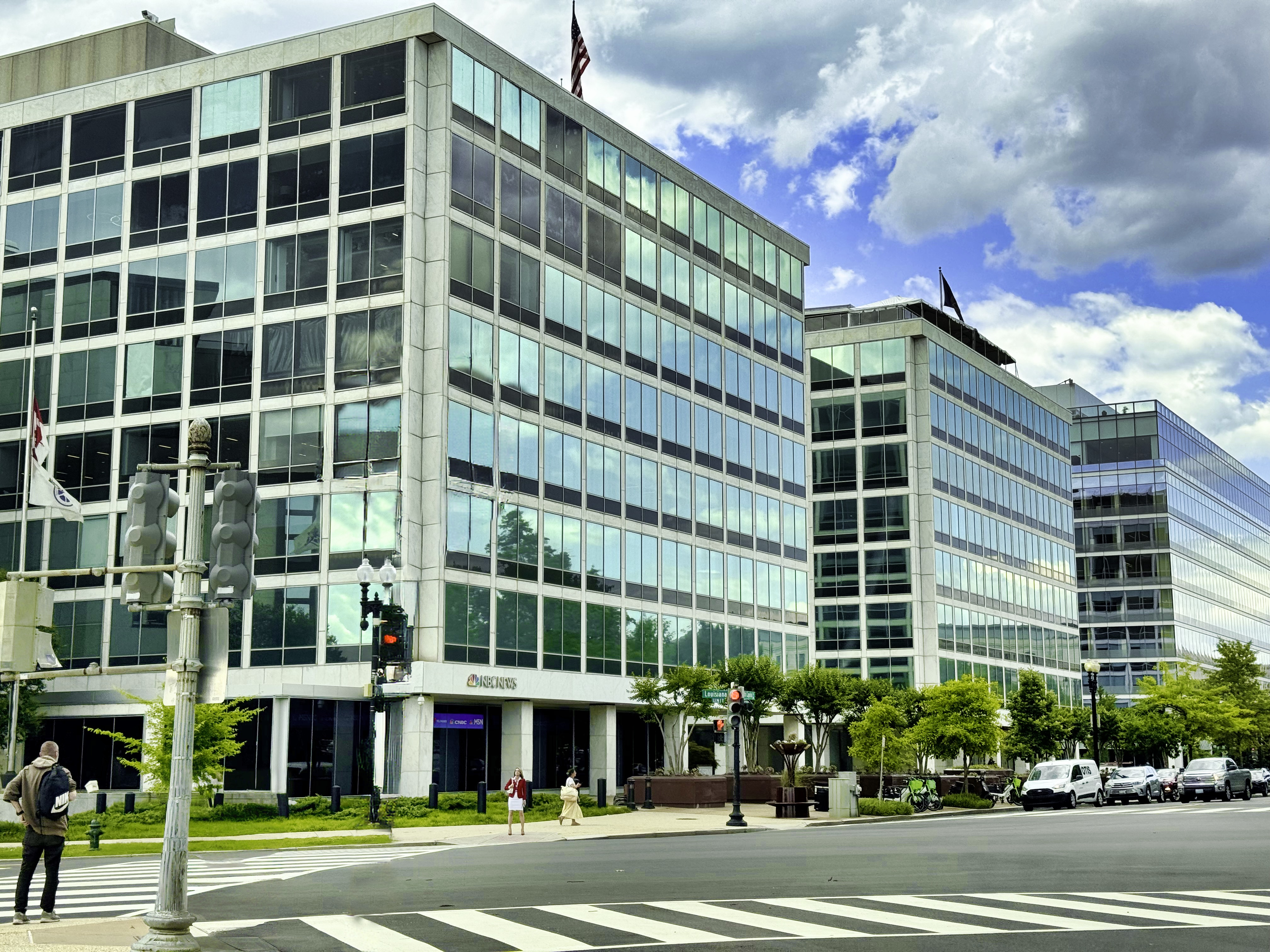
NBC News Washington, D.C. Bureau and Governmental Affairs Headquarters

=== Major bureaus ===
- New York City: NBC News Headquarters (WNBC)^{1}
- Universal City, California (Los Angeles): West Coast Bureau (KNBC)^{1}
- Washington, D.C.: Washington, D.C. Bureau (WRC-TV)^{1}
- Miami, FL: Miami Bureau (Noticias Telemundo)
- London, England, UK: Foreign Desk

=== Minor bureaus (within the United States) ===
- Atlanta (WXIA-TV) ^{3}
- Boston (WBTS–CD) ^{1}
- Chicago (WMAQ-TV) ^{1}
- Denver (KUSA) ^{3}
- Fort Worth – Dallas, Texas (KXAS-TV) ^{1n}
- Houston (KPRC-TV) ^{2}
- Miami – Fort Lauderdale, Florida (WTVJ) ^{1}
- New Britain – Hartford – New Haven, Connecticut (WVIT) ^{1}
- Philadelphia (WCAU) ^{1}
- San Diego (KNSD) ^{1}
- San Jose – San Francisco – Oakland, California (KNTV) ^{1}
- San Juan (WKAQ-TV) ^{1}
- Charlotte (WCNC-TV) ^{3}
- Washington D.C. (WRC-TV) ^{1}
- ^{1} All NBC owned-and-operated stations are considered NBC News bureaus
- ^{2} NBC affiliate owned by Graham Media Group
- ^{3} NBC affiliates owned by Tegna Inc., a subsidiary of Nexstar Media Group

=== Foreign bureaus ===
- Melbourne, Victoria, Australia (NBC News Asia Pacific)
- London, England
- Managua, Nicaragua (Canal 15 Nicaragua-Telemundo 51 WSCV)
- Beijing, China
- Bangkok, Thailand
- Tokyo, Japan
- Tehran, Iran

== Noted coverage ==
NBC News got the first American news interviews from two Russian presidents (Vladimir Putin, Mikhail Gorbachev), and Tom Brokaw was the only American television news correspondent to witness the fall of the Berlin Wall in 1989.

== On-air personnel ==
=== Anchors ===
- Carson Daly – Today Features Anchor (2013–present), Saturday Today co-anchor (2026–), & NBC's The Voice Host (2011–present)
- José Díaz-Balart – NBC Nightly News Saturday Anchor (2016–present) Anchor (2000–present)
- Dylan Dreyer – 3rd Hour Today Co-Anchor (2018–present), Today Weather Anchor (2012–present) & NBC News Meteorologist (2003–present)
- Zinhle Essamuah – Correspondent and co-Anchor, NBC News Daily (2023–present) (on NBC & NBC News Now) (2021–present)
- Joe Fryer – Morning News Now Co-Anchor (2022–present), Saturday Today Features Anchor (2023–present) & Correspondent (2013–present)
- Willie Geist – Sunday Today Anchor (2016–present) Morning Joe Co-Anchor (2007–present) and NBC News Correspondent (2005–present)
- Savannah Guthrie – Today Co-Anchor (2011–present) & NBC News Chief Legal Correspondent (2007–present)
- Jenna Bush Hager – Co-host of Today with Jenna & Sheinelle (2019–present), NBC News Correspondent (2009–present)
- Lester Holt – Anchor of Dateline NBC (2011–present), Anchor (2000–present)
- Hallie Jackson – Senior Washington Correspondent (2014–present) NBC Nightly News Sunday Anchor (2024–present) & Hallie Jackson NOW Anchor (2021–present)
- Laura Jarrett – Weekend Today Co-Anchor & Senior Legal Correspondent (2023–present)
- Sheinelle Jones – Today with Jenna and Sheinelle Co-Host (2026–present) & NBC News correspondent (2014–present)
- Bill Karins – NBC News Now Weather Anchor & NBC News Chief Meteorologist (2004–present)
- Hoda Kotb – Contributing Anchor and Correspondent (1998–present)
- Angie Lassman — Weekend Today Weather Anchor (2023–present) & NBC News Meteorologist (2016–present)
- Tom Llamas – Anchor and Managing Editor, NBC Nightly News (2025–present), Top Story with Tom Llamas Anchor (2021–present) and Anchor (2000–2014; 2021–present)
- Craig Melvin – Today Co-Anchor (2025–present) & 3rd Hour Today Co-Anchor (2018–present) and Correspondent (2008–present)
- Vicky Nguyen – Co-Anchor, NBC News Daily (on NBC & NBC News Now) (2022–present) & NBC News Chief Consumer Investigative Correspondent (2007–2019; 2019–present)
- Morgan Radford – Co-Anchor, NBC News Daily (on NBC & NBC News Now) (2021–present) & NBC News Correspondent (2015–present)
- Al Roker – Chief NBC News Meteorologist (1978–present), Today Weather & Features Anchor (1996–present), and 3rd Hour Today Co-Anchor (2018–present)
- Christine Romans – Anchor, Current with Christine Romans (2026–present) and Chief Business Correspondent (2023–present)
- Steven Romo – NBC News Correspondent and NBC News NOW Anchor (2021–present)
- Gadi Schwartz – Host for Stay Tuned (2017–present) & Stay Tuned NOW (2023–present), Correspondent (2013–present)
- Savannah Sellers – Morning News Now Co-Anchor (2020–present), Stay Tuned Co-Anchor (2017–present) & Correspondent (2010–present)
- Kate Snow – Co-Anchor, NBC News Daily (2022–present) & Senior National Correspondent (2010–present)
- Kristen Welker – Meet the Press Moderator (2023–present) Anchor/Reporter (2005–present)

=== US-based correspondents and reporters ===
- Julia Ainsley – Justice Department and Department of Homeland Security Correspondent
- Yamiche Alcindor – White House Correspondent
- Blayne Alexander – Dateline NBC Correspondent (2008–2009, 2017–present)
- Jonathan Allen – Political Reporter (2017–present)
- Ellison Barber – New York City-based Correspondent (2020–present)
- Andrea Canning – Dateline NBC Correspondent (2012–present)
- Morgan Chesky – Correspondent (2018–present)
- Brian Cheung – Business and Data Correspondent (2012–2015, 2022–present)
- Tom Costello – Senior Correspondent (1995–present)
- Aaron Gilchrist – National Correspondent (2010–present)
- Stephanie Gosk – Senior National Correspondent (2006–present)
- Gabe Gutierrez – Senior White House Correspondent (2012–present)
- Garrett Haake – Chief White House Correspondent (2008–2012, 2017–present)
- Kaylee Hartung – Freelance Contributing Correspondent (2023–present)
- Steve Kornacki – National Political Correspondent (2012–present)
- Courtney Kube – Senior National Security Correspondent (2001–present)
- Josh Mankiewicz – Dateline NBC Correspondent (1995–present)
- Chloe Melas – Entertainment Correspondent (2023–present)
- Andrea Mitchell – Chief Foreign Affairs & Chief Washington Correspondent (1978–present)
- Keith Morrison – Dateline NBC Correspondent (1986–1992, 1995–present)
- Dennis Murphy – Dateline NBC Correspondent (1982–1994, 1994–present)
- Ryan Nobles – Chief Capitol Hill Correspondent (2022–present)
- Kelly O'Donnell – Chief Justice and National Affairs Correspondent (1994–present)
- Shannon Pettypiece – Senior White House Correspondent (2019–present)
- Anne Thompson – Chief Environmental Affairs Correspondent (1997–present)
- John Torres – Senior Medical Correspondent (2015–present)
- Maggie Vespa – Chicago–based Correspondent (2022–present)
- Yasmin Vossoughian – Correspondent (2017–present)

=== International correspondents and reporters ===
- Richard Engel – Chief Foreign Correspondent (2003–present)
- Daniele Hamamdjian – London-based Foreign Correspondent (2024–present)
- Molly Hunter – London-based Foreign Correspondent (2019–present)
- Janis Mackey Frayer – Beijing-based Foreign Correspondent (2016–present)
- Keir Simmons – Chief International Correspondent (2012–present)

=== Contributors and analysts ===
- Jeremy Bash – Senior National Security Analyst
- Vin Gupta – Medical Contributor
- Nikki Haley – NBC News Political Contributor
- Maria Shriver – NBC News Special Anchor (1986–2004, 2013–present)
- Joanna Stern – Tech Contributor (2019–present)
- Meredith Vieira – Special Correspondent (2006–present)

=== Former staff ===
- Elie Abel
- Bob Abernethy
- Dan Abrams
- Stephanie Abrams
- Martin Agronsky
- Tazeen Ahmad
- Peter Alexander (2004–2026)
- Natalie Allen
- Miguel Almaguer (2006–2024)
- Leigh Ann Caldwell (2014–2022)
- Jodi Applegate
- Bob Arnot (1996–2004)
- Jane Arraf
- Tom Aspell
- Jim Avila
- Ashleigh Banfield
- Tiki Barber
- Jay Barbree
- Martin Bashir
- Robert Bazell (1976–2013)
- Geoff Bennett
- Jim Bittermann
- Frank Blair
- David Bloom
- Mike Boettcher
- Frank Bourgholtzer
- Dave Briggs
- David Brinkley
- Tom Brokaw (1966–2021)
- Ned Brooks
- Campbell Brown (1995–2006)
- Christina Brown
- Erin Burnett
- Dasha Burns (2016–2024)
- Billy Bush
- Dylan Byers
- Virginia Cha
- Henry Champ
- John Chancellor
- Connie Chung (1983–1989, 2005–2006)
- Chris Cimino
- Chelsea Clinton (2011–2014)
- Ben Collins
- Robert Conley
- Kevin Corke
- Katie Couric (1987–2006)
- Lee Cowan (2007–2011)
- Tiffany Cross (2020–2022)
- Veronica De La Cruz
- Jim Cummins
- Ann Curry (1990–2015)
- Faith Daniels
- Bill Dedman
- Lloyd Dobyns
- Tony Dokoupil (2013–2016)
- Phil Donahue
- Bob Dotson (1975–2015)
- Hugh Downs
- Maurice DuBois
- Paul Duke
- Rosey Edeh
- Linda Ellerbee
- Josh Elliott
- Rehema Ellis (1994–2025)
- Bonnie Erbe
- Giselle Fernández
- Elise Finch
- Howard Fineman
- Martin Fletcher (1977–2010)
- Jack Ford
- Eliot Frankel
- Michelle Franzen (2001–2013)
- Pauline Frederick
- Dawna Friesen (1999–2010)
- Betty Furness
- Jamie Gangel (1983–2014)
- Joe Garagiola
- Anne Garrels
- Dave Garroway
- Kendis Gibson
- Kathie Lee Gifford (2008–2019)
- Alexis Glick
- Robert Goralski
- Ed Gordon
- Peter Greenberg
- David Gregory (1994–2014)
- Bryant Gumbel (1975–1997)
- Tony Guida
- Peter Hackes
- Robert Hager (1960s–2004)
- Sara Haines
- Tamron Hall (2007–2017)
- Mark Halperin
- Steve Handelsman (1984–2017)
- Chris Hansen (1993–2013)
- Nanette Hansen
- Richard C. Harkness
- Don Harris
- John Hart (1975–1988)
- Jim Hartz
- Mehdi Hasan (2020–2024)
- Bob Herbert (1991–1993)
- George Hicks
- Erica Hill (2012–2016)
- John Hockenberry
- Chet Huntley
- Kasie Hunt (2013–2021)
- Abby Huntsman
- Gwen Ifill
- Michael Isikoff (2010–2014)
- Bob Jamieson (1970–1990)
- Joshua Johnson (2020–2022)
- Kristine Johnson
- Bernard Kalb
- Marvin Kalb (1980–1994)
- Floyd Kalber
- Herb Kaplow
- Arthur Kent
- Jo Ling Kent (2016–2022)
- Sara Lee Kessler
- Douglas Kiker
- Emory King
- Dan Kloeffler
- Michelle Kosinski (2005–2014)
- Bob Kur (1973–2006)
- Sue Kwon
- Kelly Lange
- Margaret Larson (1990–1994, 1997–2001)
- Matt Lauer (1992–2017)
- Tammy Leitner
- Don Lemon
- Jack Lescoulie
- Irving R. Levine
- George Lewis (1969–2012)
- Lilia Luciano
- Bill Macatee (1982–1990)
- Jim Maceda (1981–2015)
- Cassie Mackin
- Robert MacNeil
- Jeff Madrick
- Suzanne Malveaux
- Boyd Matson (1974–1992)
- Chris Matthews (1994–2020)
- John MacVane
- Cynthia McFadden
- Frank McGee
- Sean McLaughlin
- Erin McPike
- Maria Menounos
- Jim Miklaszewski (1985–2016)
- Keith Miller (1977–2014)
- Bill Monroe
- Natalie Morales (1998–2021)
- Alison Morris (2002–2004, 2019–2022)
- Rob Morrison
- Ron Mott (2005–2020)
- Roger Mudd
- Merrill Mueller
- Lisa Myers (1981–2014)
- Amna Nawaz
- Roy Neal
- Bill Neely (2014–2021)
- Ron Nessen
- Jackie Nespral
- Edwin Newman
- Hans Nichols (2016–2020)
- Deborah Norville
- Soledad O'Brien
- Norah O'Donnell (1999–2011)
- Michael Okwu
- Keith Olbermann (1997–1998, 2003–2011)
- John Palmer
- Jane Pauley (1976–2005, 2009–2014)
- Jack Perkins
- Tom Pettit
- Katie Phang (2017–2025)
- Stone Phillips (1992–2007)
- James Polk
- Gabe Pressman
- Norma Quarles (1965–1988)
- Charles Quinn
- Jacob Rascon
- Jill Rappaport (1991–2015)
- Chip Reid
- Joy Reid (2000–2004; 2011–2025)
- John Rich
- Frances Rivera (2014–2026)
- Amy Robach (2003–2012)
- Deborah Roberts (1990–1995)
- John Roland
- Betty Rollin
- Brian Ross (1974–1994)
- Jeff Rossen (2008–2019)
- Ford Rowan
- Tim Russert
- Bill Ryan
- Aline Saarinen
- Charles Sabine
- Kerry Sanders (1991–2023)
- Martin Savidge (2004–2008)
- Jessica Savitch
- Chuck Scarborough(1974–2024)
- Steve Schmidt
- Mara Schiavocampo
- Mike Schneider
- Willard Scott
- John Seigenthaler (1996–2007)
- Scott Simon
- Gene Shalit
- Janet Shamlian (2005–2019)
- Walter Sheridan
- Claire Shipman
- David Shuster
- Carole Simpson (1974–1982)
- Ian K. Smith
- Lynn Smith
- Harry Smith (2011–2024)
- Tom Snyder
- Tabitha Soren
- Lawrence E. Spivak
- John Cameron Swayze
- Nancy Snyderman (2006–2015)
- Rob Stafford (1996–2006)
- Mike Taibbi (1984–1987, 1997–2014)
- Kat Tenbarge
- Len Tepper
- Somara Theodore (2016–2022)
- Patricia Thompson
- Chuck Todd (2007–2025)
- Liz Trotta
- Lem Tucker
- Garrick Utley
- Richard Valeriani
- Charles Van Doren
- Sander Vanocur
- Elizabeth Vargas (1993–1996)
- Linda Vester
- Mike Viqueira (1997–2004, 2009–2013)
- Lindsey Vonn
- Chris Wallace (1975–1989)
- Barbara Walters
- Jacob Ward (2018–2024)
- Mark Whitaker
- Fredricka Whitfield
- Brian Williams (1993–2021)
- Colleen Williams
- Pete Williams (1993–2022)
- Mary Alice Williams
- Brad Willis (1989–1993)
- Joe Witte (1983–2010)
- Jenna Wolfe (2007–2016)
- Lew Wood
- Judy Woodruff (1975–1982)
- John Yang (2007–2016)
- Tony Zappone

== International broadcasts ==
In the 2000s, MSNBC was shown on sister network CNBC Europe, both in scheduled slots and during breaking news, although rebroadcasts of MSNBC have stopped. However, Meet the Press is still shown on the channel, while NBC News NOW rebroadcasts Meet the Press, Today and NBC Nightly News.

In the Philippines, NBC Nightly News and Today were previously both shown on 9TV (formerly Talk TV and Solar News Channel; now as RPTV), while Early Today was officially dropped from the network in December 2013, but they replaced by the repeats of Inside Edition, while Today dropped it in September 2014 to make room for the weekend children's programming and NBC Nightly News was the last to dropped it in March 2015, due to the firing of Brian Williams as anchor and the move of Lester Holt to main anchor position as well as the anticipation of rebranding of the said network to CNN Philippines in March of the same year (both Nightly News and Today were both previously aired on ETC from 2004 to 2005 and the now defunct 2nd Avenue from 2005 to 2007; Nightly News was later moved to C/S 9 (later Solar TV) from 2008 to 2011, while Today retains it separately on 2nd Avenue until 2011). After five years of not airing it in the Philippine airwaves, both NBC Nightly News and Today returned in November 2020 as the launch programs of TAP TV (NBC Nightly News was later moved to its sister network TAP Edge from January to October 2021, until they returned it to the said network in October 2021). TAP TV may also occasionally air special coverage from NBC News, including the U.S. Elections every 2 years and the U.S. Presidential Inauguration every 4 years, as well as breaking news during regular broadcasts of Today. NBC Nightly News, along with the full program lineup of NBC, was carried by affiliate VSB-TV in Bermuda until 2014.

The Seven Network in Australia has close ties with NBC and has used a majority of the network's imaging and slogans since the 1970s. Seven News has featured The Mission as its news theme since the mid-1980s. Local newscasts were named Seven Nightly News from the mid-1980s until around 2000. NBC and Seven will often share news resources between the two countries. NBC News has been known to use Seven News reporters for live reports on a developing news story in Australia. Seven News will sometimes also incorporate an NBC News report into its national bulletins. Today, Weekend Today and Meet the Press are all broadcast on the Seven Network during the early morning hours from 3-5 a.m., just before Seven's morning show Sunrise.

In Hong Kong, NBC Nightly News is live digital television broadcast transmission (or delayed) on TVB Pearl daily from 7:00 am until 8:00 am Hong Kong Time (6:00 pm until 7:00 pm New York City Time).

In the United Kingdom, the ITV network used to air segments from NBC Nightly News on its ITV News at 5:30 morning newscast before it was canceled in December 2012. NBC News shares facilities and crew in the UK with ITN, which is the news provider for ITV. NBC News Now is shown as a linear channel on both the Sky and Virgin Media platforms in the UK. NBC News Now has been removed from these platforms as of December 2023 but remains free to view via YouTube.

== Theme music ==
Meet the Press, NBC Nightly News, and special breaking news reports use movements from "The Mission" by John Williams as their themes. The composition was first used by NBC in 1985 and was updated in 2004. "Scherzo for Today," the third movement, was in use by Today until 2013, when it was replaced by a new theme by Alan Gubman.

== See also ==
=== Main competitors ===
- ABC News
- CBS News
