= Patty Thompson =

Patty Thompson may refer to:

- Patty Thompson (swimmer) (born 1945), Canadian Olympic swimmer
- Patty Thompson, a character in the Soul Eater manga and anime series

== See also ==
- Patricia Thompson (producer) (1947–2010), American television producer and documentary filmmaker
