= Hooray for Hollywood =

1937 song by Richard A. Whiting and Johnny Mercer

"Hooray for Hollywood" is a popular song first featured in the 1937 movie Hollywood Hotel, and which has since become (together with "That's Entertainment" and "There's No Business like Show Business") the staple soundtrack element of any Academy Awards ceremony. It is even frequently played during non-American movie ceremonies, e.g. the French César Awards. The popularity of the song is notably due to an exciting and memorable melody and lyrics by Johnny Mercer, which reference the American movie industry and satirize the desire to become a Hollywood movie star.

The music was composed by Richard A. Whiting. Johnny Mercer wrote the lyrics. In the original movie it was sung by Johnnie Davis and Frances Langford, accompanied by Benny Goodman and his orchestra.

== Doris Day's Version ==
Doris Day had changed the lyrics in her version, as the lyrics were difficult to fully understand in the original, as they refer to people such as Aimee Semple or Shirley Temple which have since been largely forgotten today. In the original lyrics the line "where any shopgirl can be a top girl, if she pleases the tired businessman" vanished quickly to go with a more appropriate and modern time in the Doris Day's version and her self titled album of the song, having been replaced with "and any barmaid can be a star made if she dances with or without a fan.” The latter part of the line refers to fan dancing. A full modern orchestra was accompanied with Doris Day.

In the Doris Day recording, she mentions Marilyn Monroe to keep up to date with the outdated lyrics of the recording.

The first national news bulletin of the Media coverage of the assassination of John F. Kennedy was transmitted over the ABC Radio Network at 12:36 p.m. CST/1:36 p.m. EST. The network was airing the Music in the Afternoon program hosted by Dirk Fredericks and Joel Crager, and Doris Day's recording of "Hooray for Hollywood" was playing when newscaster Don Gardiner had to interrupt the song to make the announcement of President John F. Kennedy's death in 1963.

It also includes reference to Walt Disney and his cartoon character with the lines of "You might be Donald Duck."

- Rock band Hollywood Undead sampled the Doris Day version of this song in their live pre-set introduction.
- The Doris Day version is used in Ray Donovan Episodes 01 – Season 1 "The Bag or the Bat" (2013).

== Usage ==
- The song is used in the opening scene of the Looney Tunes cartoon What's Up, Doc? (1950).
- The melody was used on the Jack Benny radio show as the final theme song.
- The song is played over the opening and closing shots of Robert Altman's film The Long Goodbye (1973) starring Elliott Gould as Philip Marlowe.
- In 1977, the song was performed twice during an episode of The Brady Bunch Variety Hour. Some lyrics were altered to reference then-current pop-culture ("If you find things get rough, you could get Pufnstuf..." and "...where any person like Laverne or Shirley or Jo Anne Worley is equally understood").
- The song is featured in the musical A Day in Hollywood/A Night in the Ukraine.
- The song was used as the opening and exit to Disney-MGM Studios' The Great Movie Ride attraction. This version became one of the many California related songs played throughout "Sunshine Plaza" in the original Disney's California Adventure.
- Jay Leno on the Tonight Show often did take-offs of Rodney Dangerfield's schtick, telling bandleader Kevin Eubanks; "Kevin, the economy is so bad that..." After the punchline, the Tonight Show Band played a fast melody of "Hooray for Hollywood".
- In the Disney Channel original movie Phantom of The Megaplex Mickey Rooney's character “Movie Mason” sings the tail end of the song in front of the theatre for the premiere of the movie.
- In The Simpsons episode "Mayored to the Mob", the cast members of a production of Guys and Dolls sing a song with the musical's title to the tune of "Hooray for Hollywood", which, as the show's star Mark Hamill points out, isn't actually one of that show's musical numbers.
- In The Simpsons episode "You Only Move Twice", Waylon Smithers sings to himself "I work for Monty Burns" to the melody of Hooray for Hollywood.
- A cha-cha instrumental version of the song was used as bumper music for David Feeney's short-lived "Hollywood Minute" segment on the popular podcast Daves of Thunder. An identical recording was used as the theme song for the pilot of It's Always Sunny in Philadelphia, as stated by Charlie Day, because the series was going to take place in Los Angeles.
- A simplified score of the melody decorates the banisters in the Hollywood/Vine Red Line Station in Los Angeles leading down to the platform.
- The song is used in the opening of Warren Beatty's film Rules Don't Apply (2016).
- The song is performed in the 1978 film Sextette starring 87-year-old Mae West, which was her final film.
- The Doris Day version is played over the closing credits of the Only Murders in the Building season 4 finale, "My Best Friend's Wedding".
- In History of the World, Part I, in the Roman Empire segment, the song plays as Mel Brooks' character Comicus' introduction right before his performance for the emperor.
- A version of the song arranged by John Powell is played over the final scene of the 2026 animated film Minions & Monsters.

== See also ==
- "There's No Business Like Show Business"
- "That's Entertainment!"
- "Make 'Em Laugh"
