= Ford Rowan =

Ford Rowan was a television reporter for NBC News and panelist on Meet the Press during the 1970s and early 1980s. During his tenure with the network, he covered mostly military and security-related issues. Rowan also served as an adjunct professor at the Washington bureau of the Medill School of Journalism at Northwestern University.

After leaving NBC, he hosted a discussion program featuring foreign television journalists stationed in the U.S., International Edition, produced by the Maryland Center for Public Broadcasting (now Maryland Public Television) for PBS.

In 1984, Rowan left the journalistic field to found, with partner Richard Blewitt, Rowan and Blewitt, a consulting firm that advises companies on public relations crises. Rowan is based out of Annapolis, Maryland.
