= Morgan Chesky =

American television journalist

- Born: 1986 (age 39–40)
- Occupation: NBC News correspondent
- Spouse: Olivia Jane Steele
- Children: 1

Morgan Chesky (born 1986) is a national NBC News correspondent. He was raised in Kerrville, Texas, and attended Sam Houston State University. Previously, he was a news anchor in Seattle.

Chesky was hospitalized for high-altitude pulmonary edema in May 2023. He suffered from the health scare while hiking with his uncle to celebrate his 37th birthday.

On May 25, 2023, Chesky and his wife welcomed their first-born daughter named Eleanor Mae.
