= Ron Mott =

American journalist

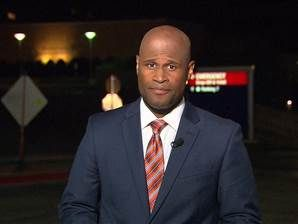
- Born: Kansas City, Kansas, United States
- Education: University of Missouri; Columbia University
- Occupation: Television journalist
- Years active: 1999–2020

Ron Mott is an American television news correspondent. He formerly worked for NBC News, and was a regular contributor to Today, NBC Nightly News, and MSNBC.

== Early life and education ==
Ron Mott was born in Kansas City, Kansas. He graduated from Northeast (KCMO) High School. Mott earned a bachelor's degree in political science from the University of Missouri and a master's degree from Columbia University Graduate School of Journalism.

== Career ==
Mott began his television career as a news reporter and fill-in anchor for WVNY in Burlington, Vermont and later KSHB in Kansas City, Missouri. He won a national Emmy Award for coverage of President Barack Obama's 2008 election, reporting from Africa. He's also received numerous Emmy nominations, including for his coverage of Hurricane Katrina. He was an NBC News correspondent from May 2005-January 2020, and was based in Chicago, Boston and Atlanta. Mott also was an assistant at The Early Show/Saturday on CBS.

Mott covered two Olympic Games (Vancouver, 2010, and Rio, 2016) for NBC, as well as assignments across the world.

He's also worked for the Kansas City Star/Times, National Collegiate Athletic Association (NCAA), Kansas City Chiefs, former Jack Nicklaus-owned Executive Sports International, KPMG, as well as advertising/publishing companies in New York City and the Palm Beaches, in Florida.

Mott also holds a private pilot's license.
