= Gabe Gutierrez =

American journalist

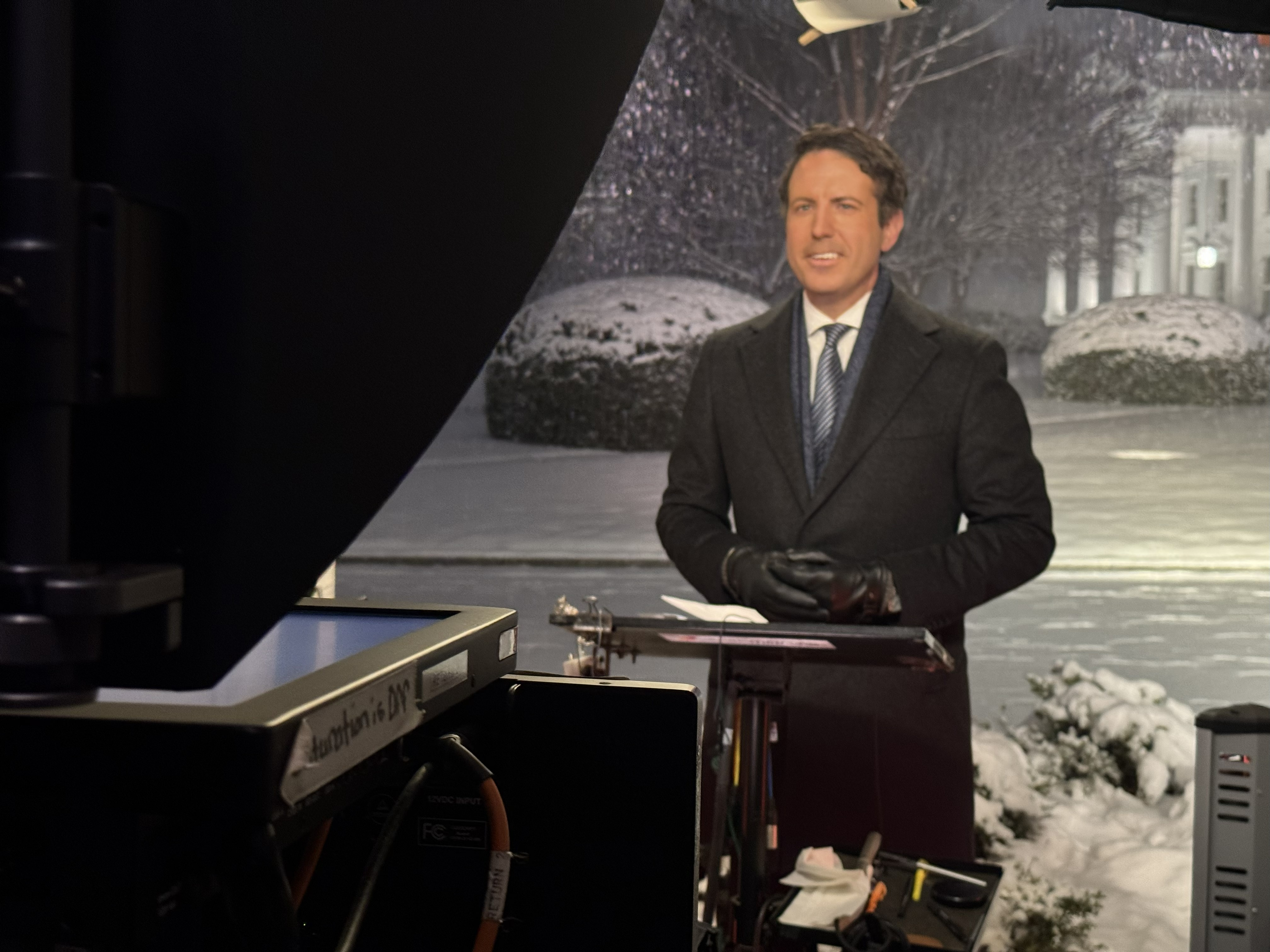
- Education: Northwestern University (BS)
- Occupation: Correspondent
- Employer: NBC News (2012-present)

Gabe Gutierrez is an American journalist. He is the Senior White House Correspondent for NBC News. He took over his current role from Kristen Welker who is the current moderator of Meet the Press.

== Education ==
Gutierrez earned two Bachelor of Science degrees in journalism and political science from Northwestern University. He completed internships at Telemundo and ABC News while in college.

== Career ==
Gutierrez began his career in 2005 at local TV stations, including WBOY-TV (NBC affiliate in West Virginia), WJRT-TV (ABC station in Michigan), and KHOU-TV (CBS affiliate in Texas).

In 2012, he joined NBC News, initially based in Atlanta, Georgia, where he covered major national and international events. He was part of the NBC Nightly News team that received an Alfred I. duPont-Columbia University Award for coverage of the 2013 tornado in Moore, Oklahoma.

In 2016, Gutierrez was among the first reporters on the scene at the Pulse nightclub shooting in Orlando, Florida. He also covered the Republican primaries during the 2016 U.S. presidential election and later reported from Charlottesville, Virginia, following the deadly white nationalist rally in 2017. In the same year, he reported on the impact of Hurricanes Harvey, Irma, and Maria throughout Texas, Florida, and Puerto Rico.
