= Brian Cheung =

American journalist

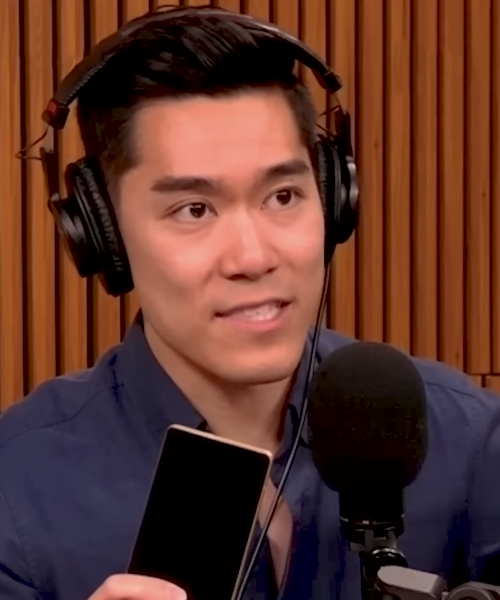
- Cheung in 2026
- Education: Syracuse University
- Occupation: Journalist
- Employer: NBC News

Brian Cheung is a business and data correspondent for NBC News. His reports appear on Today, NBC Nightly News, and NBC News Now.

Cheung has a dual major in finance, broadcast, digital journalism, and a minor in Chinese studies, having been to Syracuse University and Johns Hopkins University Advanced Academic Programs. While he attended Syracuse University, Cheung first started at NBC News as an intern at NBCUniversal in 2012 at their business development department, and was also an intern at their news department in 2013. He then went overseas to Hong Kong to be an intern at The Global Institute for Tomorrow for three months in 2013, then back to New York City and Englewood Cliffs, New Jersey at NBCUniversal and CNBC, working at their assignment desks from 2014 to 2015. He then graduated with a 3.8 GPA and received many awards and scholarships. Cheung started his career as an analyst at the Federal Reserve for a year and then worked at Yahoo Finance as a writer, on-air reporter, and anchor.

In 2022, Cheung rejoined NBC News and was made a reporter for their Business and Technology Unit. In this role, he covered various economic topics, which include inflation, jobs reports, retail sales, the Collapse of Silicon Valley Bank, and the 2023 United States banking crisis. In December 2023, NBC News promoted him to business and data correspondent, continuing to cover business and economic issues and reports across all NBC News platforms, especially digital.
