= Molly Hunter (journalist) =

American journalist

- Education: Williams College (BA)
- Years active: 2009–present
- Employer: NBC News
- Spouse: William (m. 2023)
- Children: 1

Molly Hunter is an American journalist and news correspondent at NBC News based in London. She was previously at ABC News based in Jerusalem and London.

== Early life and education ==
Hunter graduated from Williams College in Williamstown, Massachusetts with a Bachelor of Arts degree in Political Science and International Relations. She was awarded the first Jeffrey Owen Jones '66 Journalism Fellowship.

== Career ==
After graduating, she worked at ABC News. She reported from Jerusalem, and in 2017 and 2023 she won Emmy Awards for Outstanding Feature Story in a Newscast. The 2017 award was won for traveling with a Syrian refugee family from the Turkish-Syrian border to Germany. In 2023, her team won for a documentary on Ukraine called “A Mother’s War.”

After eight years at ABC, she moved to NBC News in 2019 as a correspondent, reporting from New York, Los Angeles, and Chicago. She moved back to London as a foreign correspondent in 2019.

In 2025, while reporting on the Trump administration's desire to take Greenland, she also reported on both JD Vance and Usha Vance about their planned trip to Greenland by hitting both Vances with a harsh truth about the trip (which had been scaled back to a national security trip, etc.), that no one was pleased about the trip, they cancelled the whole thing. Her sentiment was praised after she said, "The message from locals is clear: Greenland was not for sale."

== Personal life ==
In 2023, she married her husband William in London. In 2024, she announced that she was pregnant with her first child while reporting live from Buckingham Palace on Today.
