= John Torres (medical journalist) =

American medical journalist

- Education: University of New Mexico School of Medicine
- Occupations: Medical journalist and emergency physician
- Employer: NBC News
- Awards: Recipient of George Polk Awards; American Medical Association Journalist of the Year award

John Torres is an American news medical correspondent, physician, and humanitarian. He works at NBC News as a senior medical correspondent, on Today, NBC Nightly News and NBC News Now. He is also an emergency room physician and a former US Air Force veteran and pilot.

== Early life and education ==
Torres graduated from the United States Air Force Academy, then served in the United States Air Force. Later, he graduated with a medical degree from the University of New Mexico School of Medicine.

== Career ==
He began his TV career as an emergency room doctor in southern Colorado, and contributed to the NBC affiliates KOAA and KUSA, where he answered viewers' medical questions and reported on news stories while continuing his practice as an emergency room physician.

In 2015, Torres joined NBC News and MSNBC starting as a contributor before being promoted in 2017 as senior medical correspondent full-time.

In 2021, Torres released a book called "Dr. Disaster's Guide to Surviving Everything" and remains an active emergency medical doctor.
