= Julia Ainsley =

American TV journalist

- Education: Davidson College
- Employer: NBC News
- Spouse: Newman Ainsley
- Children: 2

Julia Edwards Ainsley is an American journalist currently working at NBC News as a senior correspondent based in Washington, D.C. covering the Department of Justice and Department of Homeland Security for NBC News' investigation reports.

== Early life and education ==
Edwards graduated in 2009 from Davidson College in North Carolina. She received a master's degree in journalism from Northwestern University.

In 2013 she worked at Thomson Reuters as a criminal justice correspondent and White House correspondent covering counterterrorism, immigration, and criminal justice reform from Reuters' Washington bureau. She then worked at NBC News from 2017 as a national security and justice reporter covering the Department of Justice and Department of Homeland Security.

In 2022 Ainsley was promoted to homeland security correspondent, and covers the Department of Justice and Department of Homeland Security.

Ainsley's book Undue Process: The Inside Story of Trump's Mass Deportation Program was published by HarperCollins in 2026.

== Personal life ==
Ainsley married Newman Ainsley, and the couple has two daughters. In 2019, while she was pregnant, she began to have a bout of morning sickness while she was on-air live on MSNBC giving a report, and it forced her to step off-camera before it was later revealed that she was expecting. In 2021, they had their second child.

Ainsley is an Episcopalian and a member of the Christ Church Georgetown vestry.
