= Patricia Thompson (producer) =

American television producer and documentary filmmaker

- Born: August 14, 1947; Chicago, Illinois
- Died: December 20, 2010 (aged 63); Paris, France
- Spouse: Jim Bittermann

Patricia Thompson (August 14, 1947 – December 20, 2010) was a Paris-based American television producer and documentary filmmaker.

== Biography ==
Thompson began her career at the NBC Chicago station WMAQ-TV in the 1970s. She later moved to Paris in 1975 to work as a radio reporter and then became a senior producer for NBC News in Europe, covering the revolutions in Iran and the Philippines; the marriage and death of Diana, Princess of Wales; and the Soviet-American disarmament negotiations.

She later created her own production company, producing programs and documentaries for American networks and cable channels, and covering news events such as the celebrations of the bicentennial of the French revolution.

Her documentary The Cheese Nun, a profile of Sister Noella, a Benedictine nun who upon being made cheese-maker of her abbey in Connecticut, studied microbiology and crisscrossed France to study cheeses, was broadcast by PBS in the United States in 2006.

Thompson won two Emmy awards for her work in Africa and the United States. She was also the French producer for a segment of the CBS show The Amazing Race.

== Education ==
She graduated from the University of Illinois in 1969 and earned a master's degree in urban studies and law at Loyola University Chicago in 1973.

In addition to her career as a TV and film producer, she was a professor of Global Communications at the American University in Paris from 1997 where she created a program on video news production.
