= Jim Bittermann =

American journalist

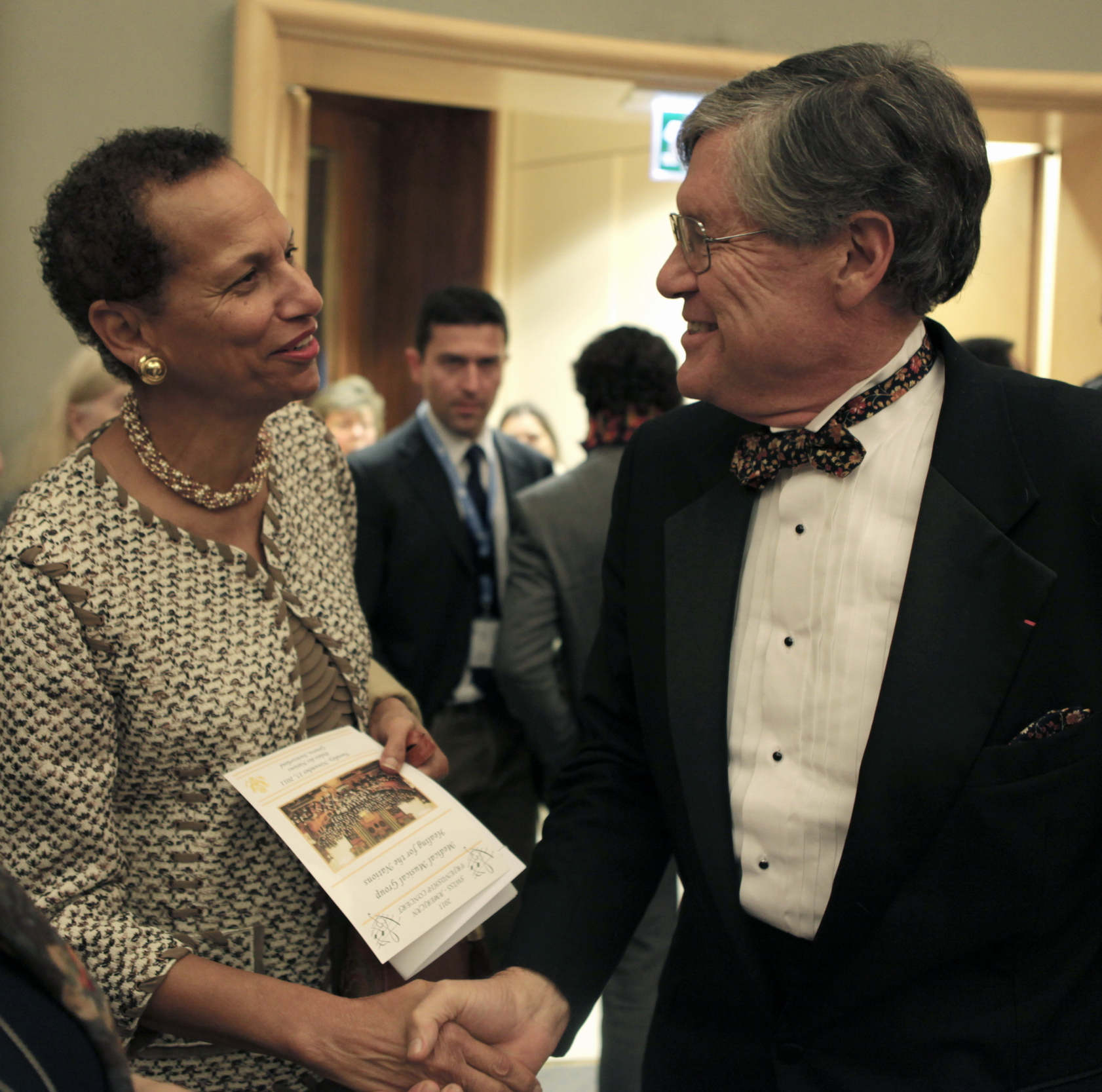
Jim Bittermann (right) with Betty E. King (2011)

Jim Bittermann is Senior European correspondent for CNN since 1996.

== Career ==
Bittermann graduated with a Bachelor of Science degree from Southern Illinois University in 1970 and began in print journalism from 1965 to 1970 as a reporter for the Waukegan News-Sun in Waukegan, Illinois. His television career began at WTMJ-TV in Milwaukee from 1970 to 1972. From 1972 to 1973 he worked at WQED-TV in Pittsburgh and 1973 to 1975 he was as a reporter for WKYC-TV in Cleveland, Ohio. Bittermann was with CBC News as a Toronto-based correspondent and producer for CBC News Magazine from 1975 to 1978.

From 1978–1990, he was a European correspondent for NBC News. Based in Rome from 1978–1979, he covered two Papal transitions and the travels of Pope John Paul II. From 1980–1990, he was based in Paris. While there, he reported on many of the decade's major international stories in Eastern Europe, Northern and Western Africa, the Middle East, the Philippines, Japan and the Soviet Union. He received a national news Emmy Award for his coverage of the 1988 Sudan famine.

He became Paris correspondent for ABC News from 1990 to 1996. He has reported wars and revolutions in the Mideast, Africa and eastern Europe as well as such stories as the Soccer World Cup, the travels of Pope John Paul II, and Princess Diana's death in 1997. In 2015, he covered the devastating terrorist attacks in Paris for which he and the CNN team shared in the Royal Television Society Breaking News Award in 2016

Since 1998, Bittermann has been an assistant adjunct professor of communications at The American University of Paris. 2015 marked his 50th year in journalism.

Bittermann's wife, Emmy-winning television producer Patricia Thompson, died in 2010. The couple's one daughter, Dr. Tess Bittermann, is a gastroenterologist at the University of Pennsylvania Hospital in Philadelphia. In April, 2017, Bittermann married Mary Jean Lowe, a counselor at the American School of Paris.

Bittermann serves on the board of governors of the American Hospital of Paris and the board of trustees of the Centre des Etudes des Communications Internationales.

== Awards ==
He was awarded the French Legion of Honor on January 1, 2009.

- Royal Television Society Group award for coverage of the Paris Terrorism Attacks
- An individual National Emmy for coverage of the Sudan Famine and group National Emmys for various NBC News programs
- CableACE Award for CNN's coverage of the civil war in Zaire
- Southern Illinois University's Journalism Alumnus of the Year 1989
- SIU Alumni Achievement Award 2000.
