= William R. McAndrew =

American journalist

William R. McAndrew (September 7, 1914 - May 30, 1968) was the director of NBC News from 1951 until his death in 1968.

McAndrew was born in Washington, D.C. in 1914, and started his career in journalism by becoming a part-time reporter for The Washington Herald in 1935 just before graduating from Catholic University. He was with UPI for two years and then joined NBC News. In 1942, he joined the Board of Economic Warfare of six months, and then joined ABC News for 18 months before returning to NBC. In 1951, he became the manager of network news and oversaw the network's news under growing titles, becoming the president of NBC News in 1965.

McAndrew was a leader in the development of television journalism. He created The Huntley–Brinkley Report, using two anchors located in different cities. He won a Peabody Award in 1962, a Personal Award for his "vision and leadership" as NBC News' Executive Vice-President.

He died at age 53, a few days after being injured in a fall. He was survived by his wife, three children, and three grandchildren. His daughter Mary also became a journalist, and son William (Bill) Jr. worked in media relations at NBC News for many years.
