= Peter Hackes =

American journalist

Peter Hackes (June 2, 1924 – April 17, 1994) was a longtime American TV and radio correspondent who late in life had acting roles in two prominent American films.

== Early life and education ==
Born in New York City, Peter Sidney Hackes graduated from Grinnell College and then earned a master's degree in journalism in 1949 from the University of Iowa, where he served as the city editor of the university’s WSUI radio station. He served in the Navy during World War II, and retired as a captain from the naval reserves in the mid-1980s.

== Broadcasting career ==
Early in his career, Hackes worked for radio stations in Iowa, New York, Ohio and Kentucky. He then began a three-year stint working at CBS in 1952. Starting in 1955, Hackes spent 30 years based in Washington, D.C., working for NBC, both as a TV correspondent and as a radio correspondent.

In his years at NBC, Hackes covered Capitol Hill, the State Department and NASA, and worked every national political convention from 1956 to 1986. Hackes won an Emmy award for his coverage of the Apollo space flights in 1969 and 1970, and he also won a Peabody Award for his work on NBC’s Second Sunday program. Other stories that Hackes covered included the assassination of Robert F. Kennedy, the funeral of President John F. Kennedy, the Watergate scandal and the attempted assassination of President Ronald Reagan. Hackes also helped to write, edit and produce stories each day on NBC’s syndicated “A-News” television program, which provided Washington stories to NBC’s 200 affiliated TV stations.

After voluntarily taking an early retirement from NBC in April 1986, Hackes became the radio voice of the AARP. He hosted a daily radio program for retired Americans called Mature Focus, which aired on 600 radio stations nationwide. Hackes also consulted to the National Weather Service and to the U.S. Department of the Army regarding various information programs. He also did voice-overs for corporate videotapes and moderated teleconferences for organizations like the Internal Revenue Service.

== Acting ==
After retiring from NBC, Hackes had acting roles in two prominent films. In 1987, Hackes played heartless network executive Paul Moore in the film Broadcast News, who oversaw an extensive layoff and restructuring of news personnel in a TV network’s Washington bureau. "I went down to see if I could get a walk-on part (in the film), just for fun," Hackes told the Los Angeles Times. "It could be a one-picture career for me." Hackes told the Times that while no network news presidents praised or criticized his performance, NBC News president Larry Grossman told him, "Now you know what we have to go through."

Hackes also had a small role in the 1991 film True Colors.

== Death ==
Hackes died on April 17, 1994, at Georgetown University Hospital, after suffering a heart attack. He was buried in Arlington National Cemetery.

== Filmography ==
Year	Title	Role	Notes
1987	Broadcast News	Paul Moore	
1991	True Colors	Dr. Burt Tuck	(final film role)
