= Bill Ryan (journalist) =

American television correspondent and news analyst

Bill Ryan (right, with Frank McGee) at the NBC newsroom in New York on November 22, 1963

William Emmett "Bill" Ryan III (April 4, 1926 – February 18, 1997) was an American broadcast journalist with the NBC television network and its owned-and-operated local station WNBC-TV in New York City for 26 years. He served for a year (1970-1971) as news anchor at WOR-TV. Ryan was also co-anchor of the Ralph & Ryan radio morning show on WMCA from 1981 to 1985.

Ryan may be best remembered for co-anchoring NBC's coverage of the assassination of U.S. President John F. Kennedy with Chet Huntley and Frank McGee.
