= Scripps Ranch, San Diego =

- Community of San Diego
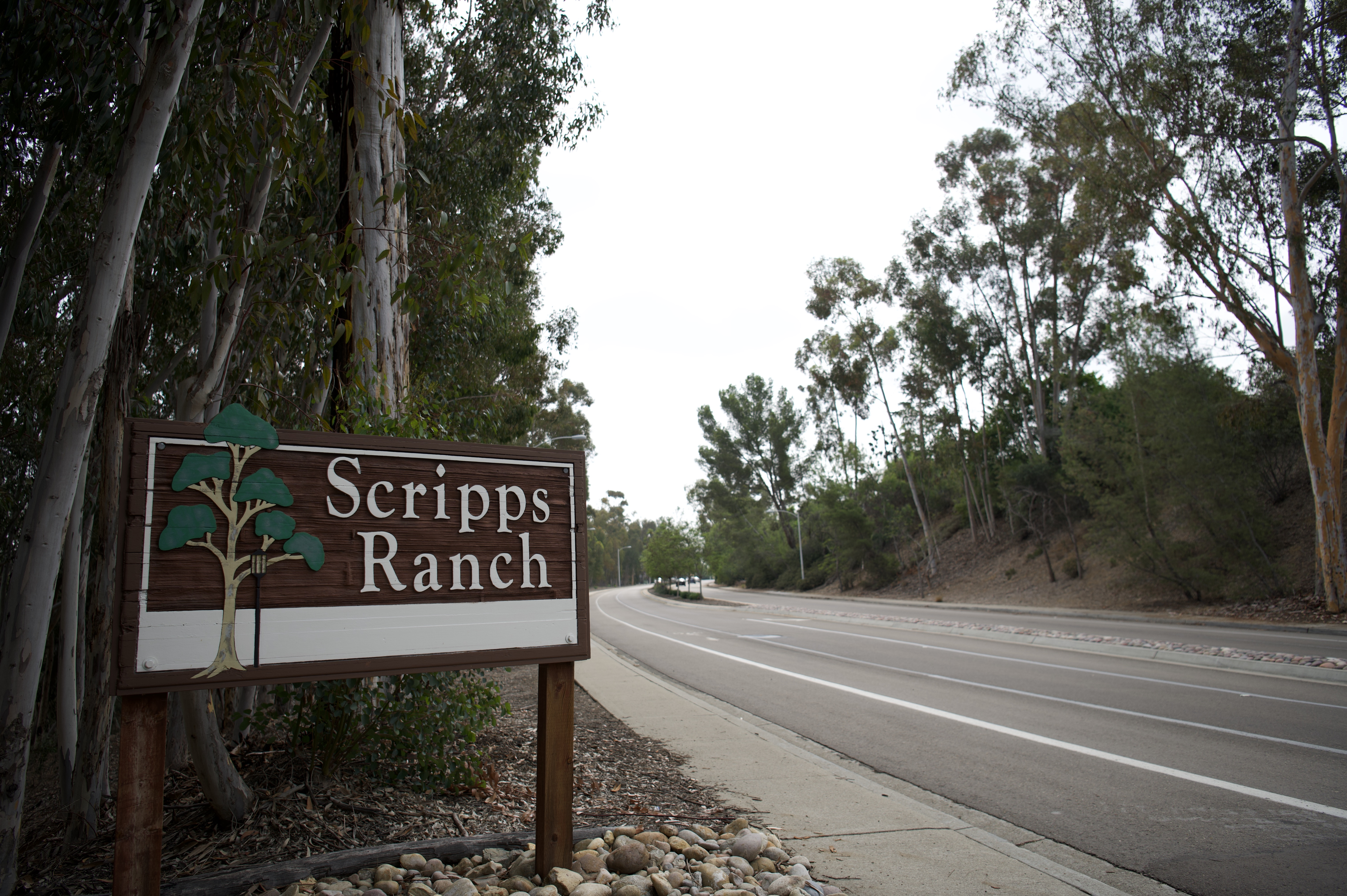
- A neighborhood sign on Scripps Ranch Blvd.

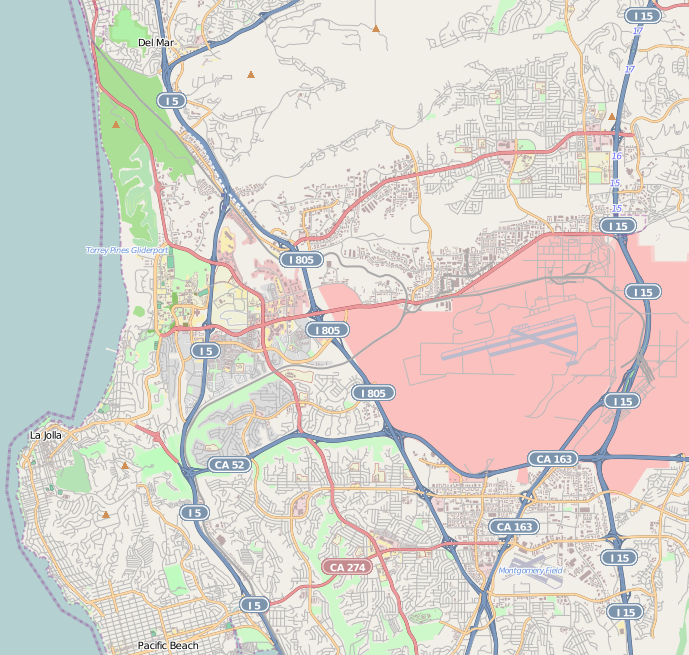
- Location within Northwestern San Diego
- Coordinates: 32.9022691°N 117.0997546°W
- Country: United States
- State: California
- County: San Diego
- City: San Diego

Scripps Ranch is a community of San Diego, California, in the northeastern part of the city. It is located east of Interstate 15, north of Marine Corps Air Station Miramar, and west of Poway. Its ZIP Code is 92131.

Scripps Ranch is an inland bedroom community within the city of San Diego. Miramar Reservoir is located within Scripps Ranch and offers recreational boating and fishing. A feature of Scripps Ranch is its landscaping, which includes mature eucalyptus trees that are most apparent along Pomerado Road.

== History ==
E.W. Scripps came to California in 1890 on a steamship to San Diego. He didn’t expect much but as he traveled north, he became more excited. Arriving at a barren, dry hill 16 miles from town, he decided to build a home and named it Miramar “after the Archduke Maximilian's castle in Trieste, Italy). He and his mentor-half-sister, Ellen Browning Scripps, bought 400 acres of what is today Scripps Ranch for $5,000; 30 acres were E.W.'s, for his home and grounds whereas the rest would belong to Ellen. Eventually he acquired 2,100 acres and built a home. He envisioned Miramar Ranch as both a winter retreat and a self-sufficient compound for the Scripps family. The grounds were covered with citrus, pine, eucalyptus, and other beautiful trees (some still stand at the Scripps Ranch Swim and Racquet Club). Ellen lived at Miramar until 1897 and E.W. until 1917.

By 1900, Miramar Ranch had become the Scripps family’s home base in California. What began as a part-time winter refuge evolved into a year-round residence – E.W. Scripps grew so fond of the ranch that he rarely left it for extended periods until 1917. Many Scripps family members also resided at Miramar over the years, including Ellen Browning Scripps, who lived there from 1891-1897.

In October 2003, a section of south Scripps Ranch was devastated by the Cedar Fire, destroying over 300 homes.

Two elected planning groups (the Scripps Ranch Planning Group and the Miramar Ranch North Planning Committee), advise the city on local planning and land-use issues.

== Demographics ==
The 2021 population estimate for Scripps Ranch is 36,307 people living in the neighborhood, an increase of 10.7% from 2010. The racial makeup of the neighborhood was 50.6% White, 28.34% Asian and Pacific Islander, 12.3% Hispanic, 1.9% African American, 0.3% from other races, and .07% American Indian. As of 2021, median household income was $154,601; 38% of the 13,301 households made $200,000 or more, while 71% made $100,000 or more and 5.5% made $29,999 or less.

== Education ==
The community is served by the San Diego City Schools.

=== Elementary schools ===
- Dingeman Elementary School
- E.B. Scripps Elementary School
- Jerabek Elementary School
- Miramar Ranch Elementary School

=== Middle schools ===
- Thurgood Marshall Middle School

=== High schools ===
- Scripps Ranch High School

=== Colleges and universities ===
- Alliant International University
- John Paul the Great Catholic University
- National University

== Media ==
- Scripps Ranch Civic Association Newsletter

== Notable residents ==
- Adam Brody, actor, former resident
- Brandon Call, actor, former resident
- Jacques Cesaire, defensive end, San Diego Chargers
- Drew Brees, quarterback, New Orleans Saints, former resident
- Chris Chambers, wide receiver, San Diego Chargers, former resident
- Stephen Cooper, linebacker, San Diego Chargers
- Terry Crews, actor, former resident
- Ben Leber, linebacker, Minnesota Vikings
- Shawne Merriman, All-Pro linebacker, San Diego Chargers, former resident
- Mary Murphy, choreographer; dance judge on reality competition show So You Think You Can Dance
- Gary Plummer, former linebacker, San Diego Chargers
- Samuel H. Scripps, philanthropist in theatre and dance, former resident
- Savannah Sellers,
- LaDainian Tomlinson, All-Pro running back, San Diego Chargers, former resident
- Jerry Trainor, actor, former resident
- Kellen Winslow, Hall of Fame former tight end, San Diego Chargers
- Kellen Winslow Jr., All-Pro tight end, Tampa Bay Buccaneers
- Kyle Mooney, actor, former resident
- Mike Scifres, former San Diego Chargers Punter
- Chad Ruhwedel, 2016/2017 Stanley Cup champion Pittsburgh Penguins defensemen, former resident
