= Stockton Helffrich =

American broadcaster and progressive activist

Stockton Helffrich (October 23, 1911 – February 2, 1997) was a progressive activist who worked for NBC for twenty-seven years, holding several positions such as: script reader, script division from 1934-1935; assistant manager and then manager in the script division and literary rights division from 1935-1942; manager of radio/television Continuity Acceptance Department, 1942-1955; and Director of Continuity Acceptance Department from 1955-1960.

== Early life ==
Stockton Helffrich lived in Jackson Heights, New York in a middle-class, registered-Republican family and was the youngest of four brothers. He paid his way through Penn State University and at the age of twenty-two graduated with his baccalaureate degree in English. Six months later, he began his professional career at NBC.

== Career with NBC ==
Helffrich was one of the first men to be chosen to wear the distinct NBC page uniform. He was a member of the first class of "The Long Blue Line." Early NBC page members were required to dress in a dark-blue, double-breasted uniform that had six brass buttons, gold braids worn on the right shoulder, epaulettes, circular gold markings at the base of the sleeve, and white flannel trousers. These original NBC page uniforms were based on the ones worn by the U.S. naval ensigns.

The 1930s were a progressive year for NBC Radio. It had just completed its first seven years and was moving its headquarters to Radio City. Helffrich transferred from the page staff to the more wanted tour-guide position not solely because of his height; NBC had more guide uniforms ready for long-limbed young men rather than short. There were worse activities a new college graduate could be doing in New York City during the Height of the Great Depression, and acting as a studio guide to a daily crowd of mostly female guests was an easy task for Helffrich. While working as a tour guide, Helffrich organized a committee to write an NBC manual on consideration, setting down specific standards of how to properly deal with the public. It was the first set of guidelines he would write during his time with the network but not his last. Helffrich later went on to help update the censorship rules for both NBC radio and television.

His initiative in organizing and composing this early guidebook brought him to the attention of corporate management. Within six months, Helffrich received a raise in pay and the title of script reader, joining the script division under NBC radio's Continuity Acceptance Department directed by Janet MacRorie and later Clarence L. Menser.

From 1948- 1960, sex in television programming became a fear of the general public. Helffrich, Chief censor of NBC-TV, said that he felt a conflict between providing emotional security about the difficult subject of sexuality and supplying information. In the late 1940s and early '50s, a wave of homophobia took place. During this time, Helffrich held a policy of "careful avoidance" of homoerotic themes. By the mid-'60s, America's gay lifestyle could no longer be hidden from television, and made its way onto the big screen. Censorship of the female body was another point of heated discussion that Helffrich had to face in the early '50s, pulling many different instances of female cleavage from television. This case was called the "NBC-TV's Cleavage Control".

And, as for male sexuality, in 1956 it was Helffrich who "decreed that when Elvis Presley appeared on The Steve Allen Show it would be only from the waist up."

As early as 1948, Helffrich wrote of his concern about violence portrayed on television, especially about the portrayal of sensitive topics such as killings and suicide. He felt the latter was highly suggestive to any viewer, and decided that the network's program department should avoid similar themes of suicide methods. In 1951, monitoring the content of programs with break-out stars such as Milton Berle and Sid Caesar, Helffrich pleaded with his colleagues to avoid making fun, even of stuttering, with the message: "Could you brief the talent on keeping away from jokes on personal affiliations."

Helffrich played a remarkable role for NBC-TV when it came to the area of race on early television. As head of the Continuity Acceptance Department, he ordered cuts from all Hollywood films and cartoons that held mocking stereotypes of African Americans. He banned any production that represented different races in any way known to be offensive. As well, he edited all racist songs from TV programs.

== Later life ==
Throughout his time with NBC, Helffrich grew into a progressive activist. After twenty-seven years at NBC-TV, Helffrich resigned in 1960 to take a position with the National Association of Broadcasters Code Authority office in New York City, which he held for twenty years. There, he acted as a super censor, heading up a clearinghouse that decided local and network standards and practices. He married Dolores Faerber, and had a son named Richard in 1942 and two daughters named Carla and Jackie Austin. Helffrich retired at age sixty-nine in 1980, and died on February 2, 1997.
