= NBC Studios (New York City) =

Television studio complex

Coordinates: 40.759°N 73.979°W

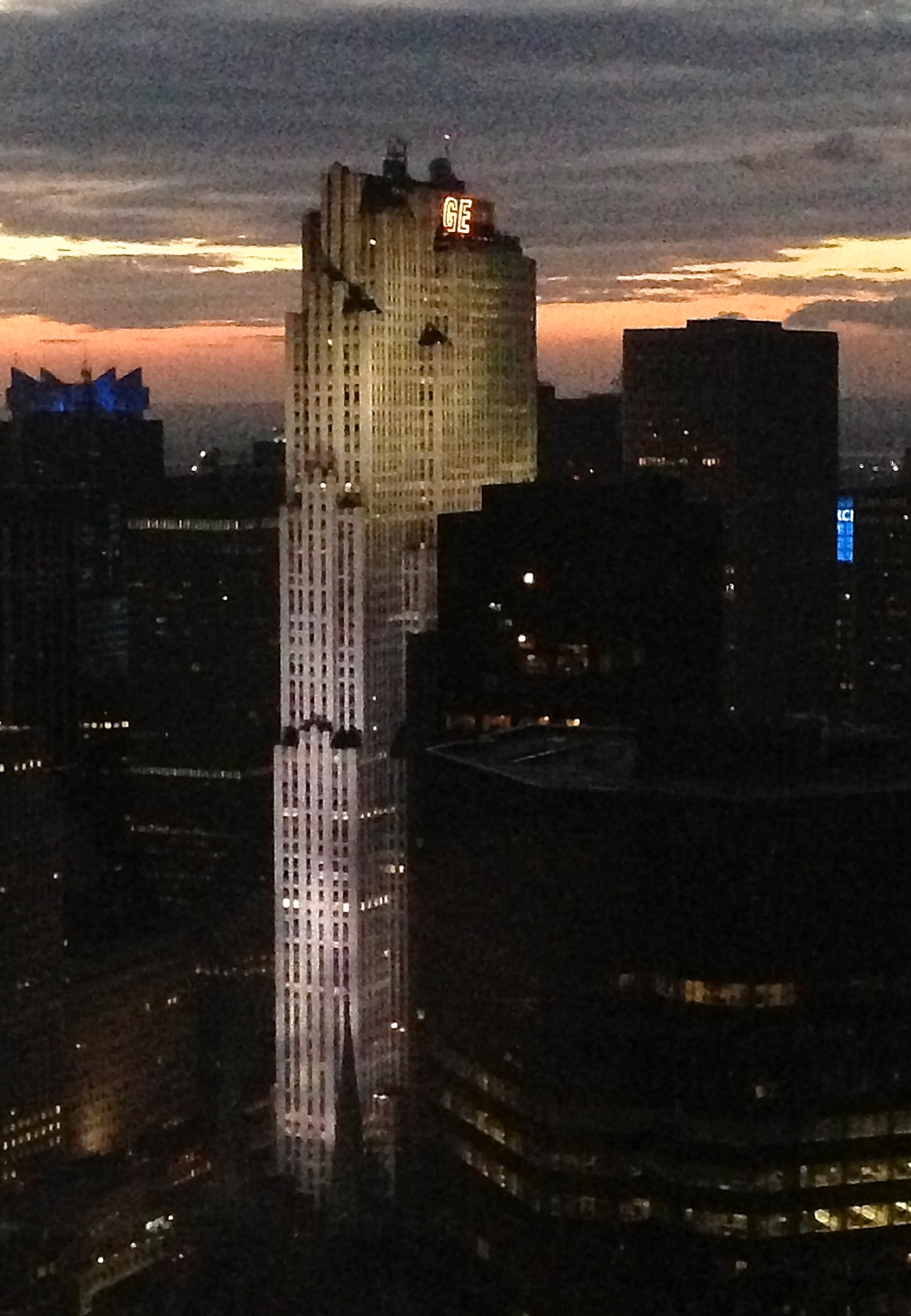
- 30 Rockefeller Plaza as seen from the Citigroup Center at dusk
- Former names: NBC Radio City Studios

General information
- Type: Television Studios Complex
- Location: New York City; United States
- Owner: NBCUniversal; (2004–present)

Design and construction
- Developer: Radio Corporation of America

NBC Studios are located in the historic 30 Rockefeller Plaza (on Sixth Avenue between 49th and 50th streets) in Manhattan, New York City. The building houses the NBC television network headquarters, its parent NBCUniversal, and NBC's flagship station WNBC (Channel 4), as well as Telemundo's flagship station WNJU.

The first NBC Radio City Studios began operating in the early 1930s. Tours of the studios began in 1933, suspended in 2014 and resumed on October 26, 2015. Because of the preponderance of radio studios, that section of the Rockefeller Center complex became known as Radio City (and gave its name to Radio City Music Hall).

== Current studio spaces ==
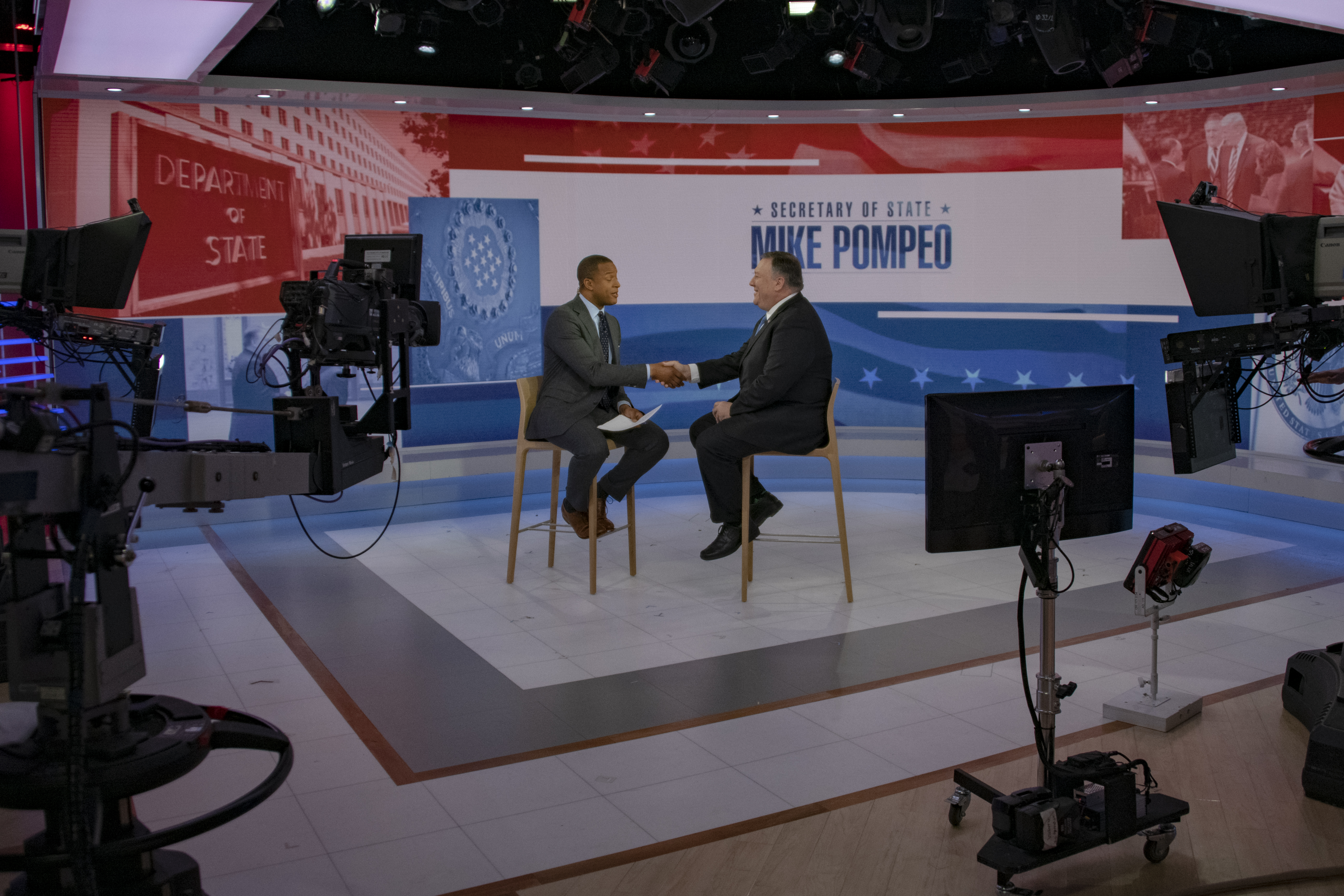
Today Studio 1A set in 2019

Studio 8H, which was originally built to host the NBC Symphony Orchestra, circa 1930s

Studio	Production	Notes	Floor	Size
1A	Today	Since 1994, the network's morning program is produced at a ground-level, windowed studio across 49th Street from 30 Rockefeller Plaza at 10 Rockefeller Plaza; it was previously broadcast from inside 30 Rock. Studio 1A is a multilevel studio; the upstairs portion contains a kitchen used for cooking segments. The studio was also used by WNBC's Live at Five, MSNBC's Countdown with Keith Olbermann, and NBC Nightly News for a short period during the decontamination of the broadcast's facilities and offices in October 2001 due to the 2001 anthrax attacks. After a minor renovation that started in mid-August 2021, Today debuted on September 7, 2021, with a new desk and flooring to Studio 1A. Nightly News moved to the studio on September 13, 2021. On June 2, 2025, following Tom Llamas's debut as Nightly News anchor, Top Story was moved to 1A. Nightly News and Llamas's NBC News Now show Top Story moved to 3A on May 18, 2026.	Ground floor	2,430 sq ft (226 m^{2})
3A	NBC Nightly News, NBC News Now	Formerly the main studio of MSNBC (now MS NOW). A new set debuted on September 20, 2021, highlighted by curved screens and a large, arch-like video wall. After MS NOW relocated to 229 West 43rd Street, NBC News announced in April 2026 that NBC News Now and the NBC Nightly News would move to 3A.	3rd floor	4,794 sq ft (445.4 m^{2})
3B East	WNBC	Studio 3B was the former home of the Huntley-Brinkley Report, the NBC daytime serial The Doctors, Today, Dateline NBC, NBC Nightly News, and coverage of the 2008 presidential election. Since Nightly left the space in 2017, 3B would be used for pre-taped segments and interviews. At 4,060 sq ft (377 m^{2}), 3B was the last 30 Rock studio that had kept its original dimensions since the building's 1933 opening. In August 2022, NBC confirmed plans to divide the space equally into two studios for its New York stations' news operations. WNBC would move into 3B East on November 3, 2023; Telemundo station WNJU moved into 3B West on May 31, 2025.	3rd floor	2,030 sq ft (189 m^{2})
3B West	WNJU		3rd Floor	2,030 sq ft (189 m^{2})
3C	vacant	Formerly the home of NBC Nightly News from November 8, 1999, to October 23, 2011; however the studio's size decreased significantly during the 2007 renovations which connected it with 3A. From April 21, 2012, until October 9, 2016, WNBC originated from this studio. Nightly News began using the space again in July 2017 following additional renovations that led to it being referred to as "3A West". Nightly News moved in with Today in Studio 1A in September 2021. 3C was formerly the main home for NBC News Now, including NBC News Daily, which both relocated to 3A	3rd floor	1,310 sq ft (122 m^{2})
3K	vacant	3K was formed by combining former radio studio 3F and studio 3H. 3H was the first studio in the building to be converted for television production, being converted in 1935 and serving as NBC Television's lone studio until the conversion of Studio 8G in 1948. The former home of NBC Nightly News, NBC Sports, Today, The Ed Show, The Howdy Doody Show, NBC News at Sunrise, The Gabby Hayes Show, Early Today, All in with Chris Hayes, The Last Word with Lawrence O'Donnell, Dateline NBC, and from October 9, 2016, until November 2, 2023, WNBC's News 4 New York.	3rd floor	2,668 sq ft (247.9 m^{2})
4E	Dateline NBC, Early Today	A new newsroom and studio for MSNBC, built in early 2016, is located in the northeast corner of the building, with windows overlooking West 50th St and Rockefeller Plaza. The glassed-in studio in the corner is designated Studio 4E, shows also originated from the various locations in the newsroom area, which connects to the 3rd and 5th floors via a stairway.	4th floor	
6A	vacant	The 6th and 7th floors of the studio building were left unfinished when NBC first occupied the space in 1933, and Studios 6A and 6B were not built until November 1941. Former home of Twenty-One, Say When!!, The Tomorrow Show, The David Letterman Show, Late Night with David Letterman, Late Night with Conan O'Brien, The Dr. Oz Show, 6A was the first 30 Rock studio to be converted for high-definition television. In August 2013, Late Night with Jimmy Fallon moved into this space while Studio 6B underwent renovations for The Tonight Show Starring Jimmy Fallon. From September 2014 to May 2016, Meredith Vieira's daytime talk show, The Meredith Vieira Show, originated from this studio as well. In the summer of 2016, Maya & Marty, a variety show that featured Maya Rudolph and Martin Short also originated from this studio. Megyn Kelly Today then occupied the space from 2017 to 2018. After its cancellation, the set and studio were redressed for various NBC, NBC News, and MSNBC specials. From July 13, 2020, to March 19, 2021, The Tonight Show filmed in 6A without an audience due to the COVID-19 pandemic, before returning to Studio 6B. The Kelly Clarkson Show relocated to Studio 6A from the Universal Studios Lot in Los Angeles, beginning with the 2023–24 season.	6th floor	3,504 sq ft (325.5 m^{2})
6B	The Tonight Show Starring Jimmy Fallon	The former home of Broadway Open House, Bob Hope's radio program, the television version of Texaco Star Theater, The Ernie Kovacs Show, Tonight Starring Ernie Kovacs Tic Tac Dough, Tonight Starring Jack Paar, Play Your Hunch, The Tonight Show Starring Johnny Carson, NBC Nightly News, The Bell Telephone Hour, Late Night with Jimmy Fallon and the former studio for flagship station WNBC. Fallon returned to the studio on March 22, 2021.	6th floor	3,690 sq ft (343 m^{2})
6E	Global Media Insert studio	Consists of four small spaces. Former home of Early Today and MSNBC's secondary studio. This space was previously a portion of WNBC's Master Control. From January 6 until March 13, 2020, it was used for E!'s E! News and Pop of the Morning.	6th floor	
8G	Late Night with Seth Meyers	A former radio studio converted for television use in 1948, it went on air on April 22 of that year. Former home of Today, The Phil Donahue Show, The Rosie O'Donnell Show, The Caroline Rhea Show, The Amber Ruffin Show, The Jane Pauley Show, and Football Night in America, as well as the original Concentration and Jeopardy! which recorded their color episodes on alternating days/weeks from 1964 to 1975. NBC Nightly News used this studio during the 2007 renovations of NBC News headquarters, except on some Sunday evenings where, due to football programming, the news was broadcast from Studio 1A. This studio has also been used for 2008 and 2010 election night coverage.	8th floor	2,280 sq ft (212 m^{2})
8H	Saturday Night Live	Studio 8H was, at the time of construction, the world's largest radio studio. It was converted to television use in 1950 (however, it had hosted television broadcasts prior to conversion, namely simulcasts of The Voice of Firestone). Former home of Kraft Television Theater and other live dramas, election night coverage, Last Call with Carson Daly, Later, and the NBC Symphony Orchestra under Arturo Toscanini. Used for offsite coverage of the 2008 Summer Olympics and for the "Live Show" and "Live from Studio 6H" episodes of 30 Rock. 8H was also the temporary home to Football Night in America during the 2013 NFL season. Has been home to SNL continuously since 1975.	8th floor	3,955 sq ft (367.4 m^{2})

== Shows produced at NBC Studios New York ==
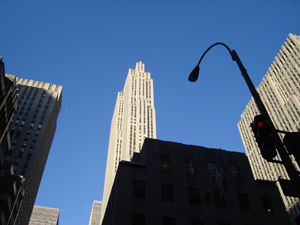
30 Rockefeller Plaza is the world headquarters of NBC.

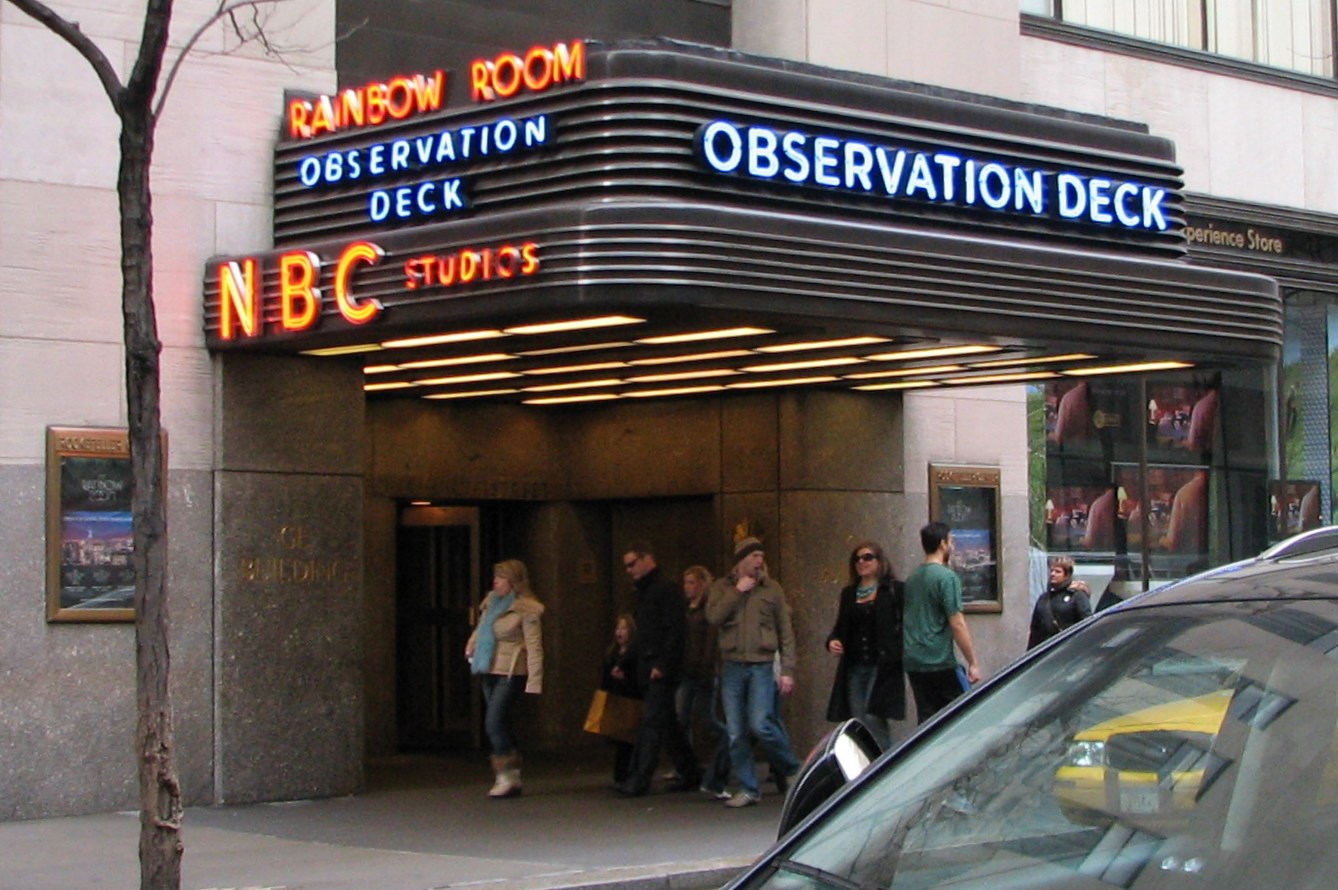
Ground-level entrance

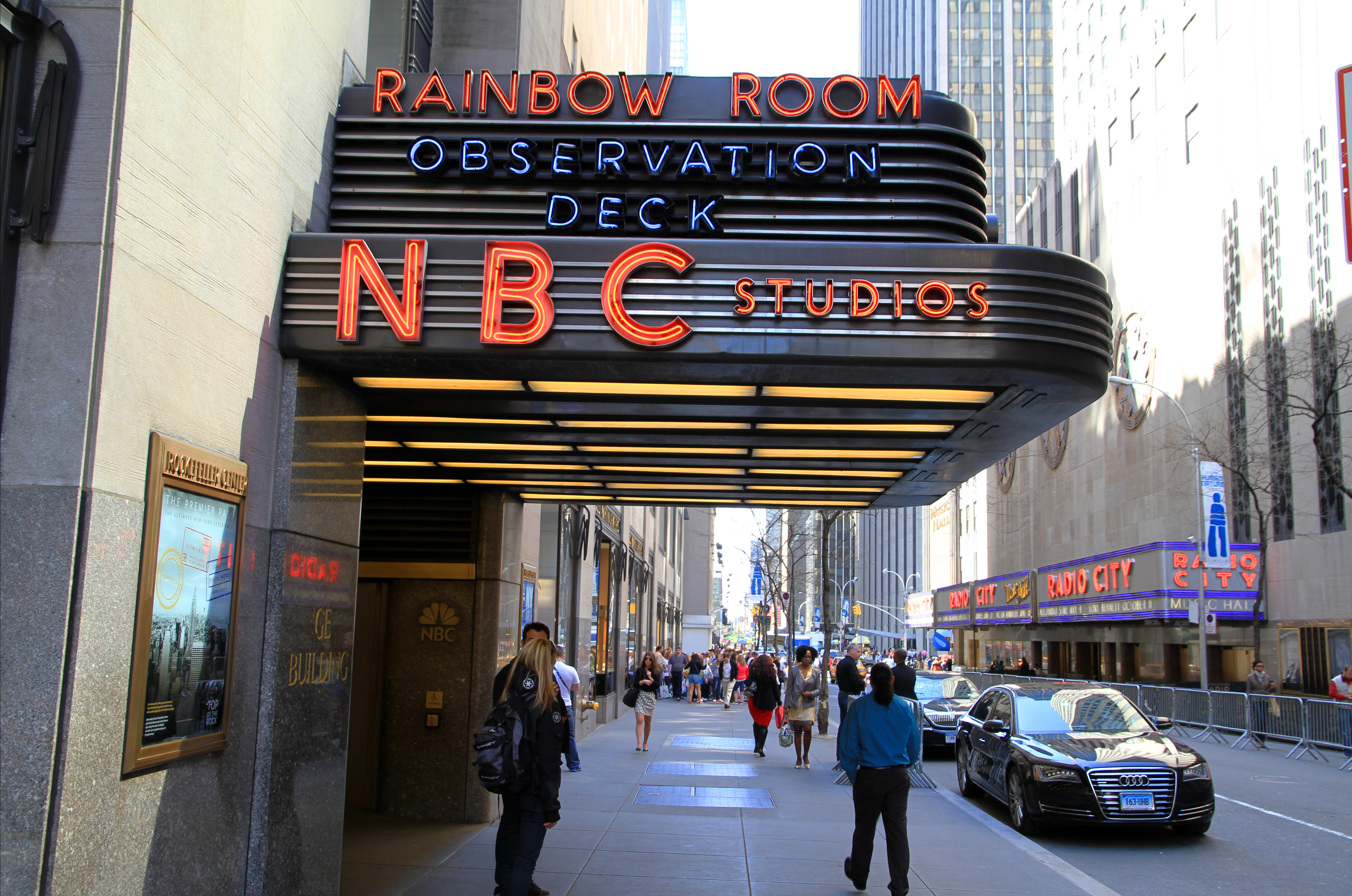
Marquee from the side

Among the shows originating at 30 Rockefeller Plaza (shows taping as of the 2023–2024 season in bold):

Program	Network/Station	Dates	Studio
The 11th Hour	MSNBC	2016–2025	3A
30 Rock	NBC	2010 and 2012	8H (Live episodes)
All in with Chris Hayes	MSNBC	2013–2025	3K, 4E, 6A, 3A
Ayman	MSNBC	2021–2025	3C
The Amber Ruffin Show	Peacock	2020–2022	8G
Call My Bluff	NBC	1965	6A
The Caroline Rhea Show	Syndication	2002–2003	8G
Charge Account/Jan Murray Show	NBC	1960–1962	6B
Concentration	NBC	1958–1973	3A, 6A, 8G
Countdown with Keith Olbermann	MSNBC	2007–2011	1A
The Crossover	NBC Sports Network	2013–2014	8G
The Cycle	MSNBC	2012–2015	3A, 3K
**Dateline NBC**	**NBC**	**1992–present**	3A, 3B, 3K, **4E**
The David Letterman Show	NBC	1980	6A
Deadline: White House	MSNBC	2017–2025	3A
The Doctors	NBC	1963–1982	3B, 3A
Dough Re Mi	NBC	1958–1960	6A
Dr. Nancy	MSNBC	2009	3A
The Dr. Oz Show	Syndication	2009–2012	6A
E! News	E!	2020	6E
**Early Today**	**NBC**	**2007–present**	3K, 6E, **4E**
The Ed Show	MSNBC	2009–2015	3K, 3A
Eye Guess	NBC	1966–1969	6A
Football Night in America	NBC	2006–2014	8G, 8H
He Said, She Said	Syndication	1969–1970	8H
House Party with Steve Doocy	Syndication	1990	6A
How to Survive a Marriage	NBC	1974–1975	8G
Howdy Doody	NBC	1947–1960	3A, 3H, 3K, 8G
Huntley-Brinkley Report	NBC	1956–1970	6B, 5HN, 8G
Jackpot	NBC	1974–1975	8G
The Jane Pauley Show	Syndication	2004–2005	8G
Jeopardy!	NBC	1964–1975	8G
The Kids Tonight Show	Peacock	2021	6A
Last Call with Carson Daly	NBC	2002–2005	8H
The Last Word with Lawrence O'Donnell	MSNBC	2010–2025	3K, 4E, 3C
Late Night (David Letterman and Conan O'Brien)	NBC	1982–2009	6A
Late Night with Jimmy Fallon	NBC	2009–2014	6B, 6A
**Late Night with Seth Meyers**	**NBC**	**2014–present**	**8G**
Later with Bob Costas	NBC	1988–1994	8H
Live at Five	WNBC	1980–2007	6B
The Match Game	NBC	1962–1969	8H
Maya & Marty	NBC	2016	6A
Megyn Kelly Today	NBC	2017–2018	6A
The Meredith Vieira Show	Syndication	2014–2016	6A
Missing Links	NBC	1963–1964	6A
Morning Joe	MSNBC	2007–2025	3A
Morning Meeting with Dylan Ratigan	MSNBC	2009	3A
**Morning News Now**	**NBC News Now**	**2020–present**	3C, **3A**
MSNBC Reports (Formerly MSNBC Live)	MSNBC	2007–2025	3A, 4E
**NBC News Daily**	**NBC, NBC News Now**	**2022–present**	3C, **3A**
NBC News at Sunrise	NBC	1983–1999	3K
**NBC Nightly News**	**NBC**	**1970–present**	8G, 3K, 3B, 3C, 1A, **3A**
NBC Sports studio shows	NBC	1947–2014	6A, 3K, 8G
**News 4 New York**	**WNBC**	**1941–present**	**3B**, 6B, 7E, 3C, 3K
PDQ (New York shows)	Syndication	1965–1969	8G
Personality	NBC	1967–1969	6A
The Phil Donahue Show	Syndication	1985–1996	8G
Play Your Hunch	NBC	1959–1963	6B
Pop of the Morning	E!	2020	6E
The Rachel Maddow Show	MSNBC	2008–2025	3A
Reach for the Stars	NBC	1967	6A
Rock Center with Brian Williams	NBC	2011–2013	3B
The Rosie O'Donnell Show	Syndication	1996–2002	8G
Sale of the Century	NBC, Syndication	1969–1974	8H
**Saturday Night Live**	**NBC**	**1975–present**	**8H**
Say When!!	NBC	1961–1965	6A
Shoot for the Stars	NBC	1977	6A
Split Personality	NBC	1959–1960	6A
That Was the Week That Was	NBC	1963–1965	6A, 8H (live)
Three on a Match	NBC	1971-1974	6A
Tic Tac Dough	NBC	1956–1959	8G, 6B
To Tell the Truth	Syndication	1971–1978; 1980–1981	8G, 8H, 6A
**Today**	**NBC**	**1952–present**	3K, 8G, 6A, 3B, **1A**
The Tonight Show (Jack Paar and Johnny Carson)	NBC	1957–1972	6B
**The Tonight Show Starring Jimmy Fallon**	**NBC**	**2014–present**	**6B**, 6A
**Top Story with Tom Llamas**	**NBC News Now**	**2021–present**	4E, 3C, 1A, **3A**
Treasure Hunt	NBC	1957–1959	8G
Twenty-One	NBC	1956–1958	6A, 6B
Up	MSNBC	2011–2013	3A
Verdict with Dan Abrams	MSNBC	2007–2008	3A
Way Too Early	MSNBC	2009–2016	3A
The Weekend Primetime	MSNBC	2025	3A
What's My Line?	Syndication	1971–1975	6A
The Who, What, or Where Game	NBC	1969–1974	6A, 8H
Word for Word	NBC	1963–1964	6A
You're Putting Me On	NBC	1969	6A

== Other locations ==
Some other New York originated programs are/were produced elsewhere in the area, including:

- Ambassador Theatre, 215 West 49th Street. The theater returned to Broadway use in 1956.
- Brooklyn Studios, 1268 East 14th Street in Midwood, Brooklyn. Included two studios, used as the filming location of many 1950s color "Spectaculars" such as The Esther Williams Aqua Special, Peter Pan; it is also where The Perry Como Show (1955), Mitch Miller Show (1960s), The Sammy Davis Jr. Show (1960s), Hullabaloo (1965–1966), Kraft Music Hall, Tic Tac Dough (nighttime), The Cosby Show, and Another World were produced. It was the home of CBS's soap opera As the World Turns until the series ceased production in 2010. The studio was equipped for color production when it opened in 1954. In 2000, the facility was sold to JC Studios, which closed in 2014. In June 2015, the building was sold and converted to office and self storage spaces.
- Center Theatre, 1236 Sixth Avenue. Productions included Texaco Star Theater with Milton Berle, Your Show of Shows (1950–1954), Voice of Firestone). The theater was demolished in 1954 for an addition to 1230 Avenue of the Americas.
- Century Theater, 932 Seventh Avenue at West 58th Street. Productions included Caesar's Hour with Sid Caesar (1954–1957), Mister Peepers, Treasure Hunt). Leased to Videotape Productions of New York 1958–1961. Demolished in 1962 for construction of an apartment building.
- Colonial Theater, 1887 Broadway at West 62nd Street. It was the taping location of the original version of The Price Is Right hosted by Bill Cullen, 1953–1963, and Colgate Comedy Hour. The studio was the first equipped for color production and originated the first color telecast on November 3, 1953. Demolished in 1977.
- Florida Showcase, second street-front location for The Today Show, 1962-1965.
- Grumman Studios, Bethpage, New York. Located in the former Grumman Aircraft plant on Long Island. Since 2012, used by NBC for live musicals each December, including The Sound of Music Live, Peter Pan Live, and The Wiz Live.
- Hudson Theatre, 141 West 44th Street. The original home of Tonight hosted by Steve Allen (1954–1957)). The theater still stands as part of the Millennium Times Square New York hotel and returned to Broadway use in 2017.
- International Theater, 5 Columbus Circle. The site of shows such as Admiral Broadway Review (1949), it was demolished in 1954 for the New York Coliseum. The Time Warner Center is now on the site.
- New Amsterdam Roof Garden Theater, 214 West 42nd Street, converted in 1930. The rooftop theater is abandoned, but the main auditorium is used as a Broadway theater.
- RCA Exhibition Hall. Original home of The Today Show, 1952-1958.
- Ziegfeld Theatre, 1341 Sixth Avenue at West 54th Street. Shows included The Perry Como Show (from 1956), Concentration (primetime 1961)). It was demolished in 1966 for a 49-story office tower.
- 67th Street Studios, 101 West 67th Street. The Knickerbocker Beer Show aka The Steve Allen Show on WNBT-TV (1953-1954), the direct predecessor to Tonight Starring Steve Allen, originated from here. Also the site of The Home Show with Arlene Francis (1954-1957) and the primetime version of Concentration (1958). Built in 1949 as "9 Television Square" for WOR-TV, it was leased to NBC from 1953 to 1963. Between 1961 and 1968, it became the Videotape Center, owned by independent production company Videotape Productions of New York. The Reeves Lincoln Square Studios took over the space from 1968 to 1970. In 1970, it became ABC's Studios 18 and 19, the production facility for soap opera All My Children, and One Life to Live, until 1990. The building was demolished in 1995, and the site is now the 50-story Millennium Tower apartment building.
- Uptown Studios (now Metropolis Studios), 105 East 106th Street at Park Avenue. The first episode of Howdy Doody in 1947 originated here.
- NBC Universal Network Organization Center, 900 Sylvan Avenue (Route 9W), Englewood Cliffs, New Jersey, home of CNBC and CNBC World.
- WNJU facility in Fort Lee, New Jersey; home of both Telemundo flagship WNJU and WNBC's New Jersey bureau, and former home of CNBC.
- WNBC's New York Live formerly (LX: NY) was produced in Studio 51 at nearby 75 Rockefeller Plaza, then moved to Studio 3K.
