= Joe Fryer =

Joe Fryer may refer to:

- Joe Fryer (footballer), English footballer
- Joe Fryer (journalist), American journalist
