= Kate Snow =

American television journalist (born 1969)

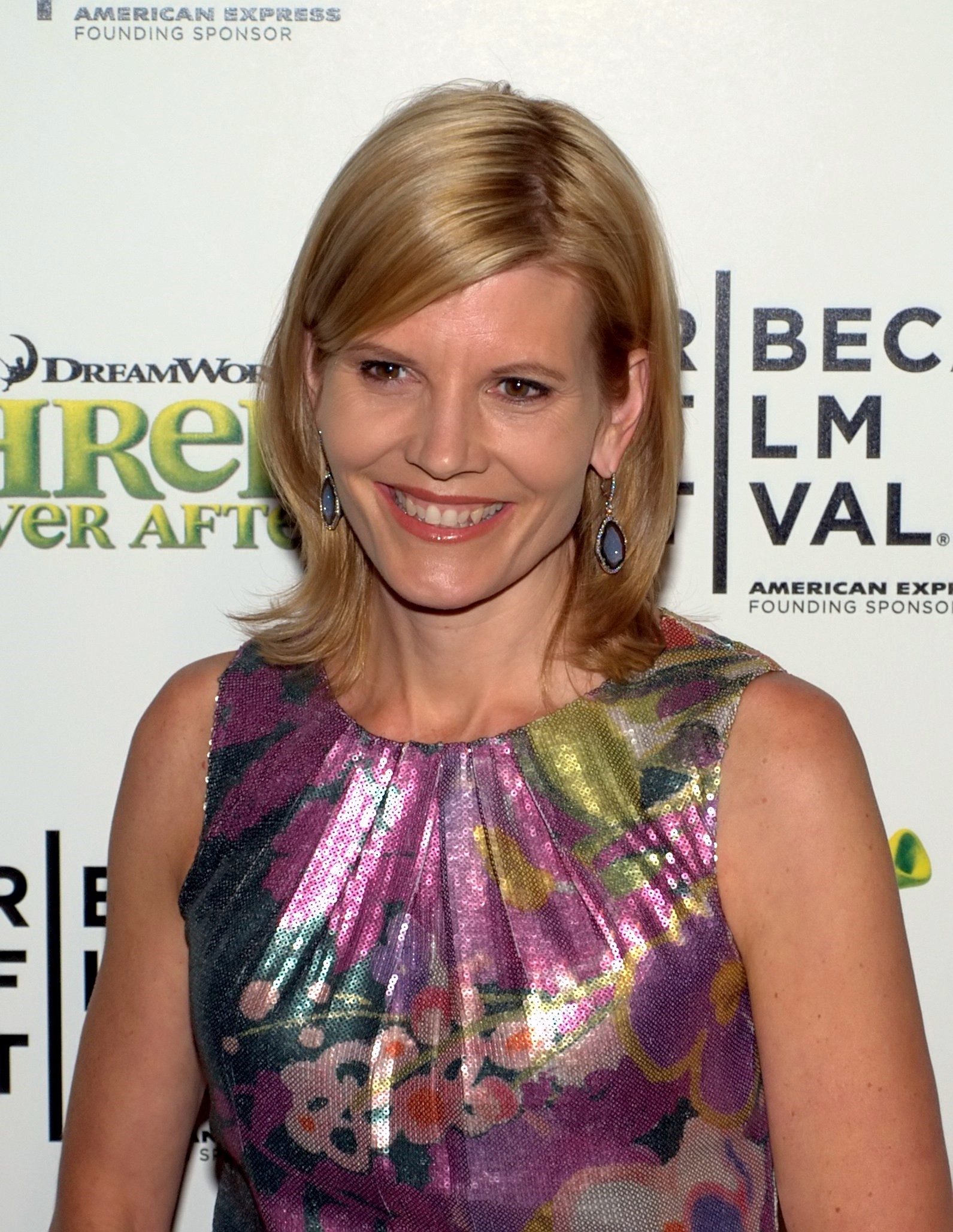
- Snow at the 2010 Tribeca Film Festival
- Born: June 10, 1969 (age 57); Bangor, Maine, U.S.
- Education: Cornell University (BS); Georgetown University (MSFS)
- Occupations: Journalist, News Anchor
- Employer(s): NBCUniversal, Comcast
- Television: Good Morning America; Dateline NBC; Rock Center with Brian Williams; NBC Nightly News; NBC News Daily
- Board member of: Big Brothers/Big Sisters of America
- Spouse: Chris Bro
- Children: 2
- Awards: News & Documentary Emmy Awards for Outstanding Live Coverage of a Current News Story – Long Form

Kate Snow (born June 10, 1969) is an American television journalist for NBC News, serving as Senior National Correspondent to various NBC platforms, including Today, NBC Nightly News and Dateline NBC. Snow also anchors NBC News Daily, and frequently substitutes for the weekday and weekend broadcast. Snow also previously hosted MSNBC Live and anchored the Sunday edition of NBC Nightly News.

Before joining NBC News in 2010, she was a co-anchor for the weekend edition of Good Morning America on ABC from 2004 to 2010. Snow had also appeared on its weekday edition and World News as a fill-in anchor and correspondent. She was also a correspondent for the now-canceled NBC newsmagazine Rock Center with Brian Williams.

== Early life and education ==
Snow was born June 10, 1969, in Bangor, Maine, and moved with her family to Burnt Hills, New York, when she was six months old. She is a daughter of Dean Snow. She is a 1987 graduate of Burnt Hills-Ballston Lake High School. She graduated from Cornell University, and holds a master's in foreign service from Georgetown University.

== Career ==
Snow joined ABC in 2003 as Good Morning America's White House reporter before she was tapped to co-host the morning show's weekend edition. She had previously worked at NPR and NBC Radio, and also worked as a reporter at KOAT-TV in Albuquerque, New Mexico, from 1995 to 1998 and at CNN from 1998 to 2003.

During the 2008 presidential race, Snow was ABC News' correspondent covering Hillary Clinton's presidential campaign, the 2004 Democratic National Convention, and Sarah Palin's campaign for vice president.

Snow joined NBC News in 2010 as correspondent for Dateline NBC and a contributor to other NBC programming. In September 2015, Snow began anchoring the Sunday broadcast of NBC Nightly News. That same month, Snow began hosting a two-hour block on MSNBC Live. One year later, she won a News & Documentary Emmy Awards for her interview of numerous women including Andrea Constand who had accused Bill Cosby of committing sexual assault, which had aired on Dateline NBC. In April 2017, she left her anchoring duties at MSNBC to become a Senior National Correspondent at NBC News, covering various stories for NBC Nightly News, Today and Dateline NBC.

In October 2019, Snow began hosting a true-crime television series titled Relentless, which airs on Oxygen. In September 2022, Snow began co-anchoring a two-hour block of NBC News Daily, alongside Aaron Gilchrist. The first hour of the program assumed the timeslot held by Days of Our Lives (which was moved to the streaming service Peacock) and will simulcast on NBC News Now and Peacock.

On February 18, 2024, Snow announced she will be anchoring her last Nightly News Sunday broadcast on February 25 to focus more on NBC News Daily.

=== Career timeline ===
- 1995–1998: KOAT-TV reporter
- 1998–2003: CNN reporter
- 2003–2010: ABC News
  - 2003–2004: Good Morning America White House correspondent
  - 2004–2010: Good Morning America Weekend Edition co-anchor
- 2010–present: NBC News
  - 2010–present: Dateline NBC correspondent
  - 2011–present: Today fill-in anchor and news anchor
  - 2011–2013: Rock Center with Brian Williams correspondent
  - 2013–present: NBC News national correspondent
  - 2015–2017: MSNBC Live anchor
  - 2015–2024: NBC Nightly News Sunday anchor
  - June 2017–July 2017: Sunday Night with Megyn Kelly correspondent
  - September 2022–present: NBC News Daily co-anchor

== Personal life ==
Snow is married to radio presenter Chris Bro. They have two children. Snow spoke on-air about her husband's difficult struggle with COVID-19 during the early months of the COVID pandemic in 2020.

On June 11, 2018, she shared the story of her father-in-law's suicide and the impact it had on her.

Snow is a member of the Department of Communication's advisory council at Cornell University and is on the national board of Big Brothers/Big Sisters of America.

In February 2023, Snow launched a digital EP cover album entitled Kate Snow.
