= Studio 8H =

Television studio in Manhattan, New York

Coordinates: 40.759000°N 73.979000°W

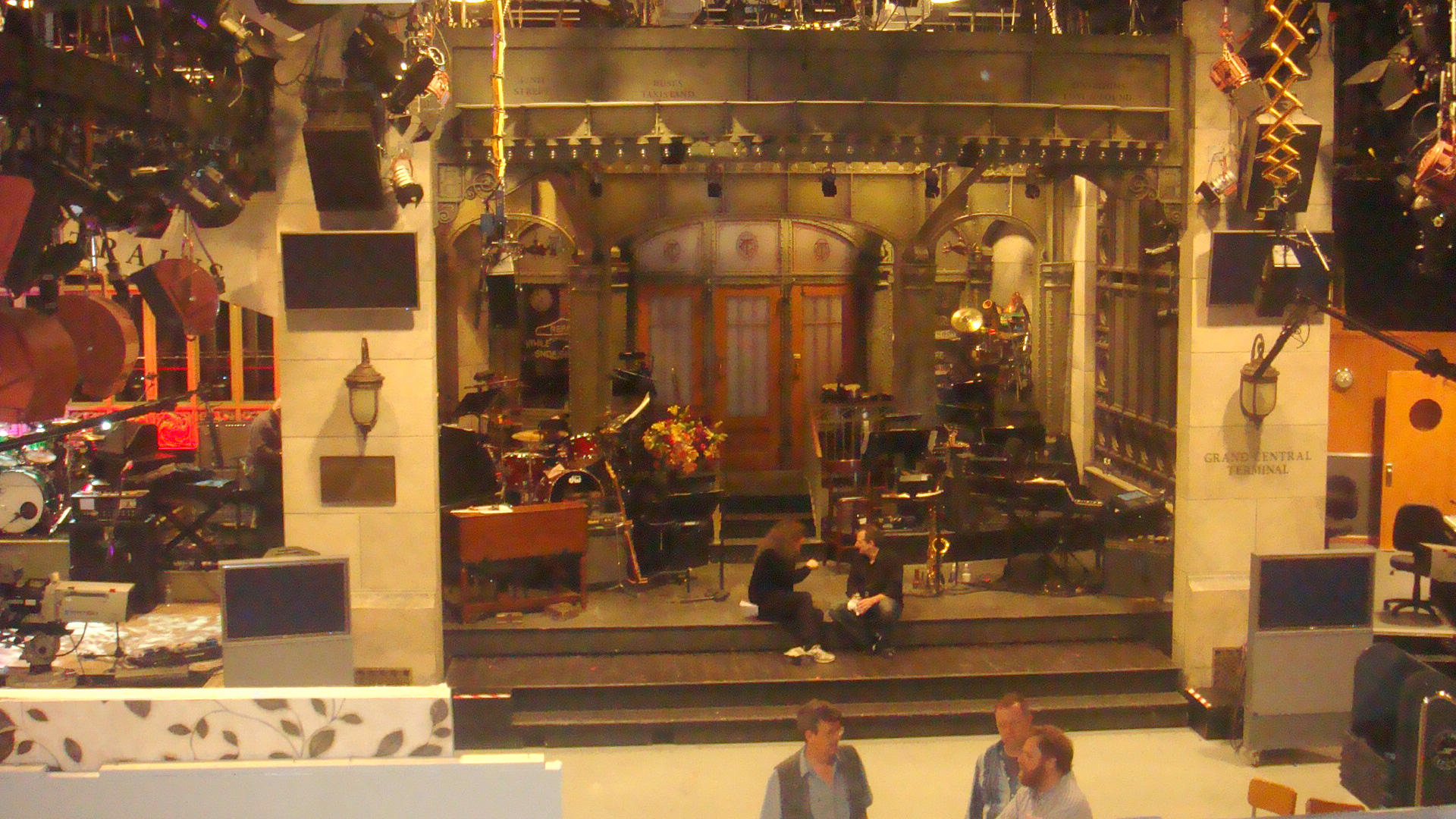
The set of Saturday Night Live in 8H

Studio 8H is a 6,102-square-foot (566.9 m^{2}) television studio located in Midtown Manhattan, New York City, United States. The studio is a part of NBC Studios, the home of the NBC television network, located at 30 Rockefeller Plaza. It is most notable for housing the live broadcast of Saturday Night Live (SNL), which has been broadcast from the studio since the show's inception in 1975.

== Construction ==
Studio 8H was built in 1933, at the time of Rockefeller Center's construction. It was intended not only for orchestral performances but also for radio variety programs with large studio audiences. It became the home of Arturo Toscanini's NBC Symphony Orchestra in 1937. At the time of construction, Studio 8H was the world's largest radio studio, 132 by 78 feet (40 m × 24 m) with a height of three stories, which could house a full orchestra. The first ever performance of Samuel Barber's Adagio for Strings was performed from Studio 8H. It was converted for television use in 1950, primarily for the live broadcast of Kraft Television Theatre.

== History ==
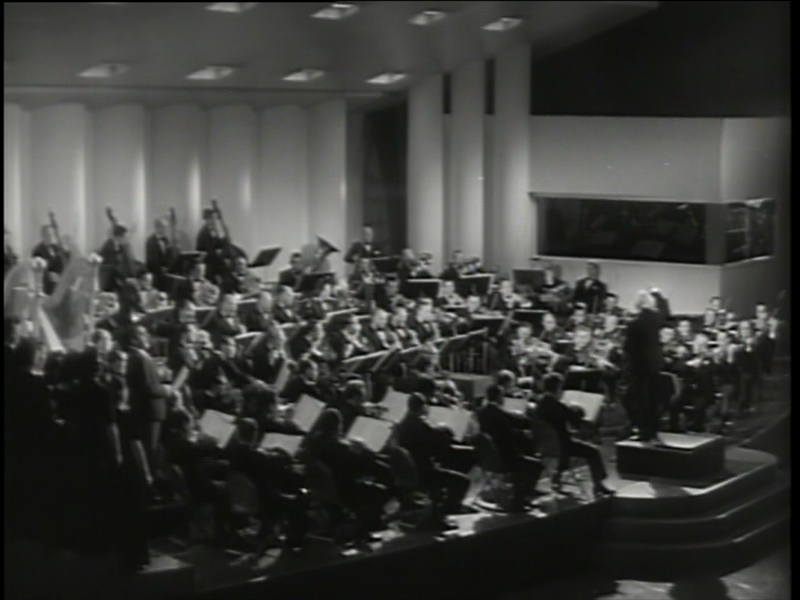
NBC Symphony Orchestra performing in 8H (still from a 1944 film)

Studio 8H is now most prominent for housing the NBC sketch comedy show Saturday Night Live, which is broadcast live. It was revamped just before the 1975 premiere of SNL at a cost of $250,000. Two episodes of NBC sitcom 30 Rock, "Live Show" and "Live from Studio 6H" were also broadcast live from the studio, a departure from the show's usual film format.

The first season finale of The Apprentice and the fifth anniversary special of Late Night with Conan O'Brien both used the studio for one night each. Likewise, Later with Bob Costas, Love, Sidney, the 50th anniversary television episode of Today in 1990, House Party with Steve Doocy, and the fifth anniversary special of Late Night with David Letterman were broadcast from Studio 8H. Last Call with Carson Daly used the studio until 2005, when the show moved to Studio 9 at the NBC Studios in Burbank, California.

The show Your Hit Parade filmed in 8H, where Fred Rogers worked writing music for the program. Years later, Eddie Murphy performed a parody of Mr. Rogers' children’s show character named "Mr. Robinson" on Saturday Night Live in Studio 8H.

In January 1975, a special one-hour episode of the daytime drama The Doctors was taped in Studio 8H. It was usually taped in Studio 3B.

In mid‐1990, Today relocated its set from Studio 3B to Studio 8H, to allow for construction of a new set that debuted in Studio 3B on September 10, 1990.

In May 2002, NBC celebrated its 75th anniversary and used 8H to shoot the live broadcast of the event. Lorne Michaels (executive producer of 8H mainstay Saturday Night Live) executive produced the event. The studio was also used for the live parts of the season finale of The Celebrity Apprentice on March 27, 2008.

MSNBC's Morning Joe news program celebrated its tenth anniversary with a show before a live audience at the studio on September 19, 2017. The studio was also used for the show's post-election coverage on November 7, 2018 as well as November 10, 2016 and November 7, 2012.
