= Vicky Nguyen =

American television journalist (born c. 1978)

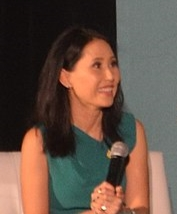
- Nguyen in 2021
- Born: Nguyễn Đỗ Quỳnh Yến c. 1979 (age 46–47); Ho Chi Minh City, Vietnam
- Education: Degree in communications (minor in biology)
- Alma mater: University of San Francisco
- Occupation: Investigative reporter
- Years active: 2000–present
- Television: NBC News; Investigative and Consumer Correspondent (2019–present); KNTV NBC Bay Area; Investigative Reporter: NBC Bay Area Investigative Unit (2007–2019); KSAZ Fox 10 News Phoenix (2004–2007); KOLO ABC Reno affiliate Central Florida News 13
- Children: 3
- Website: vickynguyen.com

Vicky Nguyen (born c. 1978) is a Vietnamese-born American investigative journalist working with NBC News in New York City. Nguyen joined NBC News in April 2019 as the Investigative and Consumer correspondent. Her reporting has been seen on The Today Show, 3rd Hour Today, Nightly News with Lester Holt, NBC News Now and MSNBC.

Prior to moving to New York, Nguyen worked for KNTV, the NBC owned-and-operated station in the San Francisco Bay Area. There, she served as a senior investigative reporter for the NBC Bay Area Investigative Unit and anchor of the Sunday evening news on NBC Bay Area. Before joining NBC Bay Area, Nguyen worked at various television stations in Florida, Nevada and Arizona.

== Early life and education ==
Nguyen was born in Saigon, Vietnam. At a very young age, she and her parents fled Vietnam as refugees. After two days, two nights and a Thai pirate attack on the open ocean, their boat landed on the coast of Malaysia, where Nguyen and her family stayed in a refugee camp for 10 months. Nguyen immigrated to the United States in 1980. A family in Eugene, Oregon sponsored her family to America. She spent most of her childhood in San Jose and Santa Rosa, and became a U.S. citizen at age 10. She went to elementary school at Santee Elementary in San Jose. Nguyen went on to attend college at the University of San Francisco on an academic scholarship. During her time at the university, Nguyen was a member of the cheer squad and served as president of her student body. In 2000, she graduated as valedictorian of her class with a degree in communications and a minor in biology.

== Professional career ==
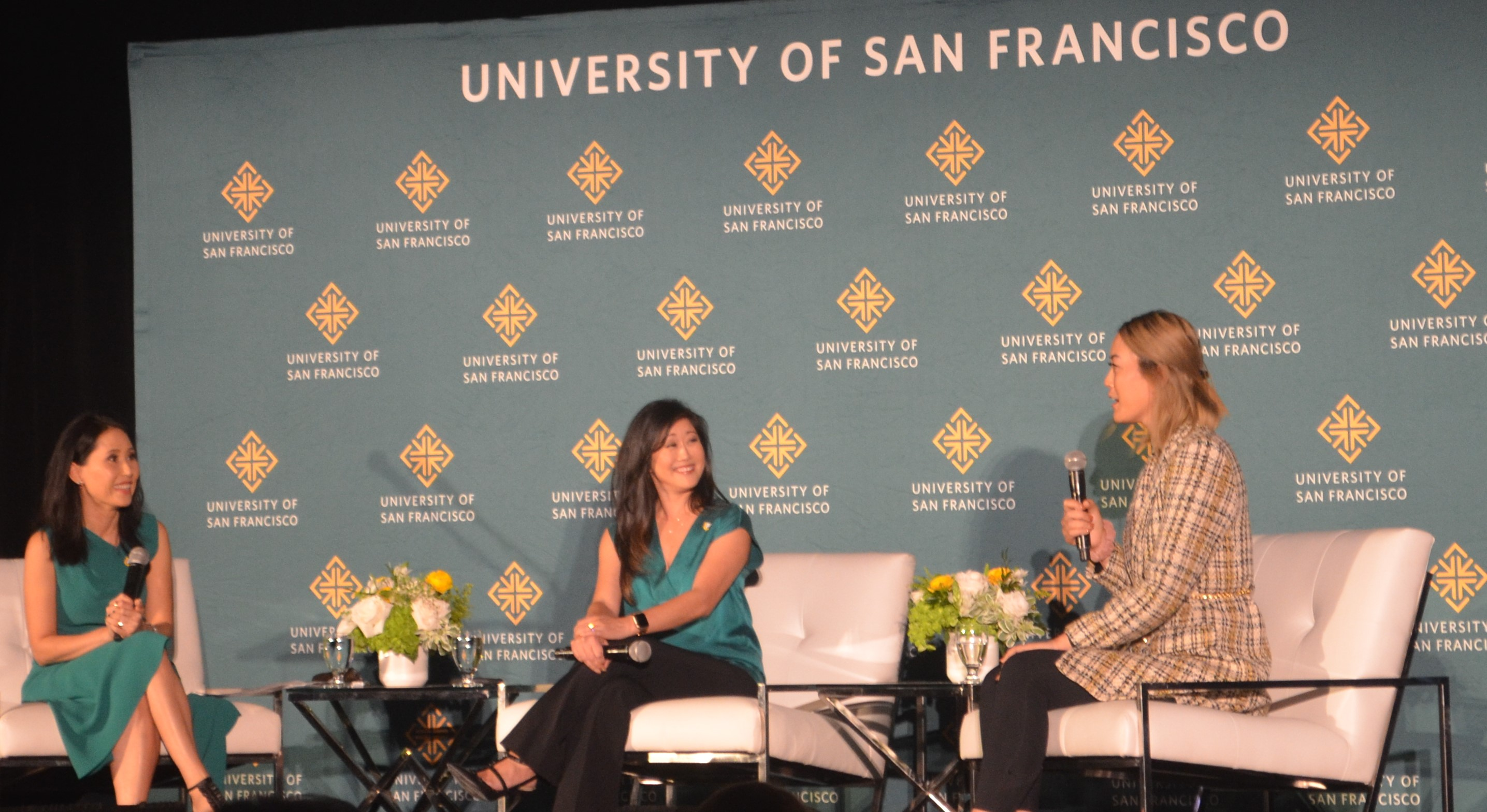
Nguyen (left) at the Silk Speaker Series event with figure skater Kristi Yamaguchi (center) and golfer Michelle Wie, at the University of San Francisco (2021)

Nguyen started her career with Central Florida News 13 in Orlando, Florida. While there, she shot, wrote and edited her stories before delivering live reports. She wrote on her blog, "I was a 'one man band.' I shot my own video on a 20 pound DVC Pro camera (and) carried my own 15 pound tripod." She then moved to ABC affiliate KOLO in Reno, Nevada as a nightside reporter and fill-in anchor.

Following her time in Reno, Nguyen moved to Phoenix, Arizona to work with KSAZ. At KSAZ, she covered national stories. Her interviews included Alex Trebek, Tyra Banks, Shaquille O'Neal and Senator John McCain. Nguyen also had the opportunity to cover the Baseline Killer and Serial Shooter investigations while with KSAZ, which was the first instance in which two separate serial killers attacked the same city at the same time.

=== NBC ===
Nguyen returned to Northern California in January 2007 and joined KNTV as a freelance reporter. Shortly thereafter she was hired full-time and worked as a special assignment reporter for NBC 11 News. Nguyen was promoted in March 2009 to anchor/senior investigative reporter at KNTV where she worked closely with KNTV's investigative unit.

In April 2019, Nguyen moved from California to New York City to accept a new role as an investigative and consumer correspondent for NBC News. Since joining NBC News, she has been on The Today Show, 3rd Hour Today, NBC Nightly News, and MSNBC. She also co-anchors NBC News Daily.

== Awards ==
Nguyen was honored with the 2019 Alfred I. duPont-Columbia University Award for "Drivers Under Siege" about the rise in violent attacks on Bay Area bus operators. Her work has also been recognized with the Scripps Howard Award, the Gerald Loeb Award, the National Press Club's Society of Professional Journalists Sigma Delta Chi Award, three Gracie awards, two Clarion awards, 15 regional Emmy awards and three regional Murrow awards.

In addition, she has earned several awards from the Asian American Journalists Association (AAJA) and the Radio and Television News Directors Association (RTNDA).

- 2015 Scripps Howard Award – Jack R. Howard Award for Television/Cable In-Depth Local Coverage.
- 2015 Gerald Loeb Award – Video/Audio Winner.
- 2019 Alfred I. duPont-Columbia Award.
- 2020 New York Woman of Impact by Variety

== Personal life ==
Nguyen and her husband have three daughters. In 2025, she published her memoir Boat Baby, which shares her family’s journey from Vietnam to the United States and her experiences growing up as a Vietnamese American.

== Works ==
- Nguyen, Vicky (2025). Boat Baby: A Memoir. Simon & Schuster. ISBN 978-1668025567.
