= NBC News Now =

American streaming news channel

- Country: United States
- Broadcast area: Worldwide
- Network: NBC News
- Headquarters: 30 Rockefeller Plaza; New York, New York

Programming
- Language: English

Ownership
- Owner: NBCUniversal
- Parent: Comcast

History
- Launched: May 29, 2019; 7 years ago

Links
- Webcast: www.nbcnews.com/watch

Availability

Streaming media
- The Roku Channel: Channel 116
- Service(s): Google TV, Hulu + Live TV, LG Channels, Peacock, Pluto TV, Prime Video Live TV, Samsung TV Plus, Sling Freestream, Tigo Star (only in Central America), The Roku Channel, Tubi, Flow and Telecentro (only in Argentina), Vizio Watch Free+, Xumo Play, YouTube TV

NBC News Now (stylized as NBC News NOW_) is an American streaming video news channel operated by the NBC News division of NBCUniversal.

== History ==
The service was first announced on October 24, 2018, under the name NBC News Signal; the service would be distributed via NBC News digital platforms, as well as free ad-supported streaming television (FAST) services such as Xumo and Pluto TV. It was initially led by NBC News and MSNBC's then-senior vice president of special programming Rashida Jones.

The service was announced as focusing on "political and social issues in America", and soft launched with an evening show hosted by Simone Boyce, and 218: Race for the House—a special program hosted by MSNBC analyst Steve Kornacki to cover the lead-up to the 2018 midterm elections. NBC News Group SVP of digital Nick Ascheim explained that the service planned to target viewers "who are up-to-date on the headlines but are seeking a deeper understanding of the news of the moment." NBC News expected the service to launch a full lineup of news programming by mid-2019. NBC News would be the last of the Big Three networks' news divisions to launch a live streaming news channel, behind CBS News's CBS News 24/7 and ABC News's ABC News Live.

The service officially launched on May 29, 2019, as NBC News Now; the channel would broadcast from 3 to 11 pm. ET daily, carrying original programming (including hourly news briefs) that would draw upon the resources of other NBC News programming, as well as extended breaking news coverage. In July 2019, NBC News Now hired former WNYW and CNBC Europe reporter Alison Morris as its first full-time anchor.

In October 2020, after being delayed from April due to the COVID-19 pandemic, NBC News Now launched Morning News Now with Savannah Sellers and Joe Fryer; it was contrasted from NBC's Today and MSNBC's Morning Joe as being a "hard news"-oriented program. In April 2021, NBC News hired former WTVJ, WNBC, and ABC News personality Tom Llamas to anchor a new evening show, which premiered in September 2021 as Top Story. In July 2021, NBC News hired around 200 new employees, the majority of which supporting digital initiatives such as NBC News Now. Hallie Jackson also premiered a new program, Hallie Jackson Now, in November 2021.

On June 6, 2022, MSNBC's MTP Daily with Chuck Todd moved to NBC News Now as Meet the Press Now. In January 2023, Gadi Schwartz—who co-hosted NBC News's Snapchat show Stay Tuned—was announced as a new 8 p.m. anchor. On August 3, 2022, NBC News announced NBC News Daily, a new daytime news program that would air on both NBC News Now and the NBC broadcast network, replacing its long-running soap opera Days of Our Lives (which moved exclusively to NBCUniversal's streaming service Peacock) on the latter.

On June 4, 2023, Chuck Todd announced that he would depart as moderator of Meet the Press, being succeeded as the host of it and Meet the Press Now by Kristen Welker.

In March 2025, it was announced that Llamas would succeed Lester Holt as the anchor of the weekday edition of NBC Nightly News, while also continuing to anchor Top Story for NBC News Now.

On April 15, 2026, NBC News president of editorial Rebecca Blumenstein announced that senior business correspondent Christine Romans would become chief business correspondent for NBC News, and would be anchoring a new two-hour show from 10 a.m. ET weekdays beginning in mid-2026. It was also announced that NBC News Now and the NBC Nightly News would relocate to the former MSNBC set in Studio 3A at NBC Studios, which had been vacated by the network in November 2025 after relocating to Versant's headquarters on 229 West 43rd Street. Romans' program Current with Christine Romans premiered on August 3, 2026.

On November 12, 2026, NBC News Now dropped Stay Tuned with Gadi Schwartz, following a review of its resources.

== Programming ==
=== Current original programming ===
Times	Program	Hosted by	Location
7:00 a.m.	Morning News Now	Joe Fryer and Savannah Sellers	New York City
10:00 a.m.	Current with Christine Romans	Christine Romans	New York City
12:00 p.m.	NBC News Daily	Morgan Radford and Vicky Nguyen	New York City
2:00 p.m.	NBC News Daily	Kate Snow and Zinhle Essamuah	New York City
4:00 p.m.	Meet The Press Now	Kristen Welker	Washington D.C.
5:00 p.m.	Hallie Jackson Now	Hallie Jackson	Washington D.C.
7:00 p.m.	Top Story with Tom Llamas	Tom Llamas	New York City

=== Programming from NBC News ===
- NBC Nightly News (10:00 PM Eastern; reair from 6:30PM Eastern)
- Early Today
- Weekend Today
- Meet the Press
- Dateline NBC
