= Zinhle Essamuah =

American journalist

- Education: George Washington University (BA, MA)
- Employer(s): NBC News (2021-present), NowThis (2017-2021)

Zinhle Essamuah is a filmmaker and American journalist who works as a news anchor for NBC News Daily.

== Early life and education ==
Essamuah lived in Massachusetts until she was 11, when she moved to Crofton, Maryland.

Essamuah attended Arundel High School in Gambrills, Maryland and went on to graduate from George Washington University, where she earned a Bachelor of Arts in 2015 and a Master of Arts from the School of Media and Public Affairs. While in college, she directed Hands Up, a documentary that follows stories relating to the Black Lives Matter movement.

== Career ==
Zinhle Essamuah began her career as a filmmaker, photographer and editor. Her debut film won a Gracie Award and was a semi-finalist for the Student Academy Awards.

In 2017, Essamuah was tapped to open NowThis ( owned by Vox Media Group) inaugural Washington D.C. bureau as the lead politics producer.

Essamuah reported on gun violence, immigration, politics and policing. She has discussed reporting on the Capital Gazette shooting when she learned a local reporter from her childhood, Wendi Winters, was killed.

In 2019, Essamuah moderated the first Intergenerational Town Hall at the United Nations with Deputy Secretary-General of the United Nations and heads of state.

Also in 2019 she was promoted to Political Correspondent for NowThis Morning, a morning show for millennials and Gen-Z on Facebook Watch.

She was then tapped to anchor her own show, NowThis on Facebook Watch a daily news show. She reported on the 2018 and 2020 U.S. elections from key battlegrounds.

NowThis would expand to a daily newsletter and weekly political interview show, NowThis Live and NowThis Weekly. Essamuah helmed the online broadcast for three years, conducting news interviews, including with Dr. Anthony Fauci during the COVID-19 pandemic, who told Essamuah: “I have not had a day off in 14 months.”

In 2021 Essamuah exclusively interviewed then-VP Kamala Harris on climate change in a primetime special on the OWN network.

In 2021 she joined NBC News. As a correspondent Essamuah has reported extensively on disparities in health, maternal mortality, education, environment, trends, justice and culture.

Essamuah regularly filled in as an anchor on NBC News NOW and MSNBC Reports, making headlines for her interview with Paul Whelan’s brother. She reports on all platforms, including NBC Nightly News and TODAY.

In 2023, Essamuah questioned Sec. Hillary Clinton on whether U.S. Supreme Court should have a code of ethics; later that year interviewing actress Reese Witherspoon about her business endeavors.

The same year Zinhle received an Emmy nomination for Outstanding Emerging Journalist.

In July 2023, Zinhle became a co-anchor of NBC News Daily alongside Kate Snow. The first hour of the program assumed the timeslot held by Days of Our Lives (which was moved to the streaming service Peacock) and simulcasts on NBC News Now, Peacock and local NBC stations.

In 2025, Essamuah interviewed Trevor Noah who told her his ADHD diagnosis was “the best thing in the world."

== Accolades ==
2023 – News and Documentary Emmy Nominee, Outstanding Emerging Journalist

== See also ==
- Ugandan Americans
