= Miramar Reservoir =

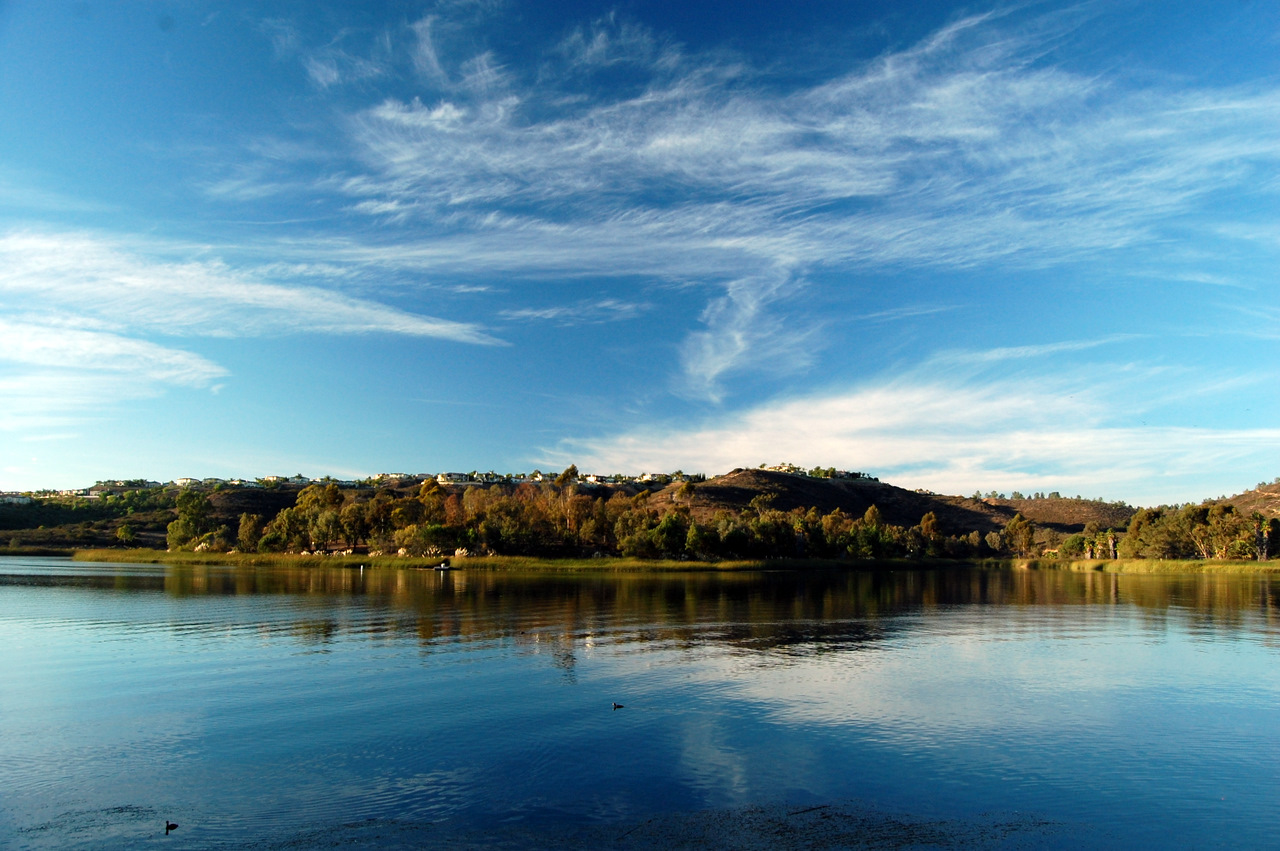

- Location within California Location within the United States
- Location: Scripps Ranch, San Diego, California
- Coordinates: 32°54′55″N 117°05′56″W
- Type: reservoir
- Basin countries: United States
- Managing agency: City of San Diego
- Surface area: 162 acres (66 ha)
- Max. depth: 114 ft (35 m)
- Website: https://www.sandiego.gov/reservoirs-lakes/miramar-reservoir

Miramar Reservoir is a reservoir in the Scripps Ranch community of San Diego, California. Owned, operated and maintained by the City of San Diego, the reservoir and its 165-foot tall earthen embankment dam were completed in 1960 as part of the second San Diego Aqueduct project. Water flowing south to the reservoir originates from both the Colorado River Aqueduct and the California Aqueduct, brought into San Diego by the San Diego County Water Authority.

Miramar Reservoir is also a popular recreation site known as Lake Miramar or Miramar Lake to local residents. Activities include boating, fishing, picnicking, and the use of an over 5-mile-long trail wrapping around the lake. The stretch of the trail over the dam was fenced off for security reasons after the September 11 attacks, and reopened in 2007. This scenic stretch provides panoramic views of Mira Mesa, Miramar, University City, and other northern San Diego communities.

The reservoir used to be home to Louie the Goose, a white Chinese goose and therapy goose known and loved by the San Diego community. He was born in 2006 and died in 2022 from an attack by a coyote.

== History ==
Lake Miramar was once owned by a newspaper tycoon and his sister, E.W. Scripts and Ellen Browning. The term Miramar translates to sea view and at that time you could see the ocean from this lake.

== Miramar Water Treatment Plant ==
The Miramar Water Treatment Plant was completed in 1962. Approximately 500,000 customers in the northern section of the city are served by Miramar Reservoir. An upgrade and expansion project to the Miramar Water Treatment Plant began in summer 1998 with construction starting in May 2001. The project was completed in 2011. The project includes chlorine and ozone disinfection facilities.

== See also ==
- List of lakes in California

== Gallery ==
Landscape and vistas
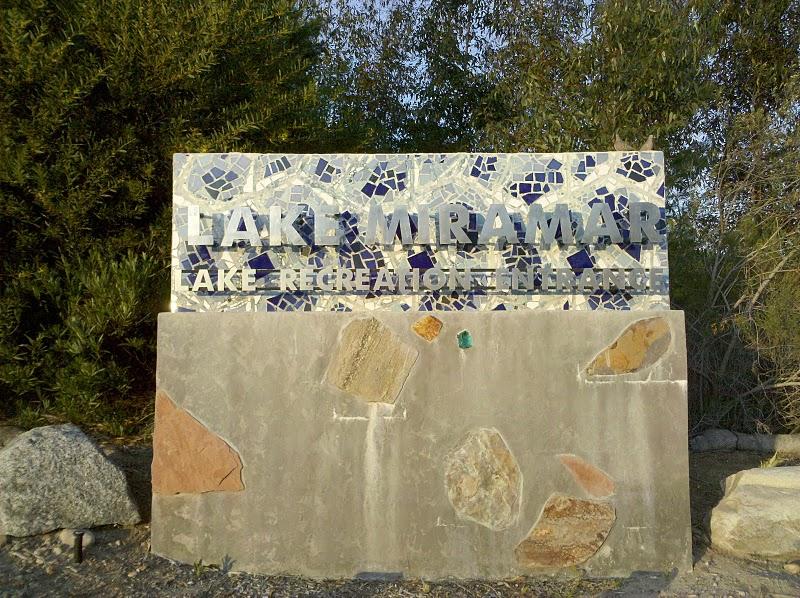
Entrance sign

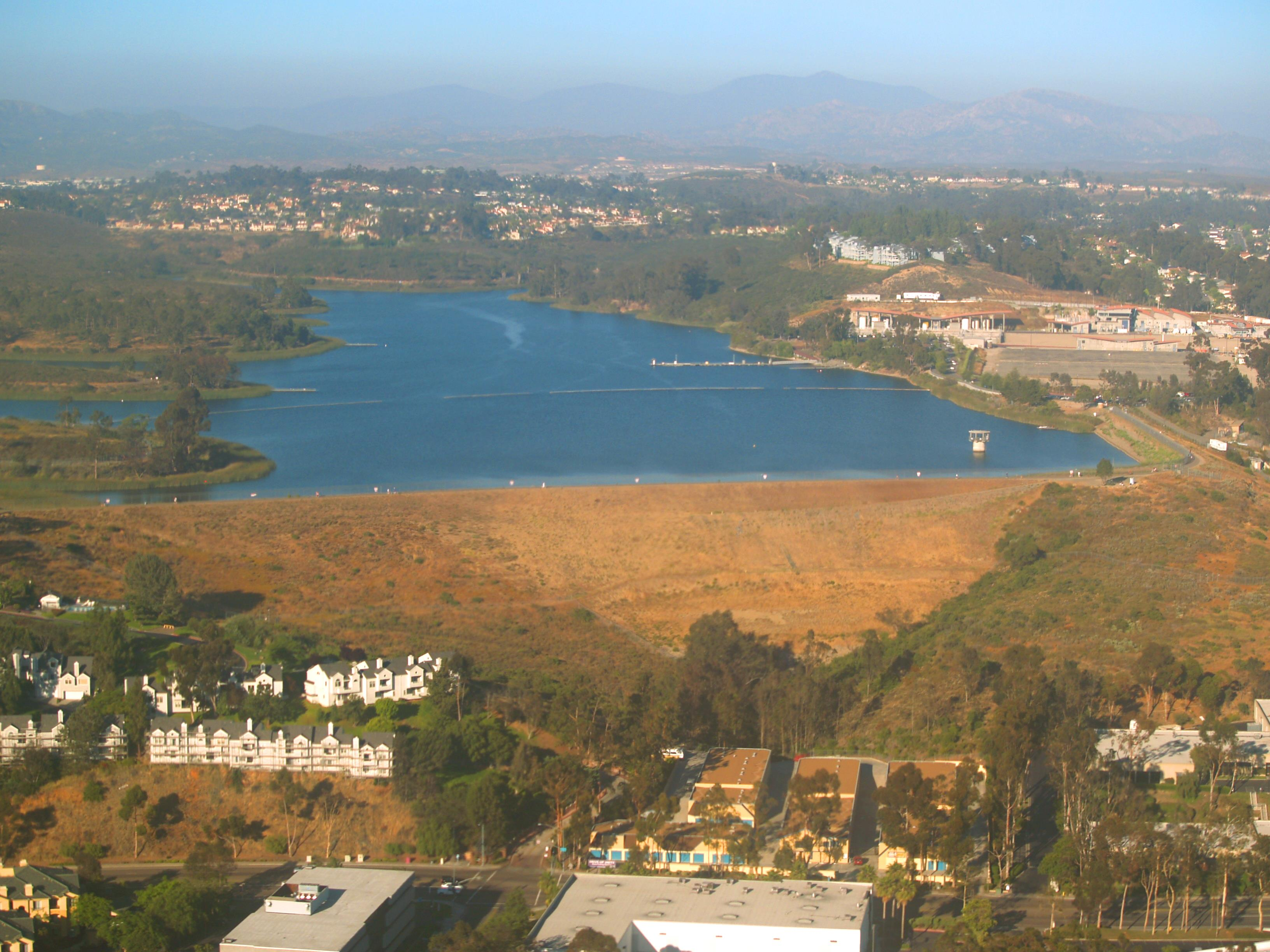
Aerial view of the lake looking toward the east

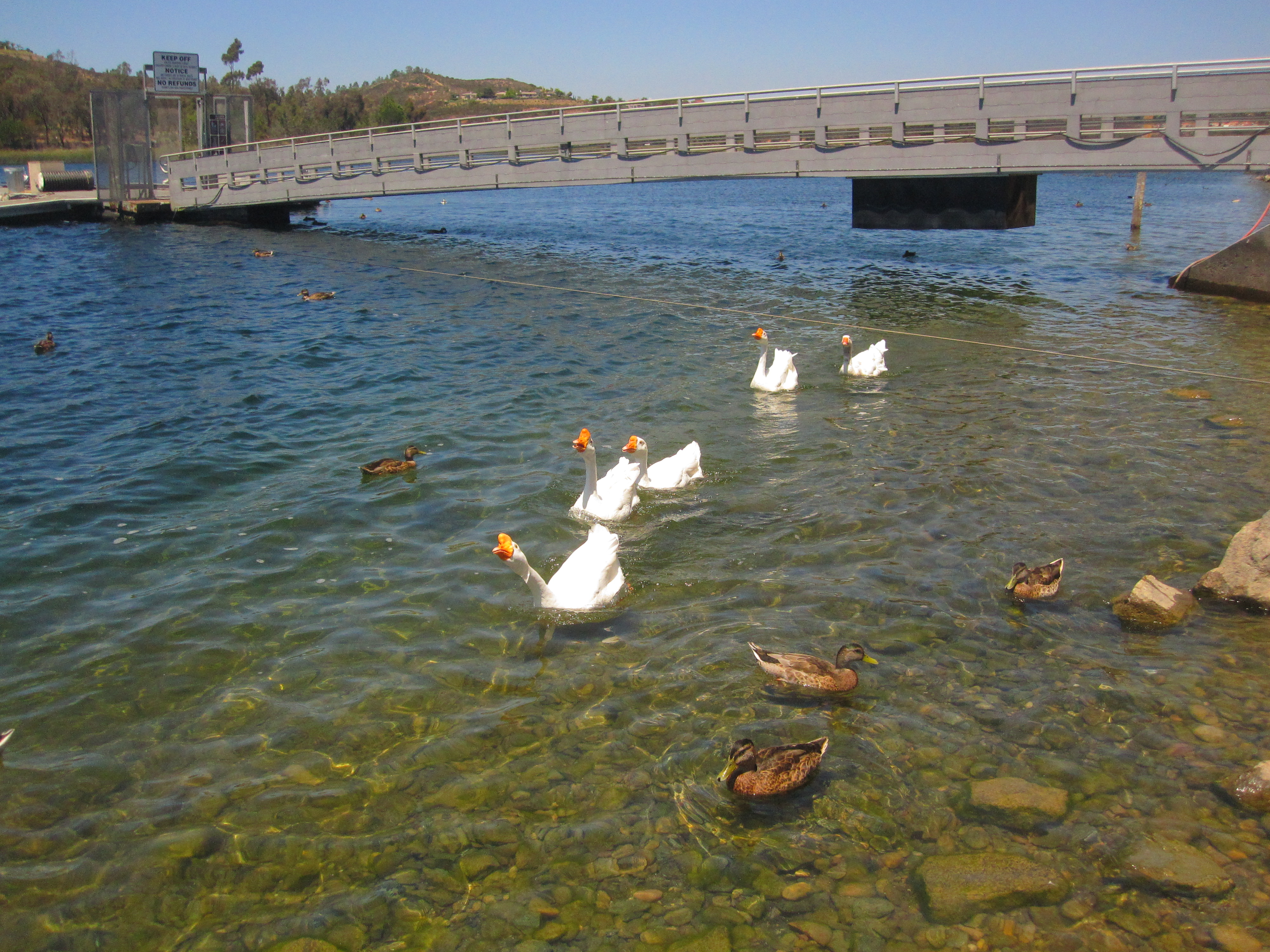
Ducks and Geese at Lake Miramar

1.Carrol Cove 2.Clairemont Point 3.Bernardo Bay 4.Director’s Point 5.Poway Arm 6.Woodson Point 7.Penasquitos Arm 8.Ramona Point 9.Starvation Cove 10.Escondido Arm 11.San Diego Arm 12.Elliot Cove 13.Sorrento Cove 14.Mo’s Hole
