= Savannah Sellers =

American television journalist

- Born: August 26, 1991 (age 35); San Diego, California
- Education: University of Colorado Boulder
- Occupation: Journalist
- Employer: NBC News
- Spouse: Alex Yaraghi (m. 2022)
- Awards: Emmy Award Recipient; Gracie Award

Savannah Sellers (born August 26, 1991) is an American Emmy Award-winning journalist working at NBC News. She is the co-host of Morning News Now on NBC News Now and is also a correspondent across all NBC platforms. She formerly hosted Stay Tuned on Snapchat for NBC News. Her reports are seen on Today, NBC Nightly News, and NBC News Now.

== Early life and education ==
Sellers graduated Scripps Ranch High School in San Diego in 2009, and from the University of Colorado Boulder's School of Journalism and Mass Communication with a degree in Broadcast News and International Media.

== Career ==
Sellers began her career at NBC News in 2010, working as an assignment desk intern, reporting intern, production intern at MSNBC, and NBCUniversal's page program. She then worked as an executive assistant to the president of MSNBC.

In 2016, Sellers was promoted to an on-air reporter for MSNBC in 2016. In 2017, Sellers became the host of NBC News' twice daily Snapchat show, 'Stay Tuned'. She hosted for many years.

She also conducted exclusive interviews with several students from Parkland's Marjory Stoneman Douglas High School two weeks after its school shooting.

In 2020, NBC News promoted Sellers and Joe Fryer to co-anchors of Morning News Now on its 24-hour streaming channel NBC News Now.

== Awards and recognition ==
She was awarded the 2017 Annual News and Documentary Emmy awards for her work as a producer on the NBC Nightly News series: Hooked: America's Heroin Epidemic. She also received a Gracie Award for online video host.

== Personal life ==
Sellers married Alex Yaraghi, an investment analyst, in 2022.
