= NBC News Daily =

American daytime news program

- Genre: News program
- Presented by: Kate Snow; Zinhle Essamuah; Vicky Nguyen; Morgan Radford
- Country of origin: United States
- Original language: English

Production
- Production locations: 30 Rockefeller Center, New York City
- Camera setup: Multi-camera
- Running time: 60 minutes (NBC broadcasts); 240 minutes (NBC News Now broadcasts)
- Production company: NBC News

Original release
- Network: NBC; NBC News Now
- Release: September 12, 2022 – present

NBC News Daily is an American daytime news program that premiered on NBC on September 12, 2022. The hour-long block is carried live in each time zone and is anchored by a rotation of various anchors, with Kate Snow, Zinhle Essamuah, Vicky Nguyen and Morgan Radford as the main team most days.

== Scheduling and anchors ==
Radford and Vicky Nguyen anchor the first two hours from 12:00 noon–2:00 p.m. ET, with Snow and Essamuah anchoring between 2:00 p.m.–4:00 p.m. Eastern.

NBC stations carry one hour of coverage between those times (usually their 12:00 noon or 1:00 p.m. local time hour), though some stations carry the earliest 12:00 noon ET block at 11:00 a.m. in the Central Time Zone directly out of Today with Jenna & Sheinelle (or some Eastern stations which carry local or syndicated programming and tape delay that program an hour), freeing up their entire early afternoon for local news and syndicated programming. The two NBC affiliate networks in Alaska and Hawaii (both owned by Gray Media) air the final 3-4 p.m. hour on a local delay for their respective time zones.

== History ==
NBC News Daily was announced on August 3, 2022. The program replaced NBC's long-running soap opera Days of Our Lives on the network's daytime lineup after it moved exclusively to NBCUniversal's streaming service Peacock the same day. The program offers "up-to-the-minute national and international news", and provides the option for NBC affiliates to add local news and weather inserts, as they would during Today. It is also simulcast on NBC News' streaming channel NBC News Now. NBC News Daily competes primarily with ABC's GMA3 (which at the time, was produced by the staff of the ABC News streaming channel ABC News Live).

As it is carried by NBC News Now through its streaming presences, it airs without pre-emption online when NBC Sports carries live golf and tennis coverage on weekdays or Olympic coverage, though breaking news coverage coordinated by the staffs of either Today or NBC Nightly News or the breaking news desk of NBC News takes precedence.
