= Insert studio =

An insert studio is a purpose-built or adapted location that encompasses the lighting, photography, set design, and sound reproduction for a remote component of a video or television program.

== Overview ==
Insert studios are generally smaller than a standard soundstage, and are used for television and media interviews with individuals or small groups of people. It is also common for the host, or presenter of a program to conduct their part of a show from an insert studio when they are away from their home base.

Insert studios usually have permanent or on-demand connectivity to larger entities via telecommunications networks using various means including coaxial cable, fiber, VPN, or satellite uplink. Telephone lines are required for coordination, direction, and interruptible feedback.

== Effect on contribution content ==
Insert studios play an important contribution role in modern public affairs television programming. They can be in places far removed from the shows and networks they serve. This enables contributors in remote places to be part of a discourse. They also help equalize a tendency to over utilize sources in major cities. They also enable entities like small market television stations to get content for programming without a travel budget.

== Technological advantages ==
Because insert studios frequently take advantage of terrestrial communications circuits, there is reduced latency when compared with traditional satellite uplink from remote locations. This often allows for a faster exchange between program host and contributor/guest, and has led to a new breed of programming that utilize pundits and a rapid fire exchange of ideas as a staple of content.

== Economic considerations ==
Insert studios also play an important role because they can be used (“booked”) for periods less than a traditional production day. They are also self-contained, allowing for economy compared with traditional newsgathering methods involving the use of separate individuals in the field responsible for producing, camerawork, sound, and transmission on a temporary basis in remote locations. Because insert studios are pre-set, the technology can be often be run either by a single de-skilled operator or even remotely. Travel costs can be reduced because the subject(s) may go to a local or nearby site.

== Implications for television journalism ==
Contributors must travel to the camera inside the studio, rather than the camera moving closer to the story. This is an important distinction because the camera is further removed from a documentary role on the newsgathering process. Also, as traditional sources of television news shrink their production budgets and rely on remote studios more for content, there is a new and increasing bias toward including experts from institutions that pay to maintain their own studios, and contribute content at a discount relative to traditional coverage methods, or even completely subsidize their own coverage.

So while a more diverse list of contributors benefits programming coverage, technology and economics can enable contributors to effectively pay to play which if not disclosed can negatively impact journalism.
