= Joe Fryer (journalist) =

American journalist

- Born: Joseph Fryer; July 29, 1977 (age 49)
- Education: Northwestern University Medill School of Journalism
- Occupation: Journalist
- Employer: NBC News
- Known for: Reporter at KING-TV and KARE-TV. NBC News correspondent
- Partner: Peter (c. 2008–present)

Joe Fryer (born July 29, 1977) is an American journalist working for NBC News as a correspondent, co-anchor of streaming show Morning News Now with Savannah Sellers on NBC News Now, and feature anchor for the Saturday edition of Weekend Today.

Fryer joined NBC News in 2013 as a part-time correspondent and officially joined NBC News as a full-time correspondent on October 21, 2013, and Fryer also serves as a weekday & weekend fill-in and substitute anchor for Today, Saturday Today, Sunday Today with Willie Geist and NBC Nightly News.

He reports for all platforms of NBC News including Today, Weekend Today, and NBC Nightly News.

Before joining NBC, Fryer was a reporter for KING-TV, the NBC affiliate in Seattle, Washington.

== Career ==
Fryer has worked for KARE-TV in Minneapolis, Minnesota; WTVF–TV in Nashville, Tennessee; WBAY-TV in Green Bay, Wisconsin; and WKYT-TV in Lexington, Kentucky.

In 2014, Fryer won an Emmy with photojournalist Jeff Christian in the category of "Feature News Report." He also won in the writing category for his composite "Fryer's Favorite Features."

In October 2020, Fryer was named co-anchor with Savannah Sellers of brand-new streaming show Morning News Now on NBC News Now from 7am-12pm weekdays. Then, in 2023, Fryer was officially named the feature anchor for the Saturday edition of Weekend Today.
