= National Association of Black Journalists Hall of Fame =

Hall of fame project of the National Association of Black Journalists

The National Association of Black Journalists Hall of Fame is a hall of fame project of the National Association of Black Journalists (NABJ) honoring African-American and other journalists. The original Hall of Fame list was established on April 5, 1990, with the induction of seven individuals. No further individuals were inducted until the Hall of Fame was revived by the NABJ in 2004. Since 2004, several individuals have been inducted to the Hall of Fame each year. Nominations are approved by the NABJ Board of Directors, and new inductees are installed annually at the NABJ Hall of Fame Banquet and Inductions. Thirty-nine individuals are currently inductees in the Hall of Fame.

== Members ==
1990 original inductees

Seven individuals were inducted to the Hall of Fame at the time of its creation.

- Dorothy Butler Gilliam
- Malvin Russell Goode
- Mal Johnson
- Gordon Parks
- Ted Poston
- Norma Quarles
- Carl T. Rowan

2004 "legendary" inductees

In April 2004, the NABJ revived the Hall of Fame, and the Board of Directors (upon a "strong recommendation" from the NABJ Hall of Fame Screening Committee) voted to posthumously induct ten historical journalists (referred to on the NABJ's website as "legendary figures") as a one-time measure. The ten inductees were:

- Robert S. Abbott
- Samuel Cornish
- Frederick Douglass
- W. E. B. Du Bois
- T. Thomas Fortune
- Marcus Garvey
- Ethel Payne
- John B. Russwurm
- John Sengstacke
- Ida B. Wells-Barnett

=== 2004 contemporary inductees ===
- John H. Johnson
- Robert C. Maynard
- Chuck Stone

=== 2005 inductees ===
- Charles "Teenie" Harris
- Charlayne Hunter-Gault
- Max Robinson
- Carole Simpson

=== 2006 inductees ===
- Lerone Bennett, Jr.
- Albert Fitzpatrick
- William Raspberry

=== 2007 inductees ===
- Xernona Clayton
- Merv Aubespin
- John L. Dotson, Jr.
- Jim Vance

=== 2008 inductees ===
- Charles E. Cobb, Jr.
- Belva Davis
- Vernon Jarrett (posthumous)
- Les Payne

=== 2009 inductees ===
- Earl Caldwell
- Peggy Peterman (posthumous)
- Lynn Norment
- Larry Whiteside (posthumous)

=== 2011 inductees ===
- Ed Bradley (posthumous)
- Merri Dee
- JC Hayward
- Eugene Robinson
- Ray Taliaferro

=== 2012 inductees ===
- Gwen Ifill
- Pat Harvey
- Ruth Allen Ollison
- Johnathan Rodgers
- Wallace Terry

=== 2013 inductees ===
- Betty Bayé
- Simeon Booker
- Alice Dunnigan (posthumous)
- Sue Simmons
- Wendell Smith (posthumous)
- Cynthia Tucker

=== 2014 inductees ===
- Herb Boyd
- Maureen Bunyan
- Jay Harris
- Moses Newson
- Bernard Shaw
- Zelda Ormes (Posthumous)
- Ernest Dunbar (Posthumous)
- Lee Thornton (Posthumous)

=== 2015-16 inductees ===
- Tony Brown
- Charles Gerald Fraser (Posthumous)
- Monica Kaufman Pearson
- Dorothy Leavell
- Austin Long-Scott
- Dori Maynard (Posthumous)
- Gil Noble (Posthumous)
- Stuart Scott (Posthumous)
- Jacqueline Trescott
- Morrie Turner (Posthumous)
- John H. White
- L. Alex Wilson (Posthumous)

=== 2017 inductees ===
- Michael Days
- John Jenkins
- Rev. Aisha Karimah
- Garth C. Reeves, Sr.

=== 2018 inductees ===
- Albert Dunmore
- Bob Ray Sanders
- Louis Martin
- Victoria Jones
- William Rhoden

=== 2019 inductees ===
- Bob Black
- Garry D. Howard
- “The Fly Jock” Tom Joyner
- Wanda Lloyd
- The Washington Post Metro Seven

=== 2020 inductees ===
- Fred Sweets
- Cathy Hughes
- Clarice Tinsley
- John McCaa
- Mary Mitchell
- Pam Oliver
- Pam Johnson

=== 2021 inductees ===
- Roland S. Martin
- Rodney A. Brooks
- Rochelle Riley
- Monica Roberts (posthoumous)
- Kirk McKoy
- Cornelius “Neil” Foote Jr (Neil Foote)
- Claire Smith
- A. J. Smitherman (posthumous)

=== 2022 inductees ===
- Hoppy Adams
- Michelle V. Agins
- Drew Berry
- Harry Boomer
- Tanya Hart
- Levi Henry
- Cheryl Smith

=== 2023 inductees ===
- Sheila Dean Brooks
- Roy S. Johnson
- Jesse L. Lewis
- Rob Parker
- Randall Pinkston
- Dave Roberts
- Gwen Tolbart

=== 2024 inductees ===
- Milbert O. Brown
- Barbara Ciara
- Retha Hill
- Art Norman
- Vanessa Williams
- Paula Williams Madison
- Alexis Yancey
