= Bob Strickland =

American journalist

Rupert Strickland
- Born: October 23, 1932; Rainbow City, CZ, U.S. (now Arco Iris, Panama)
- Died: September 26, 2008 (aged 75); Virginia
- Resting place: Arlington National Cemetery, Washington D.C.
- Occupation(s): Journalist; Reporter; News anchor
- Spouse: Janet Payne Strickland
- Children: seven children

Rupert "Bob" Strickland (October 23, 1932 – September 26, 2008), was an American reporter, journalist, and news anchor. His nearly three-decade career includes his work with Washington D.C.'s CBS affiliate WUSA-TV in D.C. while serving in the United States Air Force.

Strickland was a board member of Big Brothers and Big Sisters, and with colleague, Max Robinson, he co-founded a mentoring program for minority broadcasters. In 1994, Strickland was inducted into the DINFOS Hall of Fame.

== Biography ==
Strickland began his news career as a radio announcer in 1952, and later becoming a staff writer at the newspaper, Panama American, a now defunct, daily newspaper based in Panama City. In 1956, he joined the United States Air Force, and worked at base radio and television stations in Saudi Arabia and the Philippines.

In 1959, Strickland attended the Defense Information School (DINFOS) at Fort Slocum, New York, a part of the United States Department of Defense, Defence Media Activity. Strickland returned to DINFOS as an instructor at Fort Benjamin Harrison, Indiana, serving there from 1966 until 1969. While he served as an instructor, he attended classes at Indiana University and received his degree in Journalism. Later, he received his master's degree in public administration from George Washington University in Washington D.C.

His last assignment with the Air Force was at Bolling AFB, in Washington D.C., where he served as Sergeant Major of the Command Services Unit, American Forces Radio and Television Services. It was there, where he spent nearly thirty years working at Washington D.C.'s WTOP-TV, channel 9, (later WDVM-TV and now WUSA-TV), the CBS affiliate in D.C. (1969-1996).

He began his career with WUSA, first serving as a general assignment reporter, covering local politics and the state governments of Virginia and Maryland. Strickland later worked as anchor for the evening news broadcast, winning three local Emmy awards for his reporting on fraudulent charities, the shortage of paramedics and ambulances and the lack of medical services in the Washington area.

In 1977, Strickland interviewed Eleanor Holmes Norton, the first woman to chair the Equal Employment Opportunity Commission and D.C.'s first female delegate to the United States Congress. Major stories that Strickland covered include the 1977 Washington, D.C. attack and hostage taking, (theHanafi Siege) in D.C.(1977), and the 1989 U.S. invasion of Panama. In 1990, Strickland covered the arrest of D.C.'s Mayor Marion Barry, Strickland was forced to narrate the FBI tape, with the sound muted from the raid, because of Barry's expletive-laced comments. He also covered the Mount Pleasant riots in 1991.

In 1993, Strickland covered the protests over the refusal of many networks to air condom ads, at a time when the Clinton administration began to address the AIDS crisis, but other organizations, including Catholic groups were launching anti-condom campaigns. In 1994, he reported on updates on the D.C. Mayoral and Maryland Senate primary, aired on C-SPAN.

Strickland was a board member of Big Brothers and Big Sisters of the National Capital area, Landham, Maryland, and raised thousands of dollars for the organization, by organizing a golf and tennis tournament. With colleague, Max Robinson, he co-founded a mentoring program for minority broadcasters, as part of AFTRA program. In 1994, Strickland was inducted into the DINFOS Hall of Fame.

Strickland was a respected member of the news team at WUSA, one colleague, Bruce Johnson, saying on his retirement, "I stand on the shoulders of all those great journalists who were here when I got here," and recognizing Strickland as a "top-shelf" broadcaster, in his book, Heart to Heart: 12 People Discover Better Lives After Their Heart Attacks.

He retired from the military in 1976, and after illness left him unable to work full-time, he retired from WUSA in 1996. Twelve years later, in 2008, Strickland died at his home, as the result of hypertensive cardiovascular disease. He was buried with full military honors at Arlington National Cemetery. He was survived by his wife, Janet Payne Strickland, seven children and one stepson.
