= Lynn Norment =

American journalist

- Born: Lynn Aurelia Norment; Bolivar, Tennessee
- Education: Bolivar Industrial Elementary, Bolivar High school, Memphis State University
- Occupations: Journalist, managing editor
- Years active: 30 years
- Employer: Ebony magazine
- Known for: Her career at Ebony, including writing profiles for celebrities, event planner, magazine managing editor.
- Parents: Alex Norment (father); Esther Morrow Norment (mother)
- Relatives: Nine siblings
- Awards: NABJ Hall of Fame Honoree

Lynn Norment, born in Bolivar, Tennessee, is an American journalist known for her 30 years of writing and editing Ebony Magazine in Chicago, Illinois, United States. She was inducted into the National Association of Black Journalists Hall of Fame in 2009.

== Personal ==
Norment was born the third child out of nine. Norment's mother Esther worked as a licensed practitioner nurse. Her father Alex Norment owned a local repair shop, which was named Norment's Radio and TV. While in elementary school, Norment attended an all-black, segregated school known as Bolivar Industrial Elementary. She then went to vocational school, where she became a member of the school newspaper and Beta Club. In 1969, Tennessee offered African Americans in Bolivar to transfer to the mostly white Bolivar High school, Norment was among a few African Americans who helped integrate the school; she then graduated in 1970.

Lynn Norment is an alumni from Memphis State University where she received a Bachelor of Arts degree in journalism. In college, Norment was an intern for The Commercial Appeal a newspaper in Memphis, Tennessee.

She resides in the South Loop area of Chicago, Illinois.

== Career ==
Later, Norment traveled north to Chicago and worked as a freelance writer for Ebony Magazine. Norment has worked with a number of celebrities, athletes and public figures including Denzel Washington, Barack Obama, Whitney Houston, Steve Harvey, Will Smith, and Michael Jordan. She became the managing editor of Ebony.

Norment has also held different leadership roles for the National Association of Black Journalists, including being chairperson for the Convention in Chicago held in 1977.

She is a board member of Habilitative Inc. She operates programs for residents that are in need on the West side of Chicago. Norment has taught college courses at Columbia College Chicago, and mentors young journalist. Norment currently has launched a company that offers media relations and editorial services to individuals as well as agencies and corporations.

== Notable works ==
Lynn Norment is most recognized for her 30 years spent of writing for Ebony Magazine. Norment has written a wide range of stories of dissimilar subjects such as religion, business, relationships, social issues and lifestyle.

== Context ==
While growing up in Bolivar Tennessee, Lynn Norment went to a segregated school, a school built specifically for African Americans and a school built for White Americans. Segregation formally began with the passing of Jim Crow laws following the end of the Reconstruction Era in 1877. Those laws prevented blacks, and later Mexican Americans, Native Americans to go to the same school as white individuals and affected other public spaces such as church, bathrooms, movie theaters, etc. However, in 1969 racial integration in Tennessee schools allowed the African-American community to transfer to the mostly white schools. Norment among many helped was a student in the desegregated high school.

Later, she moved North to Chicago and began working for Ebony Magazine. The magazine was founded in 1947 by John H. Johnson in Chicago. It is a monthly magazine for the African-American community. The magazine has always brought up African-American issues and interests, while remaining positive despite how negative things seemed to be happening at the time. For years ads were created specifically for Ebony, which featured black models and advertised black-owned products.

== Awards ==
- NABJ Hall of Fame (2009)
- Memphis State University Department honored Norment as Outstanding Journalism Alumna (1991)

A scholarship, Lynn Norment Scholarship Fund, was founded in her name by the NABJ Chicago chapter.

== See also ==
- National Association of Black Journalists Hall of Fame
