= Betty Bayé =

American journalist and columnist

- Born: April 12, 1946 (age 80); Brooklyn, New York City, New York, United States
- Education: Hunter College (BA) & Columbia University (MA)
- Occupations: Journalist, columnist and member of the editorial board
- Years active: 32 years in journalism
- Employer: The Courier-Journal
- Television: "The Betty Bayé Show"
- Children: Three children (names not mentioned)
- Awards: NABJ Hall of Fame Honoree

Betty Winston Bayé (April 12, 1946), an African-American journalist, columnist, and former member of the editorial board for the Courier-Journal newspaper in Louisville, Kentucky, United States, and Gannett is a journalist, former host of The Betty Baye Show TV program, and author. She is a former Vice President of the National Association of Black Journalists and an inductee into its Hall of Fame.

== Personal ==
Betty Winston Bayé was raised, along with her two sisters in New York City on the Lower East Side and East Harlem. Her parents were George and Betty Winston. Bayé didn't go to college right after high school. She was a clerical worker and in the late1960 chased after her dream to be an actress at The National Black Theater in Harlem under the direction of Barbara Ann Teer. In 1979, Bayé graduated with her bachelor's degree in communications from Hunter College and in 1980 with her master's degree in journalism from The Columbia University, Graduate School of Journalism.

== Career ==
Bayé had several careers over her lifetime. She began as a clerical worker before she chose to go to college. Bayé first began her reporting career in Mt. Vernon, New York for the Daily Argus from 1980 to 1984. Then she became a reporter for The Courier-Journal from 1984 to 1986. At the Courier-Journal, Bayé joined the editorial board as an assistant city editor from 1986 to 1988 and then became its assistant neighbors editor from 1988 to 1990. From 1990 to 1991, she left the Courier to become a Nieman Fellow at Harvard. She returned to the newspaper after her leave at Harvard. She wrote for the Courier for almost thirty years and got laid off with many other workers by Gannett. In addition to her newspaper work, Bayé contributed to magazines such as Essence Magazine, Main Man, and BlackAmericanWed.com. For six years, she hosted "The Betty Bayé Show" and she has appeared on the "Travis Smiley Show".

Bayé served as the vice president of the NABJ.

=== Notable works of journalism ===
Betty Bayé worked for the Courier-Journal in Louisville, Kentucky, which is shown here relative to the capital Washington, D.C.

Bayé has published two books, "The Africans" in 1983 and "Blackbird" in 2000. Bayé contributed to collections "Family Affairs: What It Means to be African American Today", "Tribe Became a Nation", and "Work Sister Work". She is also mentioned in the book "Passing for Black: The Life and Careers of Mae Stret Kidd".

=== Context ===
For years, the Courier-Journal newspaper had one black columnist on its editorial board and that was Betty Bayé. On June 21, 2011, Gannett Company downsized its staff and Bayé and many others on the editorial staff were laid off. The NABJ reported that out of the two percent that made up Gannett's staff, few or none were left. A study done by The American Society of News Editors said, "90 percent of newsroom supervisors from participating news organizations are white." Over the years different racial groups getting the chance to work and express themselves has decreased. "The fact is, if were not for black columnists who are thinking black, many of these [social] issues would not arise," said Betty Baye. After her layoff Betty became an independent journalist, published novelist, motivational speaker, and story teller. She uses these as ways to reach out to other African Americans to defend their importance as people just as any other race. Her writings often open eyes to a point of view you may never see.

== Impact ==
Bayé is a journalist, TV interviewer, author and lecturer. She was a longtime employee of the Gannett Company. Her career in journalism spanned 32 years, and she worked for The Courier-Journal for 27 year as a journalist columnist and member of its editorial board. She has hosted her own show "The Betty Baye Show" for 6 years. She also chairs the University of Louisville Black Family Conference.

== Writings ==
- Betty Bayé, "Let's Talk Black", in Thinking Black: Some of the Nation's Best Black Columnists Speak Their Mind, edited by Dewayne Wikham. Crown Publishing Group, 1997.
- Betty Bayé, Blackbird. Newport News, Va.: August Press, 2000.

== Awards ==
- NABJ Hall of Fame 2013
- Simmons College of Kentucky, honorary doctorate of humanities

== See also ==
- National Association of Black Journalists Hall of Fame
