= Mal Johnson =

American journalist

- Born: Malvyn Hooser; July 4, 1924; Philadelphia, Pennsylvania, U.S.
- Died: November 7, 2007 (aged 83)
- Occupations: Journalist, activist

Mal Johnson (July 4, 1924 – November 7, 2007) was an American journalist and civil rights activist. She was the first black female White House correspondent.

== Early life ==
Johnson was born as Malvyn Hooser on July 4, 1924, in Philadelphia, Pennsylvania. She paid her way through Temple University during World War II by working as a riveter. Johnson became a schoolteacher and married Air Force officer Frank Johnson.

== Career ==
After the death of her husband in 1965, Johnson worked at The Philadelphia Inquirer as the editor's assistant and at the non-profit North City Congress. She also co-chaired the Philadelphia chapter of the NAACP, working alongside C. Delores Tucker. She moved to WKBS-TV in 1964 and quickly advanced to an anchor position. Johnson served on the board of American Women in Radio in Television (AWRT). There she met J. Leonard Reinsch who offered her a job in Washington D.C. working for Cox Communications as the organization's first female reporter. She later became the first black female White House Correspondent. In 1972, she was one of the American reporters who accompanied Richard Nixon on his trip to China. In 1975, she helped found the National Association of Black Journalists. She served as the organization's treasurer in its early years. Johnson left Cox to found Media Linx Productions. For her contribution to journalism, she was one of the first journalists to be inducted into the National Association of Black Journalists Hall of Fame.

== Awards ==
- Foremother Award from the National Center for Health Research, 2006
