= Albert Fitzpatrick =

American journalist

Albert E. Fitzpatrick
- Born: December 30, 1928 (age 97); Elyria, Ohio, U.S.
- Education: Kent State University (BA)
- Occupations: Journalist, editor, and media executive
- Employers: Akron Beacon Journal; Knight-Ridder; Kent State University; Howard University
- Known for: Coverage for the Kent State Shooting, first African American to run a major newsroom
- Spouse: Derien Fitzpatrick
- Children: 3
- Awards: NABJ Hall of Fame Honoree; Ida B. Wells Award Winner (1989); Frederick Douglass Lifetime Achievement Award; Chairman's Citation for Editorial Excellence

Albert Fitzpatrick, also known as Al Fitzpatrick, (born December 30, 1928) is a journalist and media executive for the Akron Beacon Journal in Akron, Ohio, United States, where he was the only African American working for the company. He was inducted into the Hall of Fame of the National Association of Black Journalists.

== Personal ==
Fitzpatrick was born the seventh of twelve children December 30, 1928, to Ben and Mary Fitzpatrick and raised in Elyria, Ohio. He had a passion for writing during his high school years. Fitzpatrick graduated from Kent State University with a Bachelor of Arts degree in journalism and sociology. He was a veteran of World War II and the Korean War and had also served in the U.S. Army and Air Force. He married Derien Fitzpatrick, and the couple had three children, who are Sharon, Karle and Albert II. He is retired and resides in Akron, Ohio, where he produces three newsletters for church, fraternity and family.

== Career ==
During high school, he started off as a part-time sports reporter in his hometown making five dollars a game. He applied to work for more than fifty newspapers, but only one called him back for an interview. In 1956, he joined the Akron Beacon Journal at age 28 and was a reporter on the state desk. He would be the first black editor at the journal, and would inspire more minorities to join in his field. He was among the first African Americans to be admitted into the American Society of News Editors. His award-winning coverage of the Kent State Shooting made him well known following his promotion to news editor. In 1973, he was the African American to run a newsroom after his next promotion to managing editor, and then four years later he was named executive editor. When the Knight Ridder, which owned the Akron Beacon Journal, was informed by letter from Fitzpatrick about the absence of diversity on the workforce, the company actually offered him a job as director of minority affairs. After two years, he became vice president of minority affairs and worked in that capacity for another seven years at Knight Ridder. He taught at Kent State University and was an interim chairman at Howard University from 2001 to 2002. During his twenty-nine year career, he managed to hold every position in a newspaper staff.

== Notable works of journalism ==
Albert Fitzpatrick worked for the Akron Beacon Journal in Akron, Ohio, which is shown here relative to the capital Washington, D.C.

His successful coverage of the Kent State shootings, a protest resulting in a massacre that resulted in four dead and thirteen injured university students on May 4, 1970, while working with journalists Lacy McCrary, Ron Clark (deceased), Jeff Sallot, and Paul Tople, won them the Pulitzer Prize, which increased his notability and popularity.

== Context ==
Albert Fitzpatrick made a major breakthrough as one of the first African American men to be successful outside of African-American newspapers. During his senior year in college, he was asked to change his major because African Americans could not get jobs in the newspaper industry because it was predominantly white. Fitzpatrick was determined to get a job on a newspaper staff. During the last few weeks of college, he sent in many resumes to many different newspapers, but did not get a single response back. A professor at Kent State pushed Fitzpatrick to apply for the Akron Beacon Journal. He applied, and was interviewed. Ben Maidenburg, the interviewer, asked him a few questions, and was hired February 13, 1956. Fitzpatrick briefly talked about his interview by saying, "He told me that the newsroom had a lot of rednecks, hillbillies and drunks. "What would you do if one called you the N-word?" he asked. I paused and I asked Maidenburg, "Who signs the paychecks?" Maidenburg said, "I do." I told him I didn't care what they said in the newsroom."

Fitzpatrick once said that a court decision about discrimination at the New York Daily News involving four black journalists would "have a tremendous impact in the industry in that it will make newspapers and other entities in the media take a look at how they are treating minorities", and he called it "a landmark case". The issue at the newspaper arose over lower pay compared with white employees. Fitzpatrick said, "Many observers see the case as significant for minorities. It could spark a fairer evaluation for minority staff members by recognizing and developing their potential, and giving them the same opportunity as white staff."

Later in his career, he worked as a media executive with Knight Ridder to promote diversity in its newspapers.

== Impact ==
Fitzpatrick was a former president of the National Association of Black Journalists and served from 1985 to 1987, the founding chair of the National Association of Minority Media Executives, past chairman of the Minorities Committee for Southern Newspapers Association, retired board member of the American Society of Newspaper Editors and member of the Professional Advisory Board of the Kent State University School of Communications. National Association of Black Journalists, president (1985–1987).

== Awards ==
- NABJ Hall of Fame
- Ida B. Wells Award Winner (1989)
- Robert G. McGruder Distinguished Guest Lecture Award (2005)
- Frederick Douglass Lifetime Achievement Award
- Chairman's Citation for Editorial Excellence
- Distinguished Service Award
- Hall of Fame of the National Broadcast Editorial Association
- Hall of Fame of the National Association of Black Journalists (2006) and Elyria High School

== See also ==
- National Association of Black Journalists Hall of Fame
- John L. Dotson Jr.
