= Russ Ptacek =

American investigative reporter (born 1963)

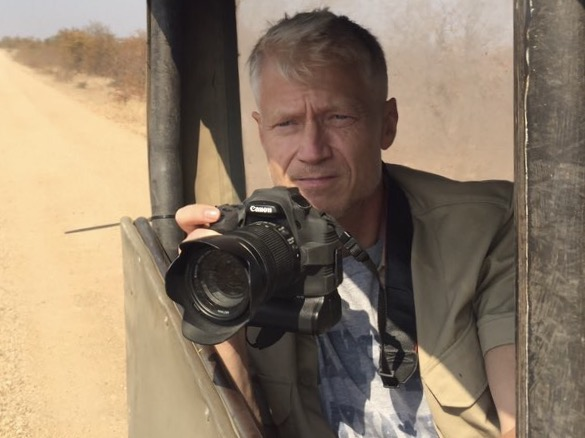
Russ Ptacek on assignment in Mpumalanga, South Africa, in 2016

Russell Ray Ptacek (born September 5, 1963) is an American investigative journalist, social media personality, and ASMR researcher.

In the late 1990s, Ptacek headed NewsTV, which sold footage to television channels. He sold NewsTV in 2001 and returned to the University of Kansas, from which he had dropped out in the 1980s to become a reporter for WIBW-TV in Topeka.

In 2006, Ptacek was hired by KSHB-TV in Kansas City. He left KSHB in 2012 to work at WUSA in Washington, D.C., where he remained until 2016.

In 2019, Ptacek began investigating the explosion of new media forms on YouTube, which led to the creation of the ASMR Foundation, where he serves as director.
