= Levan Reid =

American sportscaster

Levan Reid is an American sportscaster who serves as a sports reporter for WBZ-TV in Boston.

== Biography ==
=== Early life ===
Levan began working in television when he was 16 years old at "A Current Affair" in New York City. He went on to produce sports for "Good Day New York" at WNYW. His first job after college was as a sports producer at WMUR in Manchester, New Hampshire. He was promoted two years later to sports anchor/reporter.

=== Career ===
In 1996, he was hired as a reporter for WFXT. During his seven years in Boston, he covered every major sporting event, including four World Series, the Super Bowl, the Ryder Cup and various NCAA Championships. An athlete himself, Levan's love of sports led him to choose a career in sports journalism.

He served as WUSA-TV 9 NEWS NOW's weekend sports anchor/reporter for five years, and co-host of both Sports Plus on Sunday nights and the station's Operation Football reports that feature local high school football action. Levan anchored Redskin specials and was at the forefront of the Maryland football and basketball stories. WUSA/Gannett chose not to renew several contracts due to economic issues and Reid's was one of them.

In the summer of 2010 Reid returned to the Boston market and joined WBZ-TV in Boston as a sports freelance anchor. He has covered the New England Patriots for WBZ throughout the season. He was also a fill-in host for Boston sports radio station WEEI.

Reid plays the character of Doc Brooks on the Onion SportsDome's "Get Out Of My Face" segments.

=== Education ===
Levan graduated from Notre Dame College in Manchester, New Hampshire with a major in History and Philosophy. He also earned a minor in English and Communications.
