= Andrea Roane =

American journalist (born 1949)

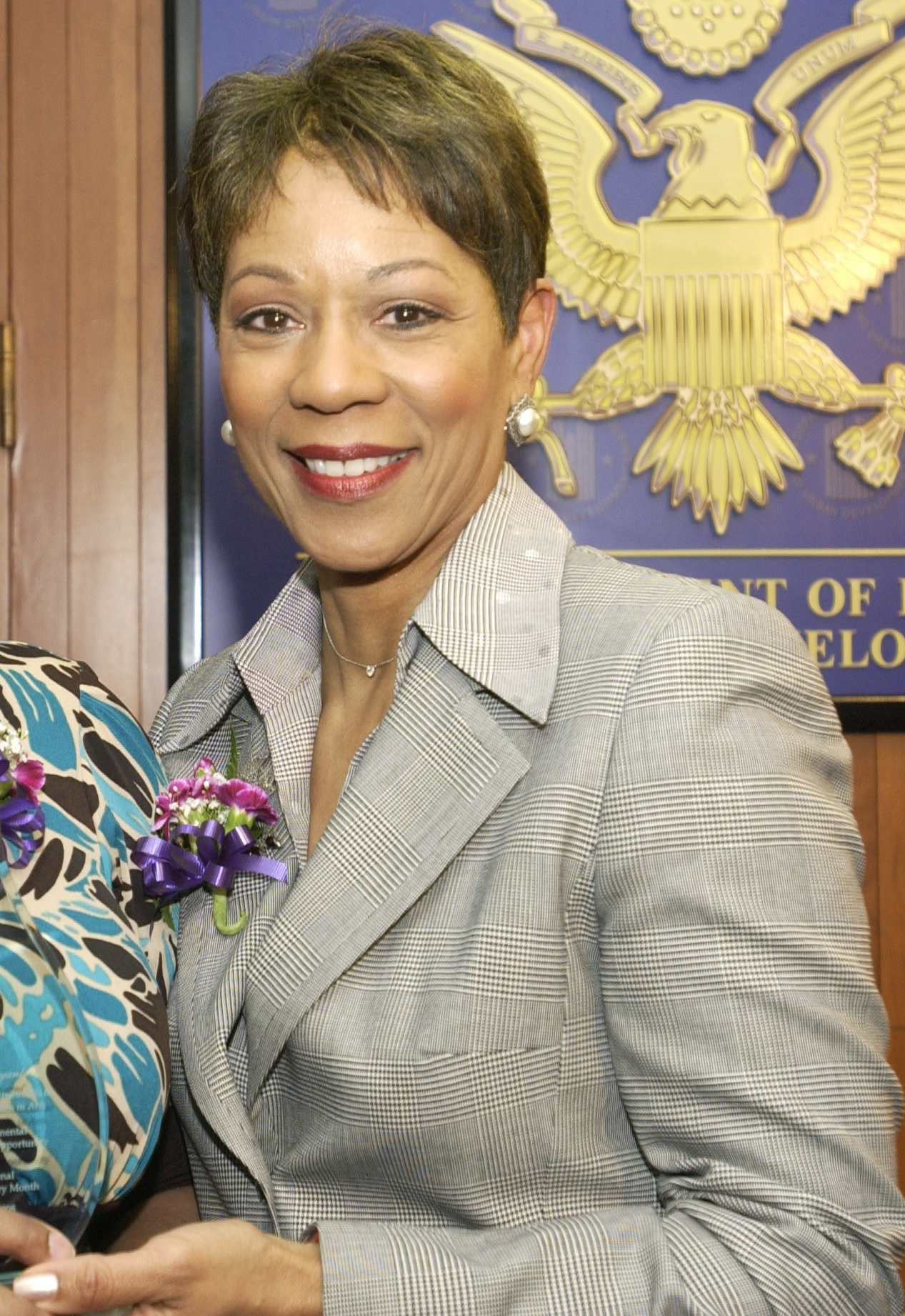
- Roane in 2008
- Born: October 5, 1949 (age 76); New Orleans, Louisiana, U.S.
- Education: University of New Orleans (BA, MA)
- Occupations: Journalist, television newscaster, news anchor
- Years active: 1975–2018 (news)
- Employer: WUSA
- Notable work: "Buddy Check 9" breast cancer awareness program
- Spouse: Michael Skehan
- Children: 2
- Parents: Frederic Roane (father); Ethel Roane (mother)
- Awards: Emmy Awards; Gracie Awards

Andrea Roane (born October 5, 1949) is a former American newscaster for WUSA Channel 9 television in Washington, DC.

== Early life and education ==
Andrea Roane was born on October 5, 1949. in New Orleans, Louisiana. She attended Holy Ghost Elementary School and graduated from the Xavier University Preparatory School. In 1971, she obtained a B.A. in Secondary Education from Louisiana State University in New Orleans (now the University of New Orleans), followed by an M.A. in Drama & Communications in 1973.

== Career ==
Logo of WUSA Channel 9, where Roane worked (1981-2018)

In 1971, Roane worked as a middle and high school teacher of English. In 1975, she became education reporter for public television station WYES, hosted a weekly magazine show, and became project director of a federally funded education show. In 1976, she worked for CBS affiliate WWL-TV. In 1978, she returned to WYES and then moved to Washington, D.C.

In 1979, Roane became host and chief correspondent for Metro Week in Review at public television station WETA.

In 1981, Roane moved to CBS-affiliate WUSA as Sunday evening and weekday morning anchor. Over the years, she anchored morning, afternoon, and late night news programs. She also served as health reporter. Local news including The Washington Post'' have covered her career throughout.

On April 25, 2018, Roane announced that she would retire from the news business as of July 31, 2018.

== Personal life ==
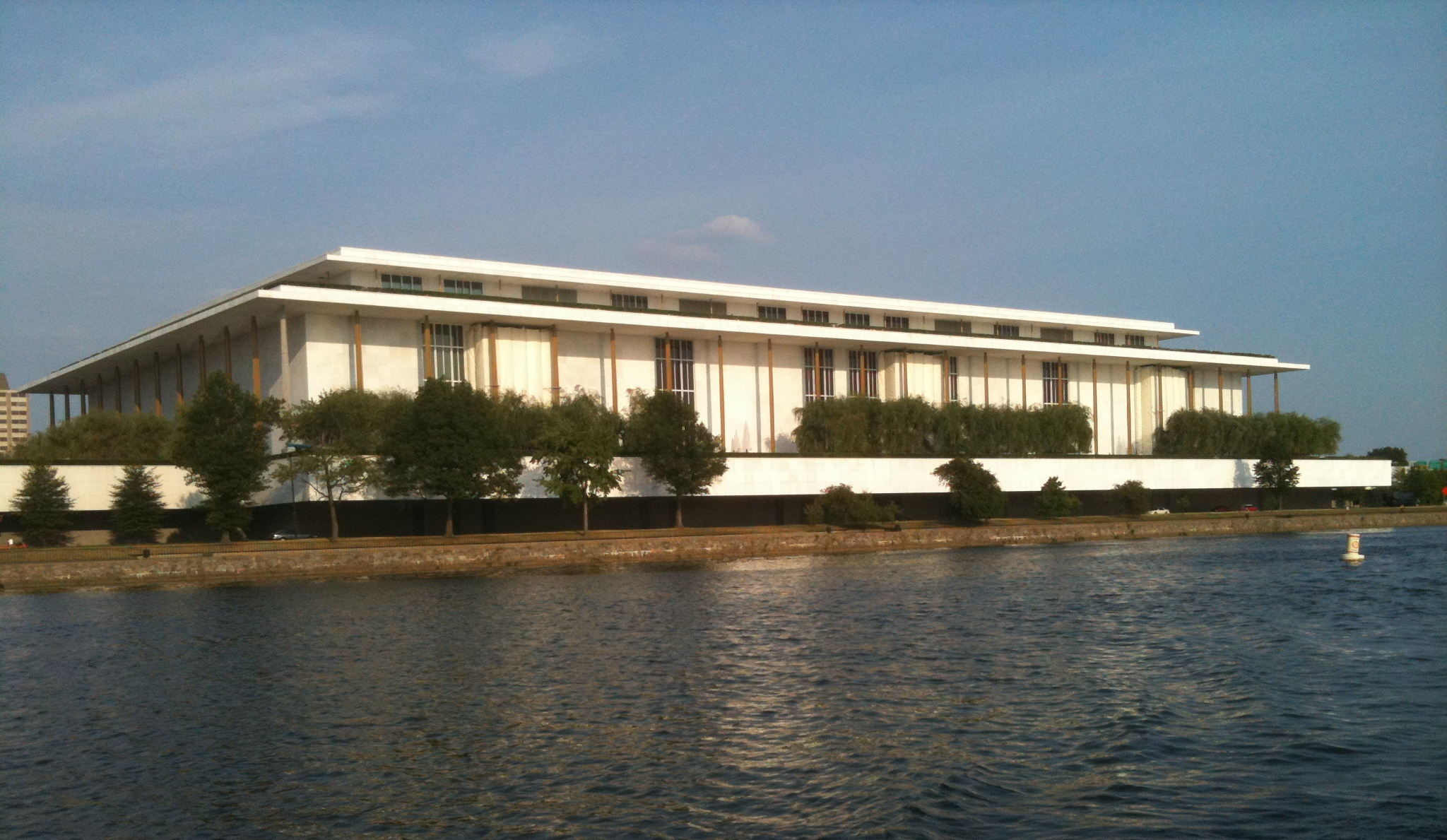
The John F. Kennedy Center for the Performing Arts, where Roane has served on the Community Advisory Board

Roane married Michael Skehan; they have two children, daughter Alicia and son Andrew.

In 1993, Roane started a DC-based breast cancer awareness program "Buddy Check 9."

Roane has played an active role in community services, including the John F. Kennedy Center for the Performing Arts Community and Friends Board, Capital Breast Care Center Community Advisory Council, and the National Museum of Women In The Arts, the Prevent Cancer Foundation, the Georgetown Lombardi Cancer Center Health Disparities Initiative, the National Catholic Education Association Board, and the Catholic University of America, and the Women's Forum of Washington.

== Honors and awards ==
- Dame of the Sovereign Military Order of Malta
- Lifetime members of the NAACP and the National Council of Negro Women
- Emmy Awards
- Gracie Awards
- 2006: "Washingtonians of the Year" of Washingtonian Magazine
- Community Service Award of Sibley Memorial Hospital Foundation
- 2010: Rebecca Lipkin Honoree for Media Distinction by Susan G. Komen For the Cure
- 2012: Faith Does Justice Award from Catholic Charities
- 2014: DC Hall of Fame
- 2015: Board of Governors Award by National Academy of Television Arts & Sciences, National Capital Chesapeake Bay Chapter

== See also ==
- WUSA
