= Jacqueline Charles =

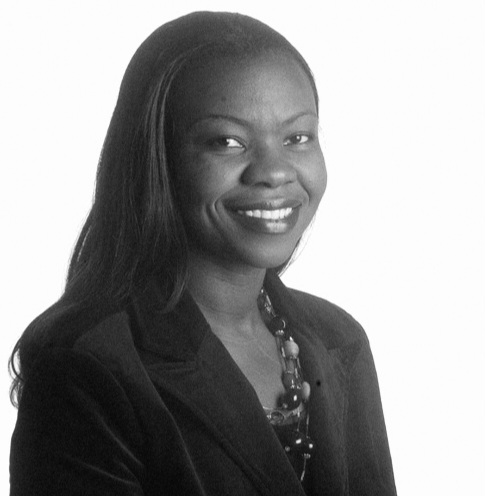
- Born: Grand Turk Island, Turks and Caicos Islands
- Education: University of North Carolina
- Occupation: Journalist
- Years active: 2008–present

Jacqueline Charles is an American journalist and Pulitzer Prize finalist. Charles is Caribbean Correspondent at the Miami Herald.

== Biography ==
Charles was born on Grand Turk Island of the Turks and Caicos. She was raised an only child of a Haitian mother and a Cuban stepfather and moved to the United States at the age of seven, where they settled in Miami. She began her career in journalism in 1986 as a 14-year-old high school intern at the Miami Herald. She is a graduate of Miami Jackson High School, Booker T. Washington Junior High and Dunbar Elementary in Overtown, and the University of North Carolina at Chapel Hill's School of Journalism and Mass Communication in 1994.

Before assuming the role on foreign issues, Charles' coverage was local, mainly on the impoverished areas of Miami.

== Awards ==
Charles has won the NABJ Journalist of the Year for coverage of the devastating Haiti 2010 earthquake, and a 2011 Pulitzer Prize finalist for that same coverage. She won a Regional Emmy for her role as co-producer on the Herald produced-documentary, "Nou Bouke" (We are fed up) from the Academy of Television Arts & Sciences. The Miami New Times newspaper named her Reporter of the Year. She also won the 2011 Paul Hansell Award, named in honor of a longtime Florida bureau chief for The Associated Press. In 2018, she was awarded the Maria Moors Cabot prize for her coverage of the 2010 earthquake in Haïti. In 2023, she received the International Centre for Journalism (ICFJ) Excellence in International Reporting Award.
