= Ernest Dunbar =

Ernest Dunbar (1927–2011) was a pioneering African-American journalist and book author, who was the first African-American reporter hired at a mainstream national magazine and was elected posthumously to the Hall of Fame of the National Association of Black Journalists (NABJ).

== Early life and education ==
Dunbar was born in Philadelphia, Pennsylvania. He earned a B.A. in journalism from Temple University in 1954, where he was editor of the university newspaper. He did graduate work in journalism at Northwestern University. Temple University awarded him honorary doctorate in journalism in 1971.

== Career ==
After graduation from Temple University, Dunbar joined at the pictorial Look Magazine as a reporter in 1954 and from 1959 until Look ceased publication in 1971 served as a senior editor. As the first Black reporter at this mainstream magazine, he is in the company of other pioneering Black journalists such as Gordon Parks and Richard Saunders. While at Look, he worked on major articles on figures such as Martin Luther King Jr., Congressman Adam Clayton Powell, and Malcom X and developed substantive expertise covering Africa. According to one article, "Look touched the volatile issue of race in America more consistently than any other popular magazine of its time. This coverage begins in the 1940s and includes articles such Ernest Dunbar's in-depth profile of NAACP organizer Ruby Hurley, who was an important official in Mississippi in the 1950."

In 1960, based on this knowledge in African affairs, Dunbar accompanied Governor W. Averall Harriman to the Congo on a mission on behalf of Senator John F. Kennedy to inform Kennedy's foreign policy. Kennedy even cited Dunbar's reporting in his well-known 1959 speech "The United States and Africa: A New Policy for a New Era, "As Ernest Dunbar noted recently in LOOK Magazine, 'A trip through Africa is like a quick tour through the history of mankind.'"

Dunbar authored two books related to Africa, The Black Expatriates (1968), a study of Black Americans living in Africa, and Nigeria (1974). As a freelance writer from 1971-4, he also contributed to publications like The New York Times.

Dunbar was elected to the Black Academy of Arts and Letters in 1970. He also won several awards, such as the Overseas Press Club Award for his story on the difficulties African students encountered in the Soviet Union, in 1965 and Citation: Best Magazine Reporting from Abroad for his Look Magazine article, "India." He was presented with the Achievement Award by the Capitol Press Club of Washington DC in 1965.

He served as Chief Editor of Publications for the Exxon Corporation from 1975 until 1990, when he retired.

Dunbar was also associate editor of "The World at 10," a nightly news program on the New York educational channel WNDT that went on the air in 1962.

In 2014, he was posthumously selected for the NABJ's Hall of Fame.

== Personal life ==
Dunbar was married to Dorothy, also a native of Philadelphia and a journalism graduate of Temple University, and had several children. He died in Manhattan.
