= Karen Attiah =

American writer and editor (born 1986)

- Attiah at Politics and Prose in 2026
- Born: August 12, 1986 (age 40); Texas, U.S.
- Education: Northwestern University (BA); Columbia University (MIA)
- Occupations: Columnist, editor, pundit

Karen Attiah (born August 12, 1986) is an American writer, commentator, and editor, formerly employed by The Washington Post. Hired in 2014, she was the founding editor in 2016 for its Global Opinions section, and was elevated to Opinions columnist in 2021. She was fired by the Post in 2025 in response to her social media comments referencing Charlie Kirk in the aftermath of his assassination. This firing was later overturned in arbitration.

Attiah had recruited Saudi writer Jamal Khashoggi for the Post's Global Opinions section, and her journalistic responses once he went missing on October 2, 2018, after entering the Saudi embassy in Istanbul, led to her to be named 2019 Journalist of the Year by the National Association of Black Journalists. She and her colleague David Ignatius also received the 2019 George Polk Award in Journalism for their work surrounding Khashoggi's assassination.

== Early life ==
Attiah was born in northeastern Texas on August 12, 1986, to a Nigerian-Ghanaian mother and Ghanaian father. (Note: For her birthdate, see also Attiah, Karen [@karenattiah]; (August 12, 2025). "It's my birthday, and as a Ghanaian Tuesday born (Abena), it's a special one— my literal birth-day. I'm a Leo so I love a photoshoot. 😈" – via Instagram.) Her father was a pulmonologist. (Note: See also Attiah, Karen [@KarenAttiah] (April 4, 2020). "I told my dad, a retired critical care doctor/pulmonologist, who spent his career working with ventilators, about @elonmusk's donation of 'ventilators' that turned out to be BiPaP/CPAP machines... Dad: 'Those aren't ventilators!!!' Proceeds to laugh on the phone. 🙃" (Tweet) – via Twitter.) After graduating with a bachelor's degree in communication studies with a minor in African studies from Northwestern University, Attiah won a Fulbright Scholarship to study in Accra, Ghana. In 2012, she earned a master's degree in international affairs from Columbia University's School of International and Public Affairs.

== Career ==
After graduate school, Attiah became a media consultant for the World Bank's Africa program and worked as a freelance reporter for the Associated Press while based in Curaçao. She was hired by The Washington Post in 2014. In 2016, she became the founding editor for the Post's Global Opinions section and was promoted to the role of Opinions columnist in 2021. Her writing at the Post focused on race, gender, culture, human rights, and international affairs. She also hosted TL;DR, a Post video series focusing on identity and global issues, which won the National Association of Black Journalists' Salute to Excellence Award for digital commentary in 2018.

Attiah became the focus of international attention in October 2018 when Saudi writer Jamal Khashoggi, a columnist she had recruited for The Washington Post's Global Opinions section, went missing on October 2 after entering the Saudi embassy in Istanbul. In an interview in Marie Claire, Attiah said her WhatsApp was suddenly flooded with "Jamal's missing" messages after his disappearance, and she "started to fear the worst". On October 5, Washington Post Global Opinions let Khashoggi's usual column space in its print edition remain blank. She was interviewed by major news outlets as the primary contact for Khashoggi's last published opinion, and began writing about his death, advocating for its investigation. Attiah later turned this work into a book about Khashoggi called Say Your Word, Then Leave, which remains unreleased.

Outside of her work at The Washington Post, in March 2024, Attiah became an adjunct professor at her alma mater, Columbia's School of International and Public Affairs. In 2025, Columbia canceled her course "Race, Media, and International Affairs 101". Attiah attributed the decision to Columbia "pre-emptively cav[ing] to pressure", citing it alongside their placement of the Middle Eastern, South Asian, and African Studies department under receivership after demands from the Trump administration. Attiah instead hosted the course online, calling it Resistance Summer School. Attiah said the course's 500 seats were filled within 48 hours of her announcement, and more than 3,000 people remained on the waitlist.

=== Double standards in Western media ===
During her tenure as editor at the Post, Attiah wrote a series of columns lampooning the disparate vocabulary that Western media use to describe events in the United States versus other countries. In her 2020 column "How Western media would cover Minneapolis if it happened in another country", she described the murder of George Floyd as "ethnic violence" occurring under the "Trump regime", borrowing language that Western media had long used to describe similar situations in other countries but were largely unwilling to apply to the United States. In an interview with On the Media, Attiah said she had been inspired by her own experience as a foreign correspondent with the Associated Press covering Nigeria and the Caribbean, and by Trevor Noah's comparison of Trump to an African dictator. The interview noted a parallel between Trump's suggestion of treating COVID-19 infection by injecting disinfectants and Gambian president Yahya Jammeh's program of treating HIV/AIDS with herbs.

Previously, Attiah had penned "How Western media would cover Baltimore if it happened elsewhere", in which she opened her description of the 2015 Baltimore protests with "International leaders expressed concern over the rising tide of racism and state violence in America, especially concerning the treatment of ethnic minorities in the country and the corruption in state security forces around the country when handling cases of police brutality". In a subsequent interview about her Baltimore article, Attiah brought up the previous year's Ferguson protests and noted that "Ferguson was the first time that Amnesty International deployed a human rights abuses team inside the U.S. to document the unrest. That's how bad it was. Journalists being tear gassed and arrested. Cameras being dismantled, no-fly zones for news helicopters ... I mean it was shocking. That was a huge wakeup call." Referring to the recent Gezi Park protests in Turkey, she asked,

Why did we call those in other countries brave people agitating for freedom when those in the U.S. that march for justice and accountability are thugs/rioters? We also romanticize these events in faraway lands but seem to have a much harder time with our own social justice movements here at home. Even those here that followed the protests in Turkey against repression and media crackdowns lauded the protesters, I remember, and how social media played a role. But what about our own?

Other columns in the series include "How Western media would cover the U.S. election if it happened in another country" and "How Western media would have covered the storming of the U.S. Capitol if it had happened in another country", written in response to the former British colony's struggle to execute a peaceful transfer of power after its troubled 2020 federal elections.

=== The Washington Post termination ===
Attiah announced in a newsletter on September 15, 2025, that she had been fired by The Washington Post. (Note: For her newsletter post, see Attiah, Karen (September 15, 2025). "The Washington Post Fired Me — But My Voice Will Not Be Silenced". The Golden Hour by Karen Attiah.) According to the termination letter Attiah received from the Post via email, her "public comments regarding the death of Charlie Kirk violate The Post's social media policies" and constituted "gross misconduct".

The termination letter specifically quotes two posts on the social media platform Bluesky in which she wrote, "Refusing to tear my clothes and smear ashes on my face in performative mourning for a white man that espoused violence is...not the same as violence" and "Part of what keeps America so violent is the insistence that people perform care, empty goodness and absolution for white men who espouse hatred and violence."

Attiah's only recent direct social media reference to Kirk was a Bluesky post paraphrasing Kirk's comments from 2023 that Sheila Jackson Lee, Michelle Obama, Ketanji Brown Jackson, and Joy Reid "do not have the brain processing power to otherwise be taken really seriously", and that they "had to go steal a white person's slot to go be taken somewhat seriously". Some have since challenged the phrasing of her remarks, claiming she intentionally suggested he was referring to all Black women when he had referred specifically to the aforementioned four.

Attiah's statements regarding her firing were reported by a variety of news organizations. According to the Poynter Institute, "it did not appear that it was that post, or any one specific post, that led to her firing." The New York Times noted that her posts did not celebrate Kirk's killing. The Independent and The Guardian also noted that Attiah's job may have already been in danger due to confrontations with Post opinion editor Adam O'Neal, who had reportedly offered buyouts to columnists whose work was not aligned with the opinion section's conservative shift announced in 2025. Attiah was the Post's last remaining Black full-time opinion columnist prior to her termination.

In her newsletter Attiah wrote, "As a columnist, I used my voice to defend freedom and democracy, challenge power and reflect on culture and politics with honesty and conviction. Now, I am the one being silenced—for doing my job." According to Attiah, the Post failed to initiate a conversation about her conduct before the decision to fire her via email.

The Washington Post Guild, the newspaper's editorial employee union, condemned her firing. Following her termination Attiah filed a grievance with the Post, through the Post's labor union, arguing that her social media comments were well-supported within her purview as an opinion writer and permissible under the company's social media policy and labor agreement. The Post declined to comment on her firing, directing reporters instead to their employee social media use standards.

A year later, an arbitrator determined that The Washington Post did not have "good and sufficient cause" to terminate Attiah, and the Post was ordered to rehire her and to compensate her with back pay. In her ruling on August 24, 2026, arbitrator Sarah Miller Espinosa stated that firing Attiah was "absolutely disproportional", noting in her conclusion "The Post's rushed decision to terminate the Grievant approximately four hours after O'Neal became aware of the Grievant's posts". On November 8, Attiah announced she had decided not to return to her job at The Washington Post because it "meant coming back without the guaranteed freedom and institutional support to do what I loved: use my voice, seek truth, and serve readers".

== Honors ==
- National Association of Black Journalists Salute to Excellence Award in Digital Commentary for TL;DR with Karen Attiah, 2018.
- George Polk Award, shared with David Ignatius, for their reporting and advocacy around Khashoggi's assassination, 2019.
- National Association of Black Journalists Journalist of the Year Award, 2019.
- Washingtonian Star to Watch Award, 2021.
