= Pierre Thomas (journalist) =

American journalist

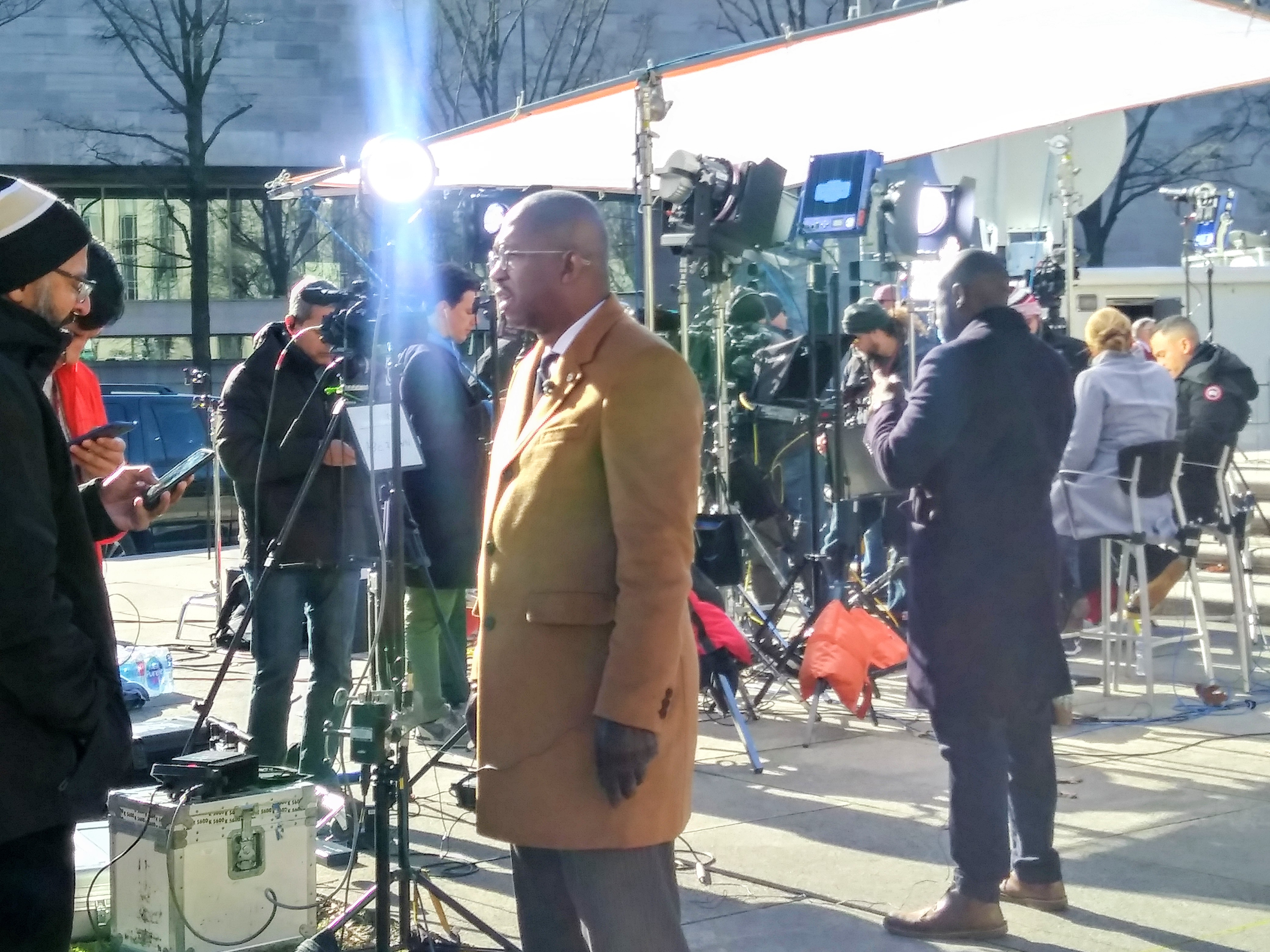
- Thomas in 2018
- Employer: ABC News
- Awards: Emmy, Peabody Award, Dupont Award

Pierre Thomas is an American journalist. He serves as senior justice correspondent at ABC News. He has twice won an Emmy, as well as winning a Peabody Award and Dupont Award and been named “Journalist of the Year” by the National Association of Black Journalists.

== Early life ==
Thomas was born in 1962 in Lynchburg, Virginia, and grew up in Monroe, Virginia, the fifth and youngest child of Nathaniel Thomas and Bertha Helen Brown Thomas. Thomas graduated from Amherst County High School in 1980, and enrolled in Virginia Tech, graduating in 1984 with a degree in communication studies. As a student, his curriculum included an internship with the university's radio station, WVTF, in nearby Roanoke, Virginia.

== Career ==
Thomas began his career at The Roanoke Times and World-News. He moved to The Washington Post in 1987, where he worked for ten years and was mentored by Ben Bradlee. Thomas later moved to television with a job at CNN in 1997, where he worked as justice correspondent. Thomas joined ABC News in 2000.

== Awards ==
In 2001, Thomas and the ABC News team won Emmy, Peabody and DuPont awards for their coverage of the events of September 11, 2001. He and the ABC News team won an Emmy again in 2009 for their coverage of the inauguration of President Obama.

In 2012, the National Association of Black Journalists named Thomas "Journalist of the Year," particularly citing his accomplishments in accurately reporting the shooting of U.S. Representative Gabby Giffords (while other networks erroneously reported she had died) as well as breaking stories around the death of Osama bin Laden.

In 2015, Thomas won the Radio Television Digital News Association's John F. Hogan Distinguished Service award for "contributions to journalism and freedom of the press."
