= Bob Ray Sanders =

American journalist

- Born: Bob Ray Sanders; 1947 (age 78–79); Fort Worth, Texas
- Education: I.M. Terrell High School; University of North Texas
- Occupations: Journalist on-air presenter
- Website: bobraysanders.com

Bob Ray Sanders (born April 2, 1947) is a journalist and Civil rights leader. In 2015, he left the Fort Worth Star-Telegram, where he started his professional career, as associate editor and senior columnist.

== Early life ==
Sanders was born and grew up on the east side of Fort Worth’s downtown. He is the youngest of his parents' 11 children. He attended I.M. Terrell High School and graduated in 1965.

In 1969, Sanders graduated from the University of North Texas (then North Texas State University) and was later inducted into the Shuford Hall of Honor.

== Career ==
In 1972, Sanders became a reporter for KERA-TV. Eventually, he later served as manager of KERA Radio, vice president/station manager of KERA-TV, and host and producer of the station's award-winning program, News Addition.

In 1969, he was hired by the Fort Worth Star-Telegram, after he graduated from college.

Sanders was also a narrator in the Malcolm X documentary, Malcolm X: An Overwhelming Influence on the Black Power Movement.

In December 2018, Bob Ray Sanders was appointed as one of the four co-chairs of Fort Worth's Race and Culture Task Force.

== Personal life ==
Sanders is married to Dorothy Brown-Sanders and the couple has a son, Chandon.

== Honors ==
Sanders is a Fort Worth Independent School District honoree.

In 2018, he was inducted into the hall of fame for black journalists by the National Association of Black Journalists.

In 2011, he was nominated for a Pulitzer Prize.
