= Allison Davis (television executive) =

American television executive

Allison Jeanne Davis (born April 7, 1953) is an American television and non-profit executive.

Davis was born in New York, New York. After graduating from Boston University with a journalism degree in 1975, Davis began working at WBZ-TV. She was a founding member of the National Association of Black Journalists.

She rose through the ranks in news, becoming an on air reporter at KDKA-TV in Pittsburgh, a writer-producer at NBC, helped launch MSNBC and from 1998 to 2004, Davis served as senior vice president/creative of CBS and Dunbar Productions.

In the nonprofit world, Davis was vice president, chief operating officer, and special assistant to the Jackie Robinson Foundation's chief executive from 2004 to 2009.
