= Afro-Academic, Cultural, Technological and Scientific Olympics =

Youth program of the NAACP

The Afro-Academic, Cultural, Technological and Scientific Olympics (ACT-SO), informally named the "Olympics of the Mind," is a youth program of the NAACP that is "designed to recruit, stimulate, improve and encourage high academic and cultural achievement among African American high school students." The year-long program recognizes and awards young people who have demonstrated academic and cultural achievement. Gold, silver, and bronze medals, along with cash awards, are awarded to winners in each of 29 categories of competition in the sciences, humanities, business, performing and visual arts, and local and national entrepreneurship/ culinary competitions. Active in nearly 400 cities, ACT-SO is the largest academic promotion for black youth in America.

== History ==
ACT-SO was founded in 1978 by author and journalist Vernon Jarrett (1918-2004). The program was intended to give recognition to young people who could demonstrate academic, scientific, and artistic achievement, allowing young people to gain recognition equal to that often achieved by entertainers and athletes. The first national ACT-SO competition was held in 1978 in Portland, Oregon.

Since its inception, almost 300,000 young people have participated in the program, and more than 700 gold medals have been awarded to youths around the United States. Over $350,000 has been granted in monetary awards, scholarships, and laptop computers.

=== Historical timeline ===
1976: Vernon Jarrett presented his concept for ACT-SO, an "Olympics of the Mind", to the DuSable Museum of African American History in Chicago. It was later decided that the program would better serve youth nationally rather than just in the Chicago area.

1977: Jarrett approached NAACP Executive Director Dr. Benjamin Hooks, who was responsive to the idea of ACT-SO and approached the NAACP National Board of Directors. The board adopted a resolution to accept ACT-SO as an officially sponsored NAACP youth achievement program. Local NAACP branches would be called upon to sponsor ACT-SO, conduct local competitions annually, and then take local gold medalists to an annual national ACT-SO competition.

1978: The first National ACT-SO competition was held in Portland, Oregon with seven cities participating: Atlanta, Baltimore, Chicago, Kansas City, Los Angeles, New Orleans, and St. Louis.

1980: Barbara Coggins, one of Vernon Jarrett's colleagues, was hired as the first National ACT-SO Director and designed a structural framework for establishing and running ACT-SO programs across the country.

1991: The NAACP Board of Directors created its own ACT-SO committee.

2004: Jarrett died of cancer at the age of 82.

Today, ACT-SO sustains approximately 200 programs nationally. Over the past 30 years, over 200,000 black high school students have participated in the program at local and national levels.

== Mission ==
For over thirty years the mission of ACT-SO has been to prepare, recognize and reward youth of African descent who exemplify scholastic and artistic excellence.

Original goals (1977):

- To encourage and recognize academic achievement of African American students.
- To promote excellence and highlight academic achievement as well as support the accomplishments of these students.
- To encourage communities to become involved in working as partners in the quest for scholastic achievement by serving as mentors, fundraisers, sponsors, and organizers.

According to the NAACP, the program’s goals are:

- To mobilize the adult community for the promotion of classroom and after-school excellence
- To recognize academic achievement among youth on par with the recognition awarded athletics
- To provide and assist students with the necessary skills and tools to establish goals and acquire the confidence and training to make a successful contribution to society

== Participation Eligibility ==
Annual academic competitions are conducted for students of African descent who are U.S. citizens enrolled in grades 9–12 and are amateurs in the competition categories. Winners of the competition at each local branch are eligible for awards at the finals during the NAACP national convention, which occurs every July. The 114th national competition was held in Boston, Massachusetts, in 2023. The latest 115th national competition was held in 2024 and took place from July 10 to 14, in Las Vegas, Nevada.

== Competition Categories ==
Students can select up to 3 categories to compete in from a total of 29 offerings:

- STEM (Science, Technology, Engineering, & Math):
  - Architecture
  - Biology/Microbiology
  - Chemistry/Biochemistry
  - Computer Science
  - Earth and Space Sciences
  - Engineering
  - Mathematics
  - Medicine and Health
  - Physics
- HUMANITIES:
  - Music Composition
  - Original Essay
  - Playwriting
  - Poetry (Written)
  - Short Story
- THE PERFORMING ARTS:
  - Dance
  - Dramatics
  - Music Instrumental (Classical)
  - Music Instrumental (Contemporary)
  - Music Vocal (Classical)
  - Music Vocal (Contemporary)
  - Oratory
  - Poetry (Performance)
- THE VISUAL ARTS:
  - Drawing
  - Filmmaking
  - Painting
  - Photography
  - Sculpture
- BUSINESS:
  - Entrepreneurship
- CULINARY:
  - Culinary Arts

== Awards ==
Gold, silver, and bronze medals, along with cash awards, are awarded to winners in each of 29 categories of competition. Competition winners receive medals and prizes provided by local and regional sponsors and contributors. Local Gold Medalists advance to the National Competition and compete against more than 800-900 gold medalists representing approximately 200 NAACP Branches nationwide and have the opportunity to receive scholarships and other rewards provided by national sponsors.

- Gold medalists: $2,000
- Silver medalists: $1,500
- Bronze medalists: $1,000

== Sponsors ==
ACT-SO is sponsored by the National Association for the Advancement of Colored People (NAACP), which is the nation's oldest and largest civil rights organization. ACT-SO receives support from schools, community organizations, churches, foundations, local businesses, major corporations and individuals.

The ACT-SO program has many corporate sponsorships from major American corporations, including McDonald's, UPS, Walmart, State Farm, The Walt Disney Company, Comcast, Hyundai, and others.

== Notable ACT-SO alumni ==
- Anthony Anderson
- Michael Beach
- Tananarive Due
- Edwina Findley-Dickerson
- Nicole Heaston
- Lauryn Hill
- Jennifer Hudson
- Mae Jemison
- Alicia Keys
- Jada Pinkett-Smith
- Justin Simien
- John Singleton
- Cornelius Smith Jr.
- Kanye West
- Michelle Williams
- Amber Stroud

Paula Dione Ingram
