= Joel Dreyfuss =

Journalist and magazine editor (born 1945)

Joel Philippe Dreyfuss
- Born: September 1, 1945 (age 80); Port-au-Prince, Haiti
- Education: B.S., City College of New York (1971); Urban Journalism Fellow, University of Chicago
- Occupations: Journalist, editor, author, musician
- Years active: 1970s–present
- Organizations: Council on Foreign Relations, ASME, The Haitian Roundtable
- Known for: Co-founder of NABJ; editor roles at The Root, Red Herring, Fortune, PC Magazine; columnist at The Washington Post
- Spouse: Veronica Pollard
- Awards: Overseas Press Club Award, NABJ Hall of Fame, Townsend Harris Medal

Joel Dreyfuss (born September 1945) is a Haitian-American journalist, editor, and author whose active career has spanned over five decades across print, broadcast, and digital media in the United States and internationally. He has held senior editorial positions at major publications including The Washington Post, Fortune, Red Herring, and Bloomberg Markets, and has reported from cities including New York, San Francisco, Tokyo, and Paris.

== Career ==
Dreyfuss co-founded the National Association of Black Journalists and was a Pulitzer Prize juror in 1981.

Over his extensive career, he worked in reporting and senior editorial roles at the Associated Press, The Washington Post, USA Today, and The New York Post, as well as serving as a news producer for KPIX-TV and on-air contributor for KQED-FM’s Newsroom and WNET’s 51st State.

He held leadership positions at several major magazines and technology publications, serving as:

- Editor-in-chief: Red Herring and Information Week
- Editor: PC Magazine
- Executive editor: Black Enterprise
- Managing editor: The Root
- Editor-in-chief: Urban Box Office (media startup)

At Fortune, he served two tenures, first as associate editor and Tokyo bureau chief, and later as senior editor and personal technology columnist. He was also a senior writer for Bloomberg Markets magazine.

Dreyfuss co-authored the book The Bakke Case: The Politics of Inequality (1979) (1979), and his writing has appeared in numerous anthologies, including The Butterfly’s Way, edited by Edwidge Danticat. He is also credited with writing Simon’s New Song, an award-winning animated children’s film.

From 2016 to 2018, Dreyfuss was a contributing columnist for The Washington Post’s Global Opinions section.

He has contributed to The New York Times Magazine and Travel sections, and has written for Politico. His commentary has focused on international affairs, Haiti, French politics, race, and media criticism.

Dreyfuss has won several journalism awards, including one from the Overseas Press Club. He was inducted into the Hall of Fame of the National Association of Black Journalists, and he has received the Townsend Harris Medal, the highest alumni honor awarded by the City College of New York.

He has been a member of the Council on Foreign Relations since 1983.

== Personal life ==
Dreyfuss was born in September 1945 in Port-au-Prince, Haiti, and raised in Monrovia (Liberia), Paris, and New York City. He earned a Bachelor of Science degree from City College of New York in 1971, where he later received the Townsend Harris Medal and was inducted into the Communications Alumni Hall of Fame. He was also an Urban Journalism Fellow at the University of Chicago.

He has lived in multiple cities throughout his life and career, including Chicago, Washington D.C., San Francisco, and Tokyo. He currently divides his time between New York and Paris, where he has continued work on a book chronicling his family’s 300-year relationship with Haiti.

Dreyfuss is married to Veronica Pollard. He is also a musician and has played bass on several albums.

== Selected works ==
=== Books ===
- The Bakke Case: The Politics of Inequality (with Charles R. Lawrence III), Harcourt Brace Jovanovich, 1979.

=== Film ===
- Simon’s New Song, animated children’s film (Nguzo Saba Productions) – award-winning.

=== Anthologies ===
- Contributed essays to The Butterfly’s Way: Voices from the Haitian Diaspora in the United States, ed. Edwidge Danticat (Soho Press, 2001).

=== Albums ===
- King Nando Shing-a-ling - with King Nando and his Orchestra
- King Nando El Solitario (The Loner)
- Gerald Merceron: Haiti Insolite Kako 1915

=== Columns & Commentary ===
- Regular contributor to The Washington Post Global Opinions (2016–2018), writing on race, Haiti, international politics, and media.
