= J. C. Hayward =

American journalist

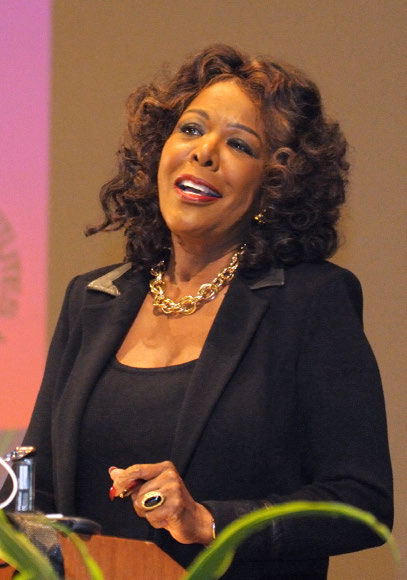
- Hayward speaks at the National Institutes of Health’s African-American History Month observance in 2012
- Born: October 23, 1945 (age 80); East Orange, New Jersey
- Citizenship: United States
- Education: Howard University, Southeastern University
- Occupation: Journalist
- Years active: 43 years (1972–2015)
- Employer: WUSA9
- Known for: First woman to anchor news cast, Charter school scandal
- Awards: NABJ Hall of Fame Honoree, "Washingtonian of the Year", local Emmys, International Film Festival Finalist, Board of Governors Award

J. C. Hayward (born October 23, 1945), also known as Jacqueline Hayward Wilson, is an American news anchor who worked for WUSA9 in Washington, D.C. She is best known for being the first female news anchor in Washington, D.C., and the first African American female news presenter.

== Personal life ==
Jacqueline Hayward Wilson, better known as J. C. Hayward, was born on October 23, 1945, in East Orange, New Jersey. She is a graduate of Howard University with joint degrees in English and Spanish. She has also received two honorary doctorate degrees from both Howard University and Southeastern University. In 1972, Hayward began working at WUSA9 as a news anchor and stayed there until her retirement in 2015.

In 2012, Hayward was diagnosed with stage two breast cancer. and only a week after the diagnosis, the tumour was removed and she was declared cancer-free.

In 2013, J. C. Hayward was named in a lawsuit with Options Public Charter School. J. C. Hayward retired from WUSA9 in 2015 after these allegations were made but later in the same year she was dismissed from this lawsuit and freed of the allegations. J. C. Hayward now resides in Fort Lauderdale, Florida, for the majority of the year.

== Career with WUSA9 ==
J. C. Hayward began working for WUSA9 as a news anchor in 1973. While working for WUSA9, Hayward was credited with being the first female news anchor in Washington, D.C. At work, people talked very highly of Hayward, they said she knew when to be serious but also knew when to have fun. Hayward was very involved with the community which lead to the community being loyal to her and the station. Along with anchoring on WUSA9 News Now at Noon, Hayward also produced 'JC and Friends' J. C. Hayward was also the vice-president for media outreach for the station.

In 2013, Hayward was suspended from the air after being named in a Charter school lawsuit. She was put on leave from the station during further investigation. Shortly after, in 2015, after nearly 43 years of working at WUSA9, J. C. Hayward announced her retirement following the allegations.

== Notable works of journalism ==
J. C. Hayward has had the honor to work with many notable guests throughout her career. In her lifetime, Hayward had the opportunity to sit down and interview extraordinary people including, Maya Angelou, Luciano Pavarotti, and First Lady Nancy Reagan. Alongside these interviews, Hayward also covered big events during her era, for example J. C. was able to cover the story of when South African President Nelson Mandela visited the United States. While Mandela was visiting, she also got to do an exclusive interview with him. Hayward was also a co-host for "Every Women," a daily talk show on Channel 9. During Black History Month, she did segments such as "Nine Who Care" to honor volunteers in the community, and "Nine Amazing Kids" to highlight local children.

== Options Charter School ==
J. C. Hayward is also known for being involved in a scandal with Options Charter School. In 2013, Hayward was named in a lawsuit as one of five people who helped create for-profit companies that were tied with Options Public Charter School. Hayward, being a chairwoman for Options, was paid $8,500 for attending board meetings where she signed contracts to provide funds for Exceptional Education Services, (EES). In 2015, Hayward was dismissed from the charges but she paid the $8,500 that she had received back to the school.

== Impact ==
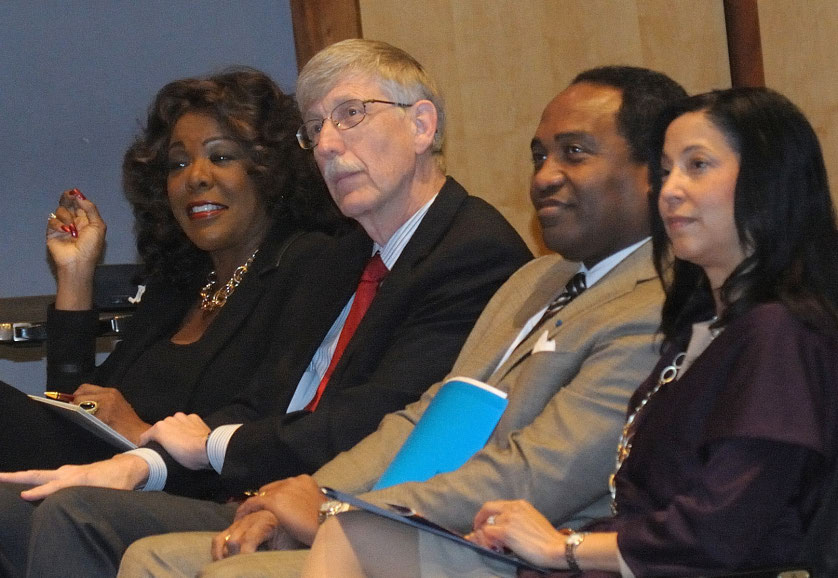
Left to right, Hayward, with Francis Collins, Griffin Rodgers, Janine Austin Clayton at NIH African-American History Month observance in 2012.

J. C. Hayward has had a lasting impact in the news industry. Female news anchors were rare when Hayward assumed her position.

She was involved in community organizations and projects, for example she was the Chairman of the Board of Trustees for Options Public Charter School. She was also a board member of Perry Center, Hospice Caring, Double Nickels, Legal Defense Fund of NAACP, Summer Opera Theatre Company, and United Black Fund. Hayward also supported the Boys and Girls Club of Greater Washington. In 2012, she also served as the Gala Chair for Arena Stage.

After battling breast cancer, Hayward encouraged more African-American women to get mammograms.

== Awards ==
Throughout her career, J. C. Hayward received numerous awards and accolades for her work. In 1972, Hayward received two local Emmy's for her documentary 'Sahel: The Border of Hell'. In 1976, Hayward was presented another local Emmy for Best Newscaster. In 1980, she earned a Bronze Medal from the International Film Festival for her documentary 'We Shall Return'. After interviewing boxer Riddick Bowe, Hayward received yet another local Emmy in 1994. In 1995, she was nominated and received the Board of Governor's Award along with another local Emmy for "truly outstanding achievement and unique accomplishment of duration and durability." In 2000, Hayward was inducted into the Journalism Hall of Fame by the Society of Professional Journalists. In 2007, Hayward was awarded her final local Emmy in the category of Outstanding Community Affairs. Along with all of the local Emmy's, Hayward was also one awarded "Washingtonian of the Year." In 2011, J. C. Hayward was inducted into the National Association of Black Journalists Hall of Fame.

== See also ==
- National Association of Black Journalists Hall of Fame
