= Clarence Williams (photojournalist) =

American photojournalist

Clarence J. Williams (January 22, 1967) is an American photojournalist who worked for the Los Angeles Times from 1996 to 2003. He won the Pulitzer Prize in 1998 for feature photography.

== Biography ==
Born in 1967 in Philadelphia, Pennsylvania, Williams received his Bachelor of Arts degree from Temple University in 1992.

He began his career working as a photographic intern for the Philadelphia Tribune in 1992, and also interned with the York Daily Record, and with the Los Angeles Times in 1994. He then worked as a staff photographer at the Reston Times Community Newspapers, before being hired as a staff photographer for the Los Angeles Times in 1996.

== Pulitzer Prize ==
In 1998, Williams won the Pulitzer Prize for his "powerful images documenting the plight of young children with parents addicted to alcohol and drugs". Controversy arose "over the idea of the non-intrusiveness of a journalist or a photographer capturing a story and the need to intervene in the lives of children at risk". Children who were photographed in Williams' series, were taken into protective services after publication of his photos.

== Awards ==
Williams won the Pulitzer Prize, the National Headliner Award, National Press Photographers Association Award, Pictures of the Year Contest (First Place, Newspaper Issue Reporting, 1997), the National Press Photographers Association National Monthly Clip Contest, and the National Association of Black Journalists Journalist of the Year award (1998).

== Professional organizations ==
Williams is a member of the National Association of Black Journalists and the National Press Photographers Association.
