= Adam O'Neal =

American journalist

Adam O'Neal (born 1991 or 1992) is an American journalist. In June 2025, he was named as The Washington Post's next opinion editor after owner Jeff Bezos announced that the paper would promote "personal liberties and free markets." O'Neal had previously worked as a correspondent for The Economist and an editorialist for The Wall Street Journal.

The day after the September 2025 assassination of Charlie Kirk, O’Neal initiated the firing of Washington Post columnist Karen Attiah for social media posts in which she stated that she refused “to tear my clothes and smear ashes on my face in performative mourning” for Kirk. O’Neal declared that Attiah’s “social media feed yesterday and today is beyond the pale, completely unacceptable for someone associated with Opinions.” In August 2026, a private arbitrator ruled that the newspaper “did not have good and sufficient cause” to fire Attiah and ordered that she be rehired.

On July 31, 2026, O'Neal announced his resignation from The Washington Post, effective August 31. He did not state a reason for his departure.
