= Max Robinson =

American journalist (1939–1988)

- Robinson on ABC World News Tonight, 1979.
- Born: Maxie Cleveland Robinson Jr. May 1, 1939; Richmond, Virginia, U.S.
- Died: December 20, 1988 (aged 49); Washington, D.C., U.S.
- Cause of death: Complications from AIDS
- Resting place: Lincoln Memorial Cemetery; Suitland, Maryland, U.S.
- Education: Indiana University Bloomington; Oberlin College; Virginia Union University
- Occupation: Television journalist
- Years active: 1959–1985
- Notable credit(s): First African–American broadcast news anchor, ABC World News Tonight.
- Spouses: Eleanor Booker (m. 1963; div. 1968) Hazel O'Leary (m. 1974; ann. 1975) Beverly Hamilton (m. 1977; div. 1985)
- Children: 4
- Family: Randall Robinson (brother)

Maxie Cleveland Robinson Jr. (May 1, 1939 – December 20, 1988) was an American broadcast journalist, most notably serving as co-anchor on ABC World News Tonight alongside Frank Reynolds and Peter Jennings from 1978 until 1983. Robinson is noted as the first African-American broadcast network news anchor in the United States. Robinson was a founder of the National Association of Black Journalists.

== Biography ==
=== Early life and education ===
Robinson was born the second of four children (a sister Jewell, who became a teacher; brother Randall, a Harvard-educated lawyer; and sister Jean, a publicist), of Maxie, a teacher and Doris Robinson in Richmond, Virginia. The schools in Richmond were still segregated when he attended; after graduating from Armstrong High School, Robinson attended Oberlin College, where he was freshman class president. However, he stayed there for only a year and a half and did not graduate. Robinson briefly served in the United States Air Force and was assigned to the Russian Language School at Indiana University Bloomington before receiving a medical discharge. He began working in radio early on, including a short time at WSSV-AM in Petersburg, Virginia, where he called himself "Max the Player", and later at WANT-AM, Richmond.

=== Career ===
Robinson began his television career in 1959, when he was hired for a news job at WTOV-TV in Portsmouth, Virginia. Robinson had to read the news while hidden behind a slide of the station's logo. One night, Robinson had the slide removed; he was fired the next day. He later went to WRC-TV in Washington, DC, and stayed for three years, winning six journalism awards for coverage of civil-rights events such as the riots that followed the 1968 assassination of Dr. Martin Luther King Jr. It was during this time that Robinson won two regional Emmys for a documentary he made on black life in Anacostia entitled The Other Washington. In 1969, Robinson joined the Eyewitness News team at WTOP-TV (now WUSA-TV) in Washington, D.C. Robinson was teamed with anchor Gordon Peterson, becoming the first African-American anchor on a local television news program, and the newscast succeeded. During that time, he was so well-liked by viewers that when Hanafi Muslims took hostages at the B'nai B'rith building in Washington they would speak only with Robinson.

=== ABC News and World News Tonight ===
In 1978, when Roone Arledge was looking to revamp ABC's nightly news broadcast into World News Tonight, he remembered Robinson from a 60 Minutes interview, and hired him to be a part of his new three-anchor format. Robinson would anchor national news from Chicago, while Peter Jennings would anchor international news in London and Frank Reynolds would be the main anchor from Washington. Robinson thus became the first black man to anchor a nightly network news broadcast. The three-man co-anchor team was a ratings success, and launched spoofs regarding how the three would pitch stories to each other during the telecast by saying the other's name: "Frank"..."Max"...."Peter".

Robinson's ABC tenure was marked by conflicts between himself and the management of ABC News over viewpoints and the portrayal of Black America in the news. He was known by his co-workers to show up late for work or sometimes not show up at all; along with his moodiness, his use of alcohol escalated. In addition, Robinson was known to fight racism at any turn and often felt unworthy of the admiration he received and was not pleased with what he had accomplished. Together with Bob Strickland, Robinson established a program for mentoring young black broadcast journalists.

During most of Robinson's tenure, ABC News used the Westar satellite to feed Robinson's segment of WNT from Chicago to New York. TVRO receiver earth stations were also coming into use at the time, and anyone who knew where to find the satellite feeds could view the feed. On the live feed, Robinson could be seen to have a drink or two, but never during the actual aired segment, which led some bars around the country to even have drink specials during the nearly 90 minutes, and invited patrons to come in and see the "Max 'R'" feed. ABC eventually caught on to what was happening, and even resorted to hide what was going on by supering a slide with the words "ABC News Chicago" on the screen during the live feed during times that Robinson was not live over the actual WNT broadcast. In addition, Robinson could often be seen being harsh towards people who worked around him during the live feed. Reynolds died in 1983, and shortly afterward Jennings was named sole anchor of World News Tonight; Robinson was relegated to the weekend anchor post, as well as reading hourly news briefs.

Robinson left ABC in 1983 and joined WMAQ-TV in Chicago in March 1984; he was the station's first black anchor. His tenure with the station was rocky, and he had conflicts with some of his colleagues. He was also frequently absent. He was fired from the network after attending a work-related event and never returning to the office. He had entered a drug treatment program at Hazelden, though allegedly without informing his superiors.

Robinson retired in 1985.

== Personal life ==
=== Marriages ===
Robinson was married three times. Two ended in divorce, one in annulment. His first marriage was to Eleanor Booker from 1963 to 1968 and they had three children: Mark, Maureen, and Michael. His second marriage was to Hazel O'Leary from 1974 to 1975. Robinson's final marriage was to Beverly Hamilton from 1977 to 1986, with whom he had another son, Malik. Robinson was the older brother of Randall Robinson.

=== Health and death ===
Robinson was found to have AIDS while he was hospitalized for pneumonia in Blue Island, Illinois, but he kept it a secret, refusing to discuss it, despite widespread rumors about why his health was deteriorating. In the fall of 1988, Robinson was in Washington to deliver a speech at Howard University's School of Communications when he became increasingly ill. Robinson checked himself into Howard University Hospital where he died of complications due to AIDS on December 20, 1988. He had asked his family to reveal that he had AIDS so that, according to the new reports, "Others in the black community would be alerted to the dangers and the need for treatment and education." He was buried at Lincoln Memorial Cemetery in Suitland, Maryland.

== See also ==
- List of African-Americans
- List of American journalists
- List of people from Chicago
- List of people from Virginia
- List of people from Washington, D.C.
- List of television reporters

Media offices
Preceded by Harry Reasoner and Barbara Walters	ABC World News Tonight anchor 1978–83 with Frank Reynolds and Peter Jennings	Succeeded by Peter Jennings
