= WUSA (TV) =

Television station in Washington, D.C.

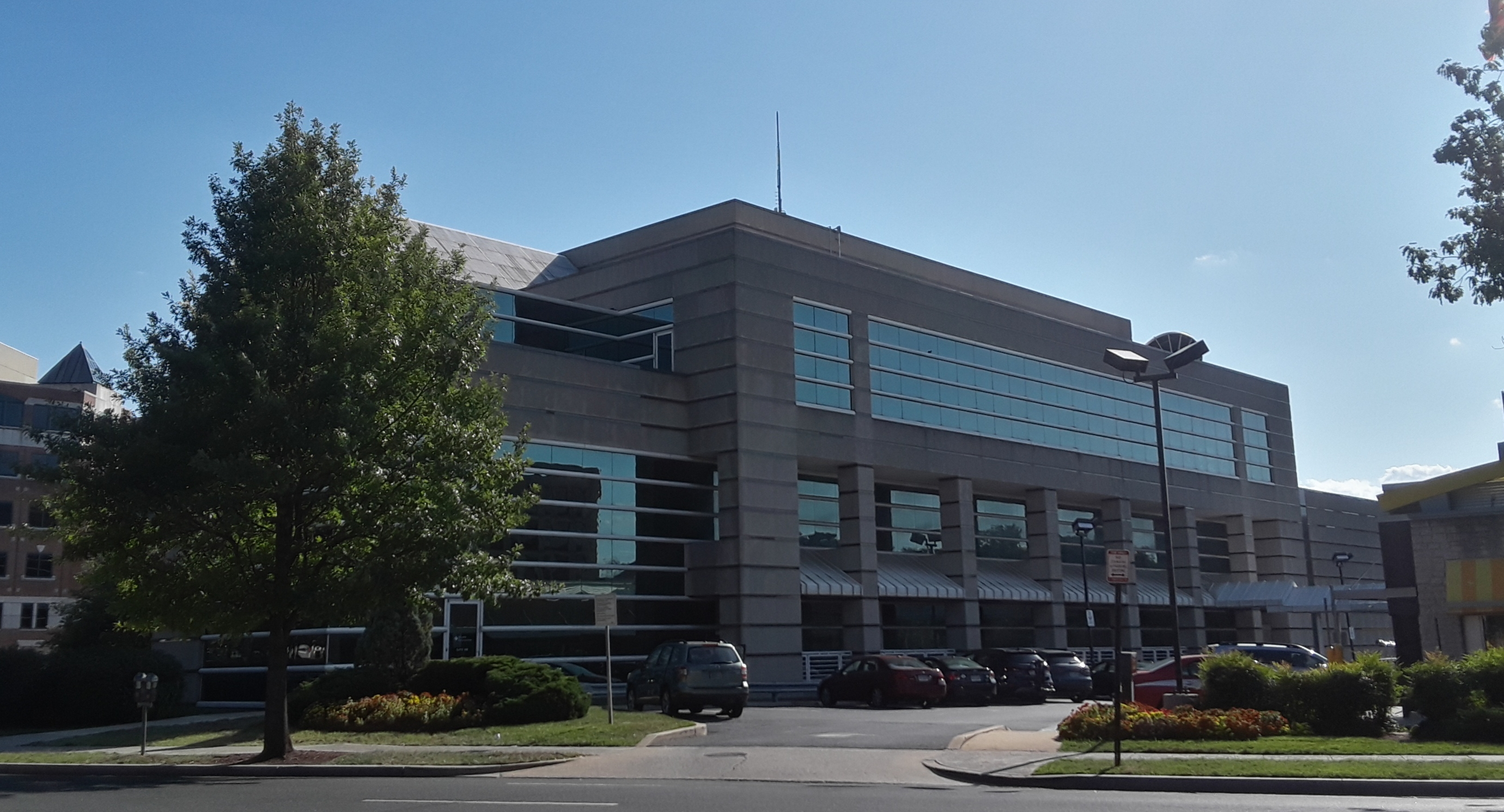
- WUSA's studios in Tenleytown, Washington, D.C.
- Washington, D.C.; United States
- Channels: Digital: 9 (VHF), shared with WJAL; Virtual: 9
- Branding: WUSA 9

Programming
- Affiliations: 9.1: CBS; for others, see § Subchannels

Ownership
- Owner: Tegna Inc., a subsidiary of Nexstar Media Group; (WUSA-TV, Inc.)
- Sister stations: Nexstar: WDCW, WDVM-TV

History
- First air date: January 16, 1949
- Former call signs: WOIC (1949–1950); WTOP-TV (1950–1978); WDVM-TV (1978–1986)
- Former channel numbers: Analog: 9 (VHF, 1949–2009); Digital: 34 (UHF, 1998–2009)
- Call sign meaning: United States of America; USA Today, owned by Gannett (now USA Today Co.), WUSA's former owner

Technical information
- Licensing authority: FCC
- Facility ID: 65593
- ERP: 52 kW
- HAAT: 235.6 m (773 ft)
- Transmitter coordinates: 38°57′1″N 77°4′47″W

Links
- Public license information: Public file; LMS
- Website: www.wusa9.com

WUSA (channel 9) is a television station in Washington, D.C., affiliated with CBS. It is the flagship station of the Tegna subsidiary of Nexstar Media Group; Nexstar also owns independent station WDVM-TV (channel 25) and CW outlet WDCW (channel 50). WUSA's studios and transmitter are based at Broadcast House on Wisconsin Avenue in northwest Washington's Tenleytown neighborhood.

This station began broadcasting as WOIC on January 16, 1949. It was the fourth station on the air in Washington, D.C., and has been affiliated with CBS since its inception. In June 1950, a joint venture of CBS and The Washington Post purchased WOIC from the Bamberger Broadcasting Service, a subsidiary of R. H. Macy and Company. The station changed call signs to WTOP-TV, marking its association with WTOP radio, and moved into new studios—named Broadcast House—in 1954. That same year, The Post became its sole owner. It was the flagship of what became Post-Newsweek Stations until 1978, when it was traded to the Evening News Association amid increasing pressure to clear away newspaper-broadcast cross-ownership conflicts. The trade came with a call sign change to WDVM-TV.

The Gannett Company, headquartered in McLean, Virginia, acquired the Evening News Association in 1985. WDVM-TV was renamed WUSA, reflecting Gannett's ownership of the national newspaper USA Today. A new Broadcast House opened in 1992. Gannett's broadcasting division became Tegna Inc. in 2015 and was merged with Nexstar in 2026.

== History ==
=== Early years (1949–1978) ===
The station first went on the air on January 11, 1949, as WOIC. It began full-time operations on January 16. The fourth-oldest station in the nation's capital, channel 9 was originally owned by the Bamberger Broadcasting Service, a subsidiary of R. H. Macy and Company. Bamberger also owned WOR-AM-FM in New York City, and was working to put WOR-TV on the air at the same time. Nine days later, WOIC broadcast the first televised American presidential inaugural address, given by President Harry S. Truman. WOIC picked up the CBS affiliation upon signing on, replacing WMAL-TV (channel 7, now WJLA-TV) as the network's Washington outlet. WOIC/WTOP/WUSA has been a CBS affiliate since its inception, and is currently the network's longest-tenured affiliate. However, WOR was a shareholder in the Mutual Radio Network, which had plans to enter television. Plans for the proposed Mutual-branded network advanced far enough that, at the annual meeting of Mutual stockholders in April 1950, network president Frank White made an official announcement of the planned creation of a limited five-station Mutual network (Boston, New York, Washington, D.C., Chicago, & Los Angeles). At that same time Mutual radio station KQV in Pittsburgh, which was engaged in an ultimately unsuccessful attempt to get a television license, was reportedly hoping for their station to be a Mutual television affiliate. "Mutual Television Network" ended up being the decided-on branding for the Mutual-branded network. However, the 5-station Mutual network failed in short time. Also, at the start of 1950, Bamberger Broadcasting changed its name to General Teleradio.

In June 1950, a joint venture of CBS and The Washington Post purchased WOIC from Bamberger/Macy's for $1.4 million. The new owners, WTOP Incorporated (the Post owned 55%, with CBS holding the remaining 45% stake), changed the station's call sign to WTOP-TV, after its new sister station WTOP radio (then at 1500 AM). In July 1950, WTOP-TV became the first television station in Washington authorized to broadcast color television in the 405-line field sequential color standard, which was incompatible with the black-and-white 525-line NTSC standard. Color broadcasts continued for nearly 30 months, when regulatory and commercial pressures forced the FCC to rescind its original color standard and begin the process of adopting the 525-line NTSC-3 standard, developed by RCA to be backwards compatible with the existing black-and-white televisions.

In 1954, the WTOP stations moved into a new facility, known as "Broadcast House", at 40th and Brandywine Streets NW in Washington. The building was the first in the country designed as a unified radio and television facility. Its name was in honor of Broadcasting House, home of the BBC in London. The building was well known to WTOP's president, since he had spent much of World War II assigned to the BBC. Previous to the move to Broadcast House, the radio stations operated out of the Earle Building (now the Warner Building, home of the Warner Theatre), and WTOP-TV had operated out of the small WOIC studios at the same location. When Broadcast House was completed and the new television studios were inaugurated, the old studio became the garage for Broadcast House and the old master control room became both the master control and transmitter room for channel 9, since Broadcast House had been built around the station's original, four-sided tower. The building with the tower remains in the middle at the same location, although it is now an office building and retail store front.

The WTOP-TV tower was known in Washington for two things. First, at Christmas time, the tower was strung with Christmas lights and glowed brightly on top of Fort Reno Park, the tallest point in the District of Columbia. Second, the tower tended to sway much more than three-sided towers. In a strong wind, the tower could be seen swaying back-and-forth, and during the winter ice from the tower fell quite often on the streets below.

In October 1954, CBS sold its share of WTOP Inc. to the Washington Post to comply with the FCC's new seven-station-per-group ownership rule. CBS's partial ownership of WTOP radio, KQV radio in Pittsburgh and WCCO radio in Minneapolis exceeded the FCC's limit for AM radio stations. CBS opted to sell its share of WTOP, which it had purchased in whole in 1932 before selling controlling interest to the Post in 1949.

After the sale closed, the Post merged the WTOP stations with its other broadcast property, WMBR-AM-TV in Jacksonville, Florida, and changed the name of the licensee from "WTOP Inc." to "Post Stations, Inc." WMBR radio was sold off in 1958, and WMBR-TV became WJXT. The Post renamed its broadcasting group "Post-Newsweek Stations" in 1961 after the Post bought Newsweek magazine. Post-Newsweek acquired its third television station, WLBW-TV (now WPLG) in Miami in 1970 and in 1974 added WTIC-TV (now WFSB) in Hartford, Connecticut, to the group. In 1972, WTOP-TV joined with the Evening Star Broadcasting Company (owned by the Post's rival, the now-defunct Washington Star and licensee of WMAL-TV) to build the Joint Tower, a 1,040-foot (320 m), three-sided tower across the alley from Broadcast House at 4010 Chesapeake Street NW. Transmission lines were extended from Broadcast House's transmitter area to the new tower for both WTOP-TV and WHUR-FM (the former WTOP-FM, which had been donated by Post-Newsweek to Howard University in 1971). The old tower continued to serve as the backup antenna for channel 9 until the station sold Broadcast House in 1996.

In 1974, WTOP and the other Post-Newsweek stations adopted the slogan "The One and Only". The moniker was part of a trend toward group identification of stations, with each station being "The One and Only Channel (channel number)". Staff members from the "One and Only" period usually refer to themselves as "the one and onlies" as a source of pride. The slogan was dropped from active use in the late 1990s and has not been used as part of an image campaign since 1996. The slogan no longer appears on-air, but was revived in a sense when channel 9 adopted its slogan in the mid-2000s, First and Only with Local News in HDTV.

=== Later years (1978–present) ===
On June 26, 1978, Post-Newsweek exchanged WTOP-TV with the Evening News Association's WWJ-TV (now WDIV-TV) in Detroit. Post-Newsweek parent the Washington Post Company, and the Evening News Association, which published the Detroit News, decided to swap their stations for fear that the FCC would force them to sell the stations at unfavorable terms or revoke their very valuable licenses because the FCC at the time was considering forbidding ownership of newspapers and broadcast stations in the same market. As Post-Newsweek retained WTOP radio and FCC rules in effect at the time disallowed two separately owned stations from sharing the same base call letters, the station changed to WDVM-TV, representing the initials of the areas which it serves: the District of Columbia, Virginia and Maryland.

Logo used from 2000 to January 2013. An earlier variant, which replaced the 1980s-era "square 9", which dated to the days of WDVM, was colored yellow with a black numeral and was used from 1995 to 1998.

In 1985, the Gannett Company purchased the Evening News Association. (Note: By 2005, the Evening News Association had been renamed "Detroit Free Press, Inc.", after that Gannett subsidiary simultaneously bought the Free Press and sold the News. The station's license remained under Detroit Free Press, Inc. until early 2015, shortly before Gannett was split into separate publishing and broadcasting companies.) The WUSA callsign had been in use by Gannett's station in Minneapolis (previously WTCN-TV) for a year, and Gannett offered it to WDVM's management upon taking control of the station. Post television columnist John Carmody noted that the "rather clumsy" WDVM callsign was not often used in promotions. Both stations agreed to the swap; the Minneapolis station became KARE on June 11, 1986, while WDVM became WUSA on Independence Day. The WDVM-TV callsign is now in use on an unrelated station in Hagerstown, Maryland.

Carrying over a practice started by the Minneapolis station, the callsign was depicted in print and on logos as "W★USA" during this time. However, the asterisk or star between the "W" and "U" is not part of the call sign. The star was replaced on-air with the CBS Eye Device, which is also not part of the call sign, by 1998 as CBS began to considerably relax their formerly strict branding guidelines for their affiliates, which had not allowed blending the logo into call letters.

WUSA moved to a new Broadcast House at 4100 Wisconsin Avenue NW in January 1992. WTOP-FM had left the old Broadcast House in 1971, but kept its transmitter there. WTOP radio departed in 1978; the Post had sold it a year earlier to the Outlet Company. The move to the more modern building was tinged with sadness due to the death from a brain tumor of popular sportscaster Glenn Brenner just days beforehand. In 1998, WUSA launched its website, wusatv9.com, but later removed the "TV" reference in the domain name to become wusa9.com.

In 2001, WUSA made the decision to preempt CBS' national coverage of the September 11 attacks with its own local coverage. At 9:41 a.m., just four minutes after the impact, WUSA broke into the CBS national coverage anchored by Dan Rather and showed smoke billowing from the Pentagon. National coverage remained available on multiple Viacom-owned cable networks, including MTV and VH1. Their local coverage, like that of other Washington-area affiliates, included reporters on the phone and on camera, eyewitness accounts, and analysis. WUSA continuously stayed on the air, covering the exodus of the District, school closures, and traffic issues until 12:42 p.m. Throughout the rest of the afternoon, WUSA provided local news updates and press conferences, alternating between their local coverage and the national feed. Washington Post television critic Tom Shales took issue with this decision, writing that "the city was subjected to a CBS blackout by the local affiliate, Gannett-owned Channel 9. The station chose to view this, incredibly enough, as a local story and reported it initially as if it were a winter snow day and school closings were of the utmost importance."

On June 29, 2015, the Gannett Company split in two, with one side specializing in print media and the other side specializing in broadcast and digital media. WUSA was retained by the latter company, named Tegna. Nexstar Media Group, the owner of WDVM-TV and WDCW in the Washington market, acquired Tegna in a deal announced in August 2025 and completed on March 19, 2026. The deal included approval for Nexstar to own three station licenses in markets such as Washington. A temporary restraining order issued one week later by the U.S. District Court for the Eastern District of California, later escalated to a preliminary injunction, has prevented WUSA from being integrated into WDCW and WDVM.

== Programming ==
WTOP was one of the few CBS stations that declined to carry the popular game show The Price Is Right during the early years of the program's run (although ABC affiliate WMAL-TV/WJLA-TV did carry Price and some other CBS daytime game shows uncleared by WTOP during the mid-1970s).

From May 2008 until the end of its original run in 2016, WUSA served as the production studio for the program The McLaughlin Group which was also broadcast on select CBS affiliates (including its New York City owned-and-operated station WCBS-TV) beginning in May 2007 and on some PBS member stations (locally via WETA-TV and WHUT-TV); the show was distributed by WTTW out of Chicago, with the production facilities moved over from NBC owned-and-operated station WRC-TV, where the show had been based since its premiere in 1982.

=== Sports programming ===
Then-WTOP-TV was the first television partner of the Washington Capitals, signing a three-year contract to broadcast 15 road games per year at the team's debut in the 1974–75 NHL season. Warner Wolf did play-by-play for the first season before being replaced by a simulcast of Ron Weber's call for WTOP radio. WTOP-TV treated the games as an afterthought and often relegated them to joins-in-progress or tape-delays to late night. Although Washington Post beat reporter Robert Fachet called the team's state of television affairs "revolting" by the contract's end, station management openly stated they received far more complaints about the preempted CBS shows than from Capitals fans. The Capitals moved to WDCA (channel 20) for 1977. The then-Washington Bullets also signed their first television deal with WTOP-TV when they moved to the city in 1973, concurrent with the start of national broadcasts of the league on CBS. The Bullets moved their local games to WDCA as well in 1977. Additionally, the station aired select weekend Washington Nationals games produced by MASN from 2013 until 2017. In 2024, WUSA and the Washington Commanders announced a partnership, with the network holding exclusive rights to broadcast the team's non-national preseason games.

=== News operation ===
WUSA presently broadcasts 44 hours of locally produced newscasts each week (with 7 hours, 35 minutes each weekday; 3 hours on Saturday; and 3 hours, 5 minutes on Sunday); in addition, the station produces a sports highlight program called Game On!, which airs Sunday evenings after the 11 p.m. newscast. WUSA was the launchpad for several well-known news anchors. Sam Donaldson and Warner Wolf are among WUSA's most successful alumni. Max Robinson was co-anchor of Eyewitness News with Gordon Peterson from 1969 to 1978 before he became the first black anchorman on network television and one of the original anchors of ABC World News Tonight. James Brown of CBS Sports was a sports anchor at the station in the 1980s.

In 1989, WUSA debuted an hour-long newscast at 4 p.m. (replacing The Oprah Winfrey Show, which the station chose not to continue carrying due to the program's licensing fees, it then moved to WJLA-TV), which created a three-hour local news block from 4 to 7 p.m., resulting in a half-hour delay of the CBS Evening News to 7 p.m. The 4 p.m. newscast was dropped in 2000, with WUSA also cutting a half-hour off the end of its 4–7 p.m. news block, moving the CBS Evening News to 6:30 p.m., the recommended timeslot for the network newscast for CBS stations located in the Eastern Time Zone. WUSA was the only major station in the Washington market that did not carry a 4 p.m. newscast until the station revived it in September 2023. As of that date, all four major stations—including WUSA—now air a 4 p.m. newscast.

On May 2, 2005, WUSA became the first television station in the Washington market to begin broadcasting its local newscasts in high definition.

In February 2012, WUSA launched its investigative unit with Chief Investigative Reporter Russ Ptacek. Ptacek's investigations led to reform after uncovering millions in unreported government bonuses, a utility allowed to charge customers during disconnections caused by storms, taxis refusing passengers based upon race, and potentially deadly restaurant food safety risks. Ptacek and WUSA9 parted ways in 2016 when the station announced changes to its investigative direction.

Anchor and consumer correspondent Lesli Foster reported on a petition filed by the Center For Auto Safety asking government safety regulators to recall millions of older model Jeep Grand Cherokees. The consumer group believes the placement of the plastic gas tanks in those vehicles can lead to fires and deaths when they are struck from behind. The gas tank is located behind the rear axle—literally in the crush zone of the vehicle. Chrysler says the vehicles are safe and not defective. The automaker points out that in the 26 fatal accidents cited by NHTSA where they can calculate kinetic energy, the deaths in all those vehicles involved speeds that exceed today's crash test requirements. But the company agreed to recall over 1 million of the remaining 1993–1998 models, along with 2002–2007 Jeep Liberty's back in June of last year. Lesli Foster was acknowledged for her hard hitting investigative report in 2013 with a NCCB-NATAS Emmy Award.

Beginning with the noon newscast on January 17, 2013, WUSA unveiled a new graphics package for the station's newscasts designed for Gannett's news-producing stations by design firm The Mill; the new graphics are designed to reduce on-screen clutter, which viewers complained about prior to the change to the new standardized graphics. With the change, WUSA began using the AFD #10 broadcast flag to present their newscasts in letterboxed widescreen for viewers watching on cable television through 4:3 television sets. Additionally, the station unveiled its new logo, which was stylized as "wusa⋆9", in lower-case lettering.

Beginning with Wake Up Washington on April 26, 2018, WUSA unveiled a new set to replace the previous one used since the May 2, 2005, HD launch, along with a new station logo which ended the use of any stars and/or asterisks in WUSA's branding. It also rolled out a new standardized graphics and music package for the station's newscasts designed for Tegna's news-producing stations.

==== Notable current on-air staff ====
- Kristen Berset – anchor, sports reporter
- Topper Shutt (AMS Seal of Approval) – chief meteorologist

==== Notable former on-air staff ====
- Martin Agronsky – journalist/host of Agronsky and Company (1969–1988)
- Jess Atkinson – sports anchor (2000–2002)
- Ellison Barber – reporter (2015–2017)
- Glenn Brenner – sports anchor and later sports director (1977–1992)
- Anita Brikman – anchor/health reporter (2007–2013)
- James Brown – sports anchor (1984–1990)
- Maureen Bunyan – anchor/reporter (1973–1995)
- Walter Cronkite – Channel 9's first anchorman (1950–1954)
- Chet Curtis – reporter
- Sam Donaldson – anchor/reporter (1961–1967)
- Kristin Fisher – reporter (2009–2013)
- Angie Goff – traffic/entertainment reporter (2007–2011)
- Erica Grow – meteorologist (2012–2015)
- Brett Haber – sports director (2004–2011)
- Darren M. Haynes – sports director (2017–2023)
- J. C. Hayward – anchor (1972–2015)
- Frank Herzog – sports anchor and reporter (1969–1983 and 1992–2004)
- Doug Hill – chief meteorologist (1984–2000)
- Hillary Howard (Statter) – meteorologist (2000–2004)
- Jan Jeffcoat – morning anchor (2013–2018)
- Bruce Johnson – anchor/reporter (1976–2020)
- Susan King – anchor/reporter (1975–1979)
- Doug Llewelyn – anchor/reporter (1970–1976)
- Davey Marlin-Jones – film critic and entertainment reporter (1970–1987)
- Andrea McCarren – anchor/reporter/investigative reporter (1992–1995 and 2009–2018)
- Todd McDermott – anchor (2004–2008)
- Derek McGinty – anchor (2003–2015)
- Andrea Mitchell – reporter (1976–1978)
- Warren Olney – reporter (1966–1969)
- Ralph Penza – reporter (1979–1980)
- Tony Perkins – anchor (2019–2022)
- Gordon Peterson – anchor/reporter (1969–2004)
- Russ Ptacek – investigative reporter (2012–2016)
- Levan Reid – sports reporter/weekend sports anchor (2003–2008)
- Andrea Roane – anchor/reporter (1981–2018)
- Max Robinson – anchor/reporter (1969–1978)
- Monika Samtani – morning traffic reporter (1997–1999 and 2001–2002)
- Bill Shadel – reporter (1950)
- Bob Strickland – anchor/reporter (1969–1996)
- Warner Wolf – sports anchor (1965–1976 and 1992–1996)
- Eun Yang – reporter/anchor (1995–2001)

== Technical information ==
=== Subchannels ===
Subchannels of WUSA and WJAL
License	Subchannel	Res.	Short name	Programming
WUSA	9.1	1080i	WUSA-HD	CBS
WUSA	9.2	480i	Crime	True Crime Network
WUSA	9.3	480i	Quest	Quest
WUSA	9.4	480i	NEST	The Nest
WUSA	9.5	480i	QVC	QVC
WJAL	68.1	720p	AltaVsn	Altavision
WJAL	68.2	480i	DEFY	Defy

On November 1, 2011, WUSA signed an affiliation agreement to add Bounce TV, which launched on WUSA digital subchannel 9.2, on December 16, 2011.

In August 2017, WUSA temporarily stopped carrying its subchannels due to technical considerations involving their channel sharing arrangement with WJAL (virtual channel 68), which moved its signal to WUSA's transmitter on October 1, 2017, and moved its city of license from Hagerstown, Maryland, to Silver Spring. In the interim, Bounce arranged a new affiliation agreement with Univision to be carried on WFDC-DT, and moved its Capital Region affiliation to WFDC-DT4. Justice Network (now True Crime Network) returned later in the month on WUSA-DT2 once the move was completed.

=== Analog-to-digital conversion ===
WUSA stopped transmitting on its analog signal, over VHF channel 9, on June 12, 2009, the official date on which full-power television stations in the United States transitioned from analog to digital broadcasts under federal mandate. The station's digital signal relocated from its pre-transition UHF channel 34 to VHF channel 9 for post-transition operations.

=== Translator ===
- W27EI-D Moorefield, WV
