= Vernon Jarrett =

American journalist (1918–2004)

Vernon Daurice Jarrett (born Daurice Vernon Jarrett; June 19, 1918 (Note: Jarrett's year of birth according to the 1920 United States census, U.S. Social Security Death Index, and the U.S. Social Security Applications and Claims Index is 1918. Conflicting reports of 1921, for instance in Riley, Sam G. (1995). Biographical Dictionary of American Newspaper Columnists. Greenwood. p. 148, are most likely erroneous.) – May 23, 2004) was an African-American journalist who worked in newspaper, television and radio and was an influential commentator on race relations, politics, and African-American history.

== Biography ==
Jarrett was born in Saulsbury, Tennessee; his parents, William and Annie were schoolteachers. He attended Knoxville College in Tennessee on a football scholarship, and graduated with a bachelor's in history and sociology in 1941. He moved to Chicago in 1946 and began his journalism career at the Chicago Defender. In his first assignment for the Defender, he covered a race riot. He also worked for the Associated Negro Press during the 1940s. For three years beginning in 1948 he partnered with composer Oscar Brown, Jr. to produce Negro Newsfront, the first daily radio news broadcast in the United States to be created by African Americans.

Jarrett was the first African American to be a syndicated columnist for the Chicago Tribune, beginning in 1970. During his years at the Tribune, he also was a host on Chicago's ABC-TV station, WLS, where he produced nearly 2,000 television broadcasts. In 1983, he left the Tribune for the Chicago Sun-Times as an op-ed columnist. He later became a member of the Sun-Times editorial board, and retired from the Sun-Times in 1995.

A founder of the National Association of Black Journalists, he served as its second president.

== Personal life ==
Vernon Jarrett was married to Fernetta Jarrett. They had two sons, William R. Jarrett and Thomas S. Jarrett. Both sons attended private schools due to their father's fears about gang violence. Dr. William Jarrett was an obstetrician and married Valerie Bowman in 1983. William and Valerie had one daughter, Laura, and divorced in 1988. William Jarrett died at age 40 of a heart attack in 1993. Vernon's granddaughter Laura is a prominent journalist for NBC News and is an anchor for Today.

Vernon Jarrett died from cancer in Chicago on May 23, 2004.

== Legacy ==
In 1974, Jarrett established the ACT-SO program to assist inner-city youth in academic fields and shine a light on them for achievement in these areas. Initially, it was for the Chicago NAACP, but Jarrett realized it should be made a national program and worked to have the NAACP adopt it and help to foster it nationwide. As of 2016, over 200,000 students from across the country have participated in the competition.

The Vernon Jarrett Medal for Journalistic Excellence is awarded annually by the Institute for Advanced Journalism Studies of North Carolina Agricultural and Technical State University to honor "outstanding coverage of people of African descent and the issues that impact their lives."
