= Bruce Johnson (journalist) =

American TV journalist (1950–2022)

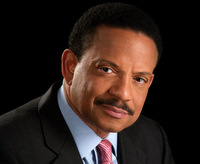
- Johnson in 2007
- Born: June 5, 1950; Louisville, Kentucky, U.S.
- Died: April 3, 2022 (aged 71); Rehoboth Beach, Delaware, U.S.
- Occupations: Broadcast journalist, author, public speaker
- Spouse: Lori Smith
- Children: 3

Chester Bruce Johnson (June 5, 1950 – April 3, 2022) was an American television news anchorman and reporter for WUSA 9 (CBS) TV in Washington, D.C. He focused on politics and urban affairs as a journalist.

In 2018, Johnson was honored by NATAS with its Board of Governors Award. He also won the Ted Yates Award in 1984, given only with the unanimous consent of the NATAS Board of Directors. In 2003, the Society of Professional Journalists inducted Johnson into the Hall of Fame. He was also a member of the Washington, D.C., Hall of Fame.

== Biography ==
=== Early life and education ===
Born in Louisville, Kentucky, on June 5, 1950, Johnson attended Kentucky State University for three years before beginning his broadcast career at the Cincinnati CBS affiliate, WCPO-TV He transferred to Northern Kentucky University, where he graduated in 1973 with a degree in political science. He later earned a master's degree in public affairs from the University of Cincinnati. Johnson was a Catholic seminarian before deciding to pursue both acting and journalism.

=== Professional career ===
While still an undergraduate student, Johnson began his career at WCPO-TV in Cincinnati, Ohio. In 1976, he joined WUSA 9 TV, the CBS affiliate in Washington, D.C. He co-anchored Channel 9's 6 p.m. weekly newscasts. Until 2019, he also anchored "Off Script with Bruce Johnson," a weeknight 7 p.m. broadcast.

Johnson distinguished himself early with notable news stories, including the 1982 Washington Metro train derailment that killed three people and injured 25 others. He covered the 1977 Hanafi Siege where 12 gunmen seized three Washington, D.C., buildings, held 149 hostages and killed a radio journalist colleague; a city hall police officer later died of a heart attack in hospital.

The early 1990s saw him report and anchor for the acclaimed "Capitols of the World" documentaries. Johnson was dispatched to Moscow, Paris, Stockholm, Budapest, Tokyo, Dakar, and Bangkok.

Johnson's assignments in 2010 included a trip to Port-Au-Prince to cover the deadly earthquake and aftermath in Haiti.

In March 2013, Johnson reported live from Rome on the election of Pope Francis. Years before, he also covered the Vatican installation of Washington Archbishop Cardinal Theodore McCarrick. From Washington, D.C., Johnson covered the visits of Pope Benedict XVI and Pope Francis.

Johnson covered the rise, fall, and rise again of D.C.'s best known and controversial local politician, the late D.C. Mayor and City Councilmember Marion Barry, including Barry's arrest at the Vista Hotel for smoking crack cocaine, his prison sentence and return to elective political office. Before his death, the "Mayor for Life," Marion Barry, had instructed his family and staff that Johnson be the only journalist to speak at his public funeral, which drew thousands. Johnson explained to the crowd, "I'm ... thankful to Marion Barry. I owe him my career."

In 1992, Johnson suffered a heart attack while covering a news story in Washington, D.C. He had just interviewed drug dealers working next to a youth summer jobs program hosted by D.C. Mayor Sharon Pratt Kelly. He felt a tightening in his chest and his cameraman drove him to a local firehouse. Firefighters transported Johnson to the hospital, where doctors discovered he had suffered a massive heart attack often referred to as a "widow maker." He was 42 years old. As part of his recovery, Bruce Johnson trained and completed the 26.2-mile Marine Corps Marathon in Washington Marine Corps Marathon.

Johnson also authored the book Heart to Heart, featuring his story and the diverse comeback stories of 11 other male and female cardiac survivors. The book was also published by the People's Medical Publishing House in China. Johnson traveled to Beijing and Shanghai to promote the book.

Johnson authored a second book in 2012, All Or Nothing, The Victor Page Story, which documents the life of former NBA prospect Victor Page. In 2018, Johnson returned to NKU as commencement speaker. He was awarded an honorary doctorate degree.

=== Death ===
Johnson died on April 3, 2022, after a heart attack in Lewes, Delaware. He was 71 years old.

== Awards and recognition ==
Johnson was honored by many organizations as part of his journalism and volunteer work in the District of Columbia and surrounding areas. In 1983–1984, Johnson earned the Ted Yates Award given only with the unanimous consent of the Board of Governors of the National Academy of Television Arts and Sciences (NATAS). This award is given to an individual who has demonstrated outstanding professional and personal qualities in their contribution to the National Capital Chesapeake Bay region's television news and public affairs.

In 2003, Johnson was voted into the Society of Professional Journalists' Hall of Fame. The D.C. Council also recognized him as one of the nation's best urban-affairs and investigative journalists. In 2007, Johnson won a local Emmy for his report that resulted in much-needed repairs to the Duke Ellington School of the Arts. He captured multiple Emmys for his reports on the city's violent crack epidemic in the 1980s and '90s and the plight of D.C.'s inner-city youth. Over the years, he won 22 Emmy awards. The Capitol Press Club awarded Johnson its Communication Award of Excellence in 1990. He was an inductee to NATAS Silver Circle and a member of the Washington, D.C., Hall of Fame. Johnson received the Doctor's National Award from the Association of Black Cardiologists in 2011. in June 2018, he was honored with the Board of Governors Award from the National Academy of Television Arts & Sciences (NATAS).

== Personal life ==
Johnson was married with three children and five grandchildren. He enjoyed road biking and he practiced yoga.

=== Advocacy ===
In 2018, Johnson became a life member of "Mended Hearts," the premier nonprofit advocacy organization for men, women, and children recovering from cardiac issues. Through public speaking, interviews and his website, Bruce Johnson Heart to Heart, he advocated for heart-healthy lifestyles. His efforts included a three-part television series that won national recognition from the American Heart Association and a documentary for the Association of Black Cardiologists (ABC) titled "Before You Eat the Church Food, Watch This Video."
