= National Association of Black Journalists =

Organization of African-American journalists

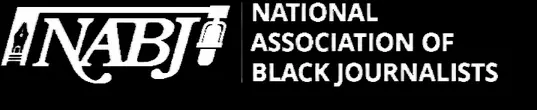
- Abbreviation: NABJ
- Founded: 1975
- Founded at: Washington, D.C.
- Type: Nonprofit organization
- Purpose: Professional association
- Headquarters: College Park, Maryland
- Members: 4,000
- President: Errin Haines
- Executive Director: Vacant
- Website: nabjonline.org

The National Association of Black Journalists (NABJ) is a 501(c)(3) nonprofit educational and professional organization of African American journalists, students, and media professionals. Founded in 1975 in Washington, D.C., by 44 journalists, the NABJ's stated purpose is to provide quality programs and services to and advocate on behalf of black journalists. The organization has worked for diversity and to increase the number of minorities in newsrooms across the country.

The association's national office is on the main campus of the University of Maryland, College Park. The current president is Ken Lemon, a reporter for WSOC in Charlotte, North Carolina, and the executive director is Drew Berry. The NABJ states that it has a membership of 4,100 and is the largest organization of journalists of color in the United States. The organization was one of the four minority journalist member associations in the UNITY: Journalists of Color, Inc. until they seceded from the organization in Spring 2011.

The organization's annual Salute to Excellence Awards honors coverage of African-American people and subjects. Awards given include Journalist of the Year, Emerging Journalist and Lifetime Achievement; past honorees have included Lester Holt, Ed Bradley, Carole Simpson, Byron Pitts, Charlayne Hunter-Gault, Bernard Shaw, Gwen Ifill, and Michele Norris. NABJ also maintains the NABJ Hall of Fame, which is designed to honor black journalists.

== History ==
The founding meeting of the National Association of Black Journalists was held on December 12, 1975, in Washington, D.C., at the Sheraton Park Hotel (now the Marriott Wardman Park). The interim committee for a National Association of Black Journalists, The Association of Black Journalists in Philadelphia, Chicago Association of Black Journalists, San Francisco Association of Black Journalists and the Washington Association of Black Journalists hosted the founding to create the National Association of Black Journalists based on the work of the Black Perspective, a 1967 group of journalists. The National Association of Black Journalists saw fit its creation because at the time, there were associations of other professions including teachers, lawyers and doctors and believed journalists to be as important and other professions. A 1968 Kerner Commission Report mentioned how small a role black people held in a white media environment. The National Association of Black Journalists was founded to increase the presence of black people in mainstream media and change the misrepresentation of black people. The organization used the constitution of The Association of Black Journalists in Philadelphia. Founded on Friday, December 12, 1975, the organization explicitly stated their excitement to cover the 1976 presidential campaigns.

=== Founders ===
- Norma Adams-Wade, Dallas Morning News
- Carole Bartel, CORE Magazine
- Edward Blackwell, Milwaukee Journal
- Reginald Bryant, Black Perspective on the News
- Maureen Bunyan, WTOP-TV (Washington, D.C.)
- Crispin Campbell, WNET-TV (New York City)
- Charlie Cobb, WHUR (Washington, D.C.)
- Marilyn Darling, WHYY-TV (Wilmington, Delaware)
- Leon Dash, Washington Post
- Joe Davidson, Philadelphia Bulletin
- Allison J. Davis, WBZ-TV (Boston)
- Paul Delaney, The New York Times
- William Dilday, WLBT-TV (Jackson, Mississippi)
- Sandra Rosen Dillard, Denver Post
- Joel Dreyfuss, Washington Post
- Sam Ford, WCCO-TV (Minneapolis)
- David Gibson, Mutual Black Network
- Sandra Gilliam-Beale, WHIO-TV (Dayton, Ohio)
- Bob Greenlee, New Haven Register
- Martha Griffin, National Public Radio
- Derwood Hall, WSOC-TV (Charlotte, North Carolina)
- Bob Hayes, San Francisco Examiner
- Toni Jones, Detroit Free Press
- Mal Johnson, Cox Broadcasting
- Vernon Jarrett, Chicago Tribune
- Claude Lewis, Philadelphia Bulletin
- H. Chuku Lee, Africa Journal Ltd.
- Sandra Dawson Long, News Journal (Wilmington, Delaware)
- Pluria Marshall, freelancer
- Acel Moore, Philadelphia Inquirer
- Luix Overbea, The Christian Science Monitor
- Les Payne, Newsday
- Alex Poinsett, Ebony
- Claudia Polley, NBC News
- Richard Rambeau, Project Bait (Detroit)
- W. Curtis Riddle, Louisville Courier-Journal
- Max Robinson, WTOP-TV (Washington, D.C.)
- Charlotte Roy, Detroit Free Press
- Vince Sanders, National Black Network
- Chuck Stone, Philadelphia Daily News
- Jeannye Thornton, U.S. News & World Report
- Francis Ward, Los Angeles Times
- John C. White, Washington Star
- DeWayne Wickham, Baltimore Sun
- Paul Brock, Founding NABJ Executive Director

== Annual convention and career fair ==
NABJ annually holds the nation's largest journalism convention and career fair each summer with plenary sessions and workshops for career and professional development.

Recent speakers have included former U.S. Presidents Donald Trump, Barack Obama, George W. Bush and Bill Clinton, Liberian President Ellen Johnson Sirleaf, Hillary Clinton, and Senegalese President Abdoulaye Wade.

The NABJ Career Fair encompasses the nations broadcast, print, and online media including recruiters from Gannett Corporation, NBC News, CNN, Bloomberg, Google, ESPN, The Huffington Post, The New York Times, and Tribune Company.

NABJ held its first convention in October 1976 at Texas Southern University, which at the time had recently established the second school of communications at a historically black college or university in the nation (the first was the School of Communications at Howard University).

Locations of the NABJ Convention and Career Fair include Las Vegas in 2022; Birmingham in 2023; Chicago in 2024; Cleveland in 2025; Atlanta in 2026; and Houston in 2027.

In October 2014, CNN withdrew its support for the 2015 Convention and Career Fair after the NABJ criticized the network for its lack of diversity on air and its treatment of black employees.

== Scholarships ==
The organization also distributes more than $100,000 in scholarships to African-American college journalism students, places 14-16 students at paid internships and sponsors short courses for students at historically black colleges and universities.

== Task forces ==
- Arts & Entertainment Task Forces – members who cover arts and entertainment
- Associate Member's – part-time journalists, educators, marketing and public relations professionals
- Copy Editors – copy desk managers, news editors, design editors
- Digital Journalism
- NABJ Founders – NABJ Founders, past presidents, and former national board members
- LGBT Taskforce – lesbian, gay, bisexual and transgender members
- Sports Task Force – sports reporters, correspondents and analysts
- Visual Task Force – photojournalists, design/informational graphics
- Young Journalists – journalists in their first few years
- World Affairs – promotes worldwide coverage of African/African-Americans

== Presidents ==
Twenty-one people have served as president of the National Association of Black Journalists:

- Chuck Stone, 1975–77
- Vernon Jarrett, 1977–79
- Bob Reid, 1979–81
- Les Payne, 1981–83
- Merv Aubespin, 1983–85
- Al Fitzpatrick, 1985–87
- DeWayne Wickham, 1987–89
- Thomas Morgan III, 1989–91
- Sidmel Estes-Sumpter, 1991–93
- Dorothy Butler Gilliam, 1993–95
- Arthur Fennell, 1995–97
- Vanessa Williams, 1997–99
- William W. Sutton Jr., 1999–2001
- Condace Pressley, 2001–03
- Herbert Lowe, 2003–05
- Bryan Monroe, 2005–07
- Barbara Ciara, 2007–09
- Kathy Y. Times, 2009–11
- Gregory Lee Jr., 2011–2013
- Bob Butler, 2013–2015
- Sarah Glover, 2015–2019
- Dorothy Tucker, 2019–present

== Awards ==
During its Annual Convention and Career Fair, NABJ presents various awards at the annual Salute to Excellence Awards Gala.

=== Journalist of the Year ===
- 1979 – Acel Moore, Philadelphia Inquirer, Les Payne, Newsday
- 1980
- 1981 – Robert C. Maynard, Oakland Tribune, Max Robinson, ABC
- 1982 – Gil Noble, WABC-TV, New York
- 1983 – Joe Ogelsby, Miami Herald
- 1984 – Morris Thompson, Newsday
- 1985 – Kenneth Walker, ABC, Dennis Bell, Newsday
- 1986 – Charlayne Hunter-Gault, PBS
- 1987 – Andrew W. Cooper, The City Sun, Brooklyn, NY
- 1988 – Michel du Cille, The Washington Post
- 1989 – Bernard Shaw, CNN
- 1990 – Maureen Bunyan, WUSA-TV, Washington, DC
- 1991 – Soledad O'Brien, CNN
- 1992 – Carole Simpson, Charlayne Hunter-Gault ABC
- 1993 – Bryant Gumbel, NBC Today
- 1994 – Isabel Wilkerson, The New York Times
- 1995 – Andrea Ford, Los Angeles Times [deceased]
- 1996 – Ed Gordon, BET News, NBC
- 1997 – Gary Fields, USA Today
- 1998 – Clarence Williams III, Los Angeles Times
- 1999 – Ron Allen, NBC
- 2000 – Kevin Mérida, The Washington Post
- 2001 – Gerald Boyd, The New York Times
- 2002 – Byron Pitts, CBS
- 2003 – George Curry, NNPA
- 2004 – Hannah Allam (McClatchy Newspapers), Middle East Bureau Chief
- 2005 – Andy Alford, Austin American-Statesman
- 2006 – Cynthia Tucker, Atlanta Journal-Constitution
- 2007 – Dean Baquet, Washington Bureau Chief, The New York Times
- 2008 – Leonard Pitts, Miami Herald
- 2009 – Michele Norris, National Public Radio
- 2010 – Soledad O'Brien, CNN
- 2011 – Jacqueline Charles, Miami Herald
- 2012 – Pierre Thomas, ABC News
- 2013 – Roland S. Martin, TV One
- 2014 – Stephen Henderson, Detroit Free Press, for his columns on the financial crisis facing his hometown of Detroit
- 2015 – Nikole Hannah-Jones
- 2016 – Lester Holt, NBC Nightly News
- 2017 – April Ryan, American Urban Radio Networks
- 2018 – Jemele Hill, ESPN's The Undefeated
- 2019 – Karen Attiah, Washington Post
- 2020 – Yamiche Alcindor, PBS NewsHour
- 2021 – Libor Jany, Star Tribune
- 2022 – Jacqueline Charles, Miami Herald
- 2023 – Jim Trotter, The Athletic

=== Journalist of Distinction ===
- 2016 – Steve Crump, WBTV
- 2017 – Leoneda Inge, WUNC Radio
- 2018 – Everett Marshburn, Milwaukee PBS
- 2019 – Mel Showers, WKRG
- 2020 – Elaine Houston, WNYT
- 2021 – Jenise Griffin, Florida Courier/Daytona Times
- 2022 – Imara Jones, TransLash Media
- 2023 – Jamie Nesbitt Golden, Block Club Chicago

=== Legacy Award ===
- 2005 – Acel Moore, The Philadelphia Inquirer
- 2006 – Lawrence E. Young, The Press Enterprise
- 2007 – Glenn Proctor, The Star-Ledger (Newark, N.J.)
- 2008 – Evelyn Cunningham, The Pittsburgh Courier
- 2009 – Leon Carter and Sandy Rosenbush, Sports Journalism Institute
- 2010 – Paula Madison, NBC Universal
- 2011 – Claire Smith (ESPN)
- 2012 – Monica Pearson, WSB-TV (Atlanta)
- 2013 – Theodore "Ted" Holtzclaw, WABC (New York) (Posthumous)
- 2014 – Hugh Grannum, photographer (posthumously), Detroit Free Press
- 2015 – Bryan Burwell, sports journalist (posthumously), The St. Louis Post-Dispatch
- 2016 – David Aldridge, Turner Sports
- 2017 – Ron Thomas, Director of the Journalism and Sports Program at Morehouse College
- 2018 – Robert McGruder, Detroit Free Press (Posthumous)
- 2019 – James Washington, Dallas Weekly
- 2020 – Rehema Ellis, NBC News
- 2021 – Janis Ware, The Atlanta Voice
- 2022 – Richard M. Peery, Cleveland Plain Dealer
- 2023 – Michelle Singletary, The Washington Post

=== Journalism Educator of the Year ===
- 2005 – Karen Clark, Langston University
- 2006 – Kip Branch, Elizabeth City State University
- 2007 – Robert Adams & James Highland, Western Kentucky University
- 2008 – Nagatha Tonkins, North Carolina A&T State University
- (no 2009 award given)
- 2010 – James Hawkins, Florida A&M University
- 2011 – Bonnie Newman Davis, Virginia Commonwealth University
- 2012 – Allissa Richardson, Morgan State University
- 2013 – Michelle Johnson, Boston University
- 2014 – Dr. Linda Florence Callahan, North Carolina A&T State University
- 2015 – Dr. Sybril Brown, Belmont University
- 2016 – Gail Wiggins, North Carolina A&T University
- 2017 – Cheryl W. Thompson, George Washington University
- 2018 – Alicia Nails, Wayne State University
- 2019 – Eva Coleman, Frisco ISD-TV
- 2020 – Susan Mango Curtis, Northwestern University and James McJunkins Sr., Clark Atlanta University
- 2021 – Dr. Sherri Williams, American University
- 2022 – Miki Turner, University of Southern California
- 2023 – Jayme Bradford Kinard (Posthumous), Black Allen University

=== Student Journalist of the Year ===
- 2007 – Eddie Cole, Jr., Tennessee State University
- 2010 – Philip Lucas, Howard University
- 2011 – Ashley Williams, University of Southern California
- 2012 – Eric Burse, USC Annenberg School of Communications
- 2013 – Marissa A. Evans, Marquette University
- 2014 – Claudia Balthazar (Hofstra University’s graduate) and Averi Harper (Columbia University graduate)
- 2015 – Tierra Smith, Grambling State University
- 2016 – LaCrai Mitchell. Florida A&M University
- 2017 – Gino Terrell, Hamline University
- 2018 – Doni Holloway, UNC Chapel Hill School of Media and Journalism
- 2019 – Allana Barefield, Xavier University
- 2020 – Arthur Cribbs, Howard University
- 2021 – Giulia Heyward, Hussman School of Journalism and Media
- 2022 – Amudalat Ajasa, The New York Times’ Ida B. Wells Society
- 2023 – Jordan D. Brown, Morgan State University

=== Community Service Award ===
- 1997 – Joe Madison, WRC-Radio
- 1998 – Gwen Tolbart, KTVT, Dallas, Texas
- 1999 – C. Ron Allen, Fort Lauderdale Sun-Sentinel
- 2000 – Andrew Humphrey, WRC-TV, Washington, D.C.
- 2001 – Angela Curry, Kansas City Star
- 2002 – DeWayne Wickham, USA Today, GNS
- 2003 – Yvonne Lewis-Harris, KTUL-TV, Channel 8
- 2004 – Mollie Finch Belt, The Dallas Examiner
- 2005 – Derek Nathaniel Ali, Dayton Daily News [posthumous]
- 2006 – DeMarco Morgan, WISN-TV, Milwaukee
- 2007 – Linda Waller Shockley, Dow Jones Newspaper Fund
- 2008 – Margaret Bernstein, The Cleveland Plain Dealer
- (no award given in 2009)
- 2010 – Michelle Singletary, Founder of First Baptist Church of Glenarden, Maryland
- 2011 – Stacey Tisdale, NBC, PBS and WowOWow.com
- 2012 – Albert Knighten, 107.5 FM
- 2013 – Dr. Shelley Stewart, The Mattie C. Stewart Foundation
- 2014 – Michaela Pereira, CNN
- 2015 – Lewis W. Diugid
- 2016 – Chauncey Glover, WDIV-TV
- 2017 – Bobby Henry, Westside Gazette
- 2018 – Rhonda Walker WDIV-TV Local 4 (Detroit)
- 2019 – Cheryl Action Jackson, Minnie’s Food Pantry
- 2020 – Chelle Luper Wilson
- 2021 – Tenisha Taylor, Ezekiel Taylor Scholarship Foundation
- 2022 – Karleen Leveille Robinson, WBNG TV 12
- 2023 – Tonya Rivens, Ausie and Martin Rivens Scholarship Foundation

=== Emerging Journalist of the Year ===
- 2003 – Isaac Peterson III
- 2004 – Theola Labbé
- 2005 – Krissah Williams
- 2006 – Errin Haines and Trymaine Lee
- 2007 – Mara Schiavocampo
- 2008 – Sarah Hoye
- 2010 – Michael Feeney, The Daily News in New York
- 2009 – Cynthia Gordy
- 2011 – Kimberley A. Martin, Newsday
- 2012 – Gerrick Kennedy, L.A. Times
- 2013 – Yamiche Alcindor, USA Today
- 2014 – Wesley Lowery, The Washington Post
- 2015 – Brittany Noble-Jones, KMOV in St. Louis, Missouri
- 2016 – Jamiles Lartey, The Guardian
- 2017 – Ernest Owens, G Philly (co-winner)
- 2017 – Candace Smith, ABC News
- 2019 – Alexi McCammond
- 2020 – Rachel V. Scott, ABC News
- 2021 – Malika Andrews, ESPN
- 2022 – Sarahbeth Maney, The Detroit Free Press
- 2023 – Troy Closson, The New York Times

=== Pat Tobin Media Professional Award ===
- 2011 – Sheila Brooks, SRB Communications
- 2012 – Janet Rolle, CNN
- 2013 – Dawn Kelly, Prudential
- 2014 – Tiffany R. Warren, ADColor, Omnicom Groups
- 2015 – Carole Munroe, Disney
- 2016 – Darci McConnell, McConnell Communications
- 2017 – Jocelyn Allen, The Allen Lewis Agency
- 2018 – Wynona Redmond, Wyn Win Communications
- 2019 – Ron Carter, The Carter Agency
- 2020 – Ramona Logan, Dallas Black Dance Theatre
- 2021 – Aprill O. Turner, Higher Heights for America
- 2022 – Kayla Tucker Adams, KTA Media Group
- 2023 – The National Black Public Relations Society

=== Chuck Stone Lifetime Achievement Award ===
- 1978 – Mal Goode, ABC News
- 1979 – Carl Murphy, Afro-American Newspapers
- 1980 – Carl Rowan, syndicated columnist
- 1981 – Lerone Bennett Jr., Ebony
- 1982 – Ethel Payne, Sengstacke Newspapers
- 1983 – Gordon Parks, Carlton Goodlett, San Francisco Reporter
- 1984 – Albert Fitzpatrick, Knight-Ridder Inc.
- 1985 – Lu Palmer, Chicago Sun-Times
- 1986 – Jimmy Hicks, Amsterdam News [posthumous]
- 1987 – John H. Johnson, Johnson Publishing Co.
- 1988 – Armistead Pride, Lincoln University
- 1989 – Peggy Peterman, St. Petersburg Times
- 1990 – Vernon Jarrett, Chicago Sun-Times
- 1991 – Sam Lacy, Afro-American
- 1992 – Chuck Stone, UNC
- 1993 – Luix Overbea, Christian Science Monitor
- 1994 – William Raspberry, Washington Post
- 1995 – Thomas Morgan III, The New York Times
- 1996 – William Brower, Toledo Blade
- 1997 – Samuel L. Adams, University of Kansas
- 1998 – Sarah-Ann Shaw, WBZ-TV, Boston
- 1999 – Belva Davis, KPIX-TV, San Francisco
- 2000 – Joseph A. Palmer Sr., Proud magazine [posthumous] and Dr. Ernest C. Withers Sr., The Withers Studio
- 2001 – Charles Jackson, Oakland Tribune [posthumous]
- 2002 – Robert McGruder, Detroit Free Press [posthumous]
- 2003 – Greg Freeman, St. Louis Post-Dispatch [posthumous]
- 2004 – Clarence Page, Chicago Tribune
- 2005 – Ed Bradley, CBS News
- 2006 – Earl G. Graves, Sr., Black Enterprise Magazine
- 2007 – Bernard Shaw, CNN
- 2008 – Harry Porterfield, WLS-TV, Chicago
- 2009 – Michael Wilbon, The Washington Post/ESPN
- 2010 – Paul Delaney, The New York Times
- 2011 – Acel Moore, NABJ Founder & Pulitzer Prize Winner
- 2012 – Les Payne, Newsday
- 2013 – Gregory L. Moore
- 2013 – DeWayne Wickham, USA Today, Morgan State University
- 2014 – Sandra Hughes, former anchor, WFMY-TV, Greensboro, NC
- 2017 – Yvette Miley, MSNBC
- 2018 – Beverly White, KNBC Los Angeles
- 2020 – Kevin Merida, ESPN
- 2021 – Art Norman, NBC Chicago
- 2022 – Dean Baquet, The New York Times
- 2023 – Marquita Pool-Eckert, CBS News

=== Percy Qoboza Foreign Journalist ===
- 1989 – Zwelakhe Sisulu, New Nation, South Africa [1st winner]
- 1993 – Ben Ephson, West Africa (magazine), Ghana
- 1994 – Zubeida Jaffer, Cape Town, South Africa
- 1995 – Kenneth Best, The Daily Observer, Liberia
- 1996 – Babacar Fall, Pan-African News Agency, Senegal
- 1997 – Marie-Roger Biloa, Africa International magazine, Paris
- 1998 –
- 1999 – Fred Mmembe, The Post, Zambia
- 2000 – Rafael Marques, Angola
- 2002 – Milkias Mihreteab Yohannes, Eritrea
- 2003 – Geoff Nyarota, The Daily News, Zimbabwe
- 2004 – Pius Njawé, Cameroon
- 2005 – Michèle Montas, Haiti
- 2006 – Deyda Hydara, and members of the Gambian Press Union (posthumous)
- 2007 – National Union of Somali Journalists
- 2008 – Imprisoned Journalists of Eritrea
- 2011 – Jean-Claude Kavumbagu, Net Press
- 2012 –
- 2013 –
- 2014 –
- 2015 –
- 2016 –
- 2017 – Wesley Gibbings, Association of Caribbean MediaWorkers
- 2018 – Chika Oduah, Voice of America
- 2019 – Pap Saine, The Point
- 2020 – Mahmoud Hussein, Al Jazeera
- 2021 – Anas Aremeyaw Anas, Insight TWI
- 2022 – Nima Elbagir, CNN
- 2023 – Marcus Ryder, Sir Lenny Henry Centre for Media Diversity
- 2024 – Roberson Alphonse, Le Nouvelliste, Haiti

=== Best Practices ===
- 2006 – The Indianapolis Recorder
- 2007 – CNN
- 2009 – The Chauncey Bailey Project
- 2010 – NBC Universal
- 2011 –
- 2012 – TV ONE
- 2013 – The Washington Post
- 2014 – Al Jazeera
- 2015 – Buzzfeed
- 2016 – Cox Media Group
- 2017 – The Emma Bowen Foundation
- 2018 – International Consortium of Investigative Journalists and Cenozo
- 2019 – MLK50: Justice Through Journalism
- 2020 – The Trace
- 2021 – The Dallas Morning News
- 2022 – The Markup
- 2023 – Scalawag

=== Student Chapter of the Year ===
- 1997 – University of Georgia
- 1998 – Boston Association of Black Journalists Student Consortium
- 1999 – Penn State Association of Journalists for Diversity
- 2000 – Atlanta Association of Black Journalists Student Consortium
- 2001 – Carolina Association of Black Journalists
- 2002 – Carolina Association of Black Journalists
- 2003 – University of North Texas
- 2004 – University of Oregon
- 2005 – Northwestern University
- 2006 – Temple Association of Black Journalists
- 2007 – University of Georgia
- 2008 – Florida A&M University
- 2015 – Northwestern University
- 2016 – University of Southern California
- 2017 – Morgan State University
- 2018 – North Carolina A&T University of Black Journalists
- 2019 – Winthrop University Association of Black Journalists
- 2020 – Michigan State University
- 2022 – University of North Texas
- 2023 – University of Missouri

=== Chapter of the Year ===
- 1996 – Garden State (New Jersey) Association of Black Journalists
- 1997 – Cleveland Chapter of NABJ
- 1998 – Richmond Association of Black Journalists
- 1999 – Atlanta Association of Black Journalists
- 2000 – Wisconsin Black Media Association
- 2001 – Detroit Chapter of NABJ
- 2002 – Houston Association of Black Journalists
- 2003 – San Diego Association of Black Journalists
- 2004 – Black Journalists Association of Southern California
- 2005 – Hampton Roads
- 2006 – Houston Association of Black Journalists
- 2007 – Washington Association of Black Journalists
- 2008 – Philadelphia Association of Black Journalists
- 2012 – Atlanta Association of Black Journalists
- 2013 – New York Association of Black Journalists
- 2014 – Philadelphia Association of Black Journalists
- 2015 – Pittsburgh Black Media Federation & Southern New England Association of Black Journalists
- 2016 – Baton Rouge Area Association of Black Journalists & Greater Cleveland Association of Black Journalists
- 2017 – Pittsburgh Black Media Federation
- 2018 – Chicago
- 2019 – Rochester Association of Black Journalists & San Diego Association of Black Journalists
- 2020 – Los Angeles
- 2022 – Chicago
- 2023 – Washington Association of Black Journalists

=== President's Award ===
- 1993 – William A. Hilliard, The Oregonian
- 1994 – Nancy Hicks Maynard, Oakland Tribune
- 1995 – John Dotson, Akron Beacon Journal
- 1996 – Bob Johnson, BET
- 1997 – Vernon Jarrett, Chicago Sun-Times
- 2000 – Patsy Pressley, National Association of Black Journalists
- 2001 – Paula Madison, NBC
- 2002 – Leonard Pitts, Jr., Miami Herald
- 2003 – Richard Prince, The Washington Post
- 2004 – Don Hudson, The Clarion-Ledger
- 2005 – Monte Trammer, The Star-Gazette
- 2006 – Ryan L. Williams, National Association of Black Journalists
- 2007 – Rodney Brooks, USA Today
- 2008 – Roland Martin, CNN
- 2009 – Drew Berry, Drew Berry & Associates, LLC (back-to-back)
- 2010 – Drew Berry, Drew Berry & Associates, LLC
- 2011 – Johnathan A. Rodgers, TV ONE
- 2012 – Sarah Glover, NBC10 (Philadelphia)
- 2013 – Kelley L. Carter, EBONY, and Maureen Bunyan, WJLA
- 2014 – Carol D. Ash, Kennedy King College and Vince Hill, KYW (Philadelphia)
- 2015 – Veronique Dodson, National Association of Black Journalists
- 2016 – Elise Durham, Florida A&M University
- 2017 – Sheila Brooks, SRB Communications
- 2018 – Vickie Thomas, WWJ/CBS Radio-Detroit
- 2018 – Ryan L. Williams, NBC News/MSNBC
- 2019 – Kelley Carter, ESPN's The Undefeated
- 2020 – All NABJ Members
- 2022 – Jerry McCormick
- 2023 – Paula Madison, Madison Media Management
