= Louis de Geofroy =

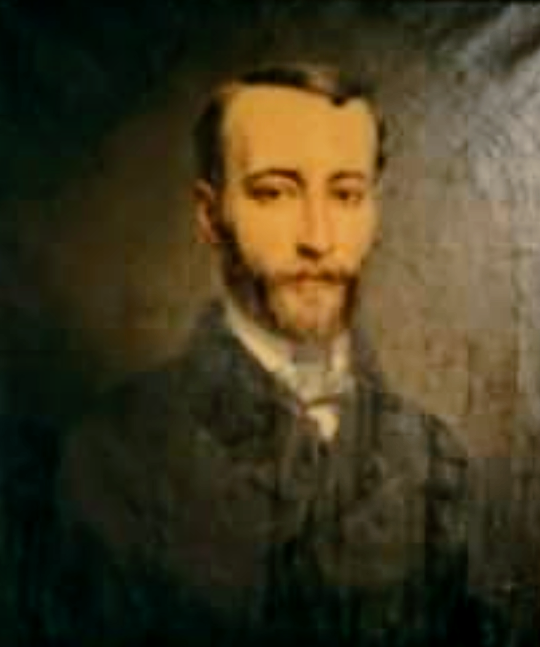
Louis de Geofroy

François-Henri-Louis de Geofroy (17 October 1822 – 5 October 1899) was a French diplomat who was the French ambassador to China from 1872 to 1875 and the chargé d'affaires in Japan.

== Early life ==
Geofroy was born on 17 October 1822 in Vaucluse, a department in the southeastern French region of Provence-Alpes-Côte d'Azur. He was a son of Dominique de Geofroy and Marie Louise Henriette Blaze.

== Career ==
In 1860, Geofroy became the first secretary of the French legation in Washington, D.C., briefly replacing Henri Mercier when he took leave to visit Niagara Falls at the invitation of U.S. Secretary of State William Seward. In May 1862, Geofroy went to Athens returning to Washington in late 1863 as first-class secretary and chargé d'affaires. After the French minister left, "he handled routine business while waiting for Mercier's replacement to arrive in Washington."

Just "a few days before the outbreak of war between France and Prussia, he was appointed envoy extraordinary and minister plenipotentiary to China. He served as the French minister to China from 1872 to 1875. After his service in China, he served in Tokyo as chargé d'affaires in Japan as successor to Ange-Guillaume de St Quentin.

In 1880, Goefroy became chairman of the French and American Claims Commission for Civil War Compensation before retiring in 1883. He was made a Commandeur de la Légion d'honneur.

== Personal life ==
Geofroy was married to Catherine Shedden Riggs (1842–1881), a daughter of American banker George Washington Riggs of the Riggs National Bank. Among Catherine's siblings were sister, Cecilia (the wife of British diplomat Sir Henry Howard) and nephew T. Lawrason Riggs, a prominent Catholic priest who was the first Catholic chaplain of Yale University. Together, they were the parents of five sons:

- George Louis Dominique Antoine de Geofroy (1873–1946), a member of the French Diplomatic corps.
- George Jules François de Geofroy (1875–1954), an industrial chemist who married Marie de Forceville (1885–1963), a daughter of Count Léopold de Forceville and Countess Jeanne d'Ortho.

His wife died on February 7, 1881, in Washington D.C. Geofroy died on 5 October 1899 in Cannes, France. He was buried alongside his wife at Mount Olivet Cemetery in Washington.

=== Descendants ===
Through his second son, he was a grandfather of Louis François Léopold de Geofroy, Charles de Geofroy, Henry George de Geofroy, Michel Joseph de Geofroy, and Bertrand de Geofroy.
