= Carl Rakeman =

American painter (1878–1965)

Carl Rakeman (1878–1965) was an American artist for the Bureau of Public Roads during the middle of the 19th century. During his career for the American government he completed 109 paintings depicting historic transportation methods in the United States.

== Early life and education ==
Rakeman was a native Washingtonian (D.C.) born to German-American artist Joseph Rakeman. He was educated at the Corcoran Art School and art academies in Düsseldorf, Munich, and Paris. His art expression was not confined to any one medium. He was an etcher and a painter in watercolors, oils, and frescoes. He also worked in the field of mural decoration.

== Career ==
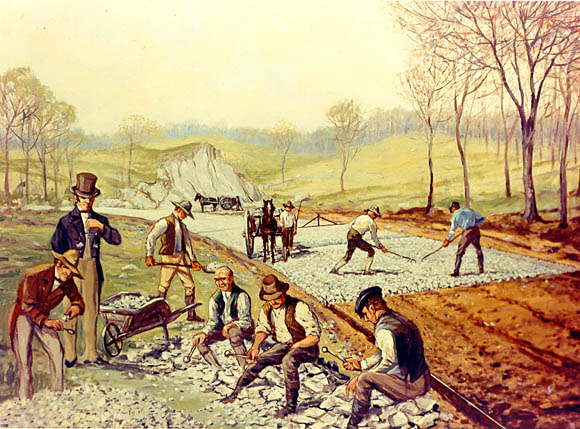
A painting by Rakeman, that depicts the construction of the first macadamized road in the United States (1823). In the foreground, workers are breaking stones "so as not to exceed 6 ounces [170 g] in weight or to pass a two-inch [5 cm] ring".

In 1921, Rakeman joined the Department of Agriculture, which at that time housed the Bureau of Public Roads (BPR) - predecessor of the present Federal Highway Administration. During his career BPR, he painted exhibits for the Good Roads meetings, state fairs, and expositions such as the Brazilian Exposition (1922), the Century of Progress in Chicago (1933), an Overseas Exposition in Paris, the Golden Gate Exposition in San Francisco (1939) and the New York World's Fair (1940). In addition, he completed the series of 109 paintings depicting historic American roads, trails, and highways.

Mr. Rakeman early in his career was singled out by E. F. Andrews, founder and first director of the Corcoran School of Art (and an established artist in the District of Columbia), as the most qualified artist to copy the White House portraits of President and Mrs. Hayes, referring to him as "a young man of great talent." It was his first commission.

=== Corpus ===
Important Rakeman works can be seen in Washington, D.C., and elsewhere throughout the country, such as in the U.S. Soldiers Home (Tennessee), the Ohio State House (Columbus), and the Hayes Memorial Museum (President Rutherford B. Hayes' home), Fremont, Ohio. He is extremely well represented at the latter, having worked continually for Colonel and Mrs. Hayes, painting numerous portraits of the entire Hayes family, and also restoring fine old paintings already hanging in the former President's home.

Among his most notable works are his murals in Washington, particularly the one adjoining the Senate Committee Room on Appropriations in the Capitol. The ceiling was frescoed by Constantino Brumidi, the highly regarded Italian-American artist. However, the lunettes over the windows, doorway, and fireplace were not decorated, and this work was placed in the hands of Carl Rakeman.

In each lunette Mr. Rakeman placed the portrait of a famous American general: George Washington, Anthony Wayne, Joseph Warren, and Horatio Gates. He framed each with an oval laurel wreath. Flanking each of the portraits are flags of the Colonial period, draped over contemporary helmets and arms. It is the only design in the Capitol showing the Colonial flags.

== Retirement ==
Mr. Rakeman retired from the Bureau of Public Roads in 1952, and died at the age of 87, in 1965, at Fremont, Ohio.
