= Armed Forces Retirement Home – Washington =

Retirement home in Washington, D.C.

- U.S. National Register of Historic Places
- U.S. Historic district
- D.C. Inventory of Historic Sites
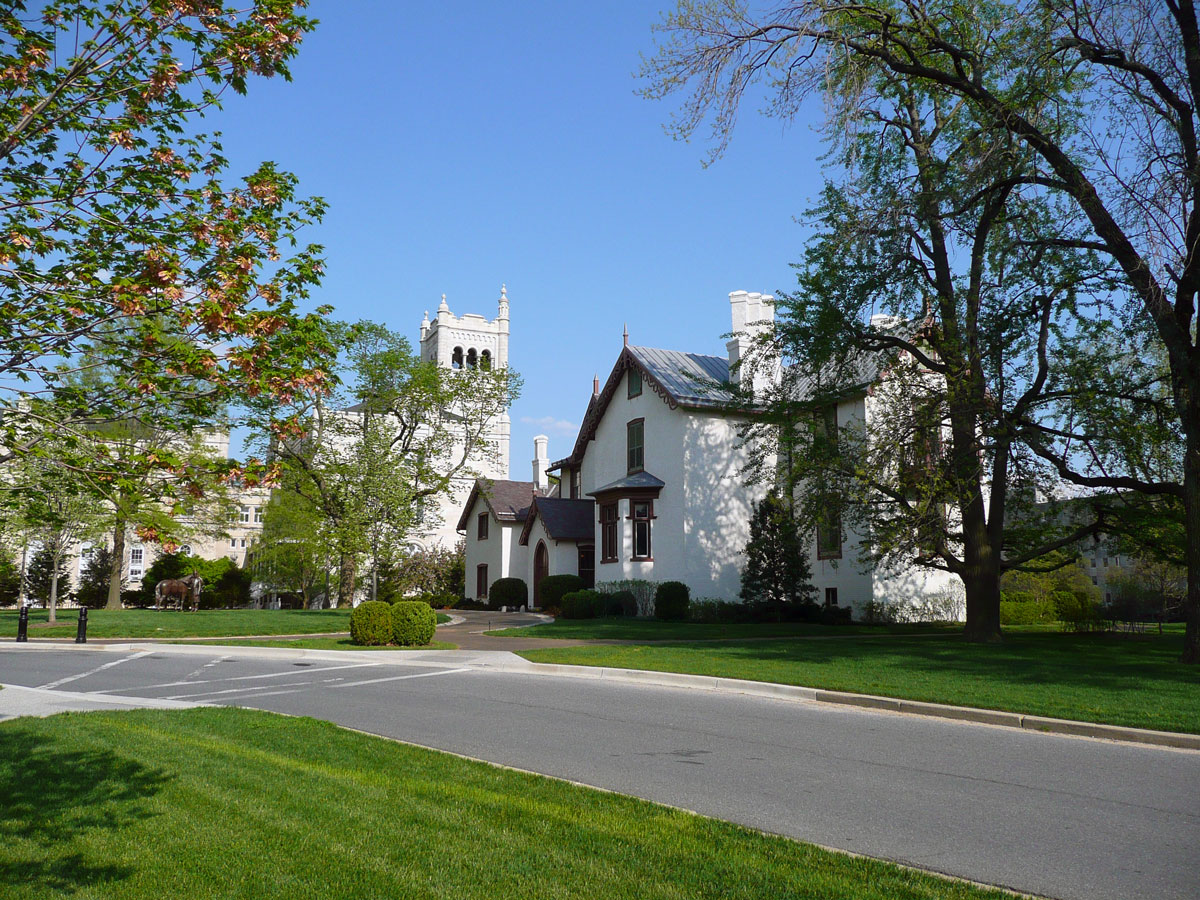
- Lincoln Cottage in April 2009

- Location within Washington, D.C.
- Location: 3700 N. Capitol St., NW; Washington, D.C.
- Coordinates: 38°56′11″N 77°0′33″W
- Architect: William H. Degges, et al.
- NRHP reference No.: 07001237

Significant dates
- Added to NRHP: December 5, 2007
- Designated DCIHS: May 22, 2008

The Armed Forces Retirement Home – Washington, also called Old Soldiers' Retirement Home, is a retirement home for retirees of the United States Armed Forces located in the Park View neighborhood of Washington, D.C. The complex forms an historic district that was listed on the National Register of Historic Places in 2007. President Lincoln's Cottage at the Soldiers' Home is on the campus.

== History ==
The Armed Forces Retirement Home was established as the northern branch of the United States Military Asylum in 1851. The property was originally the country estate of Washington banker George Washington Riggs. The government purchased the estate's 197 acres (80 ha) and an additional 58 acres (23 ha) using an endowment collected by General Winfield Scott. He had received $150,000 in lieu of pillaging during his occupation of Mexico City in 1847. The facility was known as the U.S. Soldiers' Home from 1859 to 1972 and as the U.S. Soldiers’ and Airmen's Home from 1972 to 2001. It has been known as the Armed Forces Retirement Home – Washington since 2001.

Four American Presidents, James Buchanan, Abraham Lincoln, Rutherford B. Hayes and Chester A. Arthur, summered at the home. Lincoln spent a quarter of his presidency in residence. It was here that he worked on the final draft of the Emancipation Proclamation in 1862. While no fighting took place on the site during the American Civil War it was used as a signal post. Given the elevation Lincoln was able to view various skirmishes that arose nearby. Military officers that are associated with the home's operation include Generals Winfield Scott, William Tecumseh Sherman, Philip Sheridan and Surgeon General Joseph K. Barnes.

== Architecture ==
The historic district includes a collection of 19th and early 20th century buildings and extensive historic landscapes. There are 39 contributing buildings and a total of 140 contributing properties that date from 1842 to 1951. The Lincoln Cottage is the centerpiece of the property. It is the original Gothic Revival-style cottage known as Corn Rigs. It was built from 1842 to 1843 as the home for George Riggs. Development of the asylum began in 1852 when the Riggs home was enlarged and the placement of a flagstaff, which marks the establishment of a military installation. The next three masonry buildings were completed by 1857. Other buildings were constructed over next century. The grounds also include recreational areas, statuary, war relics, and other features.
