= Sidney R. Yates Federal Building =

Building in Washington, D.C.

- Bureau of Engraving and Printing; Auditor's Building Complex
- U.S. National Register of Historic Places
- D.C. Inventory of Historic Sites

- Location within Central Washington, D.C. Location within the District of Columbia Location within the United States
- Location: 201 14th Street, SW Washington, D.C. 20250
- Coordinates: 38°53′10″N 77°2′1″W
- Area: 2 acres (0.81 ha)
- Built: 1878–1880
- Architect: James G. Hill
- Architectural style: Romanesque
- NRHP reference No.: 78003051

Significant dates
- Added to NRHP: April 27, 1978
- Designated DCIHS: February 26, 1974

The Sidney R. Yates Federal Building, historically known as the Bureau of Engraving and Printing and later the Auditor's Building Complex, is a large historic federal building located on the National Mall in Washington, D.C.. It was built between 1878 and 1880 that has housed multiple federal government offices. It is an L-shaped building of red and black brick construction in the Romanesque style and was designed by the office of James G. Hill, the Supervising Architect of the Treasury. The brick was provided by the Peerless Brick Company of Philadelphia. The builder was John Fraser, Superintendent of Construction for the Treasury, and the bricklayers were Bitting & Davidson.

The building was originally designed and constructed for the United States Department of the Treasury Bureau of Engraving and Printing (BEP). The Bureau was founded in 1862 to allow the federal government to produce its own official documents; private companies having done so prior to this. The Bureau's machinery and offices were originally located in the Treasury Building, but eventually more space was required. In 1878, land was purchased from philanthropist William Wilson Corcoran and an Act of Congress on June 28 of that year authorized commencement of construction. The building was completed in 1880. Three additions were later constructed in 1891, 1895 and 1900. The Bureau moved to a larger building at 14th & C Streets in 1914.

Following the Bureau's move, the building was used by a number of government agencies, but primarily housed auditors from the Departments of Navy, Treasury, and State, and became known as the "Auditors' Complex". Engravers from the BEP also later used space on the west of the building as it provided excellent natural light for their work. By the 1960s, the building had become underutilized and in need of major renovation. It was slated for demolition in 1966, but was postponed due to lack of funding.

The building was listed on the National Register of Historic Places in April 1978 for its architectural and historical significance. The listing included three contributing buildings, named Annex #1-3, on 2 acres (0.81 ha).

Following a repair and modernization campaign in 1985–1987, the USDA Forest Service moved into the building in 1990 and continues to occupy the building. In 1988, the 1891 addition known as the South Annex was demolished so that the adjacent United States Holocaust Memorial Museum could expand into the space. In 1999, it was redesignated the Sidney R. Yates Federal Building, honoring Illinois Congressman Sidney Richard Yates who helped establish the Holocaust Memorial Museum and served on its council.

In 2017, a working clock was added to the tower. It had been a part of the original design, but was not installed due to excessive costs.

== See also ==
- National Register of Historic Places listings in central Washington, D.C.
