= Elisha Riggs =

American banker (1779–1853)

- Born: June 13, 1779; Brookeville, Maryland, US
- Died: August 3, 1853 (aged 74); New York, New York, US
- Spouses: Alice Lawrason (m. 1812; died 1817) Mary Ann Karrick (m. 1822)
- Children: George Washington Riggs
- Relatives: T. Lawrason Riggs (grandson); Lawrason Riggs (grandson)

Elisha Riggs (June 13, 1779 – August 3, 1853) was an American merchant, soldier and banker who founded the Riggs National Bank.

== Early life ==
Riggs was born on June 13, 1779, in Brookeville, Maryland. He was a son of Lt. Samuel Riggs (1740–1814), a silversmith, and Amelia (née Dorsey) Riggs (1749–1807).

He was a descendant of John Riggs of London who emigrated to the America and married Mary Davis, a daughter of Thomas Davis, one of the original settlers on Herring Creek and who was in the Virginia General Assembly.

== Career ==
After his education, Riggs moved to Georgetown, DC, where he was employed as a merchant. He fought in the War of 1812 as an ensign in Capt. Thomas Owings's 32nd Regiment of the Militia of Anne Arundel County, Maryland. Before that, he had established himself as a dry goods merchant and hired George Peabody as his office boy.

By 1815, Riggs and Peabody entered into a partnership under the firm name of Riggs & Peabody, dry goods merchant. Business flourished and soon they expanded to Baltimore in 1816. By 1821, they had offices in New York City and Philadelphia. In 1822 the firm's name was changed to Riggs, Peabody & Co. with the main office in Baltimore. In 1829 the partnership was dissolved and Riggs retired to New York City. His estate is now part of the United States Custom House in New York.

=== Banking ===
Riggs and Peabody continued their business ventures and engaged in international finance. They were mainly concerned with restoring the credit of Maryland abroad after the depression of 1841 to 1842 and disposed a bond issue of $8 million. Before moving to New York, Elisha established the bank of Corcoran & Riggs in Washington, D.C., which was organized by William Wilson Corcoran and Riggs' son, George, and financed by Elisha. When the United States sought a loan to finance the Mexican–American War, the Riggs bank was the only institution to bid for the full amount and lent the government $34 million in 1847 and 1848. After the retirement of Corcoran, Elisha's son George Washington Riggs and his grandson Elisha Francis Riggs took over the business as Riggs & Co. in Washington. It was successfully run as such until July 1896 when it assumed its present name as the Riggs National Bank. The bank still stands at its original location as PNC Bank (Riggs was acquired by PNC Financial Services in 2005).

== Personal life ==
On September 17, 1812, Riggs was married to Alice Lawrason (1791–1817), a daughter of James Lawrason and Alice (née Levering) Lawrason. Before her death on April 16, 1817, they were the parents of several children, including two surviving sons:

- George Washington Riggs (1813–1881), who married Janet Madeleine Cecilia Shedden and had nine children.
- Lawrason Riggs (1814–1884), who married three times, including to Mary Turpin Bright (a daughter of Sen. Jesse D. Bright) and had thirteen children.

On July 16, 1822, Riggs married Mary Ann Karrick (1798–1870), a daughter of Joseph Karrick and Rebecca (née Ord) Karrick of Philadelphia. Together, they were the parents of several children who lived abroad in Paris, including:

- Elisha Riggs Jr. (1826–1881), who married Mary Boswell of Philadelphia in 1849.
- Joseph Karrick Riggs (1828–1883), who married Rosalie Van Zandt in 1853 and lived in Paris. After his death, she married Prince Paolo Ruspoli in 1888.
- William Henry Riggs (1837–1924), who dedicated his life to armor collecting.
- Mary Alice Riggs (1839–1870), who married Samuel Wilkins Cragg.

Riggs died on August 3, 1853, in New York City, where he was buried. His widow died in Paris in February 1870.
