= Richmond Hill House =

Historic house in North Carolina, United States

- U.S. National Register of Historic Places
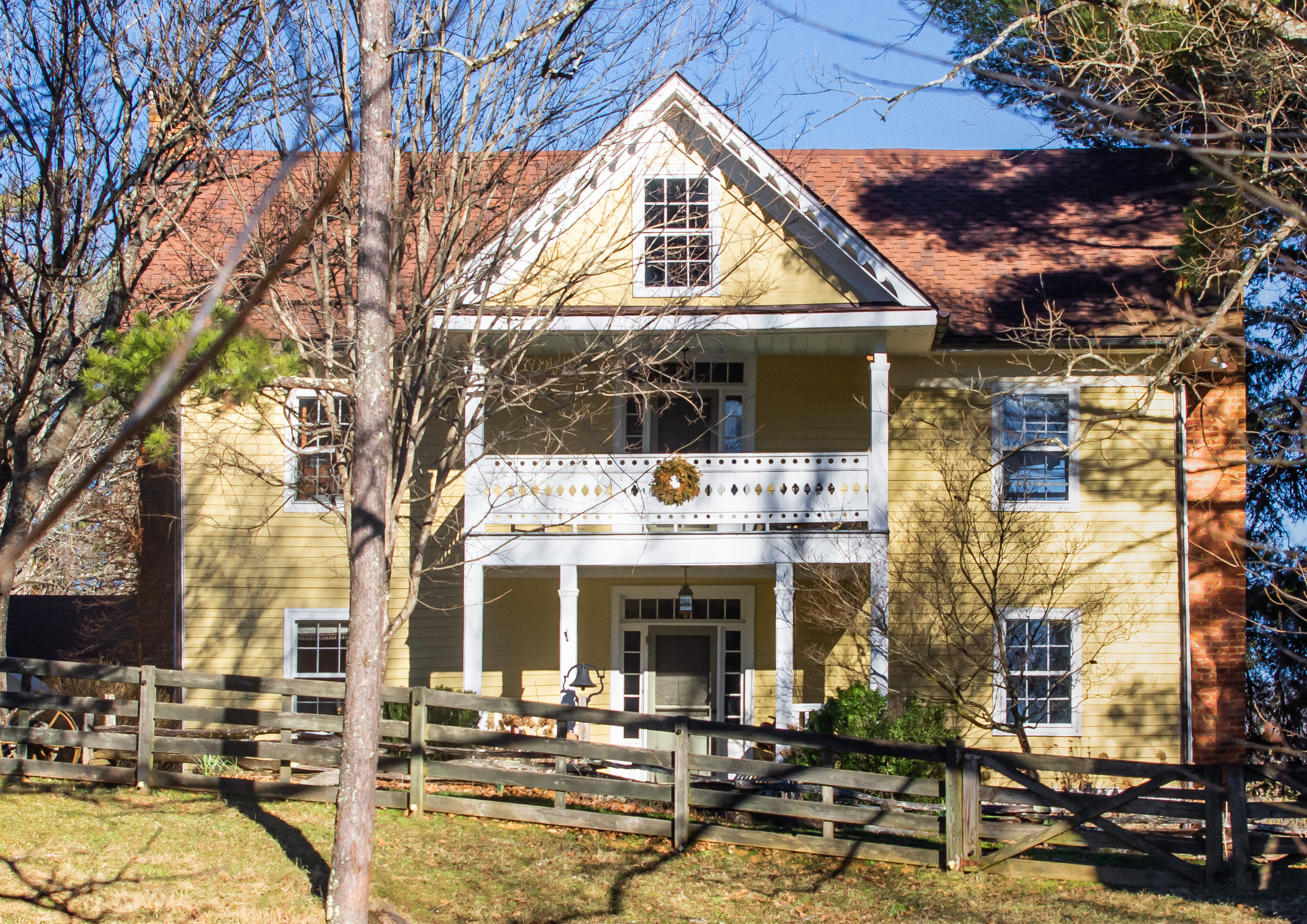

- Location within North Carolina Location within the United States
- Location: 45 Richmond Hill Rd., Asheville, North Carolina
- Coordinates: 35°36′40″N 82°34′50″W
- Area: 7.5 acres (3.0 ha)
- Built: 1889
- Architect: James G. Hill
- Architectural style: Queen Anne
- NRHP reference No.: 77000992
- Added to NRHP: August 16, 1977

The Richmond Hill House was a historic home located at 45 Richmond Hill Rd. in Asheville, North Carolina. It was built in 1889 and was designed by James G. Hill in the Queen Anne style. The house sat on a 7.5-acre (3.0 ha) property. It was demolished on February 1, 2012.

It was listed on the National Register of Historic Places in 1977.
