= James G. Hill =

American architect

James G. Hill (1841–1913) was an American architect who, during the period 1876 to 1883, headed the Office of the Supervising Architect of the United States Department of the Treasury, which oversaw major Federal buildings.

During that period he designed or supervised design of many courthouses, post offices and other public buildings.

During 1884–1901 he worked alone as a private architect, and during 1901–1909 he worked with Frederick A. Kendall as partner. From December 1878 to May 1879, Hill was suspended from his office while being investigated for fraud, with John Fraser serving as acting Supervising Architect in Hill's absence. Acquitted, Hill was immediately restored to his position.

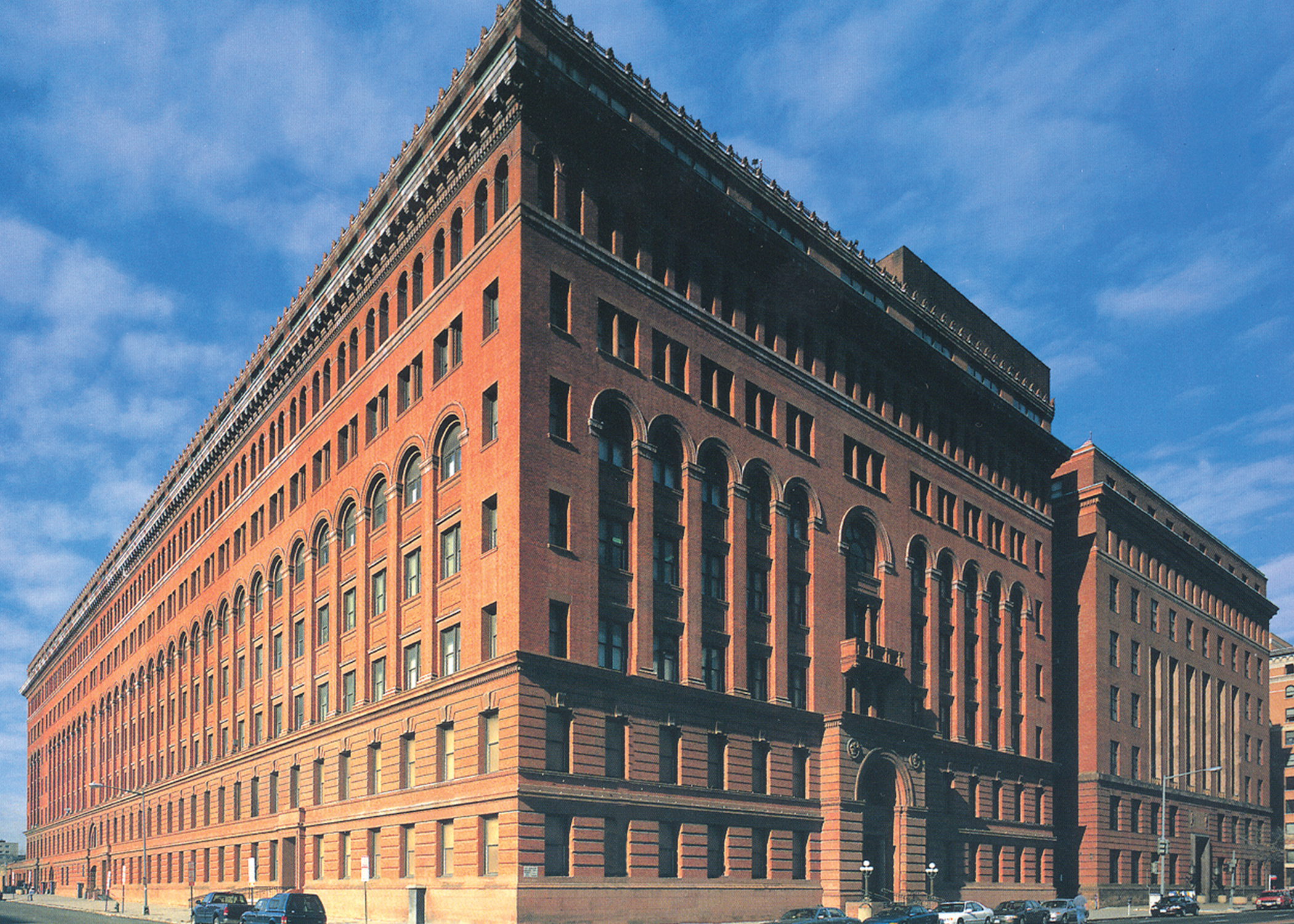
Government Publishing Office, Washington, DC

Works associated with Hill include:

- Atlantic Building, 928-30 F Street, NW, Washington, DC; built 1887–1888
- Sidney R. Yates Federal Building (originally the Bureau of Engraving and Printing), 14th St. and Independence Ave. Washington, DC, NRHP-listed; built 1878–1880
- Government Printing Office, North Capitol Street between G and H Streets, NW, Washington, DC
- National Bank of Washington, Washington Branch, 301 7th St., N.W. Washington, DC, NRHP-listed
- Old Post Office, State Street and Broadway, Albany, New York (NRHP listed)
- Richmond Hill House, 45 Richmond Hill Rd. Asheville, North Carolina, NRHP-listed
- Riggs National Bank, Washington Loan and Trust Company Branch, SW corner of 9th and F Sts., NW. Washington, DC, NRHP-listed
- St. Margaret's Church, 1820 Connecticut Avenue, Washington, DC; built in 1895; Hill is credited with design work done for construction in 1900.
- Security Storage, 1140 15th Street, NW, Washington, DC; built 1890; demolished 1965

Preceded by William Appleton Potter	Office of the Supervising Architect; 1877–1883	Succeeded by Mifflin E. Bell
