= National Bank of Washington, Washington Branch =

- U.S. National Register of Historic Places
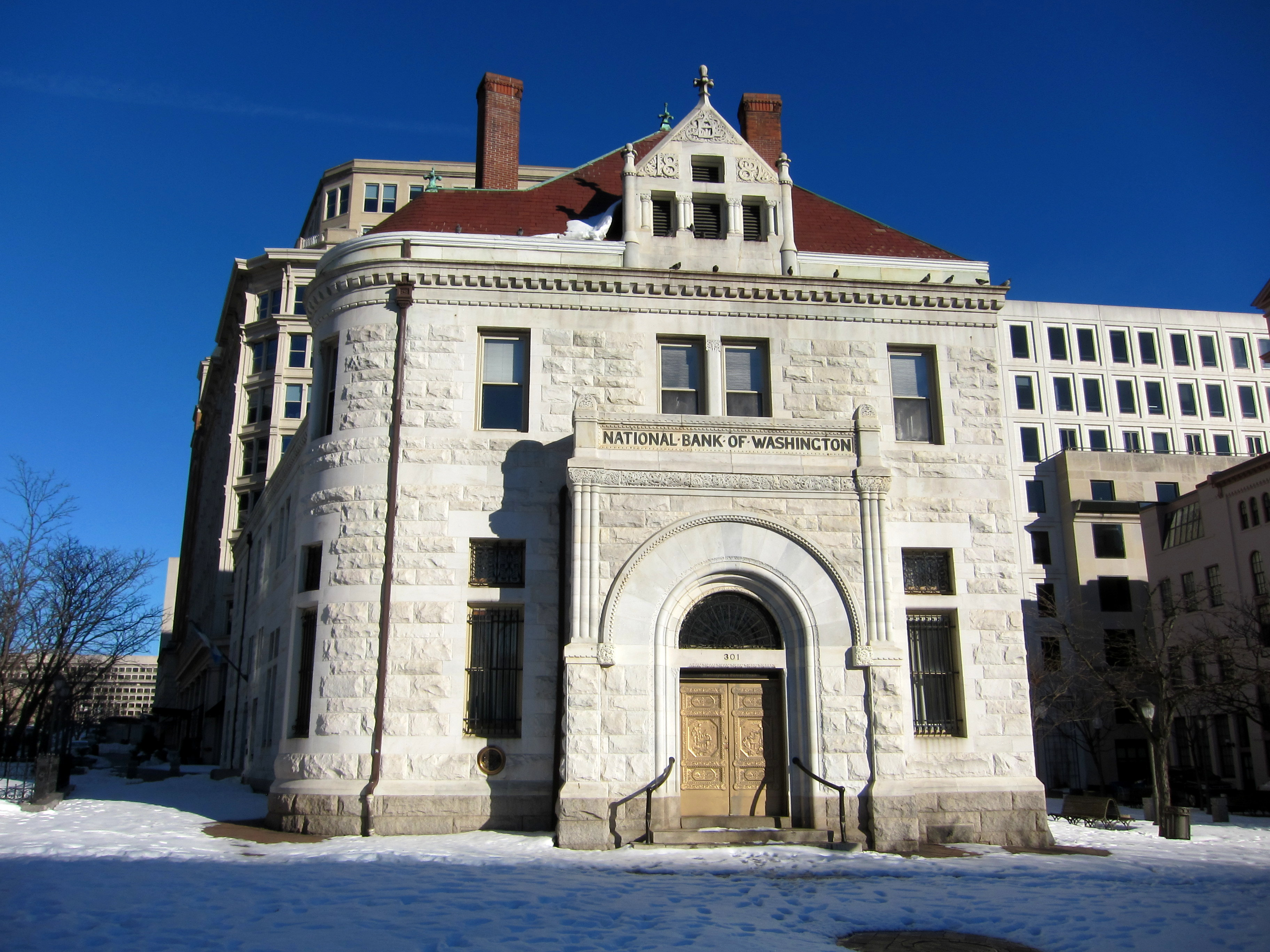
- National Bank of Washington, Washington Branch in 2016

- Location within Central Washington, D.C. Location within the District of Columbia Location within the United States
- Location: 301 7th St., N.W., Washington, District of Columbia
- Coordinates: 38°53′37.6″N 77°1′16.1″W
- Area: 0.2 acres (0.081 ha)
- Built: 1888
- Architect: James G. Hill, Daniel J. Macarty
- Architectural style: Richardsonian Romanesque
- NRHP reference No.: 74002169
- Added to NRHP: May 8, 1974

The Washington Branch of the National Bank of Washington is an historic bank building located in Northwest, Washington, D.C.

== History ==
The building was built in 1888 as a branch of The Bank of Washington. It was designed by James G. Hill and Daniel J. Macarty.

It was documented by the Historic American Buildings Survey.

In 1974, it was added to the National Register of Historic Places for its Romanesque and Richardsonian Romanesque architecture.
