= See America First =

Comic opera and book

- A Patriotic Comic Opera
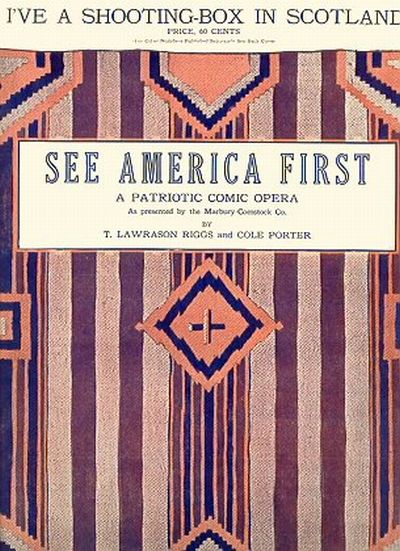
- Sheet music cover
- Music: Cole Porter
- Lyrics: Cole Porter
- Book: T. Lawrason Riggs
- Productions: 1916 Broadway

See America First is a comic opera with a book by T. Lawrason Riggs and music and lyrics by Cole Porter. The first work by Porter to be produced on Broadway, it was a critical and commercial flop.

== Background ==
Porter and Riggs, classmates at Yale University, wanted to write a spoof of the patriotic George M. Cohan musicals that were popular at the time. They completed the bulk of their work at the Riggs home in New London, Connecticut, and the script underwent extensive changes between its first draft and the New York opening. Four of the songs were interpolated from the 1914 Yale revue Paranoia, or Chester of the Y.D.A.

== Plot ==
Set in Arizona, the story focuses on Polly Huggins, whose xenophobic father, the wealthy United States Senator Huggins, sends her to a West Coast finishing school with the hope she will find a suitable husband. Polly, however, hopes to snare an English duke with whom she once exchanged furtive glances at a London opera house. Unbeknownst to her, the cowboy who is wooing her actually is her dream man, the Duke, in disguise. They become engaged. Polly's father is willing to adjust his principles when he falls in love with Sarah, the chaperone at her school.

== Production ==
See America First was produced by Elisabeth Marbury, directed by J. H. Benrimo, and choreographed by Edward Hutchinson and Theodore Kosloff. Anne Morgan, the daughter of J. P. Morgan, and interior decorator Elsie de Wolfe were among its financial backers. Prior to opening on Broadway, it was staged in Schenectady, Albany, and Rochester in Upstate New York, New Haven, Connecticut, and Providence, Rhode Island.

The Broadway production opened on March 28, 1916 at the Maxine Elliott Theatre. The cast included Dorothie Bigelow as Polly, Sam Edwards as her father, Clara Palmer as Sarah, John Heath Goldsworthy as Cecil, and Clifton Webb as Percy. The evening before, Marbury had hosted a gala performance for her society friends and business associates, all of whom were enthusiastic about the show, but the critics were far less enchanted and it closed after only 15 performances. Bigelow laid the blame for its failure on Riggs and his book, while he in turn insisted it was due largely "to the fact that the composer and I consented to complete transformation of the piece to meet the capabilities of its interpreters and the supposed taste of the public." In a letter to Yale's alumni magazine, Riggs, who had invested $35,000 in the production of the show, announced he was giving up musical theatre as a vocation. He converted to Catholicism, became a priest, and eventually was assigned to the university as a chaplain.

Despite the quick demise of See America First, G. Schirmer published sheet music for thirteen of its twenty songs, and the Joseph C. Smith Orchestra recorded "When I Used to Lead the Ballet" (which had been written for The Pot of Gold in 1912) and "I've a Shooting Box in Scotland" for Victor. It was the first commercial recording of a Porter tune.

== Song list ==
Act I

- Indian Girls' Chant
- Badmen
- To Follow Every Fancy
- Indian Maidens' Chorus
- Something's Got to Be Done
- I've Got an Awful Lot to Learn
- Beautiful, Primitive Indian Girls
- Hold-Up Ensemble
- See America First
- The Language of Flowers
- Damsel, Damsel (Prithee Come Crusading with Me)
- The Lady I've Vowed to Wed
- Hail the Female Relative

Act II

- Mirror, Mirror
- Ever and Ever Yours
- Lima
- Will You Love Me (When My Flivver Is a Wreck)?
- Buy Her a Box at the Opera
- I've a Shooting Box in Scotland
- When I Used to Lead the Ballet

== Critical reception ==
The theatre critic for the New York Dramatic Mirror observed, "The lyrics are studiously copied after the Gilbertian pattern in the long and complicated rhyme effects achieved. The music, however, gives the impression that its composer, after the first hour, gave up the task of recreating a Sullivan atmosphere, preferring to seek his inspiration in our own George M. Cohan," whose musical style Porter intentionally had been trying to emulate.

The New York Herald wrote that "its plot is silly, its music unimpressive" and suggested "it would be delightful as a college play . . . with the audience consisting of fond relatives." The critic for The New York Tribune observed that "Gotham is a big town and it may be that the sisters, aunts, and cousins of its Yale men will be sufficient to guarantee prosperity for See America First."
