= The Bank of Washington =

The National Bank of Washington
- Industry: Banking
- Founded: 1809; 217 years ago
- Defunct: 1990; 36 years ago
- Fate: Bank failure; Acquired by Riggs Bank
- Headquarters: Washington, DC

The Bank of Washington, later named The National Bank of Washington and abbreviated as NBW, was the first bank established in Washington, D.C. After suffering from bank failure in 1990, the bank was acquired by Riggs Bank.

== History ==
The bank was chartered in 1809. Daniel Carroll of Duddington was the first president of the bank.

The bank lent $350,000, more than two-thirds of its capital, to the United States Government during the War of 1812.

The bank was initially located on Capitol Hill but in 1828, it moved to a building on 6th Street and Pennsylvania Avenue.

In 1821, the bank launched a "savings fund" offering depositors a rate of 4%.

In 1888, the National Bank of Washington, Washington Branch was constructed.

In 1907, the bank acquired Central National Bank.

In 1949, the United Mine Workers acquired a 76% ownership interest in the bank.

In 1954, the bank acquired Hamilton National Bank, in 1957, it acquired Liberty National Bank, and in 1960, it acquired Anacostia National Bank.

In 1980, Luther H. Hodges Jr. took over leadership of the bank.

In 1985, Hodges convinced the United Mine Workers to sell control of the bank to Colson Inc., an investment group led by Hodges.

In 1988, 3 directors of the bank challenged the leadership of Hodges, who owned 3% of the bank.

In 1990, Hodges resigned. Later that year, as a result of bank failure, the bank was seized by the Office of the Comptroller of the Currency. The bank was acquired by Riggs Bank. As part of the bank failure, the Federal Deposit Insurance Corporation (FDIC) covered losses on the $37 million of deposits at a subsidiary of the bank in The Bahamas.

In 1991, the FDIC sued John J. Mason, chairman of the bank, for failing to repay a $9 million loan made to him by the bank in April 1987 and for transferring nearly $5 million of assets into an account that officials could not touch.
