= Armed Forces Retirement Home =

Facilities that house retired US military service members

Coordinates: 38°56′4″N 77°0′28″W

Armed Forces Retirement Home are two Old Soldiers' retirement homes, one in Gulfport, Mississippi, the other in Washington, D.C., that house veterans and retired members of the United States Armed Forces.

== History ==
Throughout the seventeenth and eighteenth centuries from New England to the Carolinas, laws were passed by the colonies to provide for the injured and wounded volunteer colonial soldiers back from the Indian Wars on the frontier. During the American Revolution, both the states and the Continental Congress made provision for disability pensions, but Congress was reluctant to fund so-called half-pay-for-life service pensions for commissioned officers, because they wanted no part of "Standing Armies," or "Career Soldiers" and had no money in any event. In the end, Congress agreed to pay the Officers the equivalent of five years pay at the end of their service, and enlisted people got $80.

From that time until 1885 there were no retirement pensions for either commissioned officers or enlisted personnel. Finally, in 1885, retirement plans were provided for enlisted Army and enlisted Marines. Navy enlisted had to wait until 1899 for a retirement pension. The absence of retirement pensions drove efforts to establish homes for the disabled and decrepit soldiers and sailors.

=== Naval Home ===
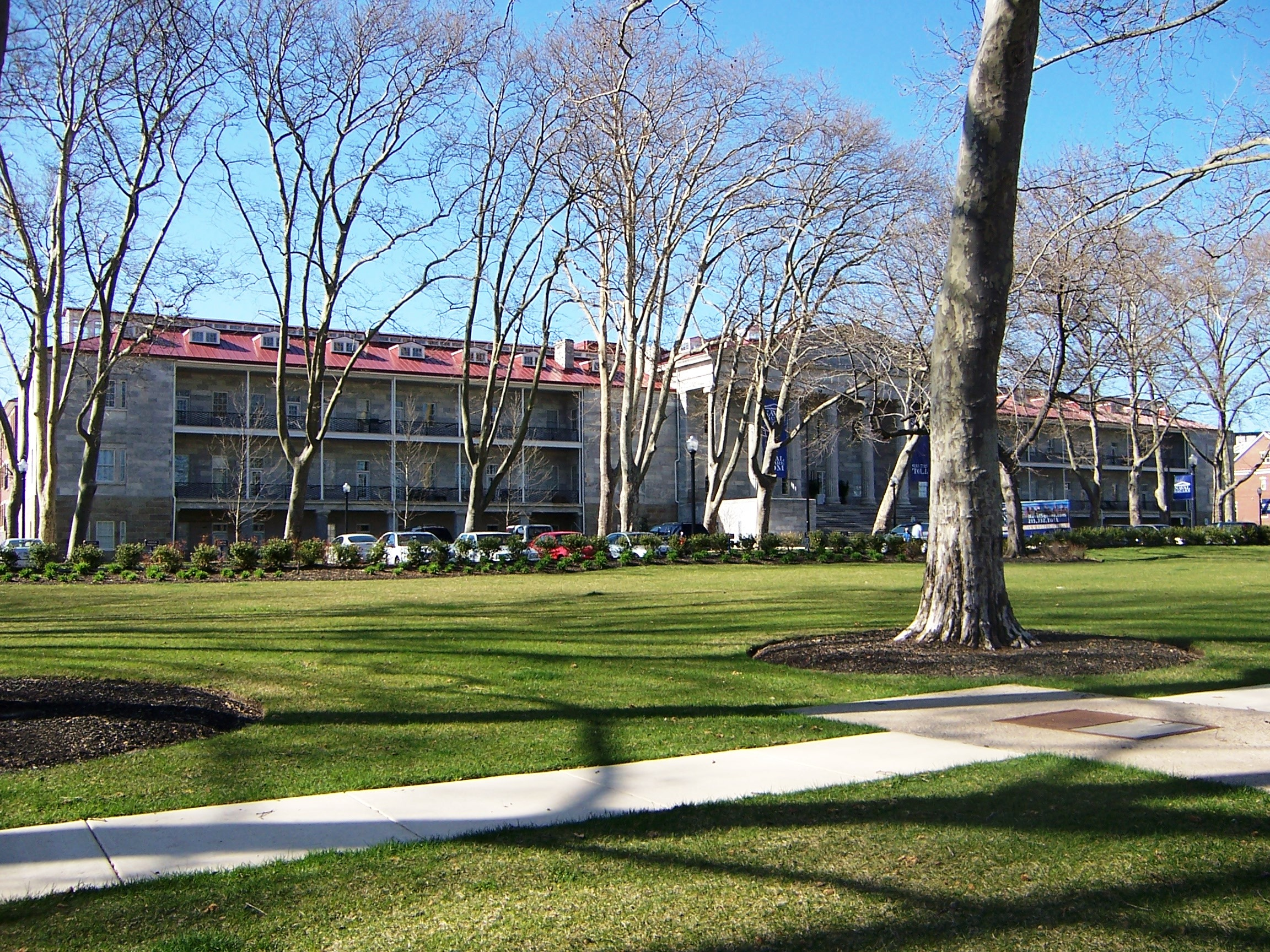
Biddle Hall

On 26 February 1811 Congress passed an act authorizing construction of U.S. Naval Hospitals which included the phrase "... to provide a permanent asylum for disabled and decrepit navy officers, seamen, and marines." The addition of an "Asylum" (meaning "refuge") was in lieu of a retirement or service pension for naval personnel. This act eventually resulted in the purchase of the Pemberton Estate in 1826 for $17,000, which came with a large mansion to be used as a hospital, and the decision to construct a new building for an asylum. William Strickland was selected as Architect and Contractor to build the Philadelphia Naval Asylum. What was to become Biddle Hall was completed in 1834. "The entire cost of the building, excluding the finishing of the attics, was $195,600: about four-ninths of which came from the Treasury directly, the remainder from the Hospital Fund." These Treasury funds were required because the Hospital Fund had gotten into trouble in the 1820s when the Trustee's elected to invest fund assets in private equities rather than Treasury Bonds. From that time to the present, Naval Home Trust Funds have only invested with the U.S. Treasury. When the U.S. Soldiers' Home and Trust Fund was created in 1851, some of its funds were invested in bonds issued by the states of Virginia and Missouri, from which little or no interest was received during the Civil War, and in the future the Soldiers' Home Trust Fund would also only be invested with Treasury.

Biddle Hall was used to house not only the home for pensioners, but the Asylum staff, a Naval Hospital, an insane asylum and a School for Naval Midshipmen, the predecessor of the Naval Academy at Annapolis. Some of the residents of the Asylum were buried on the grounds of the Asylum, and then reburied at Mount Moriah Cemetery following the Civil War. The number of "Inmates" varied over the long history of the Philadelphia Home, beginning with five in 1834, going to 220 in 1885, and 204 on 1 July 1921. Residents were provided with a small private room, furnished with simple furniture, to which they could add their own furniture. Structural defects noted by Lieutenant Commander George Stockton in his 1886 paper on the Naval Home included the home basement, described as "low and damp" with insufficient drainage, The rooms in the attic were too hot for comfort, and asking the old and decrepit to climb up and down three flights of stairs from attic to the improperly placed dining commons in the basement was difficult for some of the inmates.

=== Soldiers' Home ===
The United States Soldiers' Homes was authorized by Congress in 1851. In 1827, while the Naval Asylum was under construction, Secretary of War James Barbour recommended that an Army Asylum be constructed for soldiers. For the next twenty years people like Major Robert Anderson promoted the idea of homes for retired soldiers, without success. The problem was to develop a system of funding a Soldiers' Home that would not involve any expenditure of public money. In 1846, he wrote to all the regiments in the active army, asking for information on fines and forfeitures from Courts Martial. He got answers from about half the regiments, added the twenty cents a month for the hospital fund received from the 9,438 enlisted soldiers then on active duty, and was able to estimate the annual revenue from both sources at $42,642, which turned out to be on the low side. "He computed the annual cost of each member, using the Army clothing allowance of that year of $15.36, and the annual cost of one year's ration at the prevailing rate of ten cents a day, to arrive at an annual cost for each member for these two items, of $51.86."

On 14 September 1847 General Winfield Scott received the surrender of Mexico City, and accepted a "contribution" of $150,000 in gold from the Mexico City fathers "in lieu of pillage." Of this money, $118,791.19 was deposited on his orders in a New York bank with the notation "for Army Asylum." This action outraged the Secretary of War: he accused Gen. Scott of larceny under Art. 58 of the Articles of War, but Scott refused to turn the money over to the Treasury, and in the end he won.

- Article 58 of Articles of War, 1806: All public stores taken in the enemy's camp towns forts or magazines whether of artillery ammunition clothing forage or provisions shall be secured for the service of the United States for the neglect of which the commanding officer is to be answerable.

In 1851, Senator Jefferson Davis of Mississippi sponsored a bill to establish "at a suitable place or places, a site or sites for the Military Asylum." The bill passed both Houses and was signed into law by President Millard Fillmore the same day. The new Board of Commissioners decided to establish four homes, one each in New Orleans, Louisiana; East Pascagoula, Mississippi; Harrodsburg, Kentucky; and Washington, D.C.

=== Current status ===
In 1991 Congress incorporated the U.S. Naval Home (opened in 1834) and U.S. Soldiers' and Airmen's Home (founded in 1851) into an independent establishment of the Executive Branch of the Federal Government named the Armed Forces Retirement Home (AFRH) Agency. In 2002, the names of the two homes were officially changed to The Armed Forces Retirement Home – Gulfport and The Armed Forces Retirement Home – Washington.

As of 2019 almost 900 men and women, with an average age in the eighties, reside at the homes. Residents are free to come and go as they please. Meals are served in the Dining Halls three times daily. Medical services are available on-site. Career military personnel have priority. Enlisted, Warrant Officers, and Limited Duty Officers with a minimum of twenty years of service at age 60, veterans incapable of earning a livelihood because of a service-connected disability incurred in the line of duty, veterans who served in a War Zone or Hostile Fire Zone and are later found to be incapable of earning a livelihood, and women veterans who served before 12 June 1948, may be eligible.

== Funding ==
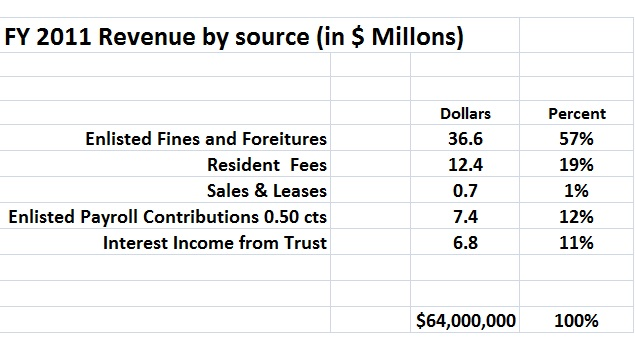
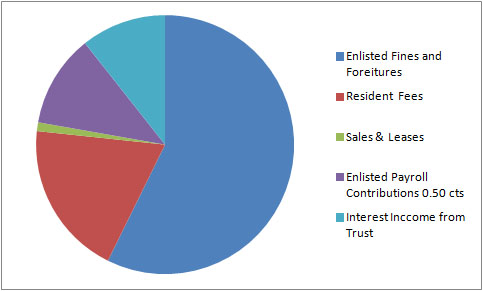

The current legal basis for funding of the Armed Forces Retirement Home Agency is contained in 24 USC § 419 – Armed Forces Retirement Home Trust Fund:

- Such amounts as may be transferred to the Fund.
- Moneys deposited in the Fund by the Chief Operating Officer realized from gifts or from the disposition of property and facilities.
- Amounts deposited in the Fund as monthly fees paid by residents of the Retirement Home under section 414 of this title.
- Amounts of fines and forfeitures deposited in the Fund under section 2772 of title 10.
- Amounts deposited in the Fund as deductions from the pay of enlisted members, warrant officers, and limited duty officers under section 1007(i) of title 37.
- Interest from investments made under subsection (c) of this section.

Other sources of income have been used in the past. At one time a small percentage of the Prize Money awarded for the capture of enemy war ships and pirate vessels, was awarded to the Naval Home Trust Fund. A notation in the "Congressional Record for the Navy Affairs Committee" in 1907–09 notes that the Naval Home Trust still had a balance of $14 million partly from the capture of Prize Vessels, per an Act of 1870, and from suits for depredation of timber belonging to the United States.

== AFRH and the Department of Veterans Affairs ==
"When the Civil War began on April 12, 1861, it is estimated America had 80,000 Veterans from previous conflicts, some of whom were treated at a handful of Veterans homes scattered across the nation. The Civil War added more than 1.9 million Soldiers, Sailors, and Marines to the rolls." The U.S. Soldiers Home and the Philadelphia Naval Home were completely inadequate to this challenge: thus the "National Asylum for Disabled Volunteer Soldiers," a system of eleven homes with attached hospitals that were built across the country between 1865 and 1930. These institutions, the foundation of the Department of Veterans Affairs (VA), today have the mission of "hospitalization and rehabilitation and return, as soon as possible, of veterans to civilian life ..." The VA provides representatives to sit on the "Armed Forces Home Trust Fund." Otherwise, the Armed Forces Retirement Home, an agency of the Department of Defense, has no connection whatever to the VA, beyond the historical one, and is today primarily a retirement home.

== Notable buildings ==
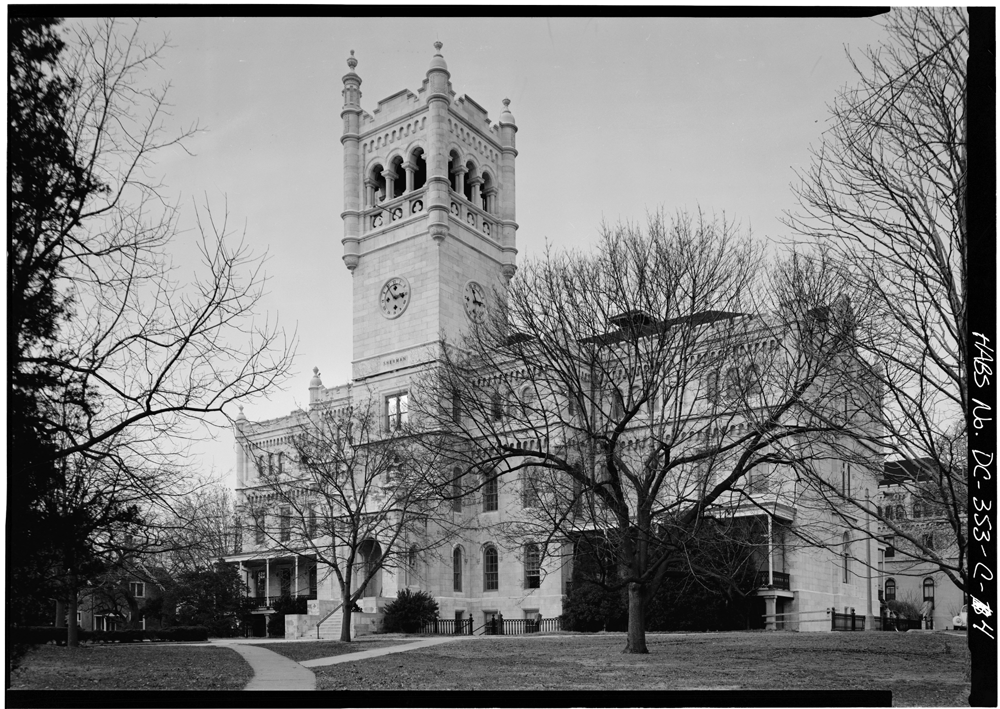
Scott Building

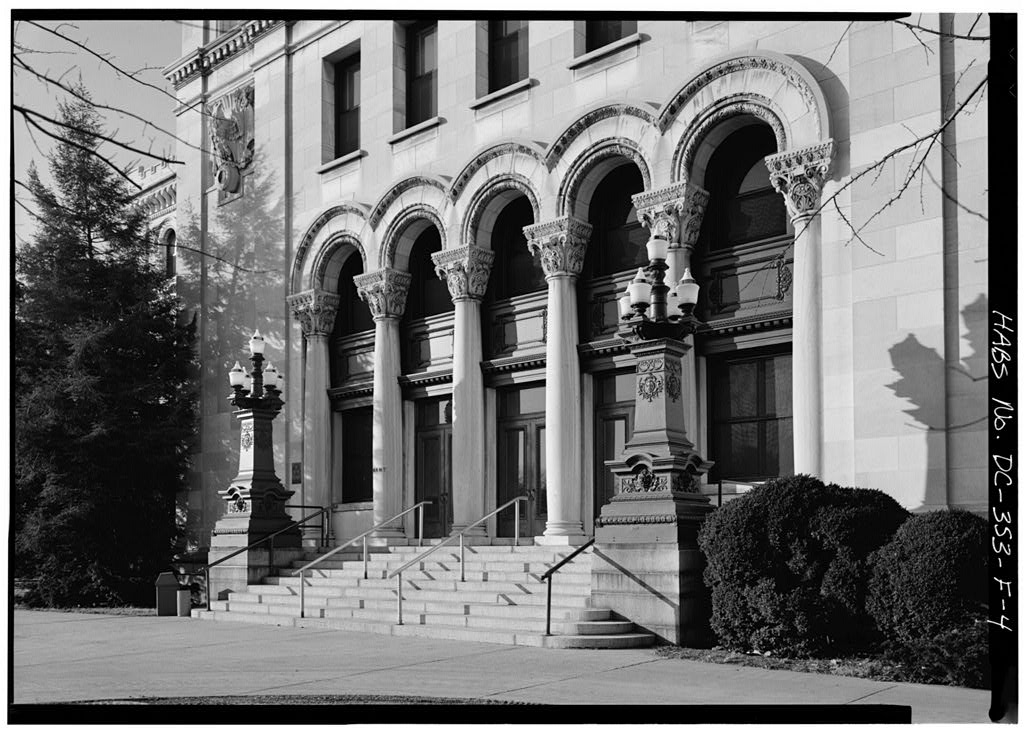
Grant Building

The Soldiers' Home occupies a campus in Northwest, Washington, D.C. adjacent to Rock Creek Cemetery and United States Soldiers' and Airmen's Home National Cemetery. Four of the buildings date to the home's earliest days before the Civil War, and have been designated a National Historic Landmark.

=== Anderson Cottage ===
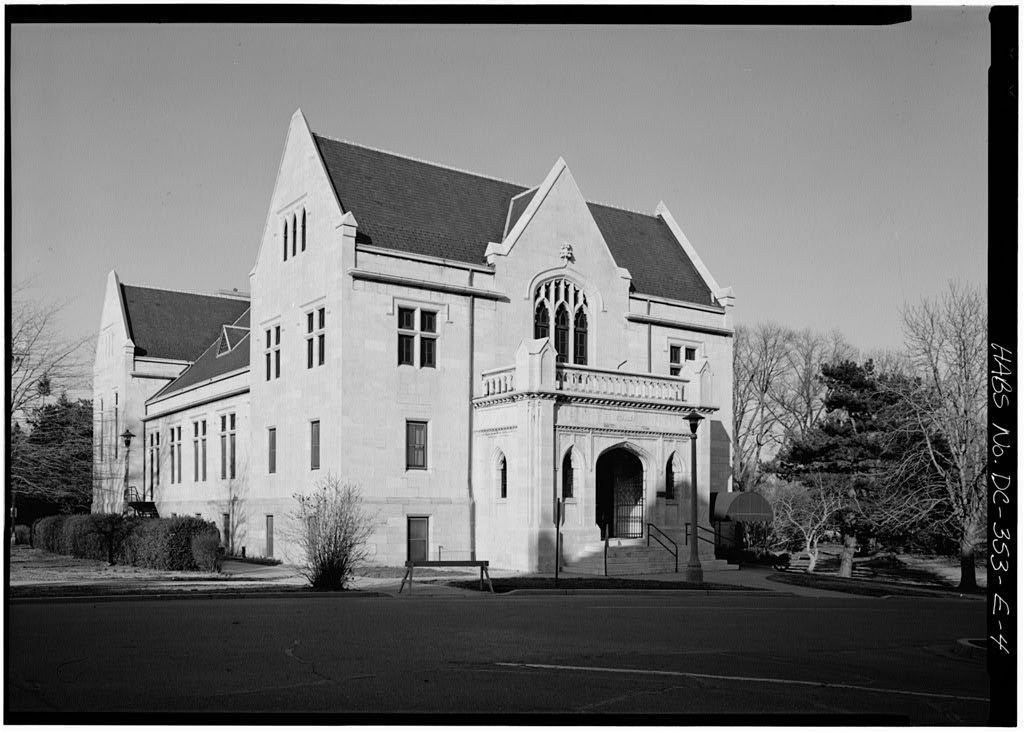
Stanley Hall Chapel

Built in 1843 by the banker George Washington Riggs as a summer cottage for his family, it was a part of the first parcel acquired by the U.S. Military Asylum. Renamed Anderson Cottage for co-founder Major Robert Anderson it housed the first residents of the home. It is now known as President Lincoln's Cottage, and has been a National Monument since 2000. The brick house has a stucco exterior.

=== Scott Building ===
Begun in 1852 and completed in the 1890s, Scott Building is named for General Winfield Scott. The initial design for the building was in the Norman Gothic style. It housed 100–200 residents. Its castellated clock tower was used as a watch tower during the American Civil War, especially during General Jubal Early's raid on nearby Fort Stevens. The building was closed due to damage from the 2011 earthquake. The new, rebuilt Scott building opened in 2013.

=== Sherman Building ===
Built to a design by Barton S. Alexander in the 1850s, the Sherman Building is connected to the Scott Building by a central annex. Its exterior is unfinished white marble.

=== Stanley Hall ===
Built in 1834, this was a recreation center and is now the Home's Chapel.

=== Sheridan Building ===
This building, begun in 1883, was built as a dormitory. It has three stories and is built of red brick.

=== Grant Building ===
Begun in 1911, the Grant Building was built as a barracks, mess hall, and recreation center.
