= William Wilson Corcoran =

American banker (1798–1888)

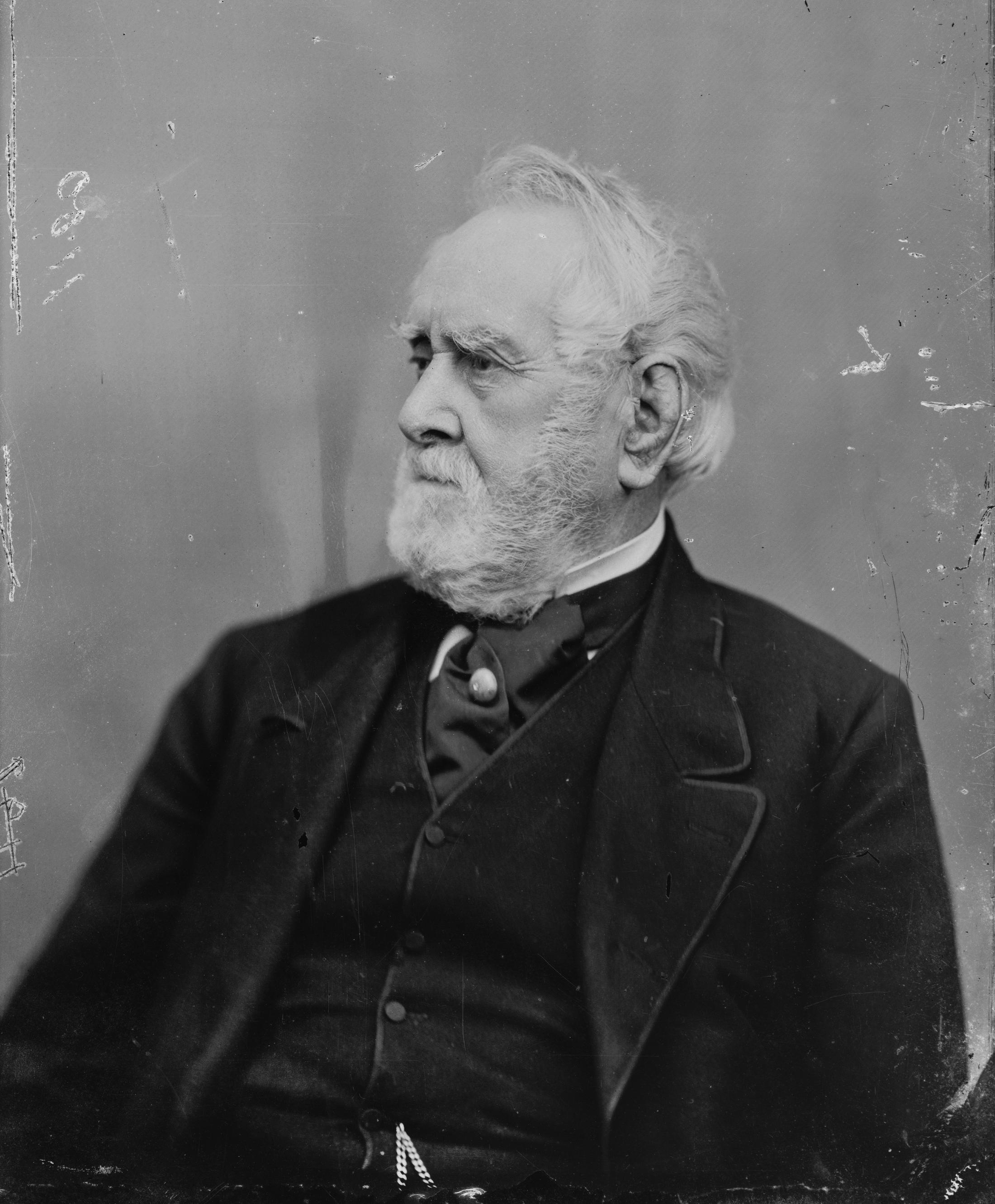
- Corcoran in the late 19th century
- Born: December 27, 1798; Georgetown, D.C., U.S.
- Died: February 24, 1888 (aged 89); Washington, D.C., U.S.
- Resting place: Oak Hill Cemetery; Washington, D.C., U.S.
- Education: Georgetown College
- Occupations: Banker, philanthropist, and art collector
- Spouse: Louise Morris (m. 1835; died 1840)
- Children: 3
- Parent(s): Thomas Corcoran; Hannah Lemmon

William Wilson Corcoran (December 27, 1798 – February 24, 1888) was an American banker, philanthropist, and art collector. He founded the Corcoran Gallery of Art in Washington, D.C.

== Early life and education ==
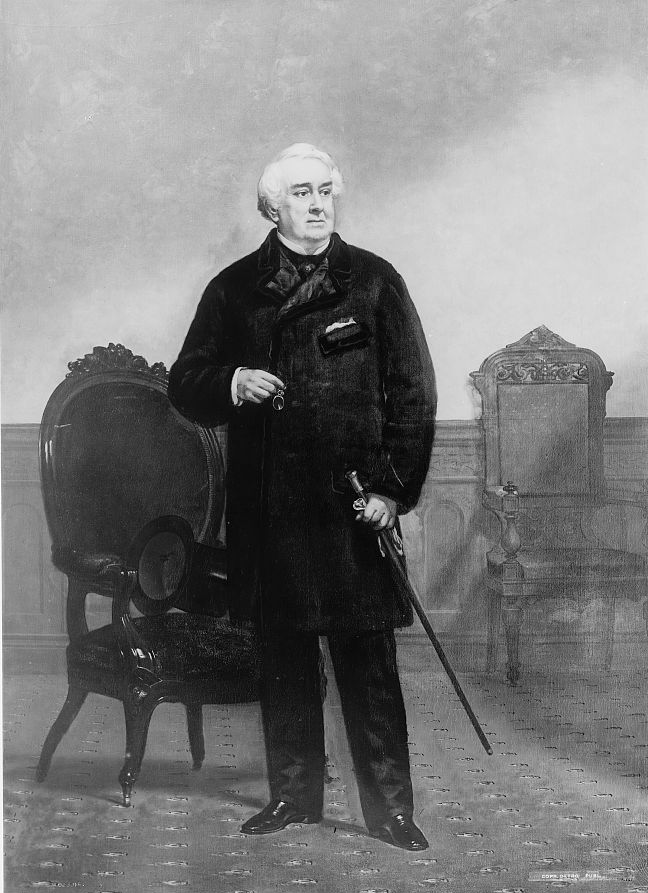
Corcoran in 1867

Corcoran was born on December 27, 1798, in Georgetown in Washington, D.C., one of 12 children (six boys and six girls), six of whom survived to maturity. His father was Thomas Corcoran, a well-to-do merchant twice elected as mayor of Georgetown, and his mother was Hannah Lemmon. Thomas was born in Ireland, settled in Georgetown in 1788, and established a leather business.

William Corcoran was raised in Georgetown, where he studied classics and mathematics at local private schools run by Alexander Kirk and the Reverend Addison Belt. He attended classes for a year at Georgetown College, and then joined the family business.

== Career ==
Corcoran entered business at age 17, working in dry goods store owned by two brothers and opened his own branch store two years later. The Corcoran brothers established a wholesale auction and commission business, but their ventures failed after the Panic of 1819.

He worked in another family business, and in 1828, he took control of a large amount of real estate from his father.

Corcoran was employed as a clerk at the Bank of Columbia at Georgetown branch, and then as a real estate and loan manager at the Second Bank of the United States in Washington.

In 1837, Corcoran established a brokerage firm on Pennsylvania Avenue at 15th Street. He was successful and in 1840 entered into a partnership with George Washington Riggs, a son of Elisha Riggs. The Corcoran and Riggs private banking firm enjoyed the patronage of Treasury Secretary Levi Woodbury and prospered after it re-sold to investors $5 million (~$173 million in 2025) of US Treasury notes in 1843. In 1845, it purchased the former Second Bank of the United States building located on 15th Street at New York Avenue.

In Spring 1847, Corcoran and Riggs sold to investors at home and abroad the bulk of two issues of the US Treasury Mexican War bonds; Corcoran's earnings were $1 million. In 1854, Corcoran retired from Corcoran and Riggs to focus on his investments in real estate, land grants, armaments, railroads, as well as pursue pleasure and philanthropic endeavors.

=== Art ===
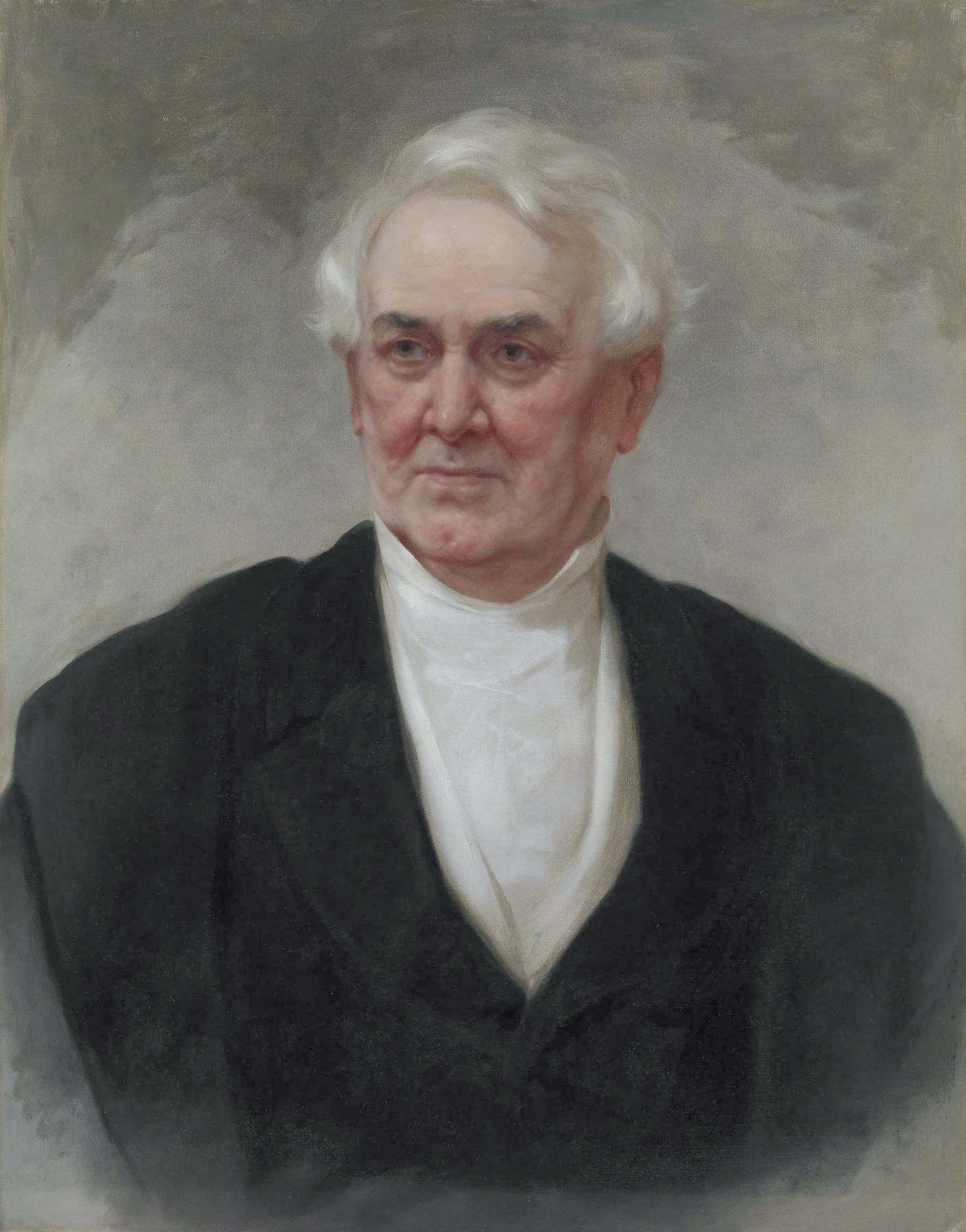
Portrait of Corcoran by William Oliver Stone

In contrast to many contemporary art patrons, Corcoran was not exclusively interested in European works, and he assembled one of the first important collections of American art.

In 1851 Corcoran purchased the second marble version of American sculptor Hiram Powers scandalous statue "The Greek Slave" and considered it his most prized acquisition. By the mid-1850s his pictures and sculpture were overflowing his mansion on Lafayette Square and in 1859 he hired the foremost architect of the day, James Renwick, to build a picture gallery in the Second Empire style on Pennsylvania Avenue.

Before the gallery was ready, however, the Civil War began, and Corcoran, a Southern sympathizer, left Washington for Paris, where his son-in-law, George Eustis Jr., was a representative of the Confederacy. The half-finished building designed by Renwick was taken over by the US government and used as a supply depot.

When the war was over, Corcoran returned to Washington. The building was finished in 1869. The Corcoran Gallery of Art opened in 1874, but the structure was soon outgrown. A new building for the Corcoran Gallery of Art and its nascent school of art (now the Corcoran College of Art + Design) was designed by American architect Ernest Flagg in the Beaux-Arts style and completed in 1897, nine years after Corcoran's death. The façade of the building reflects the "Neo-Grec," an offshoot of Beaux-Arts that attempted to reflect the functions of the building by revealing detailed and decorative accents on the exterior. The Corcoran Gallery's first home is now the Renwick Gallery, a Smithsonian museum.

=== Philanthropy ===
In 1854, after his retirement, he devoted himself and his substantial fortune to art and philanthropy. In 1848, Corcoran had purchased 15 acres (6 ha) of land for Oak Hill Cemetery, which overlooks Rock Creek Park. He organized the Oak Hill Cemetery Company to oversee the cemetery, which was formally incorporated by Act of Congress on March 3, 1849. Corcoran paid for the construction of a Gothic Revival chapel in Oak Hill Cemetery, commonly known as the Renwick Chapel. It is the only building designed by Renwick in Washington other than Corcoran's original museum (see below), the first ("Castle") building on the Washington Mall of the Smithsonian Institution, and St. Mary's Church in Foggy Bottom (see below).

Corcoran also established a $10,000 fund, administered by the Benevolent Society, to purchase firewood for the poor in Georgetown. Corcoran also gave many gifts to several universities, including The George Washington University, the Maryland Agricultural College, the College of William and Mary, and Washington and Lee University. Corcoran also contributed to a fund to purchase George Washington's Mount Vernon estate, after his family could no longer keep it up, and the federal government refused to purchase it. One of William Wilson Corcoran's longtime business associate and friend was the renowned George Peabody.

Corcoran made many other important bequests to the people of Washington, including several departments of the Columbian University (now the George Washington University), and the land and half the construction costs for what is now the Church of the Ascension and Saint Agnes. Corcoran was also the president of the Corporation of Columbian (George Washington) University. Early in 1883, Corcoran arranged to have the body of John Howard Payne returned to the United States, an expense he personally bore. Payne, actor, poet, and author of "Home! Sweet Home!" had been the United States Consul to the Bey of Tunis in 1852 and had died there. Payne had been good friends of Corcoran and his business partner, George W. Riggs, in 1850, prior to Payne's second appointment as Consul to Tunis.

Corcoran also established in 1869 the Louise Home for Women—named in memory of his deceased wife—to help support and maintain impoverished women. The home opened in 1871 on Massachusetts Ave. NW, between 15th and 16th Streets, in Washington, D.C., where it operated until 1947; the original building was razed in 1949. The Louise Home moved to the Codman House at Decatur Place and 22nd Street NW and in 1976 merged operations with the Abraham and Laura Lisner Home for Aged Women. As of 2021, the Louise Home continues to operate as part of the Lisner-Louise-Dickson-Hurt Home.

=== Slavery ===
Corcoran held at least one person, Mary, as a slave. In the 1930s, George Peabody referred to Corcoran as being involved in the slave trade. However, in at least one letter to his wife, Corcoran expressed sympathy for abolitionists, and in 1845 he manumitted Mary and her four young children. In 1851, Corcoran provided funds to help buy the freedom of an enslaved person who had been recaptured eight years after first escaping slavery.

== Personal life ==
At the age of 35, he fell in love with Louise Morris, who was the daughter of Commodore Charles Morris (1784–1856) and the older sister of Robert Murray Morris (1824–1896), then "barely in her teens". In 1835, Corcoran eloped and married Louise, born in 1818. Before his wife's early death from tuberculosis on November 21, 1840, they had three children, however, only one survived into adulthood:

- Harriet Louise Corcoran (1836–1837), who died in infancy.
- Louise Morris Corcoran (1838–1867), who married George Eustis, Jr. (1828–1872) in 1859.
- Charles Morris Corcoran (1840–1841), who also died in infancy.

Corcoran joined the Potomac Lodge No. 5 of Free and Accepted Masons in Georgetown and was raised as a Master Mason on July 26, 1827.

== Death ==
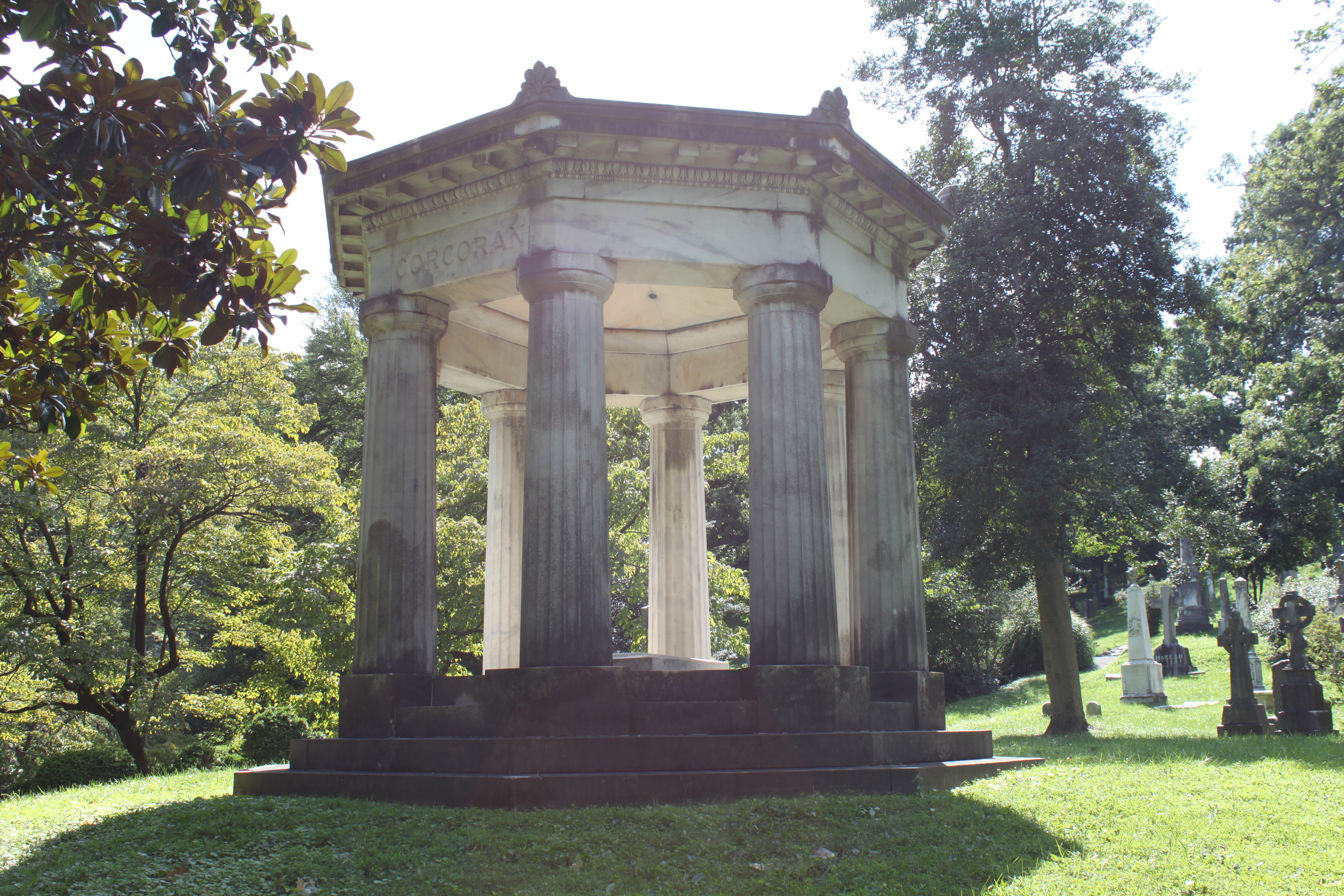
Corcoran's grave in Oak Hill Cemetery

After his wife died in 1840, Corcoran chose not to marry again. He died on February 24, 1888, in Washington, D.C., and is buried in Oak Hill Cemetery.

=== Descendants ===
Through his surviving daughter Louise, he was the grandfather of William Corcoran Eustis (1862–1921) and Louise Marie Eustis Hitchcock (1867–1934), who married Thomas Hitchcock (1860–1941), in 1891.

Corcoran's niece, Mrs. S. Charles Hill, founded the Washington Home for Incurables.

=== Legacy ===
The bank Corcoran co-founded in 1840 existed as Riggs Bank up until 2005, when it was taken over by PNC Bank. The Corcoran Gallery of Art in Washington D.C. was one of the oldest American private museums focusing on American art until it was dissolved in 2014 with its art collections given to the National Gallery of Art and the building (including art school) transferred to George Washington University in Washington, DC. Corcoran has a street named after him in the Dupont Circle neighborhood in the District of Columbia between Q street and R street NW, one block away from Riggs Street. Furthermore, he has a street in northeast Washington, DC in the Ivy City neighborhood. As well, the Corcoran neighborhood in Minneapolis, Minnesota which is bounded by East Lake Street to the north, East 36th Street to the south, Hiawatha Avenue to the east, and Cedar Avenue to the west, is named for William Corcoran. Mount Corcoran in the Sierra Nevada mountain range of California is named in his honor.

== Bibliography ==
- District of Columbia (2005). District of Columbia Register. Vol. 52 (Public domain ed.). District of Columbia, Office of Documents.
