= Riggs Bank =

Bank in Washington, D.C. (1836–2005)

Riggs National Corporation
- Industry: Banking
- Founded: 1836; 190 years ago
- Founder: William Wilson Corcoran
- Defunct: May 13, 2005; 21 years ago
- Fate: Acquired by PNC Financial Services
- Headquarters: Washington, D.C., U.S.
- Key people: Anthony P. Terracciano, Chairman; Steven T. Tamburo, CFO
- Total assets: $6.008 billion (2004)
- Total equity: $0.317 billion (2004)
- Number of employees: 1,307 (2004)

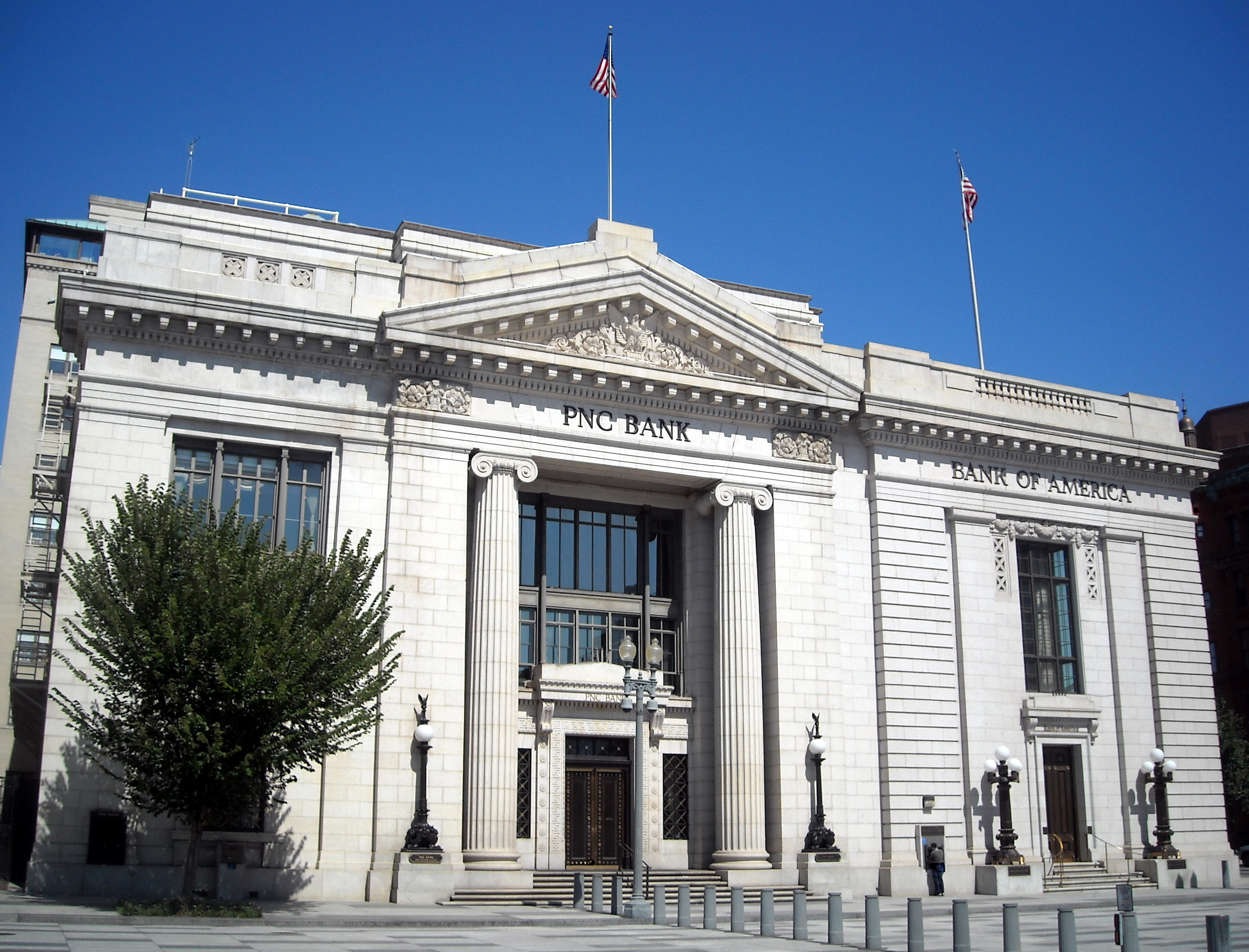
Former Riggs National Bank headquarters, on Pennsylvania Avenue in Washington, D.C. The rightmost section is the American Security and Trust Company Building.

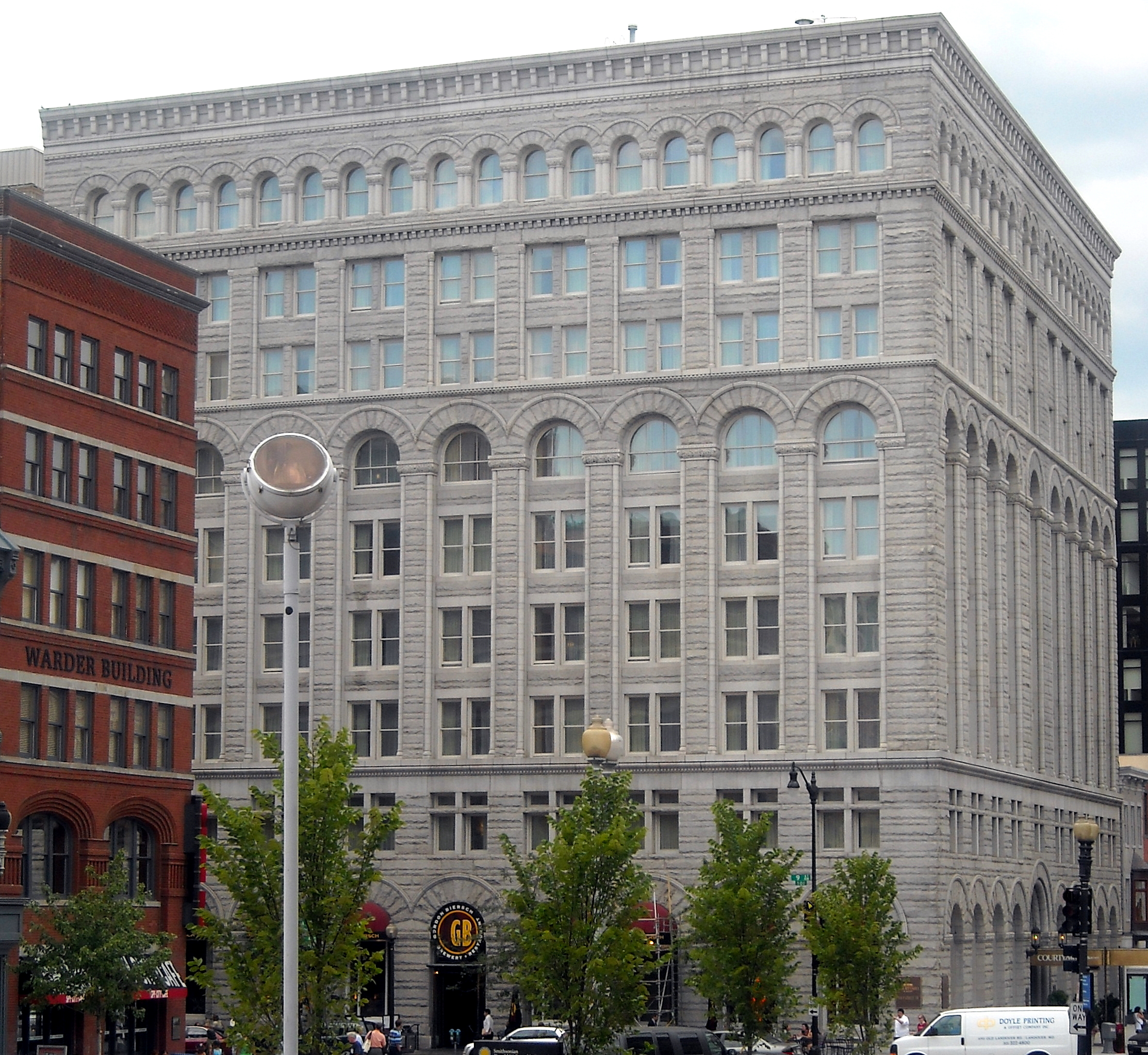
Former Riggs Bank building, now the Riggs Washington DC Hotel.

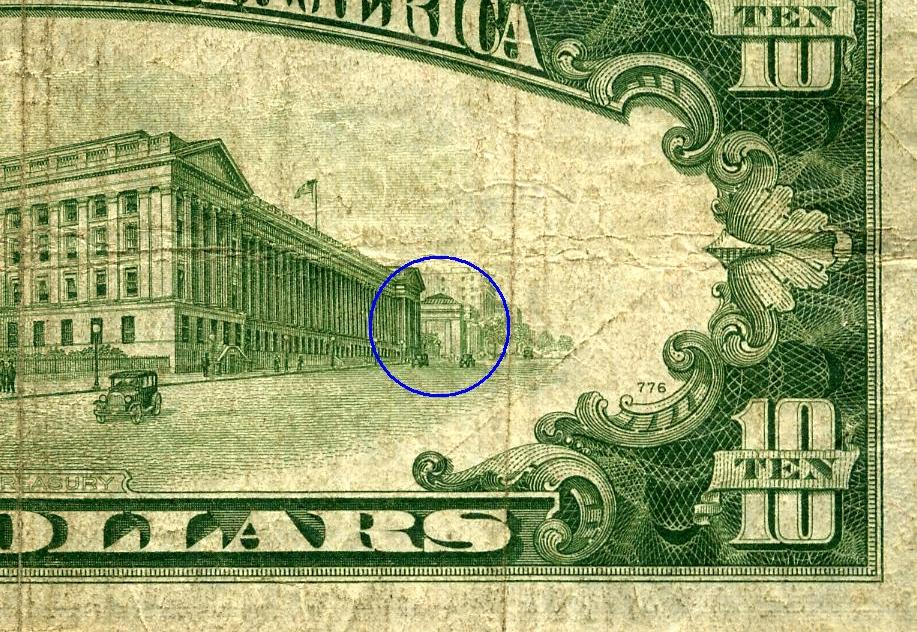
The American Security and Trust Company Building, which housed Riggs Bank's headquarters, appeared on the back of the $10 bill, in the background of the Treasury Building.

Riggs Bank was a bank headquartered in Washington, D.C. For most of its history, it was the largest bank headquartered in that city. On May 13, 2005, after the exposure of several money laundering scandals, the bank was acquired by PNC Financial Services.

The bank was known for handling the personal financial affairs of many U.S. Presidents and many embassies in Washington, D.C. Twenty-three U.S. Presidents or their families banked at Riggs, including Martin Van Buren, John Tyler, Abraham Lincoln, Ulysses S. Grant, Dwight D. Eisenhower, and Richard Nixon. Accounts were also held by Senators Henry Clay, John C. Calhoun and Daniel Webster, Confederate president Jefferson Davis, American Red Cross founder Clara Barton, suffragist Susan B. Anthony, and generals William Tecumseh Sherman and Douglas MacArthur.

The bank billed itself as "the most important bank in the most important city in the world". Its DC headquarters were pictured on the back of an old ten dollar bill.

The bank was investigated for several money laundering scandals, including going to great lengths to allow former Chilean dictator Augusto Pinochet to hide his fortune after his accounts were subjected to asset freezing and for unknowingly allowing the hijackers involved in the September 11 attacks to transfer money due to lax controls at the bank.

== History ==
- In 1836, William Wilson Corcoran opened a small brokerage house. In 1840, Corcoran and George Washington Riggs, the son of Elisha Riggs, a neighbor, formed "Corcoran & Riggs", which offered checking and depositing services.
- In 1844, the U.S. government allowed Corcoran & Riggs to be the only federal depository in Washington, significantly increasing business.
- In 1845, Corcoran & Riggs financed Samuel Morse's invention of the telegraph and moved into a new headquarters at 1503–1505 Pennsylvania Avenue NW, directly across the street from the United States Department of the Treasury.
- In 1847, the bank lent $16 million to the U.S. government to pay for the Mexican–American War.
- In 1854, Corcoran retired, and George Washington Riggs re-assumed leadership. The bank changed its name to "Riggs & Company".
- In 1868, the bank redeemed $7.2 million in gold for the treasury check which paid for the Alaska Purchase.
- In the 1860s, the bank financed Robert Peary's first expedition to the North Pole and the expansion of the United States Capitol.
- In 1881, George Washington Riggs died.
- In 1891, the new Riggs Bank building in Washington was opened, built in the Richardsonian Romanesque style.
- In 1896, after accepting a government charter, "Riggs National Bank" was formed, and Charles C. Glover was named president. In 1898, Lawrason Riggs resigned from the board of directors, ending the involvement of the Riggs family in the bank.
- In 1909, the president of the bank presented to the United States Congress an economic plan that resulted in the establishment of the Federal Reserve in 1913.
- During World War I, the bank participated in a Liberty bond drive. In the 1920s, the bank established a new savings deposit system due to the large deposit boom. During the Great Depression, Riggs director Robert V. Fleming acted as adviser to President Franklin D. Roosevelt.
- In 1922, the bank acquired Hamilton Savings Bank; it opened a branch in Dupont Circle. The bank also constructed the Riggs-Tompkins Building, which was at the time the largest building in Columbia Heights.
- In 1925, it acquired Northwest National Bank, and in 1928, it acquired Farmers and Mechanics National Bank, which included William Marbury on its board of directors. In 1933, Riggs acquired a portion of the assets of Chevy Chase Savings Bank.
- Beginning in the early 20th century, the bank embarked on a successful project to attract embassies and diplomats as customers, and by 1950, most embassies in Washington were customers of the bank.
- In the 1950s, the bank opened an office at Walter Reed Hospital.
- In 1954, Riggs acquired Washington Loan and Trust; in 1958, it acquired Lincoln National Bank.
- In 1981, Joe Allbritton acquired a controlling interest in the bank and became chairman.
- In 1983, due to the change in control, several executives, including chairman Vincent C. Burke, resigned.
- In 1986, the bank expanded into Northern Virginia with the acquisition of Guaranty Bank and Trust Company for $37.8 million.
- In 1990, the bank acquired The Bank of Washington.
- In 1993, Joe Allbritton resigned as chief executive officer of the bank after it suffered during the savings and loan crisis.
- On May 13, 2005, after the exposure of several money laundering scandals, the bank was acquired by PNC Financial Services.

== Scandals ==
=== Saudi money transfers before the September 11 attacks ===
In 2000, Omar al-Bayoumi opened bank accounts for two of the hijackers involved with the September 11 attacks. Shortly thereafter, Al-Bayoumi's wife received payments totaling tens of thousands of dollars from Princess Haifa bint Faisal, the wife of Saudi Arabian ambassador Bandar bin Sultan through a Riggs bank account.

Upon discovery of these transactions, the Federal Bureau of Investigation (FBI) began investigating the bank for possible money laundering and terrorist financing. Although the FBI and later the 9/11 Commission ultimately stated that the money was not intentionally being routed to fund terrorists, investigators were surprised at the lax safeguards at the bank. Several Saudi accounts were discovered to have financial improprieties, including a lack of required background checks. Regulators were not alerted to large transactions that violated federal banking laws.

Many of these transactions involved Prince Bandar personally, often transferring over $1 million at a time. According to British investigations on the Al-Yamamah arms deal, Bandar received over $1.5 billion in bribery from BAE Systems, laundered through Riggs Bank.

=== Hiding the fortune of Augusto Pinochet ===
Augusto Pinochet, the former dictator of Chile, was widely accused of corruption, illegal arms sales, and torture. In 1994, Riggs officials invited Pinochet to open an account at the bank. In 1998, Pinochet was arrested in the United Kingdom for possible extradition to Spain, and his accounts were subjected to asset freezing by court orders. By using a shell company and hiding accounts from federal regulators, Riggs illegally allowed Pinochet to hide and retain access to much of his fortune.

Regulators were also found to be negligent in holding the bank accountable. The bank examiner from the Office of the Comptroller of the Currency tasked with investigating Riggs in 2002, R. Ashley Lee, was later given an executive position at Riggs. In 2004, Lee was placed on paid leave by the bank pending a United States Department of Justice investigation on whether he violated government ethics rules.

The disclosure of the Riggs accounts reignited the case against General Pinochet. A ruling that he was mentally incompetent to stand trial was overturned when it was proven that the general had personally orchestrated some of the enormous transactions. In 2004, Pinochet was ordered to stand trial for crimes against humanity, and additional claims of mental and physical incompetence were overruled. However, Pinochet died in December 2006 before being judged. In September 2007, Pinochet's widow and five children were indicted by a Chilean court on charges including embezzlement.

In January 2005, the bank pleaded guilty and agreed to pay $16 million in fines for helping Pinochet. The bank and the Albritton family, which controlled the bank, agreed to pay $9 million to victims of the regime of Pinochet. The bank also paid $8 million to settle the legal case in Spain.

=== Embezzlement of oil revenues from Equatorial Guinea ===
In July 2004, the United States Senate published a report that showed that at least $35 million was siphoned off by Teodoro Obiang Nguema Mbasogo, the long-time dictator of Equatorial Guinea, from the account held by the Embassy of Equatorial Guinea in Washington, D.C., at Riggs.

Simon P. Kareri, the Riggs employee in charge of the Equatorial Guinea and other accounts, was accused of money-laundering in separate charges. As the account manager, he allegedly established a fake holding company in his wife's name and diverted funds into this account. In a hearing by the United States Senate Homeland Security Permanent Subcommittee on Investigations, Kareri, under advisement from legal counsel, refused to answer any questions of the panel by invoking his rights under the Fifth Amendment to the United States Constitution.

In May 2004, the bank was fined $25 million by the Office of the Comptroller of the Currency and the Financial Crimes Enforcement Network for violations of money-laundering laws.

A long-running Justice Department investigation was wrapped up quickly in February 2005 with Riggs pleading guilty and paying a $16 million fine for violations of the U.S. Bank Secrecy Act after a Wall Street Journal article reported December 31, 2004, that Riggs had extensive ties to the CIA, including that several bank officials held security clearances. Also, in February 2005, the bank and the Albritton family agreed to pay $9 million to Pinochet's victims for concealing and illegally facilitating the movement of Pinochet's money out of Britain. No similar payment has been made concerning Equatorial Guinea, as reported in this weekly Anti-Money Laundering Report from the Fair Finance Watch. The abuses at Riggs led Congress to consider forming a single agency with greater authority to enforce money laundering and currency control laws. Daniel E. Stipano, deputy chief counsel for the Office of the Comptroller of the Currency, said, "What happened with Riggs is unacceptable. It cannot be repeated." Riggs admitted criminal liability for failing to prevent money laundering.

=== Acquisition by PNC ===
In the wake of the money laundering scandals, members of the Albritton family resigned from the bank board. On February 10, 2005, PNC Financial Services agreed to acquire Riggs, and the merger was completed on May 13, 2005. The Riggs name was retired and all Riggs branches became PNC Bank branches three days later. Soon after the merger's completion, PNC phased out the scandal-plagued embassy business.
