= Henry Howard (diplomat) =

British diplomat

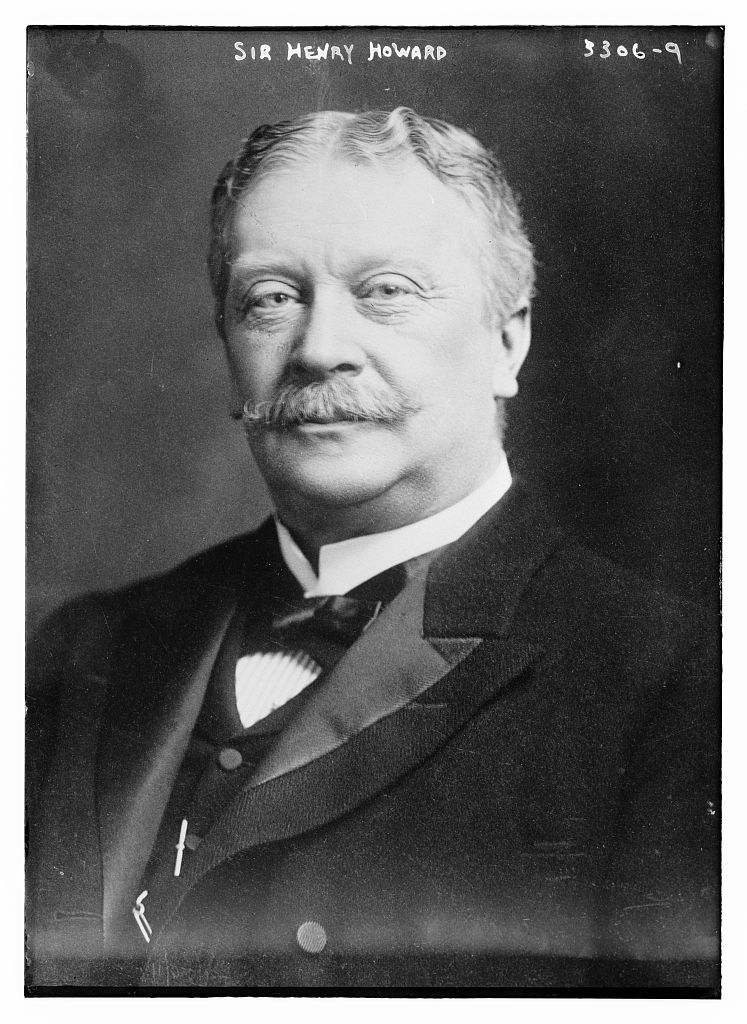
Sir Henry Howard, c. 1914

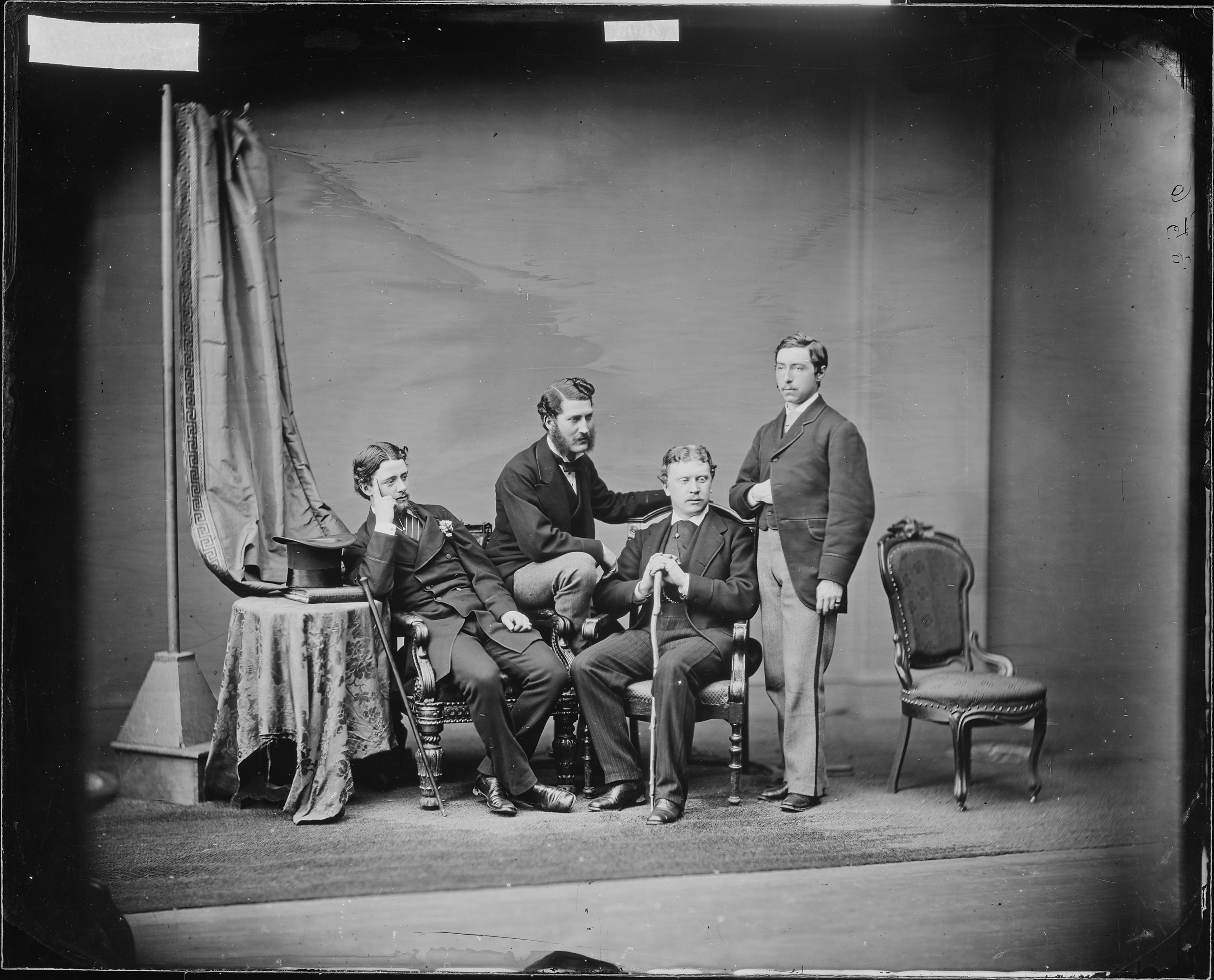
Howard, seated right, with other British attaché in Washington, D.C., c. 1865

Sir Henry Howard GCMG KCB (11 August 1843 – 4 May 1921) was a British diplomat who was the first formal British envoy to the Vatican in more than 300 years.

== Biography ==
Henry Howard was the elder son of Sir Henry Francis Howard, also a British diplomat and ambassador, through whom he was a descendant of Lord William Howard, younger son of Thomas Howard, 4th Duke of Norfolk. He was a member of the Howard family, a Roman Catholic, and was educated at Downside School. As a direct descendant of the 4th Duke of Norfolk and a relative of both 15th Duke and 16th Duke, Sir Henry Howard he had potential rights to inherit the Dukedom of Norfolk, in the event that the main branches of the family became extinct.

He joined the Diplomatic Service as an attaché to the Legation in Washington, D.C. in 1865. He was promoted to Third Secretary in 1869 and to Second Secretary in 1873. While in Washington he was Her Majesty's Agent for British claims under the Treaty of Washington (1871). For this service, he was invested as a Companion of the Order of the Bath (CB) in 1874, after he had left Washington. He then served in The Hague, and, in early 1876, was in London as secretary to a Royal Commission on Fugitive Slaves. After this he was posted back to Washington, then to Guatemala in 1883.

In 1885, Howard was promoted again to be Secretary to the legation at Athens, and subsequently held the same post at the legations at Copenhagen, Peking and St Petersburg. In 1894, he was appointed Secretary to the embassy at Paris. In 1896, he was appointed minister to the Netherlands and also to Luxembourg. While at The Hague, Howard was knighted KCMG, in January 1899, and, a few months later, he was named as British co-representative (with Sir Julian Pauncefote) at the Hague Convention of 1899. Sir Henry was promoted to Knight Commander of the Order of the Bath (KCB) in the King's Birthday Honours of 1907. In October 1908 he left The Hague after presenting his letters of recall to Queen Wilhelmina, who conferred on him the Order of Orange-Nassau. Some of his furniture and effects were shipped on the Great Eastern Railway Company's ship Yarmouth which sank with all hands on its way from Hook of Holland to Harwich on 27 October 1908.

In December 1914, after the outbreak of the First World War, Sir Henry was appointed "His Majesty's Envoy Extraordinary and Minister Plenipotentiary on a Special Mission to His Holiness the Pope" (Benedict XV, who had been elected that September). Sir Henry was accompanied by a member of Foreign Office staff to be Secretary of the mission. This appointment established full diplomatic relations with the Holy See for the first time since 1558 (although the United Kingdom had been intermittently represented at the Vatican during the 19th century by diplomats accredited to Italian states). Sir Henry's instructions, in a letter to him from the Foreign Secretary, Sir Edward Grey, were published in a parliamentary paper (Cd.7736):

You will ... in presenting your letters of credence to his Holiness, and offering him the cordial congratulations of his Majesty the King on the occasion of his election, intimate to him that his Majesty's Government are anxious to put themselves into direct communication with him for the purpose of demonstrating the motives which have governed their attitude since the first moment that the normal relations between the Great Powers of Europe began to be disturbed and of establishing that his Majesty's Government used every effort to maintain the peace of Europe which his Holiness' venerated predecessor had so much at heart.

In August 1916 Sir Henry retired from the Diplomatic Service and was appointed GCMG "in recognition of his long and eminent services, and on the occasion of his retirement." He died in Rome on 4 May 1921.

Diplomatic posts
Preceded by Sir Horace Rumbold, 8th Baronet	Envoy Extraordinary and Minister Plenipotentiary to the Court of The Hague and Envoy Extraordinary and Minister Plenipotentiary to His Royal Highness the Grand Duke of Luxemburg; 1896–1908	Succeeded by George Buchanan
Preceded by no representation	Envoy Extraordinary and Minister Plenipotentiary on a Special Mission to His Holiness the Pope; 1914–16	Succeeded by John Francis Charles, 7th Count de Salis-Soglio

== Family ==
On 2 October 1867 Henry Howard married Cecilia Riggs, daughter of George Washington Riggs. They had three daughters and two sons. Lady Howard (as she became) died on 3 December 1907.
