= T. Lawrason Riggs =

American Catholic priest and lyricist (1888–1943)

Thomas Lawrason Riggs (1888–1943) was an American Catholic priest and musical theatre lyricist. Riggs was the first Catholic chaplain of Yale University.

== Early life ==
The grandson of banker George Washington Riggs, Riggs was from a wealthy upper class Episcopalian family. In his youth Riggs was an acquaintance of the artist L. Bancel LaFarge, and came to know Thornton Wilder, Monty Woolley and other notable creative people while at Yale. Riggs was the president of the Yale Dramatic Society and a member of the Scroll and Key collegiate society. Riggs was a member of the Yale University Pundits, a senior society and literary group. He had a great love for the keeping of diaries and was the secretary of his class year.

Graduating from Yale as a member of the class of 1910, Riggs embarked on graduate studies at Harvard University as an assistant to Barrett Wendell, which were interrupted by his foray into musical theatre. Riggs never completed his doctorate.

Riggs was Cole Porter's roommate at Yale, and with Porter wrote See America First, a patriotic comic opera that spoofed the "flag waving" musicals of George M. Cohan. See America First received a poor critical reception when it opened on Broadway in March 1916 following previews in New Haven, Connecticut and Rochester, New York. Riggs had invested $35,000 in the production and never worked on another musical.

Riggs joined the Yale Mobile Hospital unit at the United States entry into World War I in 1917, and later served as a specialist in foreign languages to military intelligence in Paris.

== Catholic chaplaincy ==
Following the war Riggs decided to become a Catholic priest, a vocation he had been considering since 1910. He graduated from The Catholic University of America and the St. Thomas Seminary in Connecticut., following which he was appointed the first Catholic Chaplain at Yale. The Catholic Bishop of Hartford, John Joseph Nilan, forbade Riggs to celebrate Sunday Mass on campus, in deference to local priests, who opposed the creation of a religious centre outside parish structures. Following Nilan's death in 1934, the ban was lifted in 1936 by his successor as bishop, Maurice F. McAuliffe.

Yale had only 300 Catholic students out of a student body of more than 3000 in 1922, and no Catholic teachers until 1915. Students would meet at Riggs' home; his lectures were initially unpopular, perhaps due to his deliberate style of speaking and a refusal to pander to public tastes. Following his death $200,000 was raised to build the Saint Thomas More House and Chapel. The T. Lawrason Riggs Chair of Catholic Studies was established in 1962 at Yale. The first occupant of the chair was Stephan Kuttner, and it is now known as the T. Lawrason Riggs Professor of History and Religious Studies.

An independent member of the Yale community, Riggs resisted an attempt to reinstitute compulsory chapel attendance, and criticised the editor of the Yale Daily News for slanted coverage of religious topics. Riggs also wrote and published a seven-page pamphlet attempting to correct what he saw as an inaccurate and misleading description of the Origins of Christianity given by Professor Edwin Goodenaugh in his Western Civilisation course for Yale freshmen.

Outside Yale Riggs was a patron and contributor to Commonweal magazine from 1922 until his death and a participant of the National Conference of Christians and Jews in the 1930s. Riggs joined a rabbi and a Protestant minister on a speaking tour of the Southern United States in 1935 and the Western States in 1937. Riggs died of a heart attack in 1943.

== Legacy ==
The T. Lawrason Riggs Professorship of History and Religious Studies, funded by anonymous Yale alumni, honors Riggs. The current holder is Carlos Eire.
