= George Washington Riggs =

American banker (1813–1881)

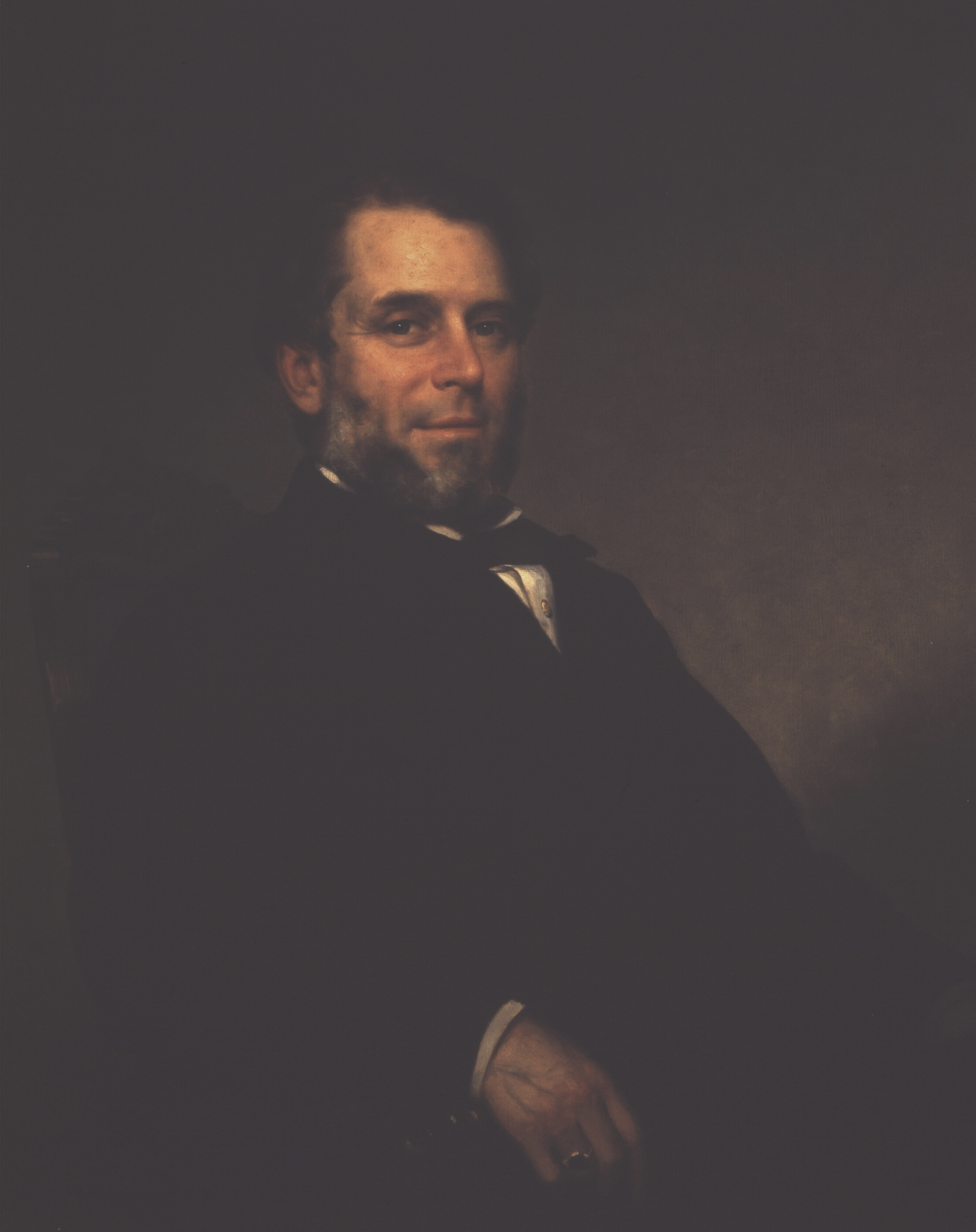
- Portrait by Charles Loring Elliott, c. 1867
- Born: July 4, 1813; Georgetown D.C., U.S.
- Died: August 24, 1881 (aged 68); Prince George's County, Maryland, U.S.
- Resting place: Rock Creek Cemetery; Washington, D.C., U.S.
- Education: Round Hill School
- Alma mater: Yale College
- Spouse: Janet Madeleine Cecilia Shedden (after 1840)
- Children: 9, including T. Lawrason Riggs
- Parent(s): Elisha Riggs; Alice Lawrason

George Washington Riggs (July 4, 1813 – August 24, 1881) was an American businessman and banker. He was known as "The President's Banker." He was a trustee of the Corcoran Gallery of Art and the Peabody Education Fund.

== Early life ==
Riggs was born in Georgetown, D.C., which is now part of Washington, D.C., the son of Elisha Riggs and his first wife, Alice (née Lawrason) Riggs. After his mother's death in 1817, his father remarried to Mary Ann Karrick with whom he had several more children, in 1822.

His grandfather was silversmith Lt. Samuel Riggs, and his great-grandfather was John Riggs, who was mentioned in a will in Anne Arundel County, Maryland, as early as 1716. George was brought up in Baltimore, to which his father removed after he took George Peabody into partnership and established the firm of Riggs & Peabody there. He went to the Round Hill School kept by George Bancroft and Joseph Green Cogswell at Northampton, Massachusetts, and entered Yale College in 1829, but left some time in his junior year. He traveled abroad, and, returning to America, worked for his father in the mercantile firm of Riggs, Taylor & Company in New York City.

== Career ==
In 1840, William W. Corcoran took him into partnership in the banking firm of Corcoran & Riggs at Washington, D.C. The firm was immediately successful; it was able to obtain a major share of the loans required by the federal government, acquired a reputation in financing the Mexican–American War, and made large profits. In 1848 he gave up his connection with the firm, to which, however, his younger half-brother Elisha succeeded so that the firm name remained the same. When Corcoran retired in 1854, Riggs bought his interest. Under the firm name of Riggs & Company (since 1896 Riggs Bank), he directed the business until his death.

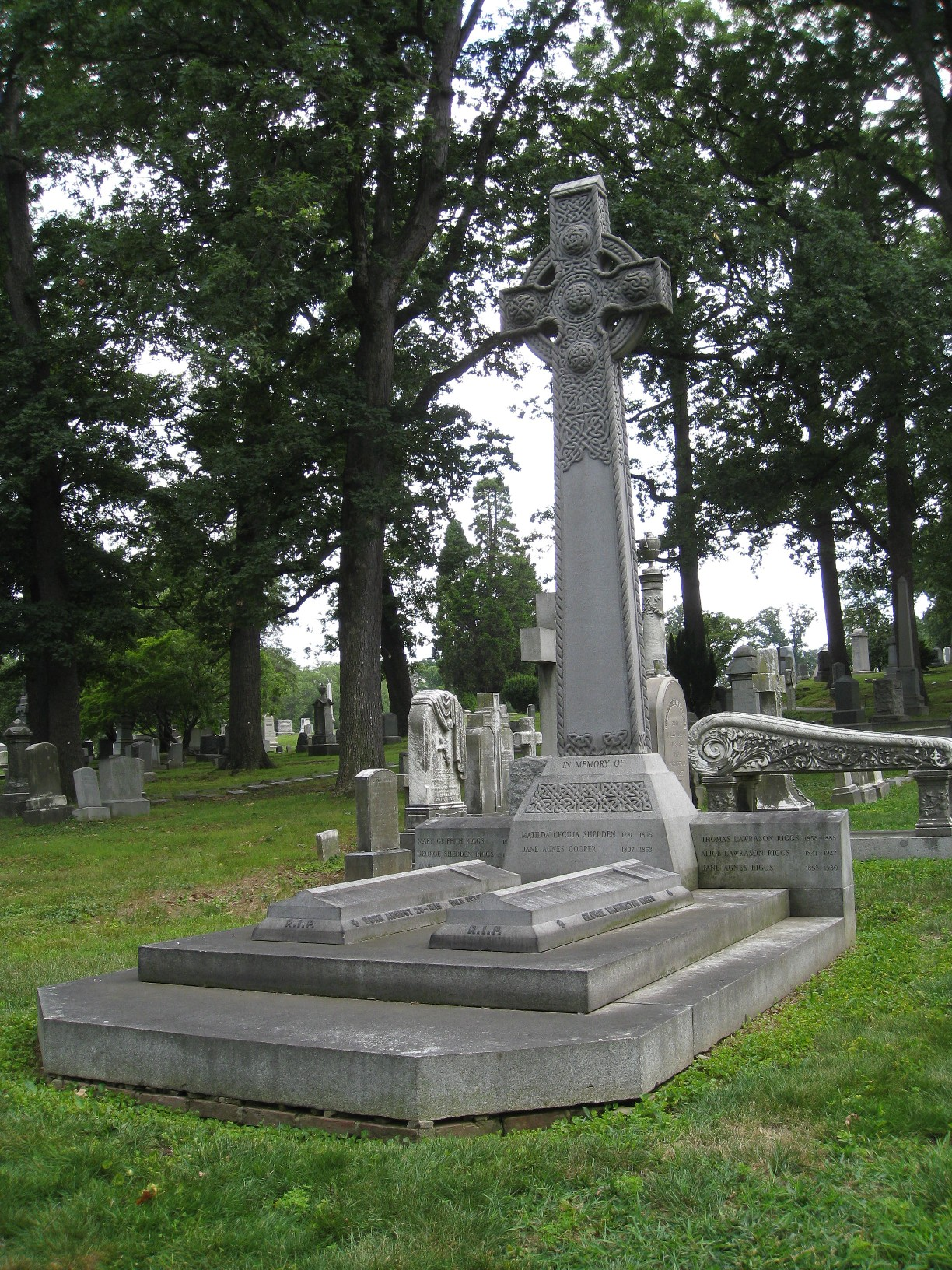
Gravesite of George Washington Riggs

From 1855 to 1862 he served on the Levy Court of Washington County. The Levy Court acted as County Commission for what was by then all of Washington, DC.

He was a member of the board of aldermen of the District of Columbia, in 1873 was chairman of a committee to present to Congress a petition asking for an investigation into the conduct of the board of public works, helped to obtain a committee report favorable to the abolition of the existing territorial form of government, and was active in the establishment of the present (1934) form of government that vests all authority in Congress. He built and owned the Riggs House, a famous hotel of his time, and was one of the organizers of the Washington and Georgetown Railroad Company. He was a trustee of the Corcoran Gallery of Art and of the Peabody Education Fund. He was for many years the treasurer of the Mount Vernon Ladies' Association of the Union. In 1864 he advanced the money to maintain Mount Vernon until the return of peace should make it possible for the society again to raise funds.

== Personal life ==
On June 23, 1840, he was married to Janet Madeleine Cecilia Shedden, the daughter of Thomas Shedden of Glasgow, Scotland. They had nine children, including:

- Alice Lawrason Riggs (1841–1927), who died unmarried.
- Catherine Shedden Riggs (1842–1881), who married Louis de Geofroy, French Ambassador to China and French Minister to Japan.
- Cecilia Dowdall Riggs (1844–1907), who married the British diplomat Sir Henry Howard in 1867.
- Janet Madeleine Riggs (1845–1861), who died young.
- Mary Griffith Riggs (1847–1849), who died young.
- George Shedden Riggs (1849–1856), who died young.
- Elisha Francis Riggs (1851–1910), who married Medora Thayer, a daughter of James Smith Thayer, in 1879.
- Jane Agnes Riggs (1853–1930), who died unmarried.
- Thomas Lawrason Riggs (1858–1888).

== Death ==
Riggs died at his home, Green Hill, in Prince George's County, Maryland. The Green Hill estate included suburbs northeast of Washington, D.C., including Adelphi, Chillum, and Lewisdale. Although an Episcopal Protestant in early life, he received the last rites of the Catholic Church. He is buried at Rock Creek Cemetery, near Riggs Road in Washington, D.C.

=== Relations and descendants ===
His grandniece, Kate Cheeseman Riggs, married Edward Newton Perkins, the grandson of U.S. Secretary of State, U.S. Attorney General and U.S. Senator William M. Evarts and the brother of famed editor Maxwell Perkins; uncles of Watergate Scandal special prosecutor Archibald Cox.

== In fiction ==
George Riggs is a character in the historical novel Forty-Ninth by Boris Pronsky and Craig Britton.
