= Inside Washington =

American political roundtable TV series

- Presented by: Gordon Peterson
- Theme music composer: Nikolai Rimsky-Korsakov
- Opening theme: Procession of the Nobles
- Country of origin: United States

Production
- Running time: 30 minutes
- Production companies: Post-Newsweek Television on WUSA (1988–1994); Gannett Co., Inc. on WUSA (1994–2004); Allbritton Communications Company on WJLA (2004–2013)

Original release
- Network: Broadcast syndication, primarily to public television
- Release: 1988 – 2013

Related
- Agronsky & Co.

Inside Washington, formerly Agronsky & Co., was a political roundtable show hosted by the WJLA news presenter and chief political reporter Gordon Peterson that aired from 1988 to 2013. It was produced by Allbritton, then-owner of WJLA, and distributed to public television stations nationwide by American Public Television. In each broadcast, Peterson had four panelists discussing their opinions on political topics that were in the news during the week, and occasionally brought in a fifth panelist or guest journalist via a satellite television feed.

== History ==
Inside Washington was the descendant of Agronsky & Co., a show hosted by Martin Agronsky and produced by Post-Newsweek, the owners of WUSA 9, from 1969 to 1988, and broadcast on WUSA in the Washington, D.C. area. On Agronsky's retirement in 1988, Peterson took over as host, and the show was renamed Inside Washington. The series was originally produced by Post-Newsweek Television like its predecessor. Gannett took over production for the remainder of the show's run on WUSA. When Peterson moved to WJLA in the autumn of 2004, the show and all of its regular panelists at the time were brought to WJLA as well. Allbritton Communications Company took over production for the show's run on WJLA (2004–2013) Its regular broadcast time was switched from Saturday evenings (as also had been the practice with Agronsky & Co.) to Sunday mornings, although the show maintained a Saturday evening presence after the switch to WJLA with broadcasts on NewsChannel 8, a Washington D.C. area local news cable television channel, briefly known as TBD TV, at the same time the show switched to WJLA. The show also began to be shown on the Washington, D.C.-area PBS station WETA on September 2, 2005.

When it debuted in 1969, Agronsky & Co. was a pioneer of the "talking head" format of television journalism in which journalists discussed the news of the day with one another in a roundtable format instead of interviewing the newsmakers themselves. The format was inexpensive to produce and appealed to a niche market of affluent viewers. Many shows have since adopted the format, and it has become a staple of television opinion programming.

In early September 2013, Gordon Peterson announced that Inside Washington would cease production in late December 2013, ending a continuous run of 25 years for Inside Washington and a combined 44 years for Agronsky & Co. and Inside Washington. The last new episode of Inside Washington aired on WETA on December 20, 2013, on Newschannel 8 on December 21, 2013, and on WJLA on December 22, 2013.

== Broadcast ==
In the Washington, D.C., area, Inside Washington was broadcast on WETA on Friday nights at 8:30 PM (this broadcast was simulcast on the WETA World PBS cable television channel), on TBD TV on Saturday nights at 7:00 PM, and on Sunday mornings at 9:00 AM on WJLA. Although the Saturday evening broadcast time was consistent, WETA and WJLA sometimes changed the broadcast times on Fridays and Sundays respectively for brief periods, and over the years the regular Sunday time slot for the show on WJLA also varied. Inside Washington was syndicated to PBS stations around the United States.

Agronsky & Co. always had a more staid tone than most of its later imitators. The tone of Inside Washington, although somewhat more opinionated than under Agronsky's stewardship, nonetheless was very different from that of many "talking head" shows that followed, including The McLaughlin Group, one of its major competitors. Where The McLaughlin Group panelists and host John McLaughlin himself are prone to loud voices and direct arguments, the Inside Washington panelists tended to remain at a normal speaking voice and were rarely combative. In addition, Peterson was much less likely to provide his personal opinion on the topic than McLaughlin.

The show's regular panelists in its later years were Colbert I. King, Charles Krauthammer, Mark Shields, Evan Thomas, and Nina Totenberg, four of whom appeared on each show. Although it was not common, the fifth would occasionally participate in person or in all or part of a show via a satellite television feed. When two or more of the regulars were unavailable during the same week, other journalists would participate to keep the number of panelists at four and to substitute for Peterson when he was unavailable.

The theme song for Inside Washington was "Procession of the Nobles" from the ballet Mlada by the Russian composer Nikolai Rimsky-Korsakov. This also was the theme song of Agronsky & Co.

== Regular panelists ==
- Hugh Sidey
- Nina Totenberg
- Mark Shields
- Evan Thomas
- Colbert King
- Charles Krauthammer

== See also ==
- Agronsky & Co.
- Washington Week
- Gordon Peterson
