= Sarah Lee (reporter) =

Korean American reporter for CNN (born 1971)

Sarah Choi Lee (born 1971) is a Korean American reporter for CNN. Prior to working at CNN, Lee was a reporter for WJLA-TV, an ABC affiliate in Washington, D.C. from 2003–2009. She appeared on NewsChannel 8, which is owned by the same company, Allbritton Communications.

Prior to her position at WJLA, she worked as a national correspondent for the Washington Bureau of NBC News and as a reporter for WRC-TV in Washington, D.C.

She was named one of Korea's Future Leaders by the JoongAng Ilbo, one of Korea's "big three newspapers".

== Biography ==
Sarah Lee is a native of Manhattan, New York. She attended Colby College where she received a Bachelor of Arts degree in Government and History. She has studied abroad in South Korea, France, and Ireland. Married to H.K. Park, a Vice President of The Cohen Group, a consulting firm headed by former Senator and Defense Secretary William Cohen. Their engagement in Bermuda was described in The Baltimore Sun and their wedding was profiled in The New York Times.

She was named one of Washingtonian's 25 Most Beautiful people in March 2006.

== Professional career ==
Sarah Lee began her career behind the scenes at Dateline NBC where she helped investigate stories undercover and on-camera. She has since reported on-air in Greenville, North Carolina and at WTVR-TV in Richmond, Virginia prior to her work in the Washington, D.C. area.

As a correspondent for the Washington bureau of NBC and MSNBC, she was the on-scene reporter for the 2002 Quecreek Mine Rescue, where nine coal miners were trapped and subsequently rescued from a Pennsylvania mine. She reported on the DC Sniper investigation and from The Pentagon on September 11th and in the ensuing days. She has also covered Hurricanes Bertha (1996), Fran (1996), Bonnie (1998), Dennis (1999), and Floyd (1999).

Her work has earned her an Emmy nomination, and three Virginia Associated Press Awards. She has served as the Broadcast Vice President for the DC Chapter of the Asian American Journalists Association and has been honored by the JoongAng Ilbo as one of Korea's Future Leaders. She was named a Knight Fellow in Specialized Journalism. Her focus was on the American military.

She was one of 26 WJLA employees laid off on January 23, 2009, as a result of what station officials characterized as "a financial necessity in light of economic straits".

She and her husband H.K. Park have two children who published a Guide to the Playgrounds of Arlington County, Virginia. In June 2016, their children published a second book called "How Your City Works: Behind the Scenes in Arlington, VA".
