= Marie Louise Kirkland =

Roman Catholic nun and TV commentator (1899–1999)

Sister Marie Louise Kirkland V. H. M.
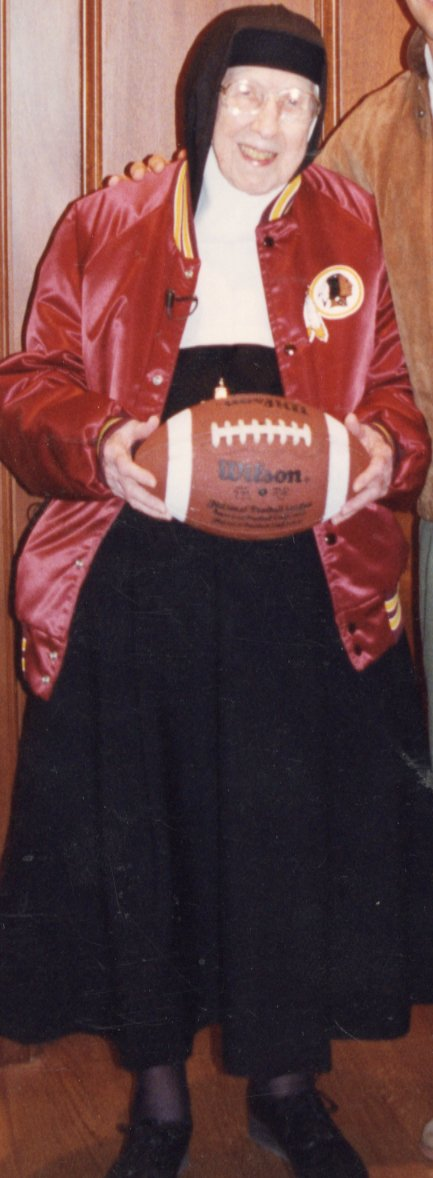
- Born: Helen Kirkland; October 1, 1899; Washington, District of Columbia, U.S.
- Died: July 10, 1999 (aged 99); Washington, D.C., U.S.
- Occupations: Roman Catholic nun, television personality

Sister Marie Louise (October 1899 – July 10, 1999) was a Roman Catholic nun and television sports commentator in Washington, D.C. Even though she was a nun who lived in a monastery and wore a traditional habit, "Weezie" regularly appeared on television station WUSA with sportscaster Glenn Brenner, who called her "The Pigskin Prognosticator".

== Early life and education ==
Born in Washington, D.C., to Rose Virginia Kreamer Kirkland (1858–1944) and William L. Kirkland (1848–1918), with siblings William Louis Kirkland (1892–1955) and Camille Rose Kirkland Fisher (1901–1982), she played basketball in high school in Montgomery County, Maryland. She graduated from Immaculata College and worked in the Rockville, Maryland, courthouse as a clerk until her 30s.

She entered Georgetown Visitation Monastery on January 5, 1935, at age 35, and remained there as a semi-cloistered nun for the rest of her life. Although she initially worried that she'd have to give up sports, her superiors did permit her to follow them avidly, especially her favorite, football. Wrote Claudia Levy in The Washington Post, "It helped that the mother superior of Georgetown Visitation, Mother Mary de Sales, happened to be a rabid football fan herself and loved staying up late with her to watch the matches."

== Career as a celebrity sports forecaster ==
D.C. sportscaster Glenn Brenner was a Roman Catholic who went to parochial school in Philadelphia, and graduated from Saint Joseph's University, a Jesuit institution in that city. In 1989 he heard from a Georgetown Visitation Preparatory School alumna that Sister Marie Louise had a talent for sports predictions, so he invited her to call into his "Mystery Prognosticator Contest". Each week, a different guest made picks for the week's NFL schedule, including Dan Rather, Maureen Bunyan, Sugar Ray Leonard, Pee-Wee Herman, Mark Rypien, and members of the Temptations. In Week 11, Sister Kirkland went 11–3, the best record of the season to date, and finished tied with Santa Claus for the best record of the entire season. Brenner made her a regular, with the permission of Mother DeSales, and the story was picked up internationally.

Washingtonian reporter Barbara Matusow wrote that when Glenn Brenner was dying prematurely at age 44 in the hospital, Sister Marie Louise was one of his last visitors along with fellow WUSA broadcaster Gordon Peterson. Peterson was also a devout Catholic, and had once considered becoming a Dominican priest. Sr. Kirkland's presence in the hospital surprised him, because he knew that cloister rules were so strict that even though she had long wanted to attend a Washington Redskins game at Brenner's invitation, she wasn't permitted to go. "How the hell did she get out?" Matusow reported that Peterson wondered when he saw her there in the hospital. "Did she scale the wall?'" When she went to the bedside, Brenner, who had been unconscious for days, opened his eyes in her presence and winked at her. Peterson told Matusow that he then became very emotional: "If it hadn't been for someone holding me up, I would have passed out. I think I'm getting more spiritual as I get older, but I honestly sensed the presence of God in the room at that moment."

Sister Kirkland was included in the comments of U.S. representative Constance Morella when the representative paid tribute to Glenn Brenner on the House floor: "Whether it was his 'Weenie of the Week' award, his constant pranks, or his guest football prognosticator interviews, Glenn kept it light. Who can forget his wonderful interviews with Sister Marie Louise, classics in the annals of Washington broadcasting."
