= Doug McKelway =

American television journalist

Douglas B. McKelway (born 1954) is a television journalist who served as a general assignment reporter for the Washington, D.C. bureau of the Fox News Channel from 2010 to 2020. He joined the network in November 2010. McKelway previously worked at the Washington, D.C. ABC affiliate WJLA-TV. He resigned from Fox in 2020.

He was born and raised in Washington, D.C. His grandfather, Benjamin M. McKelway, was editor of the Washington Evening Star newspaper and President of the Associated Press. His father, William Prentiss McKelway, was an obstetrician and a clinical professor at George Washington University Hospital. McKelway graduated from the Landon School in Bethesda, Maryland. He earned his Bachelor of Arts degree from Skidmore College.

== Broadcast career ==
McKelway's first television news job was in Charlotte, North Carolina at WPCQ-TV (now WCNC-TV) from 1980 to 1982. He also worked in Kansas, Missouri and Florida, before returning to Washington. He was a reporter and news anchor with WRC-TV until October 2001, when he joined WJLA-TV.

On May 13, 2009, as co-host of Washington, D.C.'s Let's Talk Live on local cable's TBD TV (Formerly News Channel 8), McKelway conducted a live interview with blogger Michael Rogers where they discussed Rogers' efforts to "out" secretly gay politicians who oppose gay rights. At one point, McKelway told Rogers, "I'd take you outside and give you a punch across the face... I think you're hurting innocent people."

In July 2010, McKelway provided live coverage for the noon newscast of a rally by religious and environmental groups that were protesting BP's response to the Gulf oil spill. McKelway made comments regarding BP's contributions to Democratic President Barack Obama. After the broadcast, McKelway met with WJLA Station Manager Bill Lord, who objected to the BP contribution facts being divulged in the live report, and following a heated exchange, McKelway was suspended from his reporting duties as well as anchoring the early-morning Good Morning Washington news show. The Washington Post later reported on September 17, 2010, that McKelway had been dismissed. After he was fired from WJLA, he was hired by Fox News. After controversy, fact-checking issues and unusual remarks, he resigned from Fox News in 2020.

== Personal life ==
McKelway plays the banjo and occasionally performs Bluegrass music at local taverns. He is married to Susan Ferrechio, chief congressional correspondent for Washington Examiner. They have four children: Doug, Eliza, Chris, and Alexander.
