= Gay Women's Alternative =

The Gay Women's Alternative, DC (GWA) (1981–1993) was an incorporated social-educational non-profit organization dedicated to enriching the cultural, intellectual, and social lives of lesbians of the Washington, D.C., area. The GWA was formed in 1980 to provide the DC lesbian community with an alternative and safe space to socialize and discuss feminist and educational topics concerning the lesbian and gay women population. The group met every Wednesday evening from 8 pm to 11 pm at the Washington Ethical Society near Silver Spring, Maryland. Weekly programs covered topics such as, "Organizing Your Finances for Success," "Lesbian Couples: How Different are we?" and "Women and Wellness: A Feminist Approach to Health Care". Speakers included black poet Audre Lorde, artist Joan E. Biren, television journalist Maureen Bunyan, and comedian Kate Karsten. The GWA held several dances, including the annual lesbian spring dance and the Spring Cotillion.

== History ==
The GWA came about as a result of a series of gay political activist efforts set by the Mattachine Society of Washington (MSW), 1961. On April 17, 1965, ten members of the MSW, three women and seven men, picketed the White House to change the government's discriminatory politices against LGBT people and the police department's treatment of LGBT individuals. This public event visibly broke the barriers of "closeted existence for gay people" in DC and create hope for a non-discriminatory future. As a result of the MSW efforts for change, gay women in DC wanted a place to get together and discuss gay rights. Lilli Vincenz, a member of MSW and an activist for gay and lesbian rights in Washington, D.C., invited women to meet every week at her home to create a safe venue for gay women to discuss gay activism and other lesbian related issues. Lilli Vincenz notes:

I decided to have women come into our home every week for seven years, and it just become an establishment. And it was wonderful to have them come, and we had musicians come ... lots of women who didn't know where to go, they didn't want to go to the bars, they just wanted to be in a place that was safe, so we provided that.

Vincenz's home became known as the Gay Women's Open House (GWOH), 1971–1979. However, due to the lack of space, it was decided that a bigger venue was needed. This is when Leigh Geiger, and Ina Alterman, from New York, formed the Gay Women's Alternative in 1980, providing the DC lesbian community with educational and social events that served as alternative social venues to the bar. The GWA's annual Spring Cotillion dance became the highlight of the year for lesbians in DC.

Gay social life DC up until the 1980s had been historically limited to bars, but the GWA, which advertised its organization as an "alternative to the closet and alternative to the bar", became known as an alternative space for gay women to gather and meet without the aid of alcohol or smoking. On July 28, 1982, the GWA board members decided that they needed to make the public more aware that their organization was for professional women. At the end of 1982, GWA began adding the slogan, GWA "For the Thinking Women" to the event flyers that were mailed out to the community every month. The meeting minutes read:

How do we define ourselves? What audience do we appeal to? The Pride Day advertisement described GWA as an "organization for professional women and suburban women." We have not been attracting black or other minorities. We many not be getting large crowds because professional women are closeted and busier.

The GWA tried to appeal to broad spectrum of women coming from various ethnic and religious backgrounds, however, the GWA consistently attracted white, suburban, professional women in their 30s and 40s. Esther Katzman, the president of the GWA in 1984, notes:

Perhaps the reason for this is reflected in how GWA is run. The Organization has no formal membership ... the group is run by a board of directors, currently comprised of seven women ... a relatively high powered group, more than half hold graduate degrees, two are lawyers, one is a therapist.

In 1993, the GWA was forced to shut down due to the lack of funding and the emergence of several other LGBT non-profits that provided more resources for the lesbian community.

== Organizational structure: Incorporation ==
On July 21, 1981, the GWA board members incorporated GWA, making it GWA, DC, Inc., an organization organized exclusively for educational purposes. The incorporation ensured that the organization would thrive as members left and new leaders emerged. As an Incorporation, GWA operations were overseen by the monthly meeting of twelve board of directors. Each director served a two-year term, and new directors were elected by interview in June of each year, with six members rotating each year. The bylaws prohibit reelection in order to ensure that new ideas, from different women, are incorporated into the expertise of the GWA. The day-to-day activities of the GWA were run by officers organized into six subcommittees: (i) programming, (ii) administration, (iii) logistics, (iv) publicity/community, (v) outreach, and (iv) volunteer coordination. Other women apart from the community helped support GWA, DC, Inc. by volunteering their time on various GWA events, such as Gay Pride and annual dance planning. The officers, directors, and volunteers did not receive compensation for their services at the GWA.

== GWA Annual Conference ==
On April 27, 1985, the GWA hosted its first annual conference, "Putting The Pieces Together: The positive Integration of Women's Professional, Social, and Personal Roles," at the Dupont Plaza Hotel. The goal of the conference was to provide the lesbian community with information and strategies that will allows them to become more effective in maintaining multiple rules and enhance social and professional lives. The program included a variety of talks, such as a keynote presentation by Maureen Bunyan, "Coming Out- A lifelong Process," by Esther Katzman, "Coping with stress, Tension, and Burnout," by Jeannette Paroly, "Starting Your Own Business – Women as Entrepreneurs," and more.

== Advertising ==
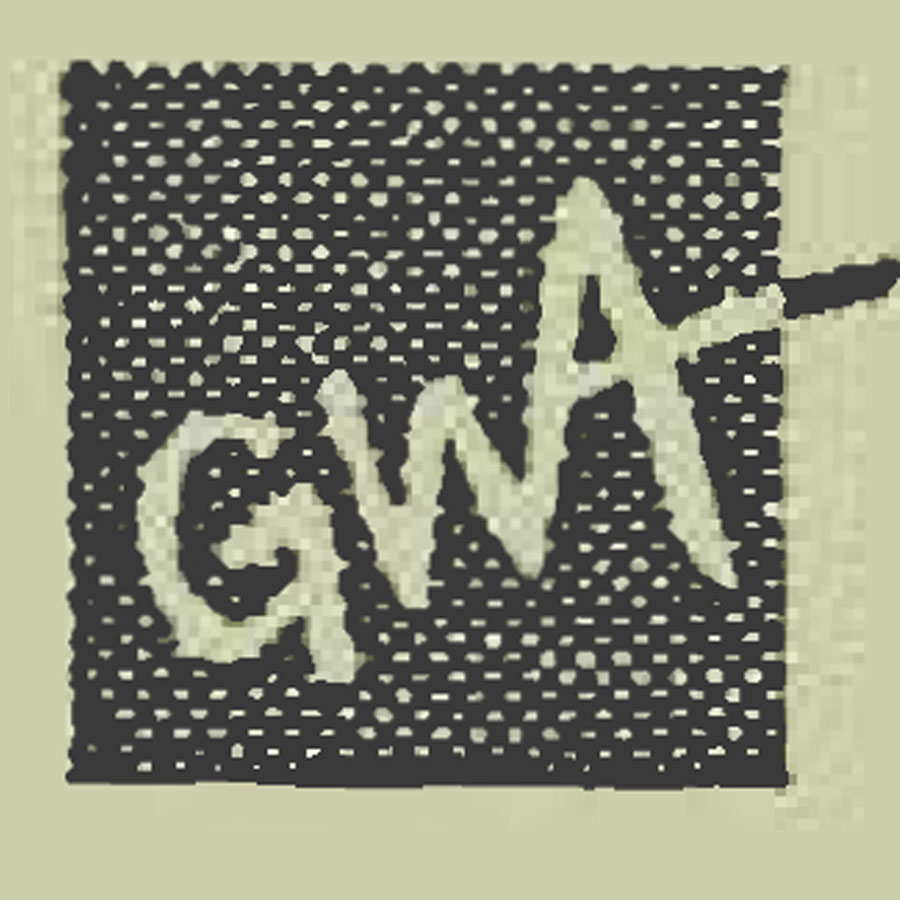
GWA's logo

The GWA placed most of their advertisements in local gay media, Washington Blade, The Crescent (a Women's Community Bulletin), Sapphire Sapphos newsletter, Diplomat Magazine, and in a monthly newsletter sent out to the GWA's mailing list Despite the major role GWA played within the lesbian community in DC, Washington Blade did not cover the GWA events as well as the women would have hoped. In the letter to the editor section of the Washington Blade, a concerned reader wrote:

The Washington Blade has consistently been lacking in its coverage of GWA events. GWA is one of the most important social and educational networks in the Lesbian community. Your May 3, 1985 review on the GWA First Annual Conference featuring Maureen Bunyan as keynote speaker was "Sparse" to say the least ... the Blade could better show its support of the Lesbian community with more complete and consistent coverage of the GWA organization and other lesbian interests.

Based on "Minutes of the Board Meeting" notes, in 1987, however, it is noted that the publicity and coverage of GWA events in Washington Blade increased significantly.

Most of the outreach occurred at the meetings and gay pride. Other sources of outreach was spent targeting new members within Gay and Lesbian groups at universities, North east Gay/Lesbian Student Association conference, and at local gay-owned shops such as the Lambda Rising bookstore. A panel was held at the University of Maryland Gay and Lesbian Student Union in March 1988, featuring a member from the GWA.

== Past GWA event programs ==
Below are a few of the GWA programs that were distributed by mail to the DC lesbian community.

- Gay Women's Alternative, DC 1981 Schedule of Events
- Gay Women's Alternative, DC 1985 Schedule of Events
- Gay Women's Alternative, DC 1986 Schedule of Events
- Gay Women's Alternative, DC 1987 Schedule of Events
- Gay Women's Alternative, DC 1993 Schedule of Events

== External links and resources ==
- The Rainbow History Project
- LGBT History Month 2011 - Lilli Vincenz
- Lilli Vincenz, gay rights trailblazer (LGBT History Month)
- Lilli Vincenz: A Lesbian Pioneer
- "GWA's 10th Birthday," (11 Jan. 1991) The Washington Blade, p. 32
