= TBD.com =

Defunct news website

- Available in: English
- Owner: Allbritton Communications
- Editor: Erik Wemple
- Website: www.tbd.com
- Launched: August 9, 2010; 16 years ago
- Current status: Defunct

TBD.com was a hyperlocal news site focused on the Washington, D.C. area. Launching on August 9, 2010, it was owned by the Arlington-based Allbritton Communications as a locally focused companion to its other media properties in Washington, including Politico and WJLA-TV. The site combined original reporting with that of independent blogs and contributions from WJLA's reporters and staff. Despite having growing readership, TBD suffered from poor profitability, which led to a series of staff cuts and a shift in focus after only 6 months in operation. TBD.com was shut down entirely in August 2012.

== History ==
I think we're trying to figure out how to have a mix of stuff produced by professionals and make sure you're keeping an eye on all the great stuff that's being produced by citizens in the area. And you put all those together to create a news report that is different from what you're seeing so far.

— Jim Brady, editor

Plans for the site were first announced in October 2009. The site was intended to serve as the broadcaster's main news site for Washington D.C. area news, replacing the existing websites for WJLA-TV and its sister cable channel NewsChannel 8. The official name of the new site, TBD.com, was unveiled on April 22, 2010. Site editor Erik Wemple had already used the name TBD in staff e-mails prior to the announcement, in this case alluding to the phrase "To be determined", but felt that the name would also fit the site's goal.

TBD.com would use a non-traditional approach to local news inspired by its sister website Politico; Jim Brady stated that its format would "combine what makes the Web interesting and what makes TV such an effective medium." The site started with around 50 staff members, including about 20 reporters and seven members of a community engagement team, and would highlight major, area-wide news and micro, neighborhood-level information. It would feature real-time reporting on stories, featuring content curated from independent blogs, along with original reporting from the site's staff and contributions from WJLA-TV and NewsChannel 8 reporters.

TBD.com officially launched on August 9, 2010, and replaced the websites for both WJLA-TV and NewsChannel 8. On the same day, NewsChannel 8 also re-launched itself as a television extension of the new site, known as TBD TV. TBD.com grew quickly, amassing 1.5 million unique viewers by January 2011. Major changes to the site's management were made as early as February 2011; WJLA's station manager Bill Lord took over control of TBD.com, and Saul Carlin was brought in to serve the new position of digital news director. Additionally, WJLA severed its ties to the website by bringing back its own website at WJLA.com, and TBD TV returned to its previous NewsChannel 8 branding. Erik Wemple stated that the changes were made to "more align the properties and to get more uniformity of management and direction," and to allow WJLA to return to having its own distinct online identity catered more to its television audience. No jobs were lost as part of the changes.

While TBD.com's readership steadily increased after its launch, the site struggled to sell advertising; ad sales were handled by WJLA's sales staff, who were inexperienced in selling advertising on digital platforms. As a result, Allbritton announced on February 23, 2011, that it would be making major changes to TBD.com and eliminating all but 8 positions at the site. Existing TBD.com employees were required to re-apply for the 8 remaining positions at the site, while most of its former staff were reassigned to work on WJLA.com instead. Additionally, TBD would also change its scope to only cover arts and entertainment. TBD.com would eventually be discontinued in August 2012, with the TBD.com domain name redirecting to the website of WJLA-TV. In 2014, Sinclair Broadcast Group would acquire Allbritton's stations, including WJLA and News Channel 8; also part of the deal was the TBD.com domain, which Sinclair would apply in 2017 to the website of its digital broadcast network, TBD.

== Staff ==
Jim Brady, a former executive editor of The Washington Post's website, ran the site with editor Erik Wemple, former editor of the Washington City Paper. Steve Buttry, named Editor & Publisher's 2010 Editor of the Year for his leadership in transforming a newsroom to adapt new technology and engage the community in deeper ways, was the site's director of community engagement. He led a team of community hosts and social media and mobile producers. Steve Chaggaris, formerly political director of CBS News, was the site's director of TV projects.
