= Jasmine Wright =

American journalist

- Born: Chicago, Illinois, U.S.
- Education: University of Illinois Urbana-Champaign (BA)
- Occupation: Journalist

Jasmine Wright is an American journalist. She currently is a journalist with NOTUS. Prior to her work with NOTUS, she was a White House and politics reporter with CNN, reporting during the 2018 and 2020 elections. She was also a reporter-producer with PBS News Hour, where she covered the Trump administration, North Korea, and climate change. She also provides political commentary to CNN, MS NOW, CBS News, and C-SPAN.

Her reporting with NOTUS on the 2024 Kamala Harris campaign earned her a nomination for the Livingston Award.

== Biography ==
Wright was born and raised in Chicago. She graduated with honors with a degree in broadcast journalism from the University of Illinois Urbana-Champaign. She is a member of the National Association of Black Journalists (NABJ). She interned with ABC News, NBC News, and Inked.

Wright worked with PBS News Hour, where she was the Political Unit's production assistant. She later would also report on various topics, including the Trump administration, North Korea, current affairs, climate change, among others. She covered the 2016 elections, the Mueller investigation, and Congress.

She later worked as a White House and politics report with CNN. During the 2020 elections, she covered the campaigns of Democratic presidential candidates Harris and Amy Klobuchar. Her time reporting was featured on the HBO Max documentary On the Trail: Inside the 2020 Primaries. During this time, she also contributed to the Atlanta Voice.

In December 2023, it was announced that Wright, along with Haley Byrd Wilt, would join NOTUS, a project created by the Allbritton Journalism Institute and intended to develop a base to train aspiring public affairs journalists, filling a gap formerly occupied by daily newspapers. Her work critically analyzing the failures of the 2024 Harris campaign, in particular issues with the campaign's staff, was well received critically. Nominated for the Livingston Award, she was a finalist.

In 2022, she was named a member of Forbes 30 Under 30 in the Media category. She resides in Washington, D.C.
