= Bob Ryan (meteorologist) =

American meteorologist

- Education: University at Albany, SUNY
- Occupation: Meteorologist

Bob Ryan is a retired meteorologist who most recently forecasted for WJLA, the ABC affiliate in Washington, D.C. Prior to serving as the chief meteorologist at Washington NBC affiliate WRC-TV from 1980 to 2010, he was previously the Today Show's first on-air meteorologist, which was also the first network television meteorologist position. When Willard Scott replaced Ryan on Today, he and Scott effectively exchanged jobs, with Ryan taking over the meteorologist position vacated by Scott on WRC.

The Washington Post announced on February 5, 2010 that he was in discussions with rival station WJLA, and that he could switch stations because his contract had expired. As NBC continued to cut positions in its newsroom, Ryan's workload increased and he had to cover the forecasts at 4, 5, 6, and 11 o'clock, making Ryan think about switching stations. Together with Doug Hill, chief meteorologist at WJLA and Ryan's longtime friend, he could make up a weather team that could take over WRC's dominant position in the ratings. He officially left the station in the early morning of February 26, 2010 after his last forecast after the Olympics.

In May 2010, it was announced that Ryan would be joining WJLA. Ryan made his debut during WJLA's 5 p.m. newscast on May 17, 2010. Ryan was the 11 p.m. newscast's meteorologist.

Ryan has a B.S. in physics and a M.S. in atmospheric science from the University at Albany. He worked as an atmospheric researcher at Arthur D. Little Inc. Afterwards, he became a meteorologist at WPRI-TV in Providence and WCVB-TV in Boston before working at The Today Show and finally at WRC.

Ryan is a past president of the American Meteorological Society, the first and only president to have worked in broadcast weather. He wrote and published the Weatherwise Almanac, an annual meteorology almanac for 25 years that detailed weather events of the year, such as moon phases, meteor showers, solstices and equinoxes. It also contained historical reference information, such as average highs and lows for each day of the year and significant weather events that happened on that date in history.

Ryan retired from WJLA after 33 years of forecasting the weather on television on May 22, 2013.
