= Morris Jones =

Morris Jones may refer to:

- Morris Jones (television journalist), American television journalist
- Morris Jones (footballer) (1919–1993), English footballer

== See also ==
- Henry Morris-Jones (1884–1972), Welsh doctor, soldier, politician
- John Morris-Jones (1864–1929), Welsh grammarian, academic and Welsh-language poet
- Maurice Jones (disambiguation)
