= Veronica Johnson =

American meteorologist

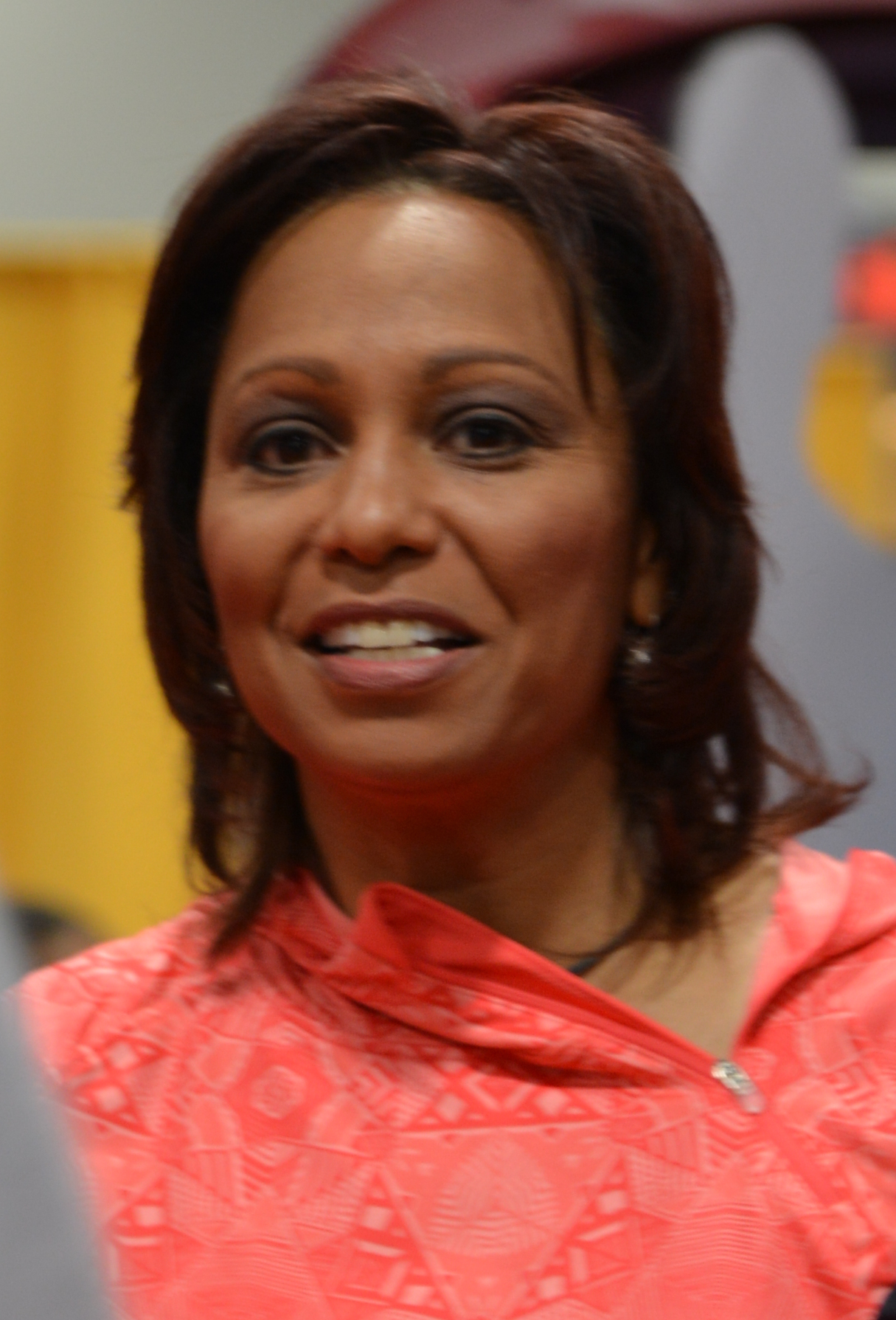
Johnson in 2015

Veronica Johnson is an American meteorologist who is the chief meteorologist at WJLA-TV. She was named a Fellow of the American Meteorological Society since 2011.

== Biography ==
As a child, at the age of 12, Johnson became interested in the weather, an interest that grew while she was in Air Force ROTC training in high school. Johnson earned her undergraduate degree at the University of North Carolina at Asheville. While in college she specialized in atmospheric sciences, and worked at the National Climactic Data Center. She started her career at The Weather Channel, and then moved to Baltimore where she worked at WBFF, also known as Fox Channel 45. She then moved to WABC-TV in New York, and WMAR in Baltimore. Johnson left WMAR in 1999, partially because she was unable to accept the magnitude of the pay cut offered at the time. She joined News4 in 2000, and was appointed to the board of the American Meteorological Society in 2005.

When her colleague, chief meteorologist Doug Hill, announced that he was retiring in 2016, Johnson attempted to take the lead. However, the network did not appoint her, despite her considerable expertise and experience. She moved to WJLA-TV in 2016, and was named chief meteorologist there in December 2022.

Johnson also does outreach events introducing K-12 students to careers in STEM, participated in a news story about public opinion of weather forecasters, and brought Conan O'Brien onto her weathercast in 2009.

== Awards and honors ==
In 2011, she was elected a Fellow of the American Meteorological Society. In 2021, she was inducted in the Silver Circle of the National Capital Emmys for her contributions to meteorology.

== Personal life ==
Johnson is married to Dwight Weems. They have three children, and in 1999 she talked about how she adapted her clothing for on-air appearances while she was pregnant with her son.

== Selected publications ==
- Johnson, Veronica (April 2003). "The Weather Channel: The Improbable Rise of a Media Phenomenon". Bulletin of the American Meteorological Society; Boston. 84 (4): 493–494.
