= Andrea McCarren =

Andrea McCarren is an American television journalist and educator.

== Education and private life ==
After attending Vassar College in Poughkeepsie, New York, McCarren attended the London School of Economics. She earned an anthropology degree, cum laude. Thereafter, she attended graduate school at the University of Southern California School of Journalism on a KCBS-TV Fellowship. She shares three children with husband Bill McCarren, the executive director of the National Press Club.

== Career ==
McCarren has served as a local reporter in multiple cities across the United States prior to beginning her career reporting news in Washington D.C. in 1991 at WUSA-TV, the CBS station. She covered the presidency of Bill Clinton for ABC and served as DC correspondent for NBC. She has traveled to and reported on stories in El Salvador and joined Clinton multiple times on Air Force One. She also served as an investigative reporter for WJLA-TV in D.C., until economic downturns in 2009 led the station to terminate her employment with 25 other staff members.

McCarren is also an educator. The first teacher of broadcast journalism at Harvard University, she taught a curriculum of her own design.

Among other honors, McCarren is the recipient of an Edward R. Murrow Award and the Nieman Fellowship at Harvard.

Andrea McCarren has been promoted to PenFed Foundation President and Senior Vice President for PenFed Digital. She is a nationally known advocate for veterans and military families.
