= The Washington Sun =

American digital news outlet

- Logo used since 2026
- Industry: News
- Founded: 2023
- Key people: Robert Allbritton (publisher); Tim Grieve (editor-in-chief)
- Owner: NOTUS Media, LLC
- Website: washingtonsun.com

The Washington Sun, formerly NOTUS ("News of the United States"), is a digital news outlet owned by NOTUS Media, LLC and affiliated with the Allbritton Journalism Institute, a nonprofit organization founded by Politico founder Robert Allbritton in 2023.

As NOTUS, the outlet focused on coverage of national political news in the United States from 2023 to 2026. In April 2026, the outlet announced plans to rebrand as The Star and expand to include coverage of local news in the Washington, D.C. area, including local politics, sports, and food coverage, among other topics, hiring many former employees of The Washington Post to fill those roles after major layoffs at the Post.

Following a lawsuit filed over a copyright dispute involving the proposed name change, the publication cancelled its plans to change its name to The Star. In September 2026, it was announced that NOTUS would instead rebrand as The Washington Sun and implement a paywall.

== History ==
Robert Allbritton, a founder of Politico, established the Allbritton Journalism Institute in 2023 with a personal grant of $20 million. According to Allbritton, he intended to create an outlet to train aspiring public affairs journalists, filling a gap formerly occupied by daily newspapers.

NOTUS named longtime Bloomberg L.P. executive Arielle Elliott its first CEO in March 2025.

In March 2026, Semafor reported that Allbritton had plans to rebrand NOTUS and double its staff in response to large-scale layoffs at The Washington Post. He and his leadership team intended to build the "next great Washington newspaper."

In April 2026, editor-in-chief Tim Grieve announced that NOTUS would be renamed The Star effective in June of that year, with increased coverage of local news and sports in the Washington area as well as the White House and Congress. Ahead of the rebranding, NOTUS hired multiple reporters who were formerly with The Washington Post. On June 2, 2026, federal judge Rossie D. Alston Jr. in Northern Virginia blocked the renaming due to a trademark dispute with the revived version of The Washington Star.

In September 2026, The New York Times reported that NOTUS had dropped its plan to rebrand as The Star, and would instead rebrand as The Washington Sun.

== Organization ==
The Washington Sun operates as a website at washingtonsun.com and publishes a daily newsletter. It also distributes its content to local nonprofit news organizations such as Oklahoma Watch, the Santa Barbara News-Press, and others. In addition to its endowment from Allbritton, the Washington Sun has received funding from the Henry L. Kimelman Family Foundation, the Sandpiper Fund, the Google News Initiative, corporate advertisers, and syndication fees paid by its local news partners.

== Staff ==
As NOTUS, the outlet focused its coverage on the politics of the United States. Consequently, it was staffed by a combination of experienced professional journalists and term-limited "fellows" selected annually from recent university graduates and early-career journalists for a paid, 24-month reporting position, preceded by a month-long immersion course in Washington, D.C., and supplemented by guest courses taught by veteran reporters. Some of the senior editors have included Richard Just, Matt Fuller, Kate Nocera, and Matt Berman.

As part of the outlet's rebranding as The Washington Sun in 2026, the outlet has expanded beyond its national politics coverage to cover local news in the Washington, D.C. area, more than doubling its headcount in the process from 45 to 110. Of these, 28 were former employees of The Washington Post. In addition to their-house reporting staff, the Sun reached an exclusive licensing agreement with Capital Weather, a weather forecasting website that had previously licensed exclusively with the Washington Post since 2008, to provide local weather coverage for the outlet.

Notable journalists on The Washington Sun's staff include Jasmine Wright, Oriana González, Evan McMorris-Santoro, Tom Sietsema, and Dana Milbank.

Arielle Elliott is The Washington Sun's CEO.

== See also ==
- Institute for Nonprofit News
