= Joe Allbritton =

American banker, publisher and philanthropist

- Allbritton in 1970
- Born: December 29, 1924; D'Lo, Mississippi, U.S.
- Died: December 12, 2012 (aged 87); Houston, Texas, U.S.
- Education: Baylor University
- Occupations: Businessperson, banker, publisher
- Spouse: Barbara Allbritton
- Children: Robert Allbritton

Joe Lewis Allbritton (December 29, 1924 – December 12, 2012) was an American banker, publisher and philanthropist.

== Early life ==
Joe Allbritton was born on December 29, 1924, in D'Lo, Mississippi, the sixth of seven children. His family soon relocated to Houston, Texas, where his father owned a small business. Allbritton served in the United States Navy during World War II. He completed his undergraduate degree and law degree from Baylor University, where he was a national champion debater.

== Business ==
After naval service and law school, he borrowed $5,000 to buy land outside Houston, which was later used in the construction of a freeway connecting Houston and Galveston, earning Allbritton a small fortune. He also chaired Houston International Bank, Houston Citizens Bank and University Bankshares.

In 1975, he purchased The Washington Star along with its television station and smaller stations in the south. In 1978, he was forced to divest the newspaper. This became the foundation of his company, Allbritton Communications, which includes WJLA-TV, NewsChannel 8, short lived Internet venture TBD, and Politico, now run by his son, Robert Allbritton.

From 1981 to 2001, he was chairman of Riggs Bank. In 1992, he sold the Los Angeles based Pierce National Life Insurance Co. that he had owned since 1958. Ten years after acquiring Riggs Bank, the bank started to under perform, causing great financial distress on Allbritton. He resigned due to prostate cancer during investigation by the Securities and Exchange Commission involving oil money from Equatorial Guinea at the same time that Riggs was facing broader charges of money laundering; his son Robert assumed the chairman position after his resignation; the bank was later purchased by PNC in 2005. The Riggs Bank was also investigated for concealing Pinochet's money, an investigation that revealed direct ties between the dictator and Joe Allbritton. He remained a member of the board of Riggs Bank's parent company Riggs National Corporation until 2004.

== Philanthropy ==
Allbritton and his wife, Barbara, were major contributors through to numerous organizations through the Allbritton Foundation. Organizations they donated to including the Baylor College of Medicine, the Allbritton Art Institute, the Oxford Scholars, and the establishment of the International School of Law, which has become the George Mason University School of Law.

He sat on the boards of the John F. Kennedy Center for the Performing Arts and Museum of Fine Arts, Houston. Albritton funded the official White House portrait Ronald Reagan by Everett Raymond Kinstler, which is part of the art collection of the White House. He contributed to Washington National Cathedral, where he was made a Lay canon.

== Thoroughbred racing ==
Allbritton also made a name for himself in thoroughbred horse racing. In 1991, his 3-year-old horse, Hansel, won two legs of the U.S. Triple Crown series, the Preakness and the Belmont stakes.

== Death ==
He died on December 12, 2012, aged 87, of heart trouble, in Houston, Texas. He is survived by his widow, Barbara, and their son, Robert and three grandchildren.
