= Capitol News Company =

American media company

Capitol News Company, LLC was an American media company based in Arlington, Virginia, United States, privately owned by Robert L. Allbritton. Its primary publication was Politico Pro, which was acquired by Axel Springer SE, a German publisher in 2021.

== History ==
Capitol News Company was created when Politico (founded in 2007) was spun out of Allbritton Communications Company in 2009. The company also publishes Politico New York, a web site and magazine focused on the politics of New York City and New York state, as well as the inner workings of the New York-based news media, and which later expanded to cover New Jersey and Florida before being rebranded as Politico websites.

In 2020, it launched Protocol, a publication covering the people, power and politics of tech.

In 2021 Politico and Protocol were acquired by Axel Springer SE, a German publisher for US$1billion.
