= Dana Milbank =

American journalist (born 1968)

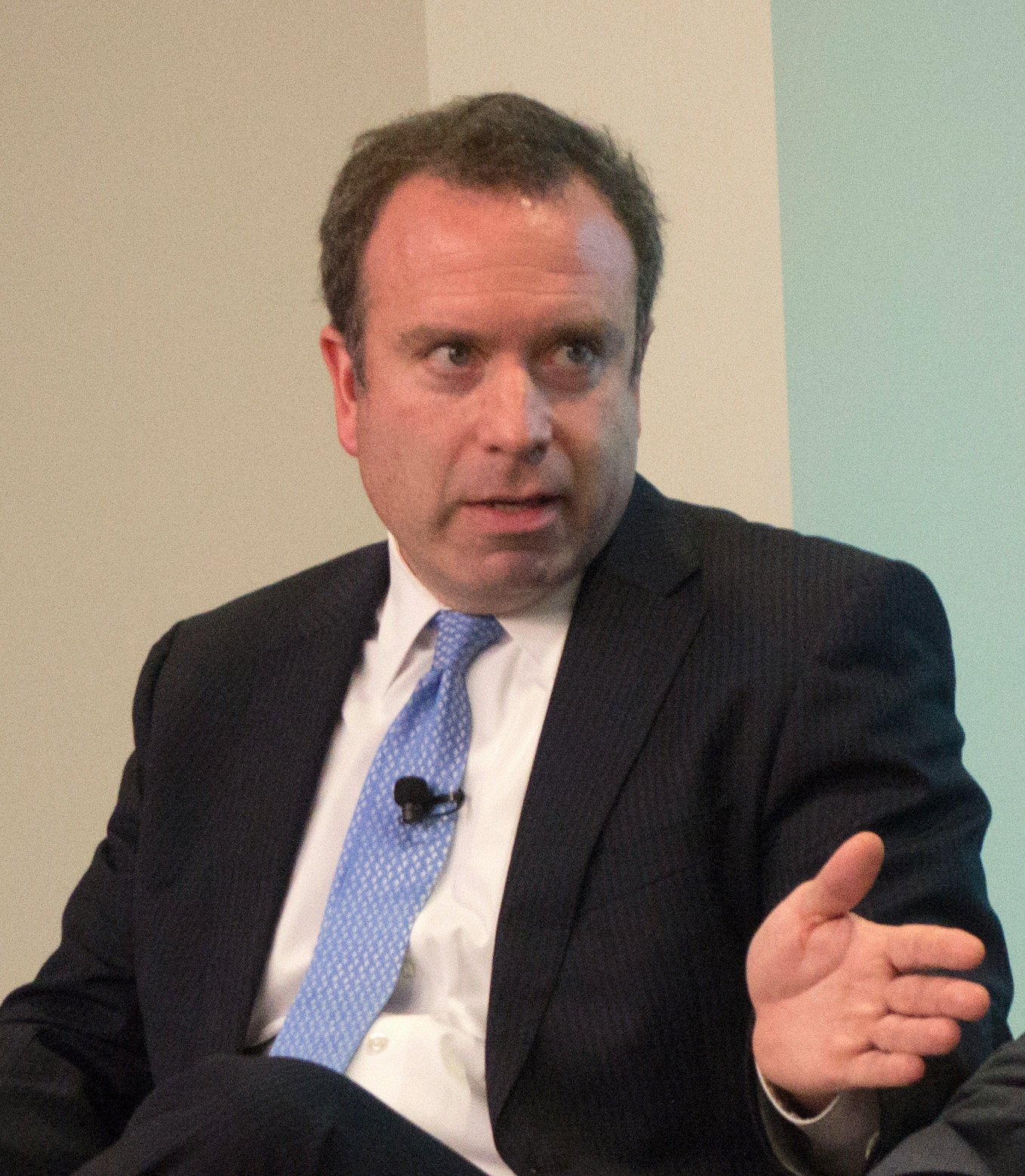
- Milbank in 2016
- Born: Dana Timothy Milbank; April 27, 1968 (age 58)
- Education: Yale University (BA)
- Spouses: Donna DePasquale (m. 1993; div. 2015); Anna Greenberg (m. 2017)

Dana Timothy Milbank (born April 27, 1968) is an American author and columnist. He has written books about Al Gore, George W. Bush, Glenn Beck, American politics, and the Republican Party. As a columnist, he has worked for The Washington Post and currently writes for The Washington Sun. He has appeared as a pundit on various shows.

== Early life and education ==
Milbank was born to a Jewish family, the son of Ann C. and Mark A. Milbank. He is a graduate of Yale University, where he was a member of Trumbull College, the Progressive Party of the Yale Political Union and the secret society Skull and Bones. He is a graduate of Sanford H. Calhoun High School in Merrick, New York.

== Career ==
Milbank worked for eight years for The Wall Street Journal covering Congress and two years for The New Republic covering the Clinton White House. In 2000, he moved to The Washington Post. In 2026, he began writing for The Washington Sun.

Milbank covered the 2000 and 2004 presidential elections for the Post. He also covered President George W. Bush's first term in office. After Bush won the 2000 election, Karl Rove asked the Post not to assign Milbank to cover White House news. In 2001, a pool report penned by Milbank which covered a Bush visit to the U.S. Capitol generated controversy within conservative circles. According to Milbank, the nickname given to him by the president is "not printable in a family publication."

Milbank wrote "Washington Sketch" for the Post, an observational column about political theater in the White House, Congress, and elsewhere in the capital.

Milbank was criticized for a July 30, 2008 article in which, in part by using snippets of quotations, he portrayed Barack Obama as being presumptuous. A few days later MSNBC's Keith Olbermann stated that Milbank would not be allowed back onto his show, which Milbank had appeared on since 2004, until Milbank submitted "a correction or an explanation." However, Milbank had apparently already left Olbermann's show for another show on CNN. Milbank stated that he has been dissatisfied since he was criticized by Olbermann's staff over making a positive comment about Charlie Black, a John McCain senior advisor, and as a result had already been negotiating with CNN.

Milbank and Chris Cillizza appeared in a series of humor videos called "Mouthpiece Theater" which appeared on The Washington Post's website. An outcry followed a 2009 video in which, during a discussion of the White House "Beer Summit", they chose new brands for a number of people, including "Mad Bitch Beer" for Hillary Clinton. Both men apologized for the video and the series was canceled.

In July 2025, Milbank moved to the Futures Desk of the Washington Post, where he wrote a weekly column on reconnecting with nature and restoring humanity in our technological age. Several of his columns were based on his experience as the owner of a small farm in Virginia.

In May 2026, he announced that he would be returning to writing on political topics as a columnist for the internet site News of the United States (NOTUS), now known as The Washington Sun.

== Personal life ==
In 1993, Milbank married Donna Lynn DePasquale in an interfaith Jewish and Roman Catholic ceremony. After that marriage ended in divorce, in 2017 he married Anna Greenberg, daughter of Democratic pollster Stan Greenberg and stepdaughter of Democratic Congresswoman Rosa DeLauro (CT).

== Books ==
Milbank is the author of Smash Mouth: Two Years in the Gutter with Al Gore and George W. Bush—Notes from the 2000 Campaign Trail.

Homo Politicus: The Strange and Scary Tribes that Run Our Government was published by Random House in January 2008.

In 2010, Doubleday released Milbank's polemic biography of conservative pundit Glenn Beck: Tears of a Clown: Glenn Beck and the Tea Bagging of America, which a review in Milbank's paper, The Washington Post, said was a "droll, take-no-prisoners account of the nation's most audacious conspiracy-spinner."

In 2022, Milbank authored The Destructionists: The 25-Year Crack-Up of the Republican Party.

== Political views ==
Milbank has stated that his policy on United States presidential elections is to vote for the best candidate who is not on the ballot. He voted for John McCain in 2000, Chuck Hagel in 2004, and Michael Bloomberg in 2008. He explained that his approach allows him to "go through the exercise of who would be a good president" while avoiding committing to one candidate or another in the race.

Greg Marx, associate editor of the Columbia Journalism Review, describes Milbank as "extravagantly contrarian". New York University journalism professor Jay Rosen wrote of "Milbank's insistence on characterizing political debate as consisting of two unreasonable poles, and himself as a truth-teller caught in the middle — a posture so habitual and inflexible that it has become an ideology".

Milbank has criticized the growth of the White House Correspondents' Dinner, writing in 2011 that the event "was a minor annoyance for years, when it was a 'nerd prom' for journalists and a few minor celebrities. But, as with so much else in this town, the event has spun out of control. Now, awash in lobbyist and corporate money, it is another display of Washington's excesses."
