= Maureen Bunyan =

American journalist

- Born: February 27, 1944 (age 81); Aruba

Maureen Bunyan (born February 27, 1946, in Aruba) is an Aruban-American Washington, D.C.–based television journalist. She was the lead co-anchor at WUSA for 22 years from 1973 to 1995. In 1999 she returned to television when she co-anchored WJLA-TV, helping them to rise to number two in the market.

Bunyan is a founder and board member of IWMF (International Women's Media Foundation), a founder of the National Association of Black Journalists. and President of Maureen Bunyan Communications, Inc.

She was named a "Washingtonian of the Year" in 1992 and has been inducted into the Hall of Fame of the Washington Chapter of the Society of Professional Journalists, "The Silver Circle" of the National Academy of Television Arts and Sciences (NATAS), and the Broadcast Pioneers Club of Washington.

== Biography ==
=== Early life ===
Bunyan was the eldest of three daughters, and settled in Milwaukee, Wisconsin, with her family when she was 11. Her parents are Wilhelmina and Arthur who are from Guyana and immigrated to Aruba. After the death of her mother Wilhelmina, a nurse, Bunyan and her family continued to pursue educational opportunities; at one point, all of the members of the immediate family were enrolled at local colleges and universities, each studying for an undergraduate degree.

=== Early career ===
Bunyan started her journalism career freelancing at the Milwaukee Journal while attending the University of Wisconsin–Milwaukee nearby, then went on to television jobs at WGBH-TV in Boston and WCBS-TV in New York City before arriving in Washington in 1973 and joining WTOP-TV (now WUSA-TV), a station that was known for its Eyewitness News team that included Max Robinson, Gordon Peterson and Warner Wolf.

=== Promotion to anchor ===
Originally a reporter and weekend co-anchor with Patrick McGrath, Bunyan was promoted to co-anchor alongside Gordon Peterson at 6 p.m. after Robinson joined ABC News in 1978 (she would add the 11 p.m. newscast a decade later) and settled in as a member of a local news team that also included sportscaster Glenn Brenner and meteorologist Gordon Barnes. In addition to reporting on major local, national and international stories, she also hosted the award-winning magazine programs 22:26 and Studio Nine.

=== Leaving WUSA ===
On December 11, 1995, after the management at WUSA offered her an anchor demotion and salary cut to stay at the station, Bunyan surprised viewers when she announced her resignation on the air during the 6 p.m. news. Channel 9 soon afterwards lost their first-place spot in the ratings to rival WRC-TV.

=== Return to the DC airwaves ===
Bunyan briefly worked for MSNBC and ran a public relations firm for a few years before returning to the Washington airwaves in February 1999, replacing Paul Berry as the lead anchor at WJLA-TV. Five years later, she was reunited with longtime friend and former WUSA co-anchor Gordon Peterson when they were teamed up on the 6 p.m. news. That pairing helped WJLA move from third to second place in that timeslot behind current leader WRC.

On January 9. 2017, Sinclair Broadcasting, the owners of WJLA, announced her contract was not being renewed. Her last evening newscast with WJLA was on January 31, 2017.

== Personal life ==
During the many years she has worked in Washington, she has received numerous awards. Ms. Bunyan also attended Columbia University Graduate School of Journalism and Harvard University Graduate School of Education, where she earned a master's degree in 1980.

== Awards ==
- Foremother Award from The National Center for Health Research, 2017
