= Morris Jones (television journalist) =

American journalist

Morris Jones is an American television journalist.

He was the anchor of Sinclair Broadcast Group's News Central broadcast which originated from Sinclair's suburban Baltimore (Hunt Valley) headquarters. There he co-anchored many news broadcasts on Sinclair stations throughout the United States. He was formerly anchor at WTTG, where he worked from 1983 to 2001. Before that he was briefly the anchor at WTLV-TV, in Jacksonville, Florida.

On May 1, 2010 he rejoined the Washington DC market. He joined Allbritton's TBD TV (which itself reverted to its previous branding, NewsChannel 8, the following year) as its new weekday evening anchor, replacing Beverly Kirk. Jones left NewsChannel 8 at the end of May 2016.

Jones cameos as himself on the Netflix series House of Cards, the American adaption of the BBC series of the same name.
