= Maurice Jones (disambiguation) =

Maurice Jones (born 1964) is an American executive and former official in the US Department of Housing and Urban Development.

Maurice Jones may also refer to:

- Maurice Jones (priest), (1863–1957), priest and university educator
- Maurice Jones (basketball) (born 1991), American basketball player

== See also ==
- Maurice Jones-Drew (born 1985), American football player
- Morris Jones (disambiguation)
