= Glenn Brenner =

American sportscaster (1948–1992)

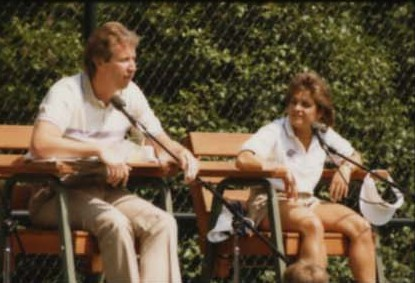
- Brenner interviewing Mary Lou Retton, 1986
- Born: January 2, 1948; Philadelphia, Pennsylvania, U.S.
- Died: January 14, 1992 (aged 44); Washington, D.C., U.S.
- Resting place: Oak Hill Cemetery; Washington, D.C., U.S.
- Occupations: Journalist; radio personality; sports commentator; television personality
- Years active: 1972–1991
- Spouse: Linda Suzanne "Susie" Burner Brenner
- Children: 3

Glenn Brenner (January 2, 1948 – January 14, 1992) was a broadcast journalist and sports commentator in Washington, D.C., in the United States from 1977 to 1991. He was best known as the sports anchor for WUSA-TV from 1977 until 1991. At the time of his death in 1992 from a brain tumor, he was not only the most highly paid broadcast journalist in Washington but also the most popular broadcaster in the D.C. metropolitan area.

== Life and career ==
=== Early life ===
Glenn Brenner was born on January 2, 1948, in Philadelphia, Pennsylvania, to Bill and Edie Brenner. At the age of four, he wanted to be a major league baseball player.

Brenner attended Abraham Lincoln High School. By the time he was in his senior year, however, basketball seemed to be in Brenner's future, as he was already 6 feet 5 inches (1.96 m) tall. He led his high school basketball team to 26 straight victories. In his senior year in 1965, Lincoln High School lost the city championship game to Bishop Neumann High School, 75 to 66. Baseball remained Brenner's dream, however. Even though he only had one good pitch (a fastball), the New York Mets signed him to a minor league contract after he graduated from high school. He played for the Marion Mets in the Appalachian League, and eventually was brought up to play Class AA baseball. But in 1969, Brenner hurt his arm while playing in the Florida Instructional League, and the Mets sold him to the Philadelphia Phillies. He played Class AAA baseball in the Mexican League, but continuing problems with his throwing arm forced him to quit baseball in 1972.

Brenner knew early that he was not going to have much of a career in professional baseball. While still playing with the Mets, coach Birdie Tebbetts watched him pitch a terrible game. When Tebbetts came out to the mound, Brenner asked him what was wrong. Tebbetts replied, "Horse-spit pitcher"—and Brenner knew his time in the big leagues was finished. While playing minor league baseball, Brenner attended Temple University and then Saint Joseph's University in Philadelphia. He graduated from Saint Joseph's with a bachelor's degree in political science and Communication studies.

=== Early broadcasting career ===
Brenner sold cars for a few months before turning to sports broadcasting after leaving the Phillies. His first job was with radio station WMVB in Millville, New Jersey. He read an advertisement for the position, and applied. He later said, "I lied so bad to get that first job. I told the boss I was an announcer from Philadelphia, and he took that to mean I was a Philadelphia announcer. I had never even been inside a radio station." Brenner was paid $79 a week, and commuted from Philadelphia to Millville every day. The job lasted only a short period of time, and Brenner moved to New Haven, Connecticut, to seek work. After living there only a short time, he returned to Philadelphia and joined radio station WFIL, where he worked for two years as a news reporter and in promotions. Brenner turned to sportscasting in 1975, and took a position at WOWK-TV in Huntington, West Virginia.

Brenner's big break came in 1976, when he joined KYW-TV in Philadelphia. Brenner developed his on-air personality during his stint at KYW, becoming well known for his humor and irreverence. He often called the scoreboard the "boreboard", and made jokes about himself, sports teams, and athletes on the air (much to management's discomfort). In one well-known incident, KYW introduced a flashy, high-technology set that resembled the bridge of the Starship Enterprise. When the news anchor turned to Brenner to ask for the sports report, Brenner stood and announced, "We, the jury, find the defendant not guilty!" The angry news director resolved to fire Brenner as soon as a replacement could be found.

=== Career at WUSA ===
KYW's news director happened to know Jim Snyder, the news director at WTOP-TV (as WUSA was then known) in Washington, D.C. He mentioned Brenner's on-air stunt, and told Snyder that Brenner would be let go in a short time. Intrigued with Brenner's on-air personality, Snyder reviewed tapes of Brenner's work and liked what he saw.

WTOP-TV was seeking a new sports anchor to replace local sports broadcaster Warner Wolf, who had left the WTOP-TV for a job with ABC Sports. The station had hired Mike Wolfe as the weeknight sportscaster, while weekend duties were held by Klaus Wagner. But Wagner wasn't working out, and WTOP-TV declined to renew his one-year contract. Brenner made his D.C. debut on March 4, 1977. Wolfe was fired on March 22, and Brenner was appointed his replacement. Wolfe had adopted a very macho and aggressive style on the air, including an unbuttoned dress shirt and a "take it or shove it" attitude towards fans and athletes that grated on many viewers. When evening news ratings began to decline, the station dismissed Wolfe with nine months left in his contract. Brenner was named the weeknight sportscaster.

Brenner's on-air style was to mix humor with sports. He told The Washington Post, "I'm talking to a group of people who are not that interested in what I have to say. They've proven that statistically. So what I want to do is keep their interest. And the way I can best do that is to relate to them." One of his signature bits included the "Weenie of the Week", in which he poked fun at bombastic professional athletes or unsportsmanlike behavior. When egotistical athletes did things which embarrassed others, Brenner often took them to task during the "Weenie of the Week" segment. In November 1987, Washington Redskins football players Clarence Verdin and Ricky Sanders performed "The Star-Spangled Banner" at Madison Square Garden (forgetting the words and singing off-key) on Veterans Day; Brenner mixed footage of their performance with footage of actress Pia Zadora similarly mangling the national anthem at a National Basketball Association game. Hundreds of angry fans complained, and Brenner apologized at both the 6:00 p.m. and 11:00 p.m. newscasts the next day. But he refused to read an additional statement on the air, and was given a one-day suspension. Jibes at athletes, sports team owners, and others were common during Brenner's career, and yet he was so respected and well-liked that few people ever became angry with him.

Another of Brenner's gimmicks was his Friday night "mystery picker"—a local or national celebrity who would be asked to pick winners of various athletic contests. Among the "mystery pickers" were CBS News co-anchor Connie Chung, former Washington Redskins quarterback Sonny Jurgensen, boxer Sugar Ray Leonard, CBS News anchor Dan Rather, comedian Paul Reubens, Redskins quarterback Mark Rypien, actor William Shatner, singing group The Temptations, and local nun Sister Marie Louise Kirkland. Sister Marie Louise turned out to be a phenomenally good sports prognosticator, and Brenner's repeated use of her became an international story. People magazine made it a cover story.

Viewers also enjoyed Brenner's banter with WTOP-TV news anchor Gordon Peterson, an authoritative figure in a three-piece suit with much on-air gravitas. Brenner often ribbed Peterson for his lifelong support of the also-ran Boston Red Sox major league baseball team. Brenner and Peterson became best of friends, and their jokes at one another's expense became local legend. One of Peterson's favorite bits was to keep speaking, using up the five minutes allotted to Brenner for sports news. Brenner would be forced to read the sports news as fast as he could, and then collapsed on the desk as if exhausted. In another common gag, Brenner would turn to Peterson and say, "You can ask me anything you want because you're the anchor"—at which point Peterson would attempt to stump Brenner with sports trivia or ask some embarrassing question.

Later at WTOP-TV, Brenner invented "Encore Wednesday". Since sports news was slow during mid-week, Brenner decided to highlight great sports moments each Wednesday night as a means of filling time and giving sports fans knowledge about their sport's great moments.

Brenner also moved beyond nightly news. In the early 1980s, Brenner teamed with former Redskins quarterback Sonny Jurgensen to host the popular Redskins Sidelines Sunday afternoon sports show, which focused on the Redskins football team.

Brenner became one of the city's most popular broadcasters. His fans included President Ronald Reagan (himself a former sportscaster), Reagan's successor as president, George H. W. Bush, his wife Barbara, and CBS News anchor Dan Rather.

In 1981, Brenner signed a contract with what was by then WDVM-TV (which WTOP-TV had changed its call letters to on June 26, 1978) that paid him $750,000 a year, paid his children's college tuition, and included a $1 million life insurance policy. The long-term contract was believed by The Washington Post to be a record for both the high level of pay and benefits as well as the long number of years it covered. On July 4, 1986, WDVM-TV changed its call letters to WUSA.

Brenner signed a five-year contract with WUSA in 1991 which paid him almost $1 million a year. The contract included a deferred salary, and paid his children's college tuition. (Note: In 1992, Brenner had three children: Amy, age 13; Ashley, age 10; and Matthew, age 8.)

Brenner was nominated for and won numerous Associated Press and United Press International local broadcasting awards. The National Association of Sportswriters and Sportscasters named him "Washington Sportscaster of the Year" in 1989 and 1990.

== Death ==
On November 3, 1991, Brenner participated in the Marine Corps Marathon in Washington, D.C. He fell ill after crossing the finish line, and his physicians diagnosed a "vascular event". Two blood vessels in his head had ruptured and he had numbness on his left side, slight slurring of speech, and double vision. His doctors at George Washington University Hospital ruled out a stroke, however. Brenner began physical therapy. But on November 17, 1991, The Washington Post reported that Brenner's doctor, Arthur I. Kobrine, confirmed the broadcaster had suffered a cerebral hemorrhage. He underwent an MR angiogram and a radiographical angiogram, but neither showed anything abnormal.

Brenner's physical condition initially improved. He was released from the hospital after Thanksgiving. He began to regain use of his left arm, he was walking again, and the double vision had largely gone away. Although he was expected to return to the air in early January, Brenner began suffering from vomiting and dizziness. WUSA said he would not return to the air for another four to six weeks. On Friday, January 10, 1992, Brenner's physical condition declined rapidly and he was taken to George Washington University Hospital. An MRI later that day revealed a large mass in the brainstem. At 9:30 a.m. on January 11, surgeons operated on Brenner for four hours and discovered an inoperable malignant brain tumor. Bleeding in the brain had masked the tumor in previous exams. His prognosis was "poor," and he was listed in critical condition.

On Sunday, January 12, the Washington Redskins dedicated their NFC Championship game to Brenner. The Redskins handily defeated the Detroit Lions, 41-to-10, and went on to win Super Bowl XXVI two weeks later. Redskins coach Joe Gibbs brought the Championship game ball to Brenner in the hospital.

Brenner died at 7:58 a.m. on Tuesday, January 14, 1992 (just 12 days after his 44th birthday) at George Washington University Hospital. WUSA aired a half-hour special that night covering his career. Many citizens in the D.C. area were in shock for several days. President George H. W. Bush issued a statement upon Brenner's death, which said, "Barbara and I are greatly saddened by the untimely death of Glenn Brenner, a man whose wit and ability has endeared him to so many Washingtonians. The suddenness of his death, and the warmth of his personality, leave all of us with a painful emptiness." Former President Ronald Reagan also issued a statement, in which he said, "Today the entire Washington community mourns the loss of Glenn Brenner, a dear friend to all of us who knew him. He truly was a broadcasting great, bringing sports to life with his talent and dedication. Glenn set a wonderful example by his constant involvement in local causes and displayed a real concern for his community."

Brenner's funeral was held at National Presbyterian Church in Washington, D.C. on January 17, 1992. More than 1,500 mourners attended. He was buried at Oak Hill Cemetery in the Georgetown neighborhood of the city.

=== Legacy ===
In a 2010 retrospective, former WTTG and WUSA sportscaster Brett Haber noted that Brenner was well known outside the mid-Atlantic region. Brenner also continued to be the standard to which all regional sports broadcasters aspired, even 18 years after his death.

I was aware of him, aware that he was the standard for smart funny sportscasters. But when you become a sportscaster in Washington, as I did in 1997, people will teach you about the lore of Washington, and you hear about Bernie Smilovitz and Warner Wolf, and you hear all about Glenn Brenner. If you do what I do where I do it, you know that Glenn and Gordon Peterson built the dynasty that Channel 9 became. So even though I didn't live through Glenn, I understand what he accomplished and why he was so good. Katie Couric never worked with Walter Cronkite, but she damn near knows where she sits. I feel a special kinship with Glenn's memory, and I feel a certain responsibility to remember him and what he did, and that he was special.

The Washington City Paper said that sportscaster George Michael might have been better-known nationwide due to his George Michael's Sports Machine, but that Michael remained the Salieri to Brenner's Mozart. The newspaper's Dave McKenna noted, "I worshipped Brenner. Everybody I knew around here when Brenner was on the air worshipped the guy."

The Washington, D.C. chapter of the National Academy of Television Arts and Sciences named its Glenn Brenner Award for Excellence in Sportscasting after him.

== Bibliography ==
- Benedetto, Robert; Du Vall, Kathleen; Donovan, Jane (2001). Historical Dictionary of Washington, D.C. Lanham, Maryland: Scarecrow Press. ISBN 0810840944.
- Holliday, Johnny; Moore, Stephen (2002). Johnny Holliday: From Rock to Jock. Champaign, Ill.: Sports Publishing. p. 215. ISBN 158261461X. "Sister Mary Louise sports Brenner."
- Thomas, Gary (2011). Thirsting for God. Eugene, Ore.: Harvest House. ISBN 9780736928908.
