= Robert Allbritton =

American chief executive, publisher and editor

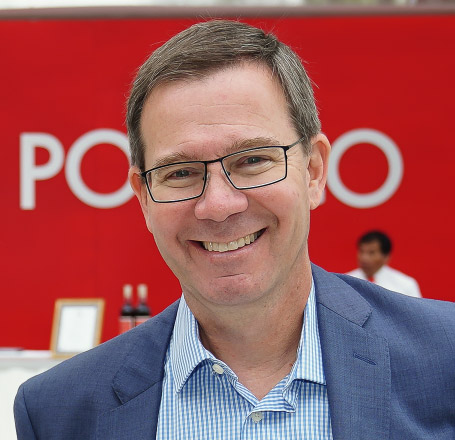
- Born: February 16, 1969 (age 57); Houston, Texas, U.S.
- Education: Wesleyan University (BA)
- Father: Joe Allbritton

Robert Lewis Allbritton (born February 16, 1969) is the founder of the news website The Washington Sun (formerly NOTUS) and the nonprofit Allbritton Journalism Institute. He is the founder and former owner of Capitol News Company, the parent company of Capitol Hill political newspaper and website Politico which in 2021 was acquired by Axel Springer SE, a German news publisher and media company, for over $1 billion.

Allbritton also served as the chairman and CEO of Allbritton Communications, which owned several ABC-affiliated television stations in Washington, D.C. Allbritton was previously the final CEO of Riggs National Corporation, the parent of Riggs Bank, from 2001 to 2005, when PNC Bank acquired the bank amidst the money laundering scandal that involved the Allbritton family with the former Chilean dictator Augusto Pinochet, which led him and his family to agree to pay US$1 million to a fund for victims of crimes against humanity during Pinochet's rule.

Allbritton has been described by The New Republic as having "reshaped the way we follow politics." He is a trustee of the Lyndon Baines Johnson Library and Museum.

In October 2011, Allbritton was included on The New Republic's list of Washington's most powerful, least famous people.

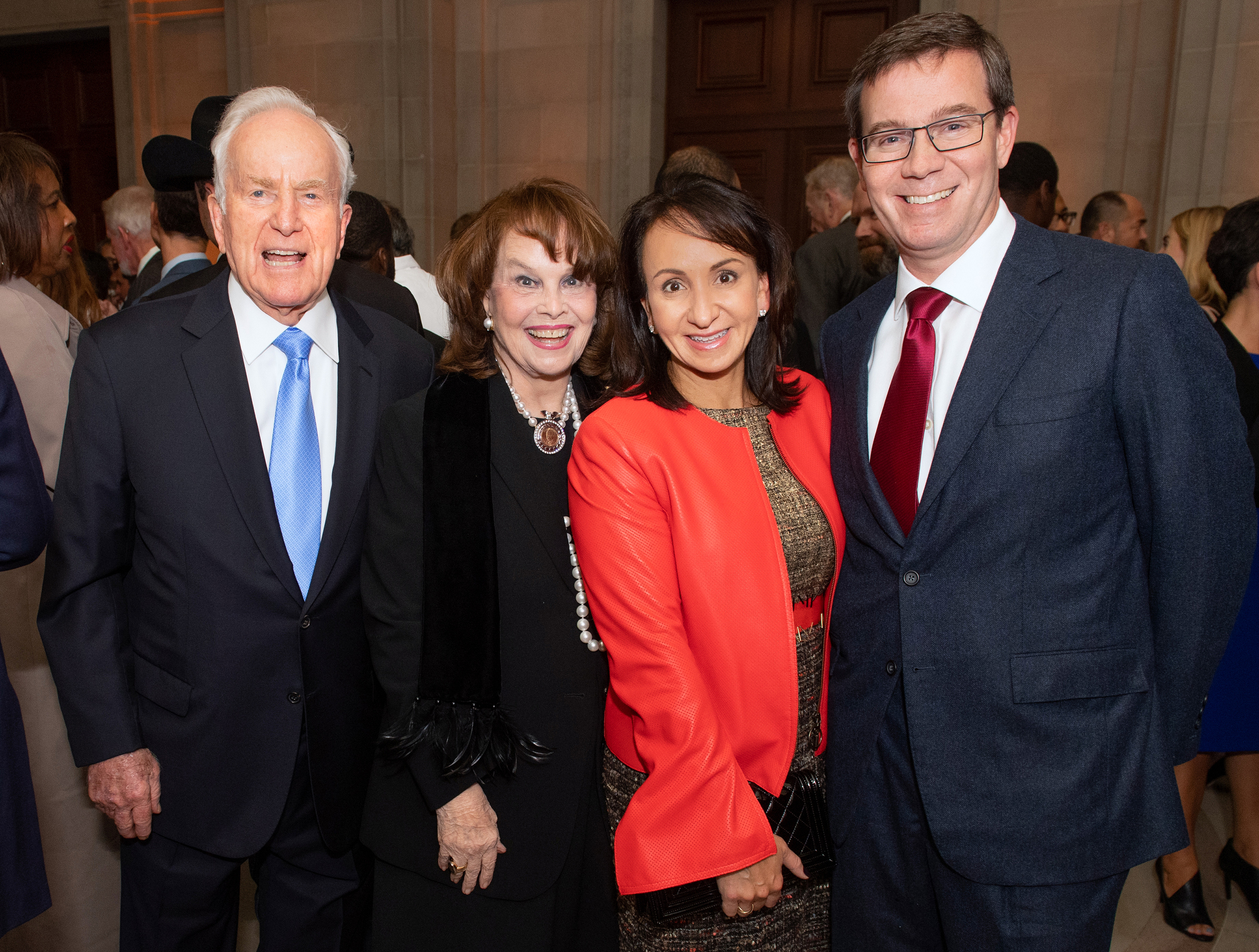
Allbritton (right) and his wife with Lloyd Nelson Hand and Ann Hand in 2019

Allbritton received his Bachelor of Arts degree from Wesleyan University in 1992, and has served as a member of its board of trustees. With his wife Elena, Allbritton donated funds for the establishment of the school's Allbritton Center for the Study of Public Life.

== Allbritton Journalism Institute and NOTUS/The Washington Sun ==
In 2023, Allbritton established the Allbritton Journalism Institute (AJI) with a $20 million grant. The institute is a nonprofit educational organization based in Washington, D.C., dedicated to training the next generation of political journalists.
