= Paul Berry (television) =

US news presenter (born 1944)

- Born: February 15, 1944 (age 82); Detroit, U.S.

Paul Berry (born February 15, 1944) is an American producer, reporter, and news anchor who covered news in Washington, D.C., and Detroit, U.S. for more than 25 years and currently hosts his own nationally syndicated weekly radio talk show.

A Detroit native, Berry has been married to Amy Berry, a realtor on the Eastern Shore of Maryland, since 1987; they live in Easton, Maryland, and have three children: Talley, Hudson and Paul.

Berry was senior anchor for WJLA-TV's 5, 6, and 11 pm newscasts in Washington, D.C. He joined WJLA in 1972 from his native city of Detroit where he spent four years as an anchor/reporter at the ABC owned outlet WXYZ-TV. Previously, Berry attended the Department of Defense Information School and served with the Armed Forces Radio and Television Service (AFRTS) assigned to the Tuy Hoa Air Force Base in Vietnam where he worked as Program Director and Sportscaster. While on assignment, Berry established the first independent FM radio station in South Vietnam.

Berry is highly regarded in the Washington area for establishing two WJLA/community service programs, "Crimesolvers" and "Seven on Your Side." Over the years, Berry has been recognized countless times for his relentless work and commitment to the community. In 1982, Berry was named the unanimous winner of the National Academy of Television Arts and Sciences Ted Yates award, given to the individual demonstrating outstanding professional and personal qualities in their contribution to Washington television news and public affairs.

Berry has been awarded nine local Emmys. Berry received the 1986 Humanitarian Award of the National Martin Luther King Jr., Student Leadership Conference in recognition of his long record of community involvement, particularly as a role model of Washington area youth. In 1989, Berry received both the Mid-Atlantic Professional Golfers' Association – Citizens Award and the Olender Foundation "Generous Heart Award." Washingtonian Magazine named Berry "Washingtonian of the Year" in 1991. He won the 1993 Capital Region Emmy Award for Outstanding News Anchor, and in 1994, Berry was voted into the National Academy of Television Arts and Sciences "Silver circle" in recognition of his 25 years of contributions to Washington Television.

Active in the community, Berry is a member of several local civic, charitable and professional organizations. He serves on the board of trustees for Ford's Theatre in addition to several Boards of Directors including The Neediest Kids, Inc., The Washington Jesuit Academy, and the Paul Berry Academic Scholarship Foundation, providing private school education for 50 academically deserving minority high school students. He is past president of the Chesapeake Chapter of the National Academy of Television Arts & Sciences and currently serves as a commissioner for Maryland Public Television.

On May 26, 1999, Paul Berry left the news desk to focus on a career in consulting and radio and hosted Washington, D.C.'s The Paul Berry show for a number of years. He currently hosts his own nationally syndicated weekly radio talk show, Home & Family Finance Radio, sponsored by the Credit Union National Association (CUNA). The show airs Sundays at 3:00 p.m. Eastern on the Radio America network.

Berry is also a licensed realtor in the state of Maryland, and runs his own media company, Paul L. Berry & Associates, LLC.
