= Gordon Peterson =

American journalist

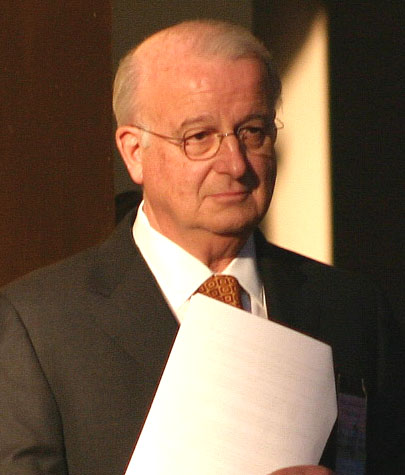
- Gordon Peterson at a 2006 Cherry Blossom Festival event
- Born: 1938 (age 86–87)
- Education: College of the Holy Cross (BA); Georgetown University
- Occupation: Journalist

Gordon Peterson (born 1938) is an American broadcast journalist and television news anchor. He was most recently the 6 p.m. co-anchor for ABC affiliate WJLA-TV and from 1988 to 2013 was also moderator and producer of Inside Washington, a political roundtable discussion about current political events in Washington. He has won multiple Emmy Awards during his broadcast career.

== Life and career ==
Peterson has worked at Washington, D.C. local news stations for most of his career. He worked for CBS-affiliated WUSA (Channel 9) as the news anchor for 35 years before switching to rival station WJLA (Channel 7) after WUSA station management decided to cut his airtime. Peterson graduated from the College of the Holy Cross and attended Georgetown University without finishing a degree program. He became news director for AM radio station WNEB in his hometown of Worcester, Massachusetts before moving to CBS's Boston affiliate, WEEI. He also served as an officer in the United States Marine Corps.

Peterson first arrived in Washington in the fall of 1969, working as a reporter for both WTOP radio and television, and within two years was named co-anchor with fellow staffer Max Robinson of The Big News, which later evolved into Eyewitness News. He would remain the main anchor at Channel 9 for 33 years amid many changes on and off-camera. For most of that period he co-anchored with Maureen Bunyan, with whom he was reunited on the 6 p.m. news on WJLA-TV in December 2004. Viewers also enjoyed Peterson's banter with sportscaster Glenn Brenner, who was the city's most popular broadcast journalist from 1977 until his death in 1992. Brenner often ribbed Peterson for his lifelong support of the also-ran Boston Red Sox major league baseball team. Brenner and Peterson became close friends, and their jokes at one another's expense became local legend.

After Martin Agronsky retired as moderator of Agronsky & Co. in 1988, Peterson became producer and moderator of the show, which was retitled Inside Washington. In early September 2013, Gordon Peterson announced that Inside Washington would cease production in late December 2013 after a continuous run of 25 years. The last new episode of Inside Washington aired in December 2013.

It was announced on November 7, 2014, that Peterson would retire from WJLA-TV when his contract was to expire at the end of the year. His last newscast with the station aired on December 31.

== See also ==
- Inside Washington
- Agronsky & Co.
- Washington Week
