= Doug Hill (meteorologist) =

American meteorologist (1950–2021)

- Born: July 29, 1950; Towson, Maryland
- Died: November 22, 2021 (aged 71); Leland, North Carolina
- Occupation(s): Television meteorologist, radio personality
- Years active: 1984–2017

Lawrence Douglas Hill (July 29, 1950 – November 22, 2021) was an American meteorologist. He was the chief meteorologist for ABC 7 News/WJLA-TV in Washington, D.C., at noon, 4, 5, and 6 from 2000 until his retirement in 2017. He was awarded the "Seal of Approval" from the American Meteorological Society. Hill was honored with a Washington Emmy Award for broadcast excellence. Hill has also served as a meteorologist for affiliates in Richmond and Detroit.

Hill graduated from Towson State College. He enlisted in the United States Air Force, serving for four years mostly at Andrews Air Force Base. After leaving the military, he served as a police officer for Prince George's County for six years.

Hill began his meteorology career in Richmond, Virginia in 1978, where he got his first break at WWBT-TV as the weekend weatherman. He then moved on to Detroit working at WXYZ for the next four and a half years until returning east to Washington, D.C., with CBS affiliate WUSA in 1984. He stayed at WUSA for 16 years until moving to WJLA. In addition to TV, he often reported live on WTOP 103.5 FM's "Weather On The 8s And When It Breaks" segments until his retirement.

He retired from WJLA-TV on September 15, 2017. He was a radio personality on WGTS 91.9 FM, a Christian radio station. He stated that he wanted to use his platform as a well-known figure in the Washington area for Christian ministry.

Hill died on November 22, 2021, at the age of 71. He was married twice, latterly to Mary Ann Vranken, and had four children, one of which predeceased him.
