= WJLA-TV =

Television station in Washington, D.C.

- Washington, D.C.; United States
- Channels: Digital: 7 (VHF); Virtual: 7
- Branding: ABC 7; 7 News On Your Side

Programming
- Affiliations: 7.1: ABC; for others, see § Subchannels

Ownership
- Owner: Sinclair Broadcast Group; (ACC Licensee, LLC)
- Sister stations: Broadcast: WDCO-CD; Cable: WJLA 24/7 News

History
- First air date: October 3, 1947
- Former call signs: WMAL-TV (1947–1977)
- Former channel numbers: Analog: 7 (VHF, 1947–2009); Digital: 39 (UHF, 1998-2009)
- Former affiliations: CBS (primary 1947–1948, secondary 1948–1949); NTA (secondary, 1956–1961)
- Call sign meaning: Joe L. Allbritton (founder of Allbritton Communications, former owner of station)

Technical information
- Licensing authority: FCC
- Facility ID: 1051
- ERP: 52 kW
- HAAT: 235.6 m (773 ft)
- Transmitter coordinates: 38°57′1″N 77°4′47″W

Links
- Public license information: Public file; LMS
- Website: wjla.com

WJLA-TV (channel 7) is a television station in Washington, D.C., affiliated with ABC. It is one of two flagship stations of Sinclair Broadcast Group (alongside dual Fox/MyNetworkTV affiliate WBFF [channel 45] in Baltimore), and is also sister to Woodstock, Virginia–licensed low-power, Class A Roar station WDCO-CD (channel 10) and local cable channel WJLA 24/7 News. WJLA-TV's studios are located on Wilson Boulevard in the Rosslyn section of Arlington, Virginia, and its transmitter is located in the Tenleytown neighborhood of northwest Washington.

== History ==
The District of Columbia's third television station began broadcasting on October 3, 1947, as WMAL-TV, owned by the Washington Star, along with WMAL radio (630 AM, now WSBN, and 107.3 FM, now WLVW). It was the first high-band VHF television station (channels 7–13) in the United States. WMAL radio had been an affiliate of the NBC Blue Network since 1933, and remained with the network after it was spun off by NBC and evolved into ABC. However, channel 7 started as a CBS station since ABC had not yet established its television network. When ABC launched on television in 1948, WMAL-TV became ABC's third primary affiliate; the station continued to carry some CBS programming until WOIC (channel 9, now WUSA) signed on in 1949. During the late 1950s, the station was also briefly affiliated with the NTA Film Network.

In 1975, Houston businessman Joe Allbritton, the owner of the now-defunct Washington-based Riggs Bank, purchased a controlling interest in the Star's media properties, which by that time also included WLVA radio and WLVA-TV in Lynchburg, Virginia; and WCIV in Charleston, South Carolina. As a condition of the purchase, Allbritton was given three years to break up the Washington newspaper/broadcast combination, which the Federal Communications Commission (FCC) was seeking to prohibit under the tightening of its concentration of media ownership policy. WMAL-TV was separated first from its radio sisters when ABC purchased WMAL radio in March 1977. As FCC regulations at the time prevented separately-owned stations from sharing the same call sign, WMAL-TV became WJLA-TV on June 6, after Allbritton's initials. In April 1977, Allbritton negotiated a deal to trade the station to Combined Communications Corporation in return for KOCO-TV in Oklahoma City, but called off the deal due to last-minute complications despite receiving FCC approval. Allbritton instead sold the Washington Star to Time Inc. in January 1978 (the paper would shut down in 1981), and retained WJLA-TV and the Lynchburg and Charleston television stations for what would eventually become Allbritton Communications.

Rumors abounded from the mid-1990s onward that ABC might buy WJLA-TV, effectively reuniting it with its former radio sisters. Indeed, in the summer of 1998, ABC's corporate parent The Walt Disney Company discussed a possible acquisition of Allbritton Communications, but a sale agreement failed to materialize. ABC eventually sold most of its radio properties, including WMAL and its FM sister station (by then WRQX), to Citadel Broadcasting Corporation in June 2007. Even so, WJLA remained an ABC affiliate under Allbritton's ownership because the company had an exclusive affiliation deal with the network. After WJZ-TV in Baltimore switched to CBS in 1995, WJLA-TV became ABC's longest-tenured television affiliate.

In August 2002, Allbritton merged News Channel 8 with WJLA-TV's news department, resulting in some staff layoffs. The unified entity moved into an office complex in the Rosslyn section of Arlington. News Channel 8 was originally based in Springfield, Virginia.

As of July 2008, WJLA-TV had an independent weather channel, Weather Now, under meteorologist Doug Hill. Until July 28, 2008, WJLA-TV offered Local Point TV on 7.2 featuring five-minute video segments created by area residents. Abby Fenton, the station's Director of Community Relations said in an interview with Broadcasting & Cable media industry magazine that "the station likes the 'Local Point' programming and is pondering where else it might fit". Retro Television Network ("Retro TV") replaced Local Point TV.

In late October 2008, WJLA-TV began simulcasting on local low-powered station WWTD-LP; the station continued to broadcast an analog feed of WJLA-TV after the digital transition. In late July 2009, WJLA-TV dropped its locally produced "WeatherNow" channel for The Local AccuWeather Channel on its second subchannel under the "Doug Hill's WeatherNow" brand. On March 13, 2012, WJLA-TV dropped the Local AccuWeather Channel in favor of forecasts from their own meteorologists. With that, the name of the channel was slightly changed to "ABC7's WeatherNow".

On May 1, 2012, WJLA-TV announced it would add the Disney/ABC-owned Live Well Network to digital subchannel 7.3 on July 1, 2012, replacing RTV. WJLA-TV began carrying MeTV, a competing classic digital broadcast TV network on March 1, 2013, on WJLA-TV's second subchannel, replacing WeatherNow.

=== Sinclair ownership ===
On May 1, 2013, reports surfaced that Allbritton was planning to sell its television stations so it could put more of its focus on running its political website Politico. Allbritton announced nearly three months later that it would sell all of its stations to Sinclair Broadcast Group for $985 million. After nearly a year of delays, the deal was approved by the FCC on July 24, 2014. The deal was finalized on August 1, 2014.

The station's second digital subchannel was an initial but secondary affiliate of the American Sports Network with its first broadcast on August 30, 2014. The station switched its subchannels over to Sinclair's owned digital networks, Charge! on .2, Comet on .3 and TBD on .4. WJLA-TV rebranded NewsChannel 8 as WJLA 24/7 News on Tuesday July 24, aligning it further with the call letters of its broadcast station, WJLA-TV.

== Logos and imaging ==
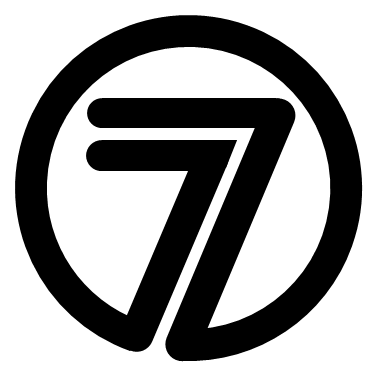
First version of WJLA's Circle 7 logo used from 1975 to 1984; updated version was used from 1984 to 2001.

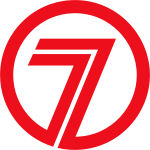
Red variant of WJLA's updated Circle 7 logo; Seven Network in Australia used a logo identical to that of WJLA-TV from 1989 to 1999.

Since 1970, WMAL-TV/WJLA-TV has used a variation of the Circle 7 logo, which has long been primarily associated with ABC affiliates located on Channel 7. From 1970 to 2001, WMAL-TV/WJLA-TV used its own version of the logo, with the "7" modified to accommodate the circle. In 1984, it saw a minor update with rounded ends on the "7" being modified to use sharp, straight edges, like the logo later used by Australia's Seven Network. This version of the logo was probably the longest continuously used numeric logo in Washington's television history. The only real modification came in 1998, after it began calling itself "ABC 7" on-air and added the ABC logo to the left side. In 2001, WJLA-TV adopted the standard version of the "Circle 7" logo, refueling speculation that ABC would purchase the station, a deal that would never come to pass. WJLA-TV is the largest ABC affiliate to use the Circle 7 that is not an ABC owned-and-operated station. In addition, sister station KATV in Little Rock, Arkansas, has used the standard Circle 7 since the 1960s, longer than all WJLA-TV versions combined.

== Programming ==
=== Sports programming ===
Beginning in September 1984, WJLA-TV became the Washington-area affiliate for Atlantic Coast Conference football and men's basketball along a syndicated network that was operated by Jefferson-Pilot Communications and eventually jointly produced with Raycom Sports. These games later moved to WDCA (channel 20).

In the 2014 season, WJLA-TV began to air additional college football games through Sinclair's American Sports Network.

In 2015, D.C. United of Major League Soccer reached a new multi-year deal with Sinclair Broadcast Group to broadcast all of the team's regionally televised matches on WJLA-TV and NewsChannel 8 (now WJLA 24/7 News), succeeding CSN Mid-Atlantic. Television coverage of United games moved back to NBC Sports Washington in 2021, and stayed there until all MLS live coverage went to MLS Season Pass in 2023.

In 2002, as part of ABC's NBA coverage, selected Washington Wizards games began airing on WJLA, succeeding WRC-TV. WJLA-TV aired select regular season and postseason Washington Capitals games from 2000 until 2004 and has aired selected Stanley Cup Playoff games of the Capitals since 2022.

=== News operation ===
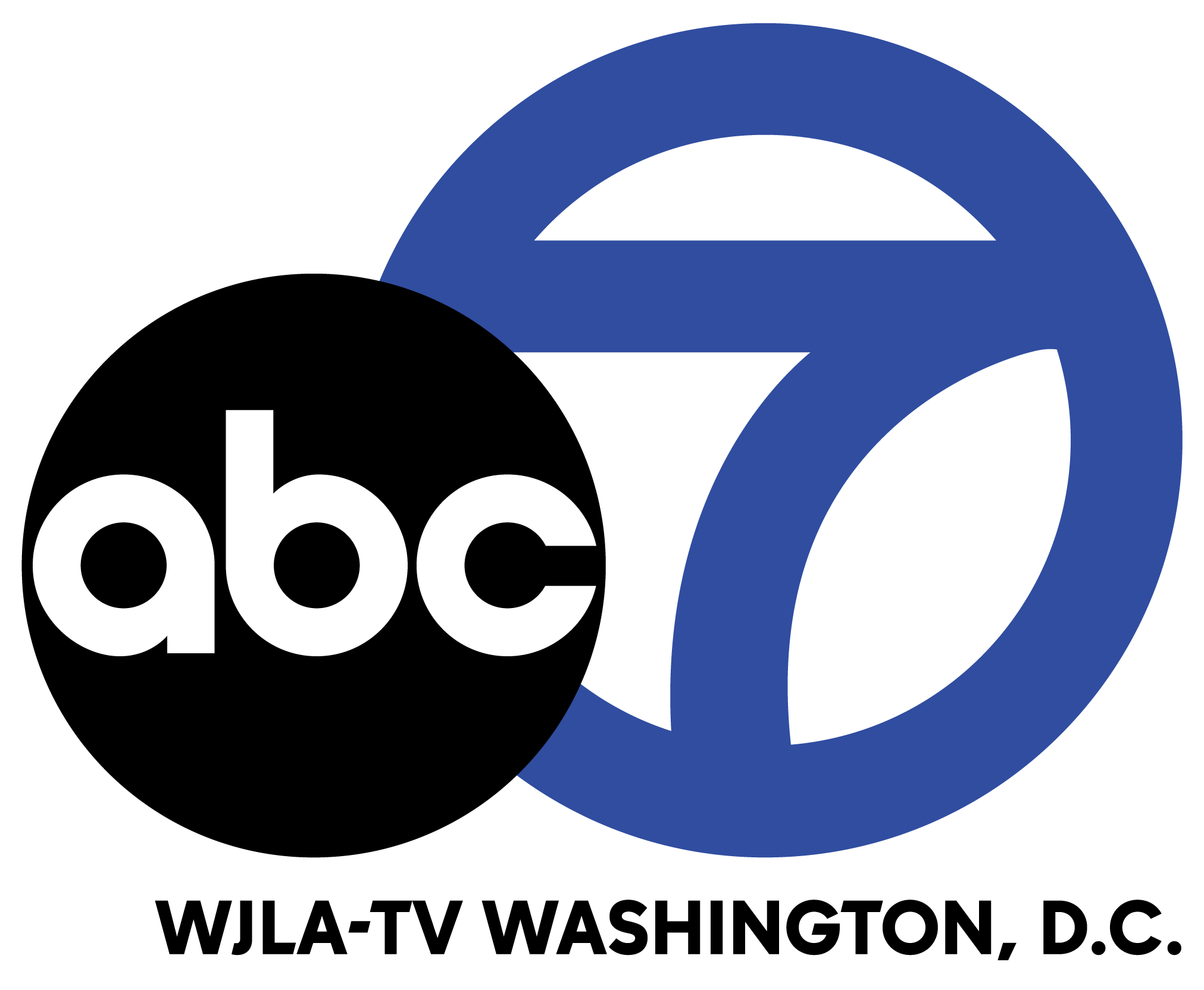
WJLA alternative logo

WJLA-TV presently broadcasts a total of 42 1/2 hours of locally produced newscasts each week (with 7 hours, 35 minutes each weekday; 2 hours, 5 minutes on Saturdays; and 2 1/2 hours on Sundays). The station has the largest news team in the Washington area, which includes around 40 on-air staff members. As the flagship station of the Allbritton Communications station group, WJLA-TV provided all news reports for the Allbritton station group via its news-gathering service.

Prior to 2001, WJLA-TV's newscasts had long placed third in the market's news ratings, behind WUSA and NBC-owned WRC-TV. The station hired Maureen Bunyan, former longtime anchor at WUSA, and in 2003, former CNN anchor Leon Harris joined the station as an anchor. In 2004, WJLA-TV hired Bunyan's former anchor desk partner, Gordon Peterson; and reunited the two as anchors for the 6 p.m. newscast. These personnel moves, combined with WUSA's recent ratings troubles, led to a resurgence in the ratings. In the May 2010 sweeps, it placed number one at 5 p.m. in total viewers, and in the 25–54 demo.

WJLA-TV became the second television station in the Washington, D.C. market (behind WUSA) to begin broadcasting its local newscasts in high definition on December 8, 2008. The upgrade included the introduction of a new on-air graphics package as well as minor changes made to the news desk for better viewing quality with high definition. Field reports and promotions for WJLA-TV's newscasts continued to be broadcast in standard definition until the end of March 2013, when the station upgraded to HD field cameras for field shots and some news promotions.

On January 23, 2009, WJLA-TV laid off 26 staff members, including several on-air reporters, due to financial constraints. The laid off reporters included Andrea McCarren, Sarah C. Lee, Alisa Parenti, Emily Schmidt, Jennifer Donelan, and weekend sports anchor Greg Toland. Most of the dismissals took effect immediately, but some were allowed to serve out their contracts. WJLA-TV also announced a 4.9% salary cut for all remaining staff and a halt to company contributions to 401(k) retirement plans.

Post-acquisition, concerns began to emerge surrounding how Sinclair's historic right-wing slant may affect WJLA-TV's news coverage. After Sinclair took over the station, WJLA-TV began to air conservative commentaries by Sinclair executive Mark E. Hyman, along with stories from Sinclair's Washington bureau—all of which were critical of the Obama administration. The station also partnered with the conservative Washington Times to feature its weekly "Golden Hammer" award—highlighting "the most egregious examples of government waste, fraud and abuse", as a segment during its newscasts. WJLA-TV staff members felt that it was inappropriate for a station in Washington, D.C. to air stories that are critical of the federal government; one employee told The Washington Post that with these changes, the station may "lose the trust they built up with people over years and years. We've told people, 'We're just like you,' not, 'We're looking out for the tea party.'"

WJLA-TV started producing the syndicated news program for Sinclair stations, The National Desk, on January 18, 2021. Locally, the program airs on WJLA 24/7 News, which is available over-the-air on WIAV-CD 58.2.

==== Notable current on-air staff ====
- Lisa Fletcher – investigative reporter
- Veronica Johnson – lead meteorologist

==== Notable former on-air staff ====
- Paul Berry
- Tim Brant
- Pamela Brown
- Maureen Bunyan
- Nancy Chen
- Carol Costello
- Charles Gibson
- Kendis Gibson
- Mike Hambrick
- Leon Harris
- Frank Herzog
- Doug Hill (AMS seal of approval) – chief meteorologist
- Megyn Kelly
- Kevin Kiley
- Susan King
- Kathleen Matthews
- Andrea McCarren
- Britt McHenry
- Doug McKelway
- Mike Patrick
- Gordon Peterson
- Renee Poussaint
- Bob Ryan – meteorologist
- David Schoumacher
- Alison Starling – anchor
- Lori Stokes
- Joe Witte

== Technical information ==
=== Subchannels ===
The station's signal is multiplexed:

Subchannels of WJLA-TV
Subchannel	Res.	Short name	Programming
7.1	720p	WJLA	ABC
7.2	480i	Charge!	Charge!
7.3	480i	Comet	Comet
7.4	480i	ROAR	Roar
32.1	1080i	WHUT	PBS (WHUT-TV)
32.2	480i	PBSKids	PBS Kids (WHUT-TV)

Broadcast on behalf of another station

=== Analog-to-digital conversion ===
WJLA-TV shut down its analog signal, over VHF channel 7, on June 12, 2009, the official date on which full-power television stations in the United States transitioned from analog to digital broadcasts under federal mandate. The station's digital signal relocated from its pre-transition UHF channel 39 to VHF channel 7 for post-transition operations. While 90% of the station's viewers received WJLA-TV's signal via cable or satellite, many of the over-the-air viewers had problems after the final transition. Some needed to rescan, and others needed a VHF antenna. WJLA-TV applied on August 29, 2009, for special authorization by the FCC to increase its effective radiated power (ERP) to 52 kW. The power increase was put into effect on September 18, 2009. WJLA-TV already ran 30 kW of ERP, which was higher than the other three VHF stations in the area: WUSA (12.6 kW), WBAL-TV (5 kW), and WJZ-TV (28.8 kW) (post transition power levels).
