= WJLA 24/7 News =

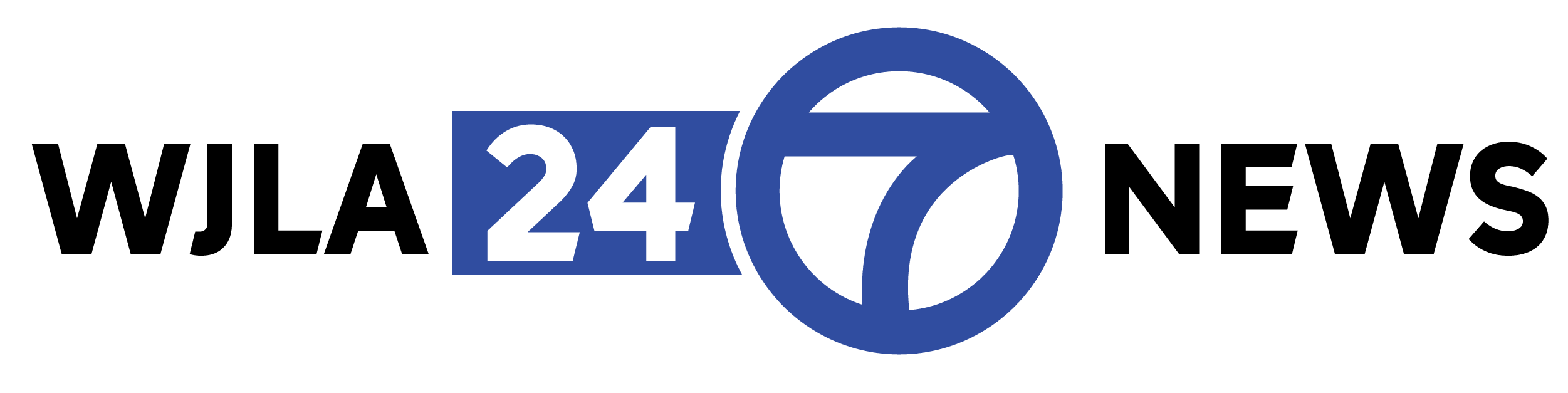
- Country: United States
- Broadcast area: Washington, D.C.; northern Virginia; northern Shenandoah Valley; suburban Maryland; Worldwide
- Headquarters: Arlington, Virginia

Programming
- Language: English
- Picture format: 1080p (HDTV via ATSC 3.0); 720p (HDTV); 480i (SDTV)

Ownership
- Owner: Sinclair Broadcast Group

History
- Launched: October 7, 1991
- Former names: NewsChannel 8 (1991–2010, 2011–2018); TBD TV (2010–2011)

Links
- Website: wjla.com

Availability

Terrestrial
- ATSC 3.0 Digital television (Washington D.C.): Channel 58.4 (WIAV-CD)

WJLA 24/7 News is an American regional cable news television channel in Washington, D.C., operated by ABC-affiliated station WJLA-TV (channel 7) owned by the Sinclair Broadcast Group. The channel provides 24-hour news coverage primarily focused on Washington, northern Virginia, and suburban areas of Maryland within the Washington metropolitan area. The channel shares studio facilities and offices with WJLA-TV and the Rosslyn-based Circa News in Arlington, Virginia. WJLA 24/7 News reaches more than 1.2 million cable television households within the D.C metropolitan area.

== History ==
The channel was launched on October 7, 1991, as NewsChannel 8. The "8" branding was selected as a part of the name to attempt to get Washington-area cable providers to place the channel between its parent ABC-affiliated station, WJLA-TV (at channel 7), and local CBS affiliate WUSA-TV on channel 9. Allbritton also bundled the channel along with WJLA in carriage contracts. In 1995, the channel began airing timeshifted ABC News programs hours or days after their original broadcast.

NewsChannel 8 initially only had ad revenue stream until federal regulations required cable operators to pay for its carriage. In 1997, the channel was reported as profitable and started a streak of profitability by Allbritton.

As NewsChannel 8's carriage expanded to those areas, coverage was expanded to include Southern Maryland and Prince William County governmental meetings by the end of the 1990s. In July 2001, NewsChannel 8 beat CNN, Headline News, MSNBC and CNBC in the ratings, the highest viewership that the channel had ever accrued in its first 10 years. In August 2001, Comcast agreed to carry the channel for another 10 years. In August 2002, Allbritton Communications merged NewsChannel 8 and WJLA-TV with NewsChannel 8 laying off 30 of its 125 staff. The channel in Springfield and station in Northwest Washington moved to a Rosslyn section twin towers office complex in Arlington, Gannett Co. and USA Today's former home.

Former logo as NewsChannel 8, used from October 7, 1991, to August 9, 2010, and from February 1, 2011, to July 24, 2018.

On September 5, 2006, Comcast moved NewsChannel 8, at the channel's request, to channel 28 on the analog tiers of some of its systems, placing it next to sister station WJLA-TV on channel 27 (Comcast's systems in the immediate Washington, D.C., area slot the market's broadcast stations in the 20-29 channel range; this is an artifact from when television stations broadcast in analog prior to the 2009 digital television transition in order to avert co-channel interference with the broadcast signals).

Systems outside of Washington proper carry it on channel 8, next to WJLA on channel 7. In all cases, however, the channel's high definition feed is carried on digital channel 808. On July 17, 2013, satellite provider DirecTV began carrying NewsChannel 8 on channel 8 within the Washington market. On December 21, 2015, the channel was added to satellite provider Dish Network's D.C.-area broadcast lineup, also on channel 8.

On August 9, 2010, the channel was rebranded as TBD TV, in order to associate it with the recently established news website TBD.com, which provided news content for both the channel and WJLA. Allbritton subsequently reverted its news channel's branding to the original NewsChannel 8 name in February 2011.

On July 29, 2013, Allbritton Communications announced that it would sell its entire television group, including NewsChannel 8 and WJLA-TV, to Hunt Valley-based Sinclair Broadcast Group (owners of flagship station WBFF, as well as operators of two other stations in the adjacent Baltimore market). Sinclair had indicated that it may use NewsChannel 8 as a base to launch a national cable news channel.

On July 23, 2018, WJLA announced that NewsChannel 8 will be rebranded as WJLA 24/7 News on Tuesday July 24, aligning it further with the call letters of its broadcast station, WJLA-TV.

On March 25, 2021, Sinclair launched ATSC 3.0 operations on WIAV-CD and for the first time, made the channel available over the air via the station.

== Programming ==
Despite having "24/7" on the channel's name, WJLA 24/7 News actually provides local and national news programming on weekdays from 5:00 a.m. to 1:00 a.m., Saturdays from 6:30 a.m. to 2:00 a.m. and Sundays from 7:00 a.m. to 1:30 a.m. The remaining hours are occupied by infomercials.

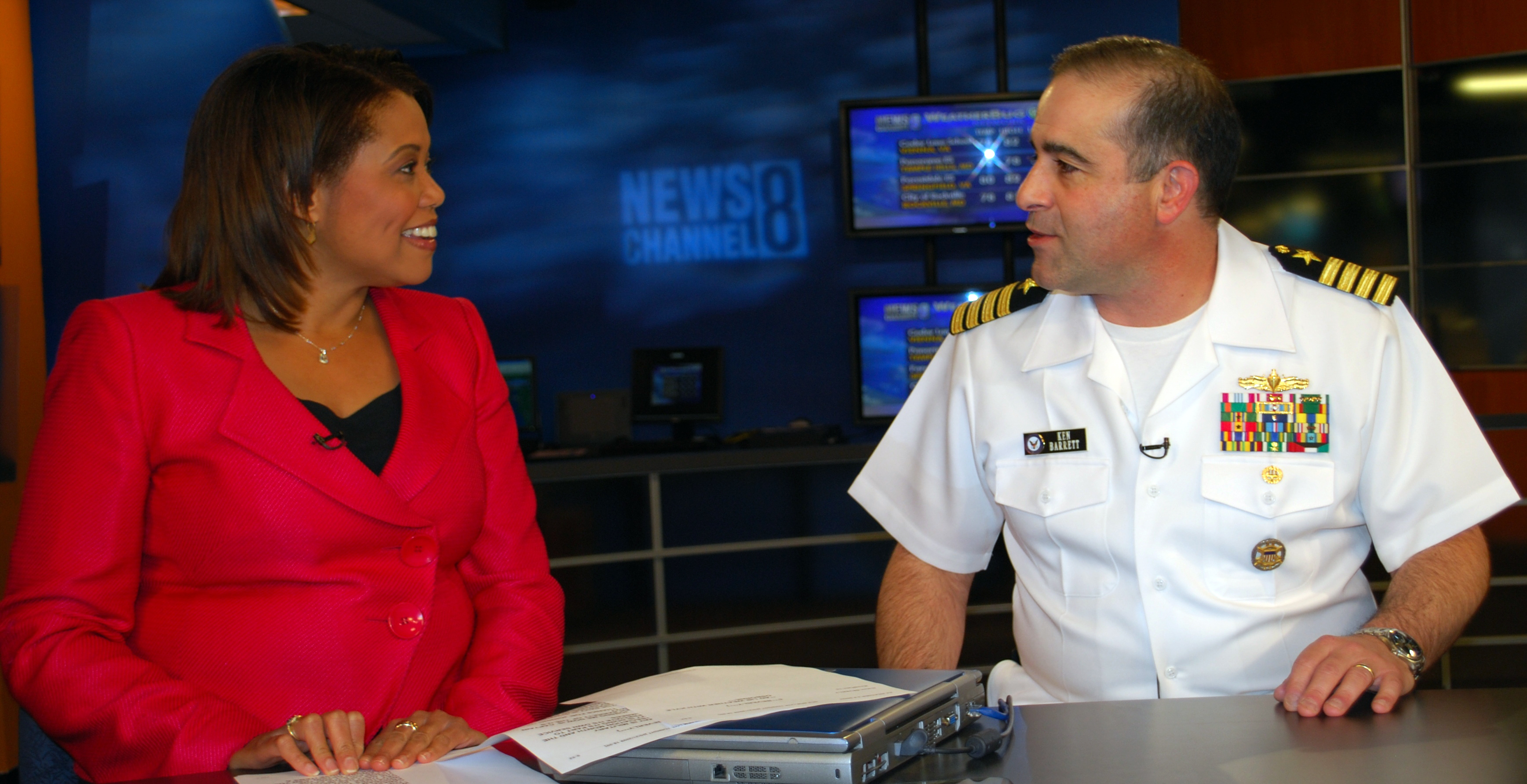
The NewsChannel 8 studio with its logo in background

Through a fiber optic delivery system, WJLA 24/7 News (as NewsChannel 8) provided programming and advertising targeted at three separate geographical regions of the Washington metropolitan area and was once known for airing specific "Zone Reports" on weeknights to these regions, including "The Washington Report" (featuring news stories affecting the District of Columbia), "The Virginia Report" (featuring news stories from northern Virginia) and "The Maryland Report" (featuring news from communities in adjacent suburban areas of Maryland). The appropriate edition was fed to each of the cable systems in the region. The newscasts were all the same, except for the second segment (aired between the first and second commercial breaks), which was specifically tailored to each "zone." The channel ended this practice in 2009.

WJLA 24/7 News employs its own anchors and certain meteorologists while sharing reporting and weather staffers with WJLA-TV. The two news operations share the same on-air news staffers for the weekend evening newscasts aired respectively by the cable channel and television station. The channel (along with its sister broadcast station) operates a bureau in Washington, D.C.

When it is not airing newscasts, WJLA 24/7 News airs encore presentations of ABC News programs as well as various local programs, including Government Matters (a news show geared towards federal government employees and contractors and the "business of government"), and SportsTalk (a sports discussion program).

Previous talk shows included Moms Talk (a Monday morning advice show hosted by two housewives), the Wednesday movie review Entertainment Forecast show, NewsTalk (a live hour-long daily call-in show featuring prominent newsmakers), Capital Insider (a political discussion program), Goss' Garage (a Saturday morning automotive program), The Arch Campbell Show (an entertainment news program) and Capital Golf Weekly (a program featuring golf instruction and feature reports on the sport).

In 2015, D.C. United of Major League Soccer reached a new multi-year deal with Sinclair Broadcast Group to broadcast all 26 of the team's regional matches on then NewsChannel 8 and WJLA, succeeding CSN Mid-Atlantic.

== Notable on-air staff ==
=== Notable former on-air staff ===
- Lisa Fletcher – anchor/reporter (was at Al Jazeera America, host of The Stream until the network's closure on April 12, 2016; returned to WJLA/NewsChannel 8 later that same year)
- Morris Jones – anchor/reporter (left network in May 2016)
- Britt McHenry – sports anchor/reporter (was at ESPN until April 26, 2017)
- Joe Witte – meteorologist (now a researcher at the Goddard Space Flight Center)
