= Edwin M. Stanton School =

Edwin M. Stanton School may refer to:

- Edwin M. Stanton School (Jacksonville), National Register of Historic Places listings in Duval County, Florida
- Edwin M. Stanton School (Philadelphia), National Register of Historic Places listings in Philadelphia County, Pennsylvania

== See also ==
- Stanton College Preparatory School, modern successor to Jacksonville's Edwin M. Stanton School
