= Aaron Gilchrist =

American television journalist

- Education: Virginia Commonwealth University
- Employer: NBC News
- Awards: Two Emmy Awards

Aaron Gilchrist is an American journalist, anchor, and correspondent currently working at NBC News and NBC News Now. He was known for working at the NBC owned and operated station WRC for 10 years as a co-anchor and fill-in anchor on MSNBC.

== Early life and education ==
Gilchrist graduated from high school in Richmond, Virginia. He then graduated in 2003 from Virginia Commonwealth University where he earned a Bachelor of Arts degree in mass communications.

== Career ==
In 1999, Gilchrist began his career as a desk assistant at WWBT while working on his degree, and became a news anchor and reporter in 2004. He left in 2010.

In 2010, he joined WRC, NBC's owned and operated station in Washington, D.C. as a general assignment reporter and weekend news anchor. In 2012 he was promoted to morning news anchor and co-anchored with Eun Yang for eight years. He also filled in as an anchor on MSNBC.

Gilchrist announced in 2020 that he was leaving WRC-TV after nearly 11 years, to be a correspondent and anchor at NBC News and NBC News Now in New York. A month later he was promoted at NBC News and its streaming service to correspondent and anchor. In March 2021, he became an anchor of streaming service NBC News Now, which expanded to a two-hour weekday block covering national and international news. In 2022 he became co-anchor on NBC News Now with Kate Snow, and co-anchored the streaming channel's afternoon news show NBC News Daily.

He was then replaced as co-anchor by Zinhle Essamuah in 2023, and has since been a correspondent and fill-in anchor on NBC News.

== Awards ==
During his tenure at NBC4, he received two Emmy awards.
