= Jim Vance =

Television news presenter

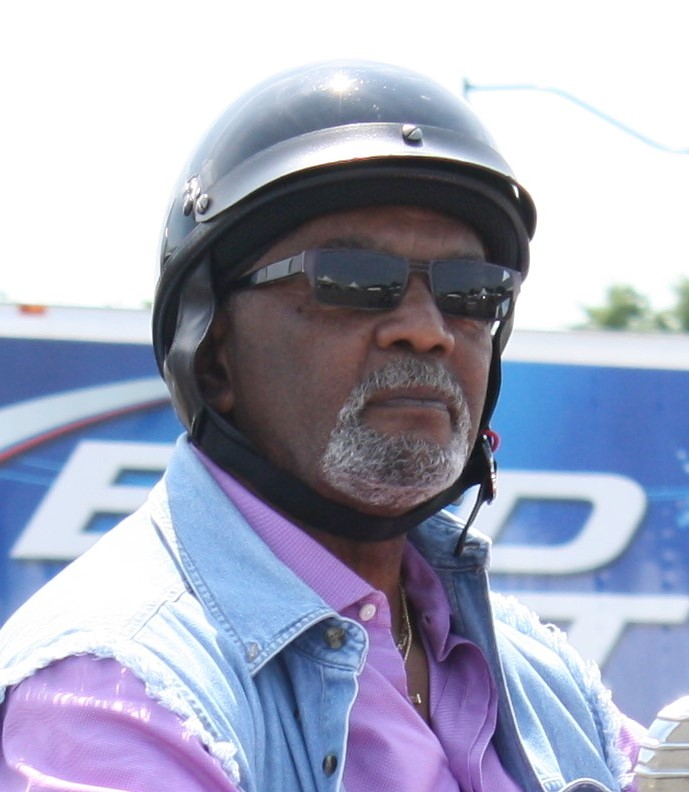
- Vance in 2011
- Born: James Howard Vance III; January 10, 1942; Ardmore, Pennsylvania, U.S.
- Died: July 22, 2017 (aged 75); Washington, D.C., U.S.
- Education: Cheyney University
- Occupations: Television news anchor (1969–2017)
- Spouse: Kathy McCampbell Vance
- Children: 3

James Howard Vance III (January 10, 1942 – July 22, 2017) was an American television news presenter in Washington, D.C.

== Early life ==
Born on January 10, 1942, Jim Vance grew up in Ardmore, Pennsylvania, a suburb west of Philadelphia. His father, James Vance Jr., was a veteran of World War II. who died from cirrhosis of the liver when Vance was nine years old. "When my old man died, I was convinced that it was my fault. I was convinced I was such a piece of shit that he'd rather die than hang out with me," Jim Vance later said. His grandparents and family raised him while his mother, Eleanor, lived and worked in Philadelphia. Vance felt his mother had abandoned him, fueling decades of resentment, and in later years, forgiveness.

As a teenager, Vance wanted to be a plumber like his grandfather, but his family encouraged him to attend college. Vance attended Lower Merion High School in Ardmore and earned a Bachelor of Science degree in secondary education from Cheyney University, a historically black university in Cheyney, Pennsylvania. It was at Cheyney where Vance became a lifelong member of Kappa Alpha Psi fraternity and built a life-long friendship with Ed Bradley.

== Career ==
Vance began his news career as a reporter for the Philadelphia Independent newspaper and WHAT-AM radio station, while simultaneously teaching English at Overbrook High School. A friend mentioned that WKBS-TV was searching for someone for their newly started news operation. Vance auditioned and realized that perhaps he was working in the wrong profession. Vance worked as a reporter for WKBS-TV for one year and was later hired by NBC News to report for the network's affiliate Washington, D.C. station, WRC-TV in 1969.

From 1972 to 1976 Vance was main co-anchor with Glenn Rinker, becoming one of the first African Americans in that position in the United States. His unapologetic presence reportedly elicited racist hate mail and threats. Between 1976 and 1980, Vance co-anchored with Sue Simmons, a pairing that resulted in one of the first, if not the first, African-American co-anchors of a major market newscast.

Beginning in 1989, Vance was part of the longest-running anchor team in Washington D.C. television, alongside co-anchor and health reporter Doreen Gentzler. Vance's 11 pm newscasts with Gentzler regularly drew more viewers than the prime-time shows of the three major cable news networks combined (CNN, Fox and MSNBC). Vance and sports anchor George Michael became internet sensations after laughing at a model who fell twice on a runway, resulting in millions of views. Vance appeared as himself in the 2009 movie State of Play and appeared as himself in a 2010 episode of the NBC series The Event and in a 2013 edition of NBC series The Blacklist. Vance earned 19 Emmy Awards, one of which was for his coverage of the 1977 Hanafi Siege of three buildings in downtown Washington, D.C. He also won an Emmy for his coverage of the January 1982 crash of Air Florida Flight 90 in the Potomac River that killed 78 people and a Metrorail train derailment the same day, which killed three people. Vance was also recognized as anchor and reporter for extended news coverage of Super Bowl XXII.

Vance also received multiple Emmy Awards for Outstanding News Anchor in 1987, 1991, 1997, 1999, and 2011. He also received a 1999 award as producer and reporter for WRC-TV's News4 at 6 broadcast. In 2014, Jim Vance received the Board of Governor's Award for outstanding achievement and community service.

Vance was inducted into the National Association of Black Journalists Hall of Fame on August 10, 2007, and was named "Washingtonian of the Year" by Washingtonian magazine in 1976 among many other awards for community service.

== Personal life ==
Vance lived in Silver Spring, Maryland. When he was 19 years old he married Margo L. Vance and they had one daughter, Dawn. Margo died in 2014. He subsequently married Barbara Schmidt-Vance and raised his second daughter Amani (b. 1970). In 1987 he married his third wife, Kathy McCampbell Vance, a television producer and former WRC-TV executive. He had one stepson (Brendon b. 1976), two grandsons, and one granddaughter.

Vance battled a cocaine addiction in the late 1970s and early 1980s, later going public with the ordeal. Vance checked into the Betty Ford Center in 1984. One night in 1987, Vance sat on the ground by the Potomac River at Great Falls, stuck his bird-hunting shotgun in his mouth, and considered pulling the trigger. Vance stopped, lowered the shotgun, and cried. College friend Ed Bradley encouraged him to seek therapy and Vance went for help at a dingy downtown support group "full of old-school drunks" the next day. In 2014, Vance spoke about his mother's verbal abuse of him as a child and advocated against that form of discipline.

== Death ==
In May 2017, Vance revealed he was battling lung cancer, but would continue working through treatment. Vance died in his sleep on July 22, 2017, at the age of 75. At the time of his death, Vance was the region's longest-serving television news anchor, with more than 45 years at WRC-TV.
