= Leon Harris =

American journalist and newscaster (born 1961)

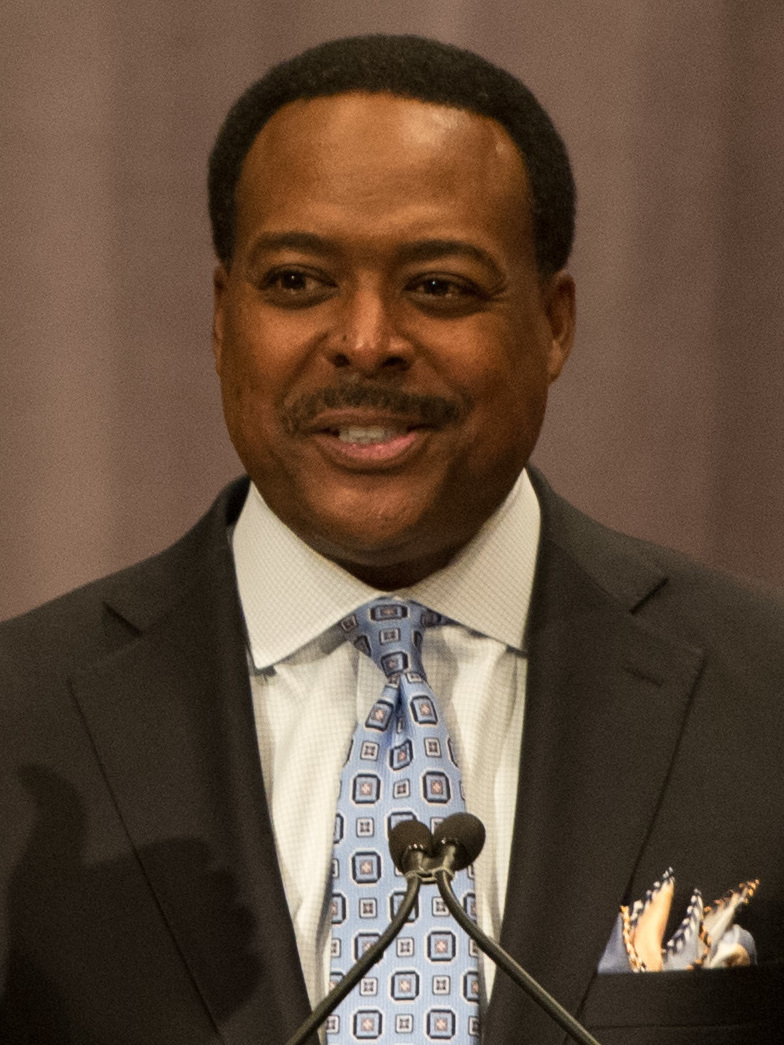
- Harris in 2014
- Born: April 20, 1961 (age 65); Akron, Ohio, United States
- Occupations: Journalist and newscaster

Leon Harris (born April 20, 1961) is an American journalist and newscaster, most recently with NBC owned-and-operated WRC-TV in Washington, D.C. Harris formerly anchored at CNN headquarters in Atlanta, and at Washington, D.C. ABC affiliate WJLA-TV.

== Early life and education ==
Harris graduated from Buchtel High School in 1979, and earned a National Merit Scholarship to Ohio University, where he met his wife, Dawn Lomax, whose family is also from Akron. Harris graduated cum laude from Ohio University in 1983, majoring in communications. He received an honorary Doctorate from the university in 1999.

== Career ==
Harris started his career at CNN's world headquarters in Atlanta in the early 1980s as an unpaid intern while completing his degree. Following graduation in 1983, Harris started as an entry-level video journalist and later moved up to assistant director of the satellite department as an operator and coordinator. In that position, he oversaw and negotiated international and domestic satellite services used to cover new events, including the Persian Gulf War and President Ronald Reagan and President George H. W. Bush's international trips and summits.

Harris auditioned for an anchor position during summer 1991; a few months later he was given a full-time anchor post. Harris received numerous awards at CNN, including several Emmy Awards for his coverage of the 2000 presidential election, the Oklahoma City bombing and the September 11th attacks. However, as competition increased from Fox News, and CNN veterans such as Natalie Allen and Lou Waters were pink-slipped in favor of Paula Zahn and Aaron Brown, Harris felt less comfortable. His last position held at CNN was co-anchor of CNN Live Today with Daryn Kagan.

In July 2003, Harris signed a deal with the Washington, D.C. ABC affiliate WJLA-TV to anchor that station's 5 o'clock and 11 o'clock newscasts. He started his new post on October 28. In 2006, Harris received the 2006 local Emmy award for Best Anchor. On September 2, 2016, WJLA declined to renew his contract and his tenure at the station ended in October of that year.

In 2013, Harris was profiled for surviving two brushes with death, due to necrotizing pancreatitis.

In April 2017, NBC owned-and-operated station WRC-TV in Washington, D.C. announced that Leon Harris would join its news team on April 21. He co-anchored News 4 at 4 alongside Eun Yang and reported for News 4 at 11.

In December 2024, NBC4 Washington announced that Harris was taking a medical leave of absence following two nights of broadcast during which he appeared unwell. In a statement, the station noted, "Last week, Leon appeared unwell while anchoring News4 at 6. Leon will be stepping away from the anchor desk to focus on health issues." The announcement followed public attention and reports highlighting Harris's challenges with speech during the November 28 broadcast.

On April 8, 2025, NBC4 Washington announced that Harris would leave the station. He was quoted as saying, "Many of you have kindly asked about me over the past few months. As you know, I took time off to focus on my health and family. After 40+ years of nonstop work and the dramatic changes in the news and television industry, I've made the difficult decision to step away from my role at NBC4. I'm grateful to NBC4 for having me as part of their team for the last eight years. This is the right time to prioritize my health and family. A special thanks to my amazing colleagues, friends, and especially to our viewers who welcomed me into their homes. It's been an honor. Thank you."

== Personal life ==
Harris was born to Leon Sr. and Lorrene Harris in Akron, Ohio. He has three brothers: Marcus, Jerry, and James who still reside in Akron; and a sister, Kimberly, who lives in Houston.

Harris currently lives in Avenel, Potomac, Maryland, with his wife Dawn, a nurse at a local hospital. Leon's son Darren (a graduate of Bucknell University) lives in Seattle, WA while his daughter Lauren (a graduate of Temple University) is an early childhood educator who lives in Atlanta, GA.

In 2013, Harris was charged with driving under the influence in Montgomery County, Maryland, to which he pleaded guilty. He received probation before judgment and served six months' probation, ending in September 2014.

On January 29, 2022, Harris was arrested and charged with driving under the influence following a crash in Montgomery County. He was off the air for over a month amid an investigation, before returning in mid-March. In June 2022, he was sentenced to one year in jail, with all but ten days suspended; three years of supervised probation; and the use of an interlock device on his vehicle.
