= Gentzler =

Gentzler is a surname. Notable people with the surname include:

- Doreen Gentzler (born 1957), American television news anchor
- Edwin Gentzler (born 1951), American literary scholar and translator
