= Christian Street Historic District =

Philadelphia, Pennsylvania, neighborhood

- Neighborhood of Philadelphia
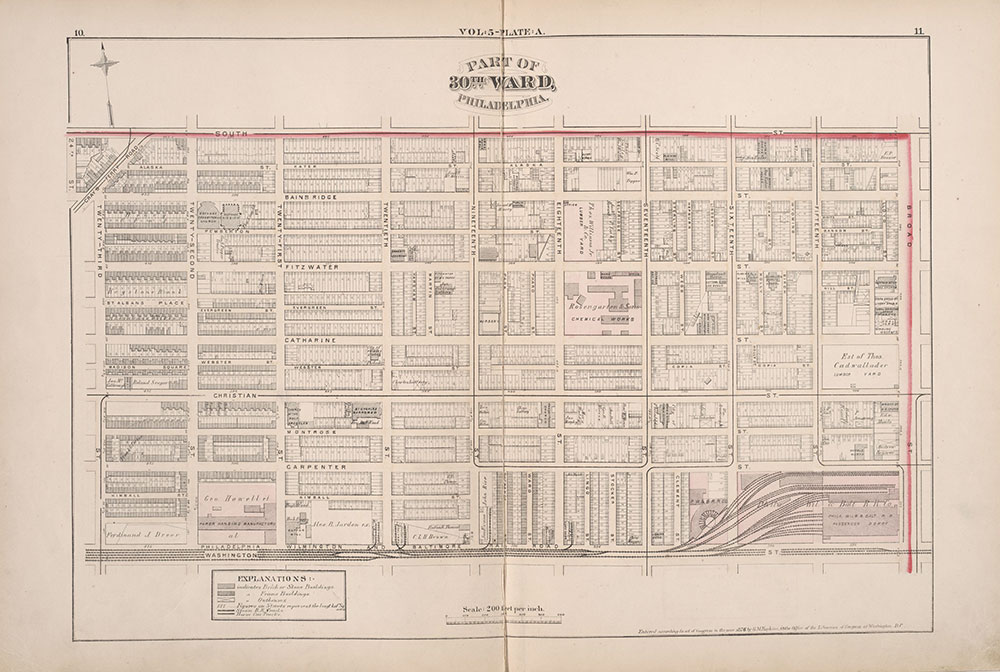
- Street plan of the Christian Street Historic District as it was in 1876
- Nickname: Black Doctors' Row
- Location within Philadelphia
- Coordinates: 39°56′26″N 75°10′16″W
- Country: United States
- State: Pennsylvania
- County: Philadelphia County
- City: Philadelphia
- Zip code: 19146
- Area codes: 215, 267 and 445

The Christian Street Historic District is an historic district located along Christian Street in Philadelphia, Pennsylvania, United States. It is also known as Black Doctors' Row. The narrow district extends approximately six city blocks, from the 1400 block of Christian Street to the intersection of Christian Street with 20th Street. Its width is one block on either side of Christian Street, extending to Montrose Street and Webster Street. It is within the area known as South Philadelphia and the neighborhood known as Graduate Hospital.

As of 2021, the district included approximately 192 buildings, some of which themselves have historical significance. The district was originally proposed for permanent preservation in 2021.

The district was at its heyday in the early 20th century when it was a center for homes, businesses, and cultural institutions of African-Americans, with many of its black residents among the city's most prominent. The district was at that time termed "Main Street for Philadelphia's Black Elite."

The neighborhood was officially designated as an historic district by unanimous vote of the Philadelphia Historical Commission in July 2022.

== Historical significance ==
Development of the Christian Street Neighborhood began in earnest in approximately 1866 as it became incorporated into the city of Philadelphia. Initially the neighborhood was Irish-Catholic in ethnicity. During the nineteenth century, the district was often known as St. Charles Parish, because of the location of St. Charles Borromeo Roman Catholic Church at the edge of the district. It also included several Protestant churches, especially Presbyterian, and the district was middle class.

Christian Street is somewhat wider than most streets in South Philadelphia, as are the sidewalks. Accordingly, the contractors who built the row houses built row houses that were taller and deeper than most other South Philadelphia row houses of the time. Many of the row houses built in the 1880s in the Christian Street Historic District have an Italianate architectural style, sometimes with Victorian influences.

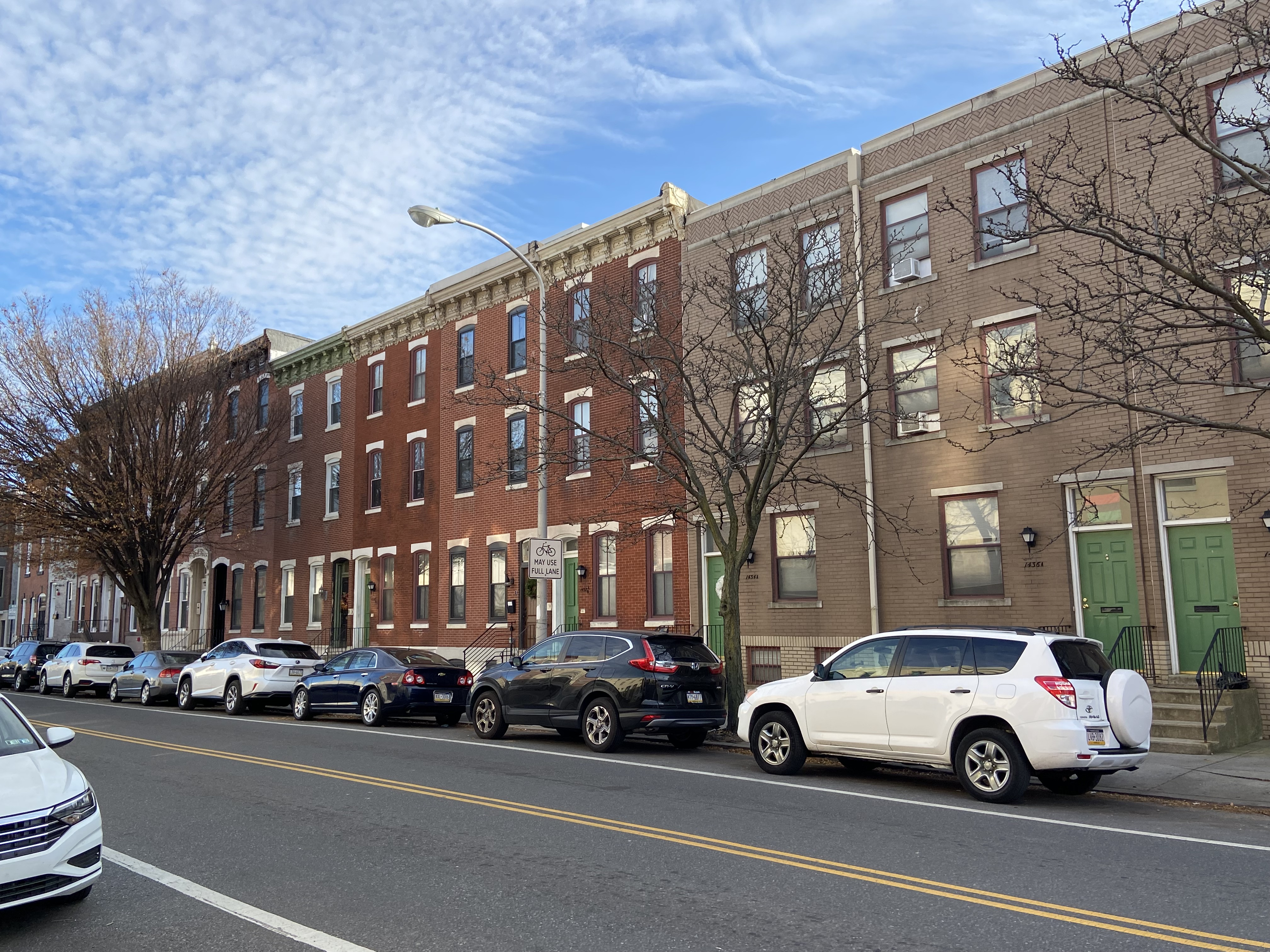
Row homes on Christian Street

Its heyday coincided with the Great Northern Migration of African-Americans which began in approximately 1916 as large numbers of African-Americans moved from the Deep South to northern cities in the United States. This migration to the Christian Street Historic District ended in approximately 1945, as North Philadelphia neighborhoods became more desirable for many middle class African-Americans. This change resulted in a decline in prestige of the neighborhood, giving rise to subsequent demolition and gentrification efforts.

The particular appeal of the neighborhood Christian Street Historic District to African-American physicians in the early 20th century was in part due to its proximity to Mercy Hospital which was the premier medical institution for African-Americans at the time, located at the corner of 17th Street and Fitzwater Street nearby the historic district.

=== Demographic changes ===
By the early twentieth century, the Irish-American residents of the Christian Street Historic District began moving to West Philadelphia and to Delaware County, Pennsylvania. This coincided with the early portion of the Great Migration of African-Americans from the American South to northern cities in the United States such as Philadelphia. Many of them took up residence in the Christian Street neighborhood as did African-Americans moving from other parts of Philadelphia.

By 1920, the majority of the population of the Christian Street Historic District was African-American, with a significant number of professionals mixed with working-class people. It was almost entirely African-American by 1940. The professional class people in the district at the time were mostly doctors, lawyers, clergymen, bankers, teachers, architects and construction contractors. They benefited from higher education at historically black colleges such as Lincoln University and Howard University and also from the University of Pennsylvania which was admitting African-American students. Demand for their services was also high due to the large and growing African-American population of Philadelphia and the fact that the city was racially segregated in various respects, thereby intensifying demand within the local African-American community.

As the demographic changes progressed, many of the Protestant churches in the district (typically Presbyterian) became Baptist or African Methodist Episcopal.

A 1919 report by the Philadelphia Tribune newspaper stated: "The most notable thoroughfare in Philadelphia to become the social centre of colored wealth and pride is Christian Street from Broad to 20th Street." The same report stated that the property values of the properties in the neighborhood owned by African-Americans were in excess of US$500,000 in 1919 dollars. It also gave a detailed listing of the properties in the neighborhood at the time.

The term "Black Doctors' Row" for this district is reported to have started in the first few years of the 21st century.

== Architectural style ==
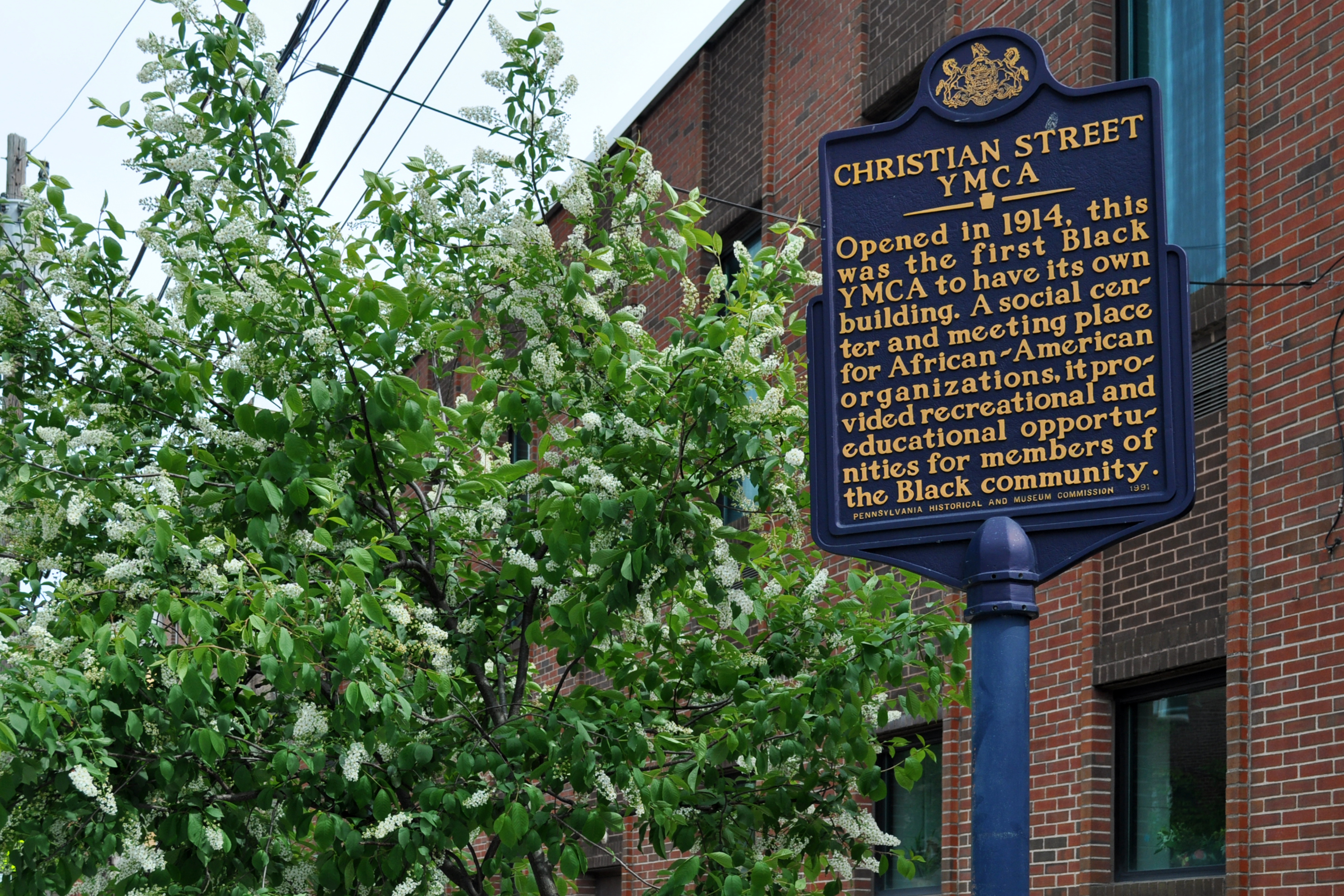
Christian Street YMCA Historical Marker at 1724 Christian Street

Much of the residential construction of the Christian Street Historic District took place in the period ranging from the 1870s to the 1890s, to house first generation and second generation Italian-Americans. Original development took place because of the proximity of the district to the Washington Avenue Factory District, which was the primary industrial zone of the city of Philadelphia at the time. The locale was particularly desirable because Christian Street and the sidewalks were wider than most in Philadelphia at the time.

Row houses were the typical residential design, with an L-shape evident in the plan view of the row houses, so as to admit more light to the homes from windows at the rear of the residential structures. They were usually three stories high. The homes were typically Italianate in style, with cornices extending along the roof lines of the entire row and decorative transoms at the windows and doors. Lintels are also common on the row houses of this district. At the time of construction, kitchens and privies were in detached structures behind the row houses. As indoor plumbing became common in the early 20th century, the detached structures were sacrificed for building construction on the neighboring Montrose Street and Webster Street. Typical selling prices for a row house unit in the early years were about $2000. Over the years, many of the residences have been expanded or modernized.

Buildings at street corners in the historic district were usually churches or mixed use buildings with businesses on the first floor and residences on higher floors.

The nomination to the Philadelphia Register of Historic Places by the Preservation Alliance of Greater Philadelphia contains an inventory of buildings in the historic district which was approved on July 8, 2022

== Preservation ==
External media
- Media related to the preservation of Black Doctors' Row
- Podcast by The Collective, Saving Black Doctors Row, Philadelphia Juneteenth Family Inc.

Gentrification efforts in the early 21st century have resulted in demolition of a significant number of buildings in the Christian Street Historic District. In 2021, the Philadelphia City Council passed a one-year moratorium on demolition in the Christian Street Historic District in order to provide time to determine if historically significant properties in the district should become permanently preserved. The preservation effort has been led by the Preservation Alliance for Greater Philadelphia supported by Philadelphia City Councilman Kenyatta Johnson. The preservation effort resulted in the first formal historic district for a historically African-American neighborhood in the city of Philadelphia.

The Christian Street Historic District was listed on the City of Philadelphia's Register of Historic Buildings on July 8, 2022.

== Controversy ==
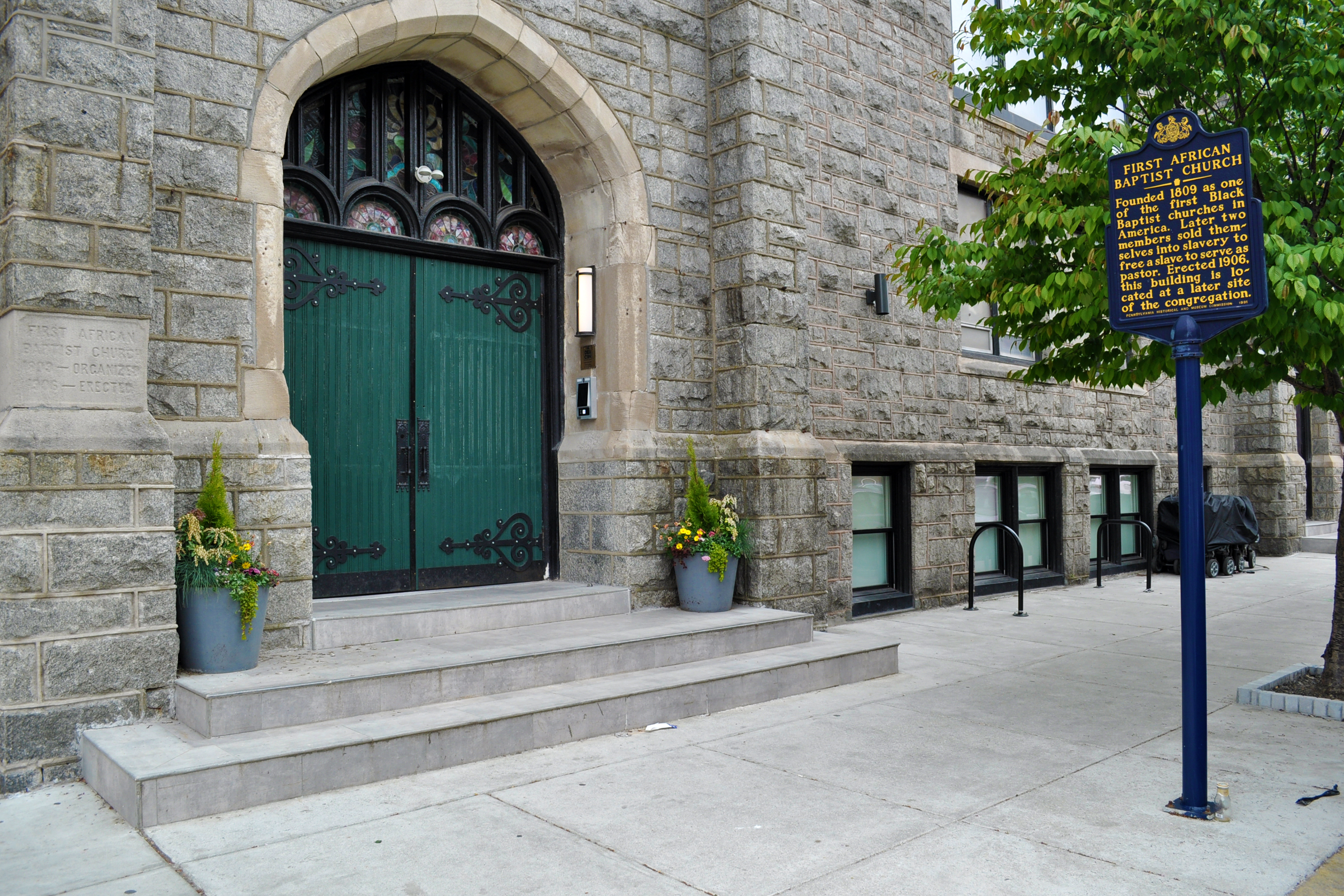
First African Baptist Church Historical Marker at 1600 Christian Street in Philadelphia

Some people contend that the designation of Black Doctors Row as an historic district minimizes the vast heritage of African-Americans in the city of Philadelphia, further stating that this designation is excessively narrow and may be an indication of elitism.

The First African Baptist Church was built in 1906 at the corner of Christian Street and 16th Street in the Christian Street Historic District. It was added to Philadelphia's Register of Historic Buildings in 2015 over the objections of the church's pastor, Terrence Griffith, who preferred to sell the building to benefit his congregation at another location.

== Notable buildings ==
- Christian Street YMCA
- Edwin M. Stanton School. It is on the National Register of Historic Places.
- Quaker City Elks Lodge
- Philadelphia bureau of the Baltimore Afro-American newspaper
- Philadelphia High School for the Creative and Performing Arts

== Notable residents ==
- Julian Francis Abele, architect, 1515 Christian Street
- Charles Albert Tindley, minister and songwriter, 1509 Christian Street
- Agnes Berry Montier, physician, first African American woman to graduate from the Temple University Medical School, 1512 Christian Street
- Frederick Massiah, contractor, 1517 Christian Street
- John C. Asbury, politician, 1710 Christian Street
- Andrew F. Stevens, banker and politician, 1840 Christian Street

== Notable residents who lived nearby ==
- Marian Anderson, singer, 762 Martin Street
- Henry McKee Minton, physician, 1130 18th Street
- Bessie Smith, singer,1319 Christian Street (the house Bessie Smith lived in was on the east side of Broad St. in an area that was approximately 75% Italian, and was demolished in the 1990s)
- Forrest White Woodard, publisher, 3860 16th Street
- Kathryn "Kitty" Fambro Woodard, publisher,3860 16th Street

== Gallery ==
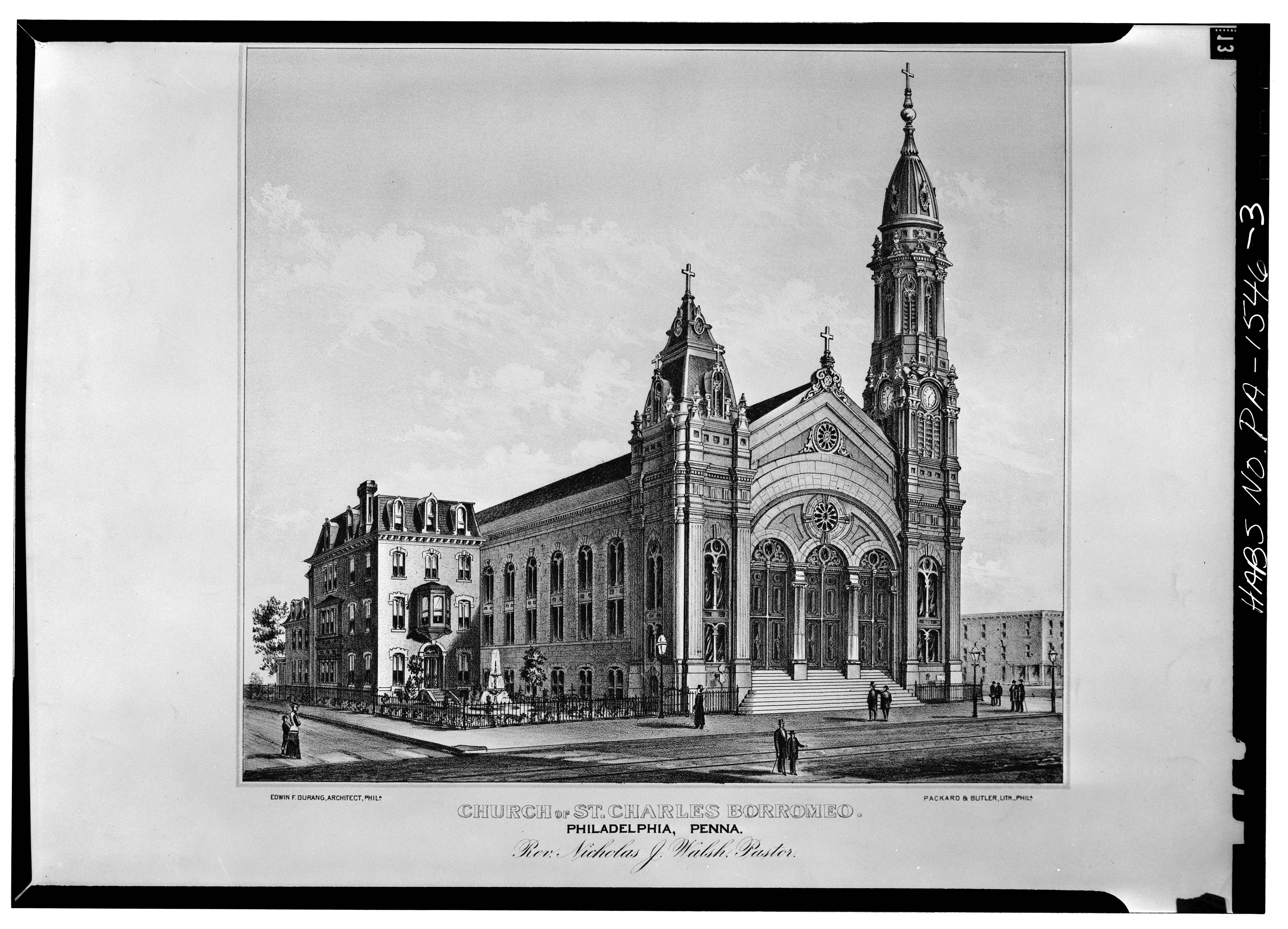
St. Charles Borromeo Roman Catholic Church, 902 South 20th Street, at the edge of Black Doctors' Row c. 1885

Tabor Presbyterian church, S.W. Corner of Christian & 18th. Sts.

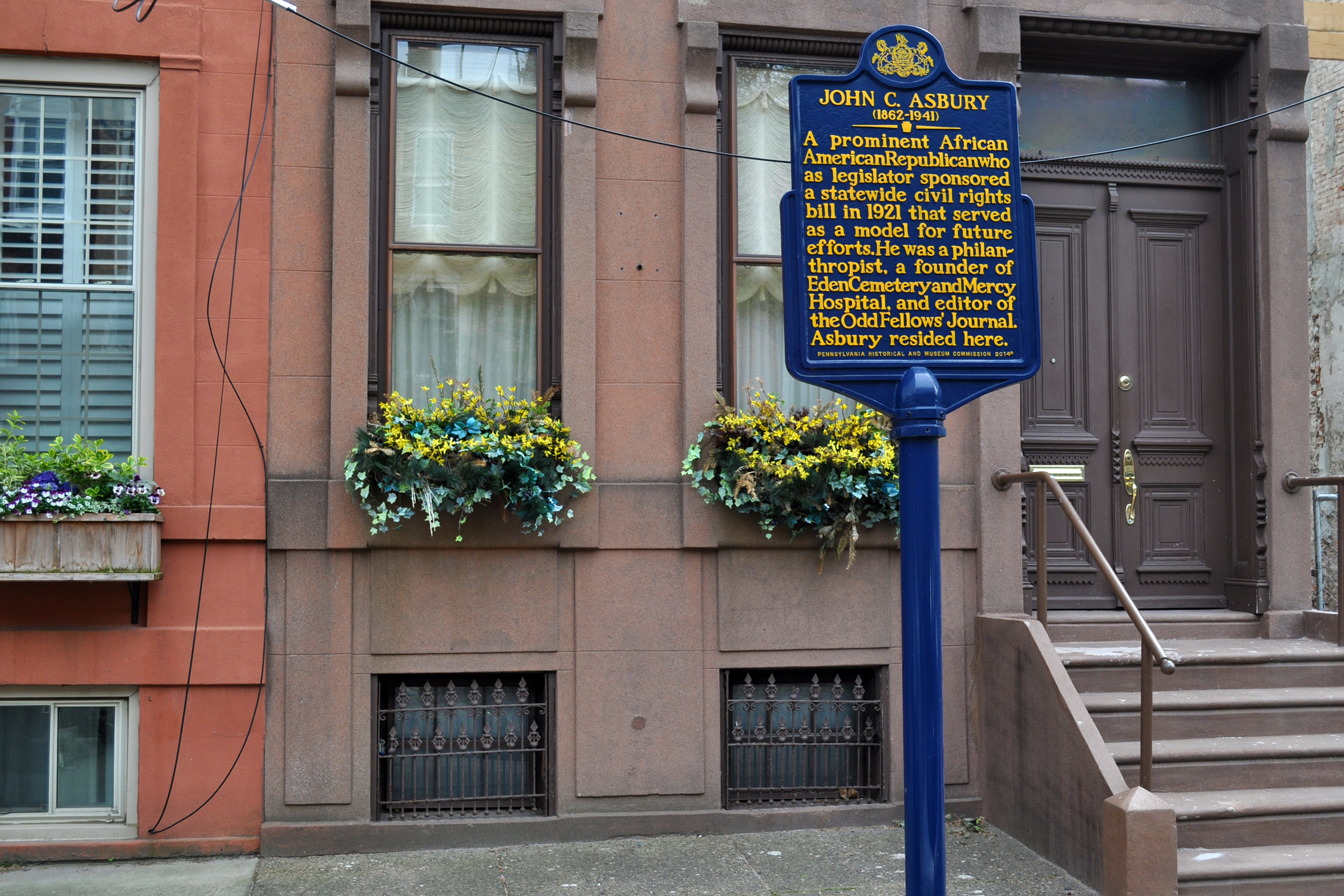
John C Asbury Historical Marker 1710 Christian St.

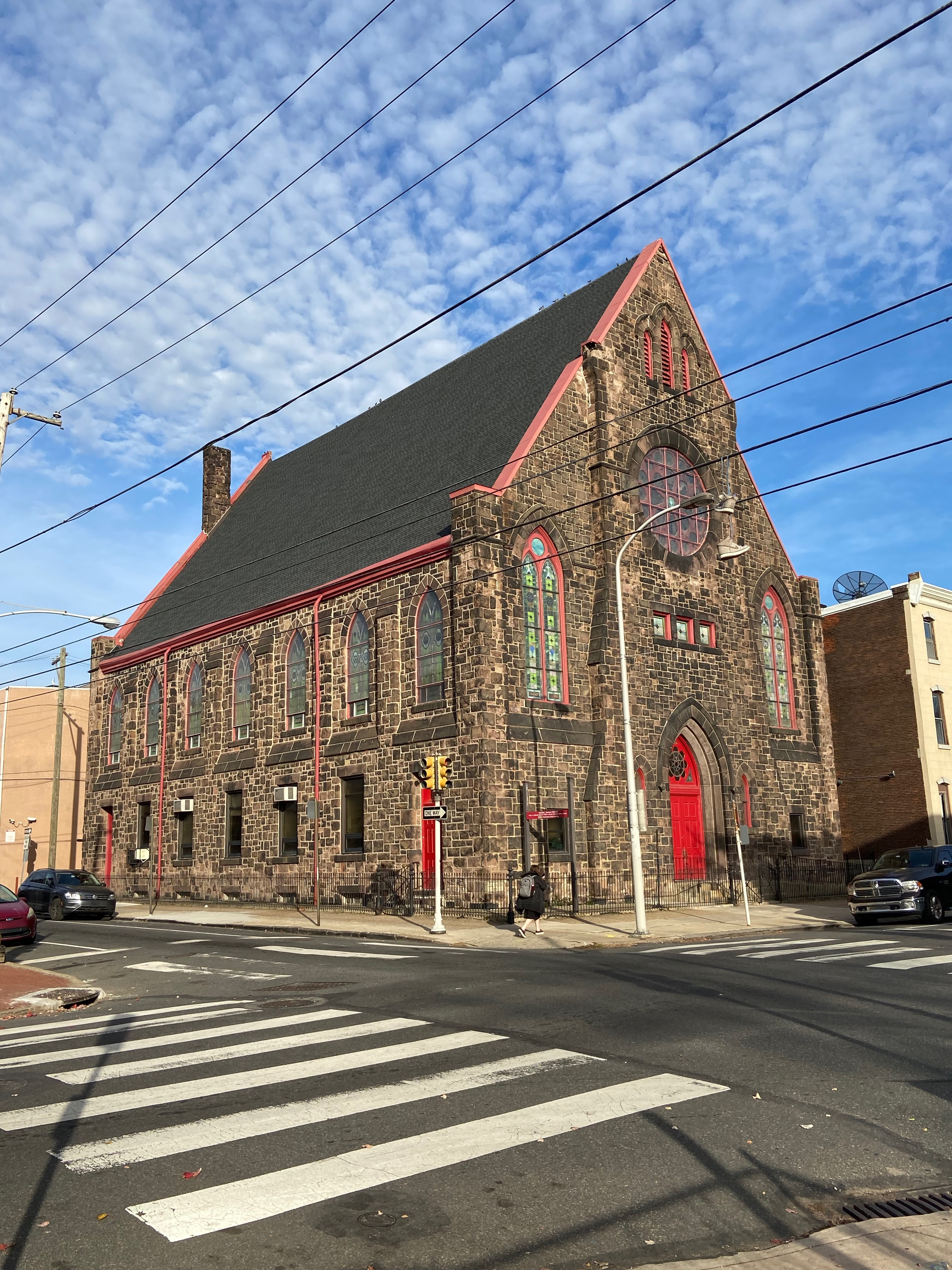
Philadelphia Ebenezer Seventh-Day Adventist Church, at 1437 Christian Street

== See also ==
- History of African Americans in Philadelphia
- History of Irish Americans in Philadelphia
- List of Philadelphia neighborhoods
- Philadelphia Register of Historic Places
