= Wendy Rieger =

American journalist and actress (1956–2022)

- Wendy Rieger at the NBC4 Desk
- Born: April 18, 1956; Norfolk, Virginia, US
- Died: April 16, 2022 (aged 65); Montgomery County, Maryland, US
- Education: Journalism, B.A., from American University in 1980
- Occupations: Journalist; environmental reporter
- Years active: 1980–2021
- Television: NBC4 Washington
- Spouses: Sol Levine (m. 1993, divorced) Dan Buckley (m. 2021)

Wendy Bell Rieger (April 18, 1956 – April 16, 2022) was an American journalist and actress. She was known for her work as an anchor person for WRC-TV.

Rieger is also known for founding Going Green, an online publication.

Rieger received numerous awards during her career, including one Local Emmy Award for her report on the Vietnam War 20 Years After the War, and an award from Washingtonian magazine.

== Early life and career ==
Rieger was born on April 18, 1956, in Norfolk, Virginia, to her father, an airline pilot, and her mother, an English teacher and polygraph examiner. Her parents divorced when she was 8 years old. Rieger had three brothers.

Before joining media, she worked briefly as an actress in Norfolk in the 1970s.

She attended American University in 1976 and graduated with a bachelor's degree in journalism in 1980.

=== Career in Public Radio and CNN (1970s-1988) ===
As a freshman at American University, she worked at WAMU, the university radio station. Her first job in journalistic career was as a newsreader for a radio station based in Tidewater.

In the 1980s, she worked with various media organizations, including WAMU, WLTT-FM and WTOP. Additionally, Rieger worked for CNN's Washington Bureau during the crack cocaine epidemic.

=== Reporter at WRC-TV (1988-2021) ===
In 1988, she joined WRC-TV as a nighttime reporter. In 1998, she was promoted to a weekend anchor. In 2001, she was promoted to an anchor for the evening weekday newscast.

In 2005, during her time at WRC-TV, Rieger launched the popular environmental segment and accompanying blog Going Green. These were inspired by a report Rieger made about a local woman allergic to chemicals in her household. This feature Going Green was picked up by other local NBC stations and inspired a similar segment on NBC Nightly News.

In 2008, she received the Washingtonian Green Award from for her work on environmental safety and preservation.

She retired from WRC-TV in December 2021, after having worked there for 33 years.

== Health and Death ==
In October 2020, Rieger underwent open-heart surgery to repair a faulty mitral valve.

In April 2021, she began feeling unwell, and was forced to miss the funeral of former colleague Joe Krebs. A month later she was diagnosed with glioblastoma, a terminal form of brain cancer. Rieger had surgery to remove most of the tumor later that year. On April 16, 2022, Rieger died in a hospice facility due to complications from the tumor just two days before her 66th birthday.

Various local leaders responded to news of Rieger's death. Washington D.C. Mayor Muriel Bowser described Rieger as "one of DC's most beloved anchors." Then-Maryland Governor Larry Hogan called Rieger "one-of-a-kind." Following news of her death, her name trended nationally on Twitter.

== Personal life ==
Rieger's first marriage was in the 1990s to CNN executive Sol Levine. It ended in divorce. She married again in 2021 with a former NBC4 photographer, Dan Buckley.

Throughout her career, Rieger had been an active LGBTQ-rights activist. She had worked both with SMYAL (Supporting and Mentoring Youth Activists and Leaders) and the Gay Men's Chorus of Washington D.C. In 2015, she was named the Best Local Anchor for Washington Blade's Best of Gay issue, for which she participated in a photoshoot with a drag queen.

== Legacy ==
Rieger's style of delivering news was widely appreciated across the DC area. The Washington Post described her delivery style of news as "self-effacing, opinionated and humorous by turns." WTOP wrote that "Rieger was known for employing her quick wit, as well as capturing the hearts and attention of viewers."

Following her death, Dan Buckley established the Wendy Rieger Memorial Scholarship Fund at American University in her honor. The endowed scholarship is meant to benefit students studying journalism at American University's School of Communication and to "allow students who might not have been able to study journalism avenues to follow their passions."
