= YMCA Philadelphia =

- Young Men's Christian Association
- U.S. National Register of Historic Places
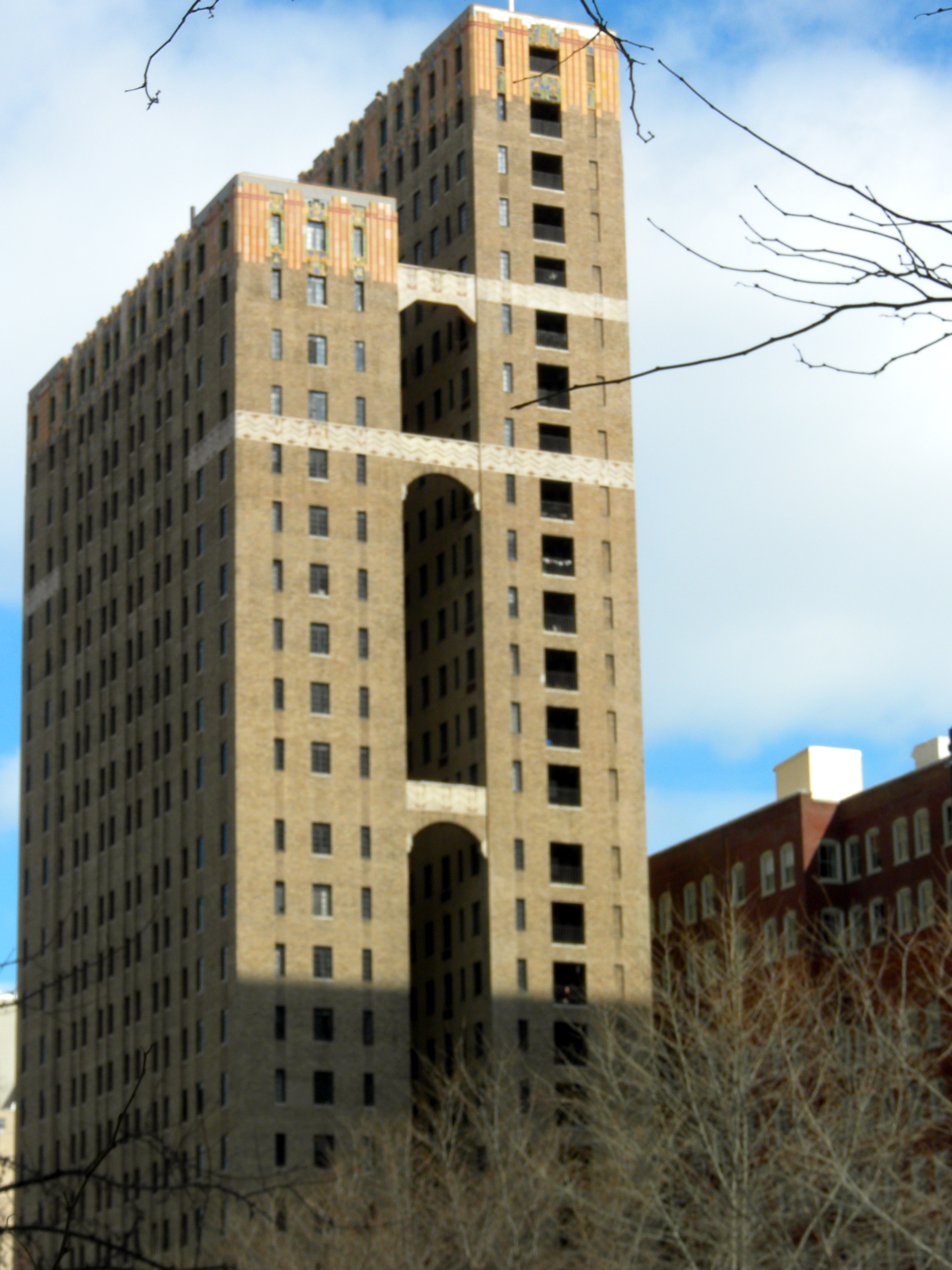
- Philadelphia YMCA Building, February 2010

- Location within Pennsylvania
- Location: 115 N. 15th St., Philadelphia, Pennsylvania
- Coordinates: 39°57′17″N 75°09′53″W
- Area: 0.2 acres (0.081 ha)
- Built: 1926
- Architect: Jallade, Louis E.
- Architectural style: Art Deco
- NRHP reference No.: 80003624
- Added to NRHP: December 2, 1980

YMCA Philadelphia, also Greater Philadelphia YMCA was founded on June 15, 1854, by George H. Stuart, a prominent Philadelphia businessman and importer. The goal of the Association was to reach "the many thousands of neglected youth not likely to be brought under any moral influence by any other means."

The Greater Philadelphia YMCA is a community service organization that promotes positive values through programs designed for kids, adults, and families. Over the years, Greater Philadelphia YMCA has grown to include 15 branches, over 80 child care sites, multiple community outreach locations, and a stand-alone gymnastics center in the Greater Philadelphia area and New Jersey.

The headquarters for the Greater Philadelphia YMCA is located inside the Borough of Conshohocken Administration & Police building in Conshohocken, PA.

== Branches ==
Branches are YMCA locations which usually include a gymnasium, swimming pool, and fitness center. Membership provides access to these facilities.

Each branch offers additional services such as youth programs and swimming lessons, group exercise, personal training, and free babysitting services.

Branch Name	Service Area	Branch Photo
Ambler YMCA	Ambler Area YMCA, serves Ambler, Fort Washington, Blue Bell, Horsham, North Wales and the surrounding communities.	Ambler YMCA
Boyertown YMCA	Boyertown YMCA, serves Boyertown, Bechtelsville, Gilbertsville, New Hanover, Washington Township and the surrounding communities.	Boyertown YMCA
Christian Street YMCA	Christian Street YMCA, serves South Philadelphia, Center City and the surrounding communities. It is located within the Christian Street Historic District.	Christian Street YMCA
Columbia North YMCA	Columbia North YMCA, serves North Philadelphia, Fairmount, Kensington, Port Richmond and the surrounding communities.	Columbia North YMCA
Haverford YMCA	Haverford YMCA, serves Havertown and the surrounding Main Line communities of Bryn Mawr, Villanova, Ardmore and Haverford.	Haverford YMCA
Mt. Laurel YMCA	Mt. Laurel YMCA, serves Mt. Laurel, Moorestown and the surrounding communities.	Mt. Laurel YMCA
Northeast Family YMCA	Northeast Family YMCA, serves Northeast Philadelphia, Somerton, Bustleton, Normandy and the surrounding communities.	Northeast Family YMCA
Phoenixville YMCA	Phoenixville YMCA, serves Phoenixville, Valley Forge, King of Prussia, Malvern, Audubon, Spring City, Royersford, Collegville and Kimberton.	Phoenixville YMCA
Pottstown YMCA	Pottstown YMCA, serves Pottstown, Norristown, Broomall and Reading, and the surrounding communities.	Pottstown YMCA
Rocky Run YMCA	Rocky Run YMCA, serves Media, Aston, Newtown Square, Edgemont, Springfield and the surrounding communities.	Rocky Run YMCA
Roxborough YMCA	Roxborough YMCA, serving Roxborough, Manayunk, Lafayette Hill, Chestnut Hill and the surrounding communities.	Roxborough YMCA
Spring Valley YMCA	Spring Valley YMCA, serving Limerick, Pottstown, Harleysville, Lansdale, Skippack, Collegeville and the surrounding communities.	Spring Valley YMCA
Upper Perkiomen Valley YMCA	Upper Perkiomen Valley YMCA, serving Pennsburg, Doylestown, Allentown, Quakertown and the surrounding communities.	Upper Perkiomen Valley YMCA
West Philadelphia YMCA	West Philadelphia YMCA, serves West Philadelphia, Wynnefield, Elmwood and the surrounding communities.	West Philadelphia YMCA
Willow Grove YMCA	Willow Grove YMCA, serving Willow Grove, Hatboro, Horsham and the surrounding communities.	Willow Grove YMCA
