= WRC-TV =

Television station in Washington, D.C.

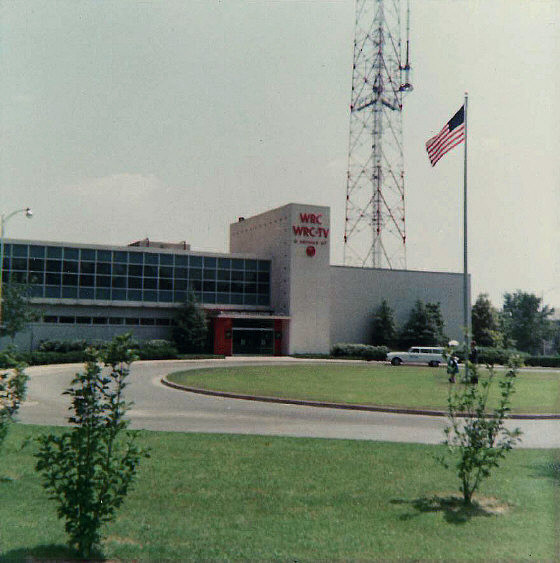
- WRC-TV's studios and transmitter facility has been in use since 1958. (1962 photograph)
- Washington, D.C.; United States
- Channels: Digital: 34 (UHF), shared with WZDC-CD; Virtual: 4
- Branding: NBC 4; News 4

Programming
- Affiliations: 4.1: NBC; for others, see § Subchannels

Ownership
- Owner: NBC Owned Television Stations; (NBC Telemundo License LLC)
- Sister stations: WZDC-CD

History
- First air date: June 27, 1947
- Former call signs: WNBW (1947–1954)
- Former channel numbers: Analog: 4 (VHF, 1947–2009); Digital: 48 (UHF, 1998–2019)
- Call sign meaning: Radio Corporation of America (NBC's former parent)

Technical information
- Licensing authority: FCC
- Facility ID: 47904
- ERP: 1,000 kW
- HAAT: 244 m (801 ft)
- Transmitter coordinates: 38°56′24″N 77°4′53″W

Links
- Public license information: Public file; LMS
- Website: www.nbcwashington.com

WRC-TV (channel 4) is a television station in Washington, D.C. It is owned and operated by the NBC television network via its NBC Owned Television Stations division. Under common ownership with Class A Telemundo outlet WZDC-CD (channel 44), the two stations share studio and transmitter facilities on Nebraska Avenue in the Tenleytown neighborhood of Northwest Washington.

Through a channel sharing agreement, both stations transmit using WRC-TV's spectrum from a tower adjacent to their studios.

== History ==
The station traces its roots to experimental television station W3XNB, which was put on the air by the Radio Corporation of America (RCA), the then-parent company of NBC, in 1939. A construction permit with the commercial call sign WNBW (standing for "NBC Washington") was first issued on channel 3 (60–66 MHz, numbered channel 2 prior to 1946) on December 23, 1941. NBC requested this permit to be cancelled on June 29, 1942; channel 3 was reassigned to Harrisonburg, Virginia (WHSV-TV), in 1953.

On June 27, 1947, WNBW was re-licensed on channel 4 and signed on the air. Channel 4 is the second-oldest commercially licensed television station in Washington, after WTTG (channel 5), which signed on seven months earlier in December 1946. WNBW was also the second of the five original NBC-owned television stations to sign-on, behind WNBT in New York City and ahead of WNBQ in Chicago, WNBK in Cleveland and KNBH in Los Angeles. The station was operated alongside WRC radio (980 AM, now WTEM, and 93.9 FM, now WKYS).

On October 18, 1954, the television station's call sign changed to the present WRC-TV to match its radio sisters. The new calls reflected NBC's ownership at the time by RCA. It has retained its "-TV" suffix to this day, nearly four decades after the radio stations were sold off and changed call letters.

In 1955, while in college (at the nearby University of Maryland) and serving as a puppeteer on a WRC-TV program, Jim Henson was asked to create a puppet show for the station. The series he created, Sam and Friends, was the first series to feature the Muppets, and launched the Jim Henson Company.

The earliest color videotape in existence is a recording of the dedication of WRC-TV's Washington studios on May 22, 1958. President Dwight D. Eisenhower spoke at the event, introduced by NBC President Robert W. Sarnoff. Before Eisenhower spoke, Sarnoff pushed a button, which converted the previously black and white signal into color. It was also the first time a U.S. president had been videotaped in color.

At the time of its sign-on, channel 4 was one of two wholly network-owned stations in Washington, the other being DuMont's WTTG. DuMont was shut down in 1956, and for the next 30 years, WRC-TV was Washington's only network owned-and-operated station.

The second presidential debate between candidates John F. Kennedy and Richard M. Nixon was broadcast from the station's studios on October 7, 1960. David Brinkley's Washington segment of the Huntley-Brinkley Report originated at WRC-TV between 1956 and 1970, as did Washington reports or commentaries by Brinkley or John Chancellor on NBC Nightly News in the 1970s.

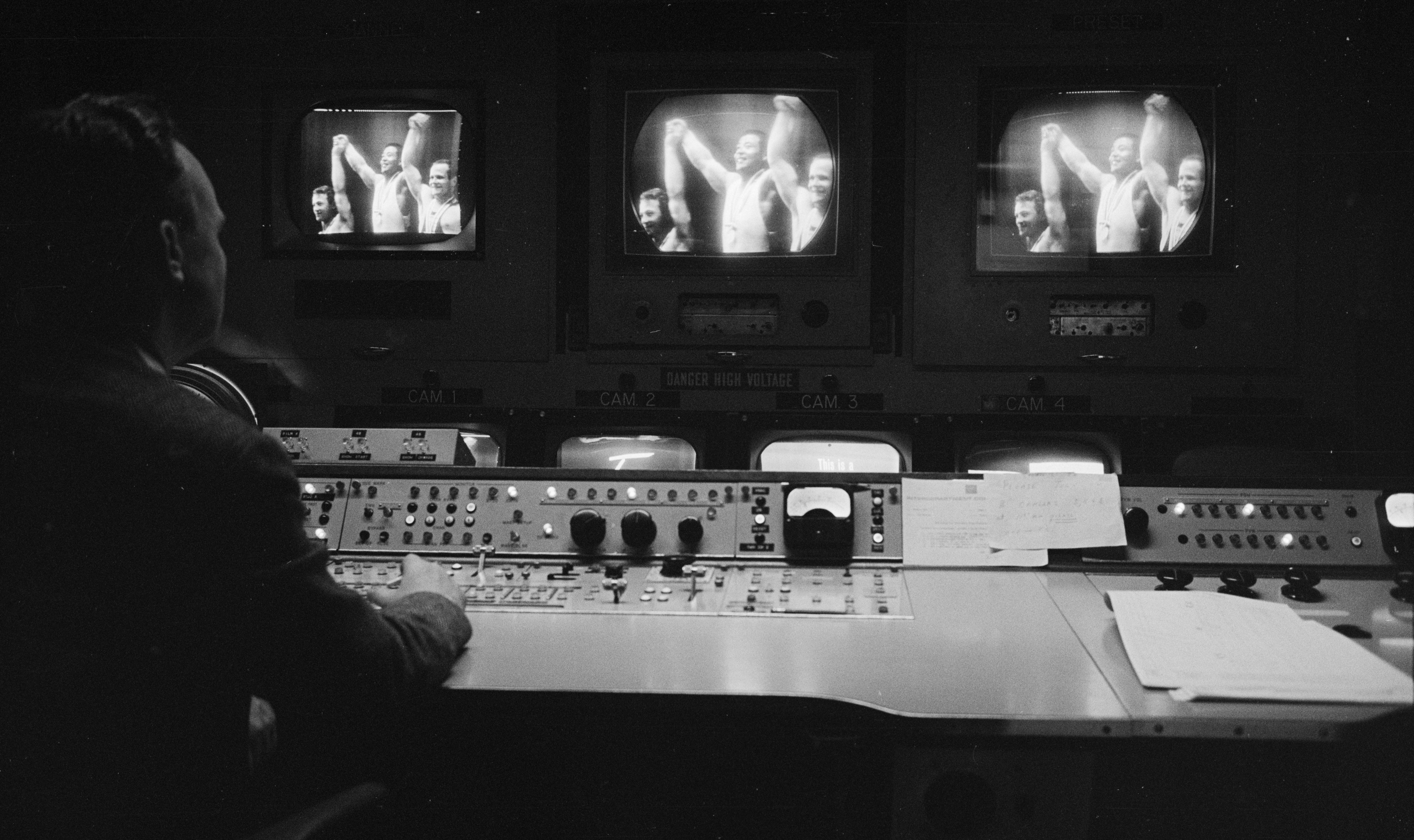
WRC-TV production control room broadcasting the 1964 Summer Olympics

From the opening of its Nebraska Avenue facility in 1958 through 2020, WRC-TV housed NBC News' Washington bureau, out of which the network's long-running political affairs program Meet the Press was based. In January 2021, NBC News moved the bureau near Capitol Hill.

=== Telemundo affiliation ===
In September 2017, NBC announced they were to launch a new Telemundo owned-and-operated station based out of WRC-TV. ZGS Communications, owner of Washington's existing Telemundo affiliate WZDC-CD (channel 25), sold the station's channel allocation in the Federal Communications Commission (FCC)'s 2017–18 incentive auction, accepting a $66 million payout to turn off its signal and continue operations by sharing the channel of another station. A Telemundo spokesperson stated that the sale of WZDC's spectrum "gave us the ability to take back the Telemundo affiliation for this market", without elaborating what that meant. NBC later purchased WZDC-CD with the intention of moving its over-the-air signal to that of WRC-TV through a channel-sharing agreement.

NBC took control of WZDC-CD on January 1, 2018, and added a temporary relay to WRC-TV's digital subchannel 4.3. The channel-sharing agreement took effect on March 7, 2018. Under the agreement, WZDC shares WRC-TV's physical signal as a subchannel would and is managed with its own virtual channel number and license. WZDC's virtual channel changed from 25.1 to 44.1 to avoid a conflict with WDVM-TV, which also occupies virtual channel 25.1.

== Programming ==
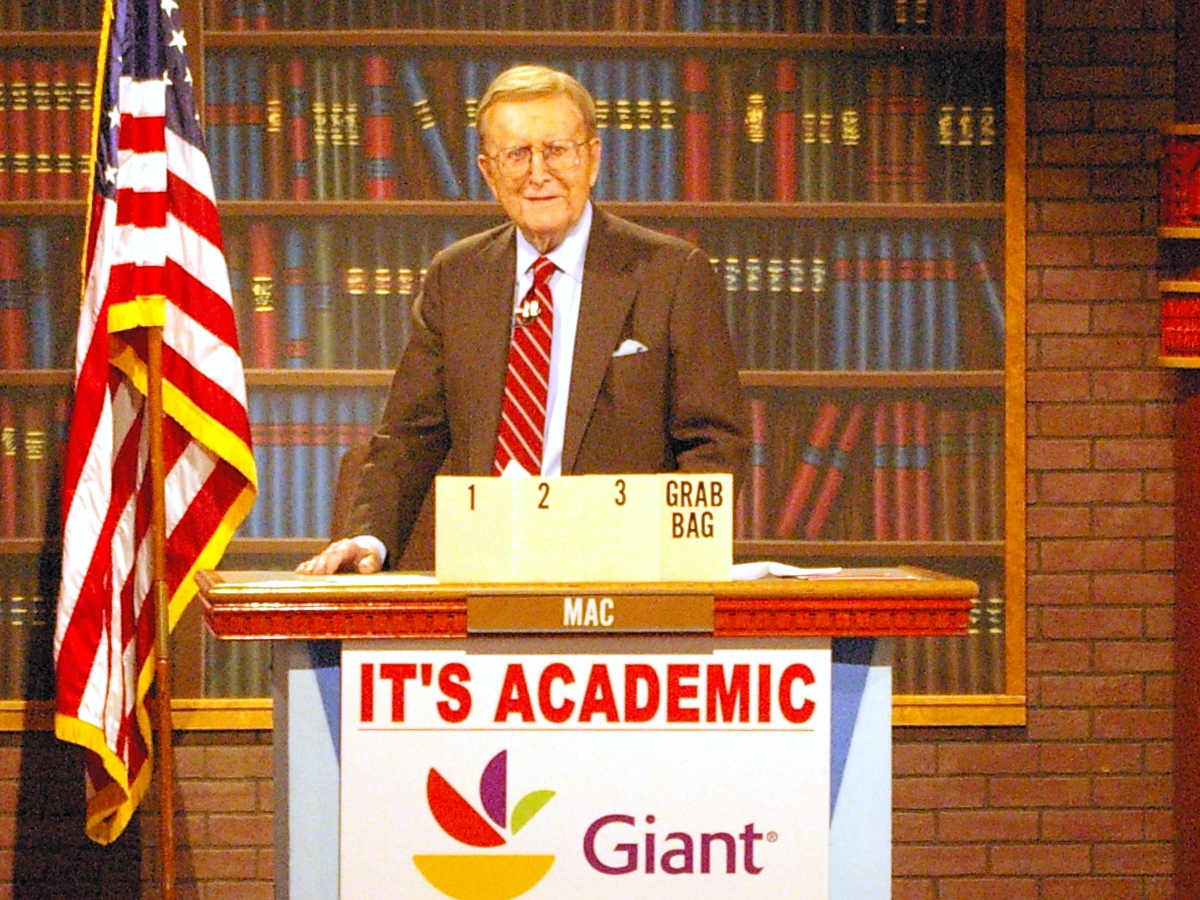
The late Mac McGarry was the original host of It's Academic until June 2011. (Photo is from c. 2009.)

Because of its ownership by the network, WRC-TV generally carries the entire NBC network schedule. However, the station airs NBC Nightly News at 7 p.m. (rather than 6:30 p.m. as with most NBC stations in the Eastern Time Zone); this is due to an hour-long 6 p.m. newscast. The weekend edition of the network's newscast airs at its usual 6:30 p.m. time slot. Despite being the originating station of Meet the Press for most of the show's history, it airs on a 90-minute delay at 10:30 a.m., competing head-to-head with CBS's Face the Nation.

WRC-TV previously housed It's Academic, which premiered in 1961 and is the longest-running game show in television history according to the Guinness Book of World Records (as of October 29, 2022, it is now aired on PBS member station WETA-TV). Sam and Friends, Jim Henson's late-night precursor to Sesame Street and The Muppet Show, got its start on WRC-TV on May 9, 1955. WRC-TV served as the production facilities for the original run of The McLaughlin Group from its premiere in 1982 until May 2008, when the production facilities moved to Tegna Inc.-owned CBS affiliate and WRC-TV's rival WUSA and it remained until the original show's ending in 2016.

=== Sports programming ===
WRC-TV was the over-the-air home of Washington Commanders (formerly the Washington Redskins) preseason games from 2009 through 2023. Before the Comcast–NBC Universal merger, games were syndicated to over-the-air stations only in standard definition, with actual rights-holder CSN Mid-Atlantic (later NBC Sports Washington, now Monumental Sports Network) exclusively airing the high definition broadcast.

=== News operation ===
WRC-TV presently broadcasts 45 hours, 20 minutes of locally produced newscasts each week (with 7 hours, 34 minutes each weekday; three hours on Saturdays; and 4 1/2 hours on Sundays). By 2001, WRC's newscasts had all been rated number one in the market, with some of the success attributed to Jim Vance and Doreen Gentzler, who anchored together from 1989 until Vance's death in 2017. Vance had been with Channel 4 since 1969 and was promoted to anchor three years later. In the May 2010 sweeps, it placed first at 5 a.m., 6 a.m., 6 p.m. and 11 p.m. in total viewers, and first at 6 a.m., 6 p.m. and 11 p.m. in the 25–54 demo.

In 1974, WRC-TV adopted the NewsCenter branding, following the three other NBC-owned stations at the time in New York, Los Angeles and Chicago in adopting the NewsCenter branding.

In 1975, the station adopted MFSB's song "My Mood" as the closing theme music for the 6 and 11 p.m. newscasts every Friday, which remains in use by the station today. Charlie Rose was hired by WRC-TV after his short stint at KXAS-TV in Fort Worth, Texas, and hosted the Charlie Rose Show from its premiere in 1980 until he left the station in 1984 for CBS News. The station also hired George Michael as sports anchor, eventually launching the nationally syndicated program The George Michael Sports Machine, which originated from the studios of WRC-TV from its entire run from 1984 until 2007.

In 1982, after eight years of using the NewsCenter branding, the news branding was changed to Channel 4 News. The station added a 5 pm newscast in 1984. In 1991, WRC-TV added a morning newscast under the title of News 4 Today. That same year, between January 14 to October 25, 1991, WRC-TV produced a newscast for independent station WFTY (channel 50). 7:30 News Headlines was anchored by Wendy Rieger and sought to cater to an upscale audience. It was the first such news-share program ever announced and the second to air. (Note: Twelve days earlier, a similar newscast production agreement had started between WNEP-TV and WOLF in Scranton, Pennsylvania.) However, the newscast attracted worse ratings than the show it replaced on channel 50, The Avengers. It was doomed by low ratings, a poor economy, and the Gulf War, with the start of that conflict scrambling local news viewing habits merely three days later; as a result, WRC-TV ended the arrangement effective October 25, 1991.

On January 14, 2009, WRC-TV and WTTG entered into a Local News Service (called LNS) agreement in which the two stations pool video and share news helicopter footage. The agreement was similar to ones already made between Fox and NBC owned-and-operated stations in Chicago (WMAQ-TV and WFLD) and Philadelphia (WCAU and WTXF). WUSA later joined that agreement. In 2012, news director Camille Edwards announced the station would no longer participate in LNS, but the stations would continue to share the helicopter. In 2016, the station launched its own helicopter, Chopper4.

Starting with News 4 Today on February 27, 2023, WRC-TV's newscasts moved to a new studio that formerly housed Meet the Press, where an entirely new set debuted for the first time in almost 13 years.

On August 12, 2024, WRC-TV's morning newscast moved its starting time back to 4:25 a.m., leaving WTTG as the only station in the Washington market to start its morning newscast at 4 a.m. On that same day, the previously online-only 7:30 p.m. newscast News 4 Rundown started airing on the station, moving Access Hollywood to 3:30 a.m.

In 2025, the station established a partnership with the Montgomery County bureau of The Baltimore Banner. Banner journalists will appear on WRC and its Telemundo sister station.

On September 14, 2026, WRC-TV expanded its local news hours by launching a new midday newscast, News 4 at Noon, marking the first time the station had aired a newscast in that time slot in 30 years. The new program replaced Access Daily with Mario & Kit, moving into its former time slot.

==== Notable current on-air staff ====
- Aaron Gilchrist – anchor
- Tony Perkins – anchor
- Eun Yang – anchor

==== Notable former on-air staff ====
- Miguel Almaguer – reporter (2006–2009)
- Jess Atkinson – sports anchor (1990–1996)
- Shannon Bream – anchor (2004–2007)
- Nick Charles – sports anchor/reporter (1976–1979)
- Katie Couric – reporter (1987–1989)
- Lindsay Czarniak – sports anchor/reporter (2005–2011)
- Steve Doocy – features reporter (1983–1989)
- Peter Ford – news anchor (1988–1992)
- Doreen Gentzler – anchor (1989–2022)
- Angie Goff – anchor (2011–2018)
- Savannah Guthrie – reporter (2000–2002)
- Robert Hager – reporter (1960s)
- Mike Hambrick – anchor (1982–1985)
- Steve Handelsman – reporter (1984–2017)
- Richard C. Harkness – Washington correspondent for NBC network and local radio/TV news anchor (1942–1970)
- Leon Harris – anchor (2017–2025)
- Jim Hartz – anchor (1977–1979)
- Dan Hellie – sports anchor (2006–2013)
- Cathy Hobbs – anchor/reporter (1994–1997)
- Joe Johns – reporter (1983–1993)
- Veronica Johnson – meteorologist (2000–2016)
- Susan King – anchor/reporter (1983–1987)
- Joe Krebs – anchor/reporter (1980–2012)
- Scott MacFarlane – investigative reporter (2013–2021)
- Suzanne Malveaux – reporter (1996-1999)
- Dave Marash – anchor (1985–1989)
- Marjorie Margolies – reporter (1975–1990)
- Doug McKelway – anchor/reporter (1992–2001)
- Craig Melvin – anchor (2008–2011)
- George Michael – sports anchor/reporter; former host of The George Michael Sports Machine (1980–2008)
- Wendy Rieger – anchor (1988–2021)
- Bob Ryan – chief meteorologist (1980–2010)
- Jim Rosenfield – anchor (2012–2013)
- Dianna Russini – sports anchor/reporter (2013–2015)
- Willard Scott – NBC page (1950), Bozo the Clown (1959–1962), weather anchor (1968–1980)
- Sue Simmons – anchor/reporter (1976–1980)
- Somara Theodore – meteorologist (2016–2022)
- Jim Vance – anchor (1969–2017)
- Nicole Zaloumis – sports anchor/reporter (2004–2005)

== Technical information ==
=== Subchannels ===
Subchannels of WRC-TV and WZDC-CD
License	Subchannel	Res.	Short name	Programming
WRC-TV	4.1	1080i	WRC-HD	NBC
WRC-TV	4.2	480i	COZI	Cozi TV
WRC-TV	4.3	480i	CRIMES	NBC True CRMZ
WRC-TV	4.4	480i	Oxygen	Oxygen
WZDC-CD	44.1	1080i	WZDC	Telemundo
WZDC-CD	44.2	480i	XITOS	TeleXitos

=== Analog-to-digital conversion ===
WRC-TV ended regular programming on its analog signal, on VHF channel 4, on June 12, 2009, the official date on which full-power television stations in the United States transitioned from analog to digital broadcasts under federal mandate. The station's digital signal continued to broadcast on its pre-transition UHF channel 48, using virtual channel 4.

The station participated in the "Analog Nightlight" program, with its analog signal carrying information on the digital transition until analog signal broadcasts were permanently discontinued on June 26, 2009.

Beginning in 1996, WRC-TV's studios were the home of WHD-TV, an experimental high definition television station owned by a consortium of industry groups and stations which carried the nation's first program in the format transmitted by a television station, an episode of Meet the Press, and aired on UHF channel 34 to provide the FCC and the National Association of Broadcasters a channel to conduct many experiments in the new format. WHD-TV was discontinued in late 1999.

== See also ==
- List of three-letter broadcast call signs in the United States
