= WHD-TV =

Developmental television station in Washington, D.C.

- Washington, D.C.; United States
- Channels: Digital: 27, 30 & 34 (UHF)

Ownership
- Owner: Model HDTV Station Project, Inc.

History
- Founded: 1996
- First air date: July 30, 1996
- Last air date: November 1999
- Call sign meaning: "High Definition Television"

WHD-TV was a television station in Washington, D.C., which operated from July 30, 1996, until November 1999. It was part of a joint industry project, used to develop and test a common "Grand Alliance" digital TV standard, that replaced the earlier analog NTSC TV standard used in the United States.

== History ==
In the 1990s, U.S. TV stations began preparations to switch from an analog NTSC transmission standard to a more efficient digital standard, which provided for higher definition transmissions and additional programming channels, while continuing to occupy 6 MHz of spectrum space.

WHD-TV was characterized as a "model" station. Referring to the federal government, and the Federal Communications Commission (FCC) in particular, it was stated that Washington, D.C., was chosen as the development site in order "to ensure it gets noticed by policy makers". The main sponsors were the Electronic Industries Association (EIA) and the Association for Maximum Service Television (AMST), in addition to equipment manufacturers and over 200 TV stations.

In April 1996, the consortium announced that "Washington DC's nine TV stations have until 3 May to submit bids for the right to broadcast from the Model HDTV Station, and project managers will pick a winner by the end of the month." The equipment and offices for WHD-TV were ultimately co-located in the basement of the building used by NBC-owned WRC-TV.

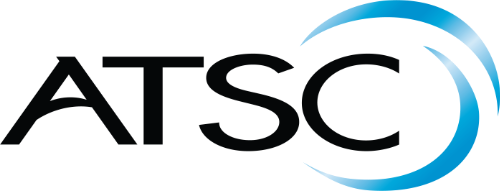
The station project established the ATSC digital TV broadcasting standards

The project developed the Advanced Television Systems Committee (ATSC) digital TV broadcast standards. Initial test transmissions began on July 30, 1996, which included the movie Lawrence of Arabia, and the NBC public affairs program Meet the Press. Because HDTV receivers were not yet available to the general public, these transmissions were only viewed by the local staff.

In 1998, it was announced that the project had about a year to run. Funding, originally scheduled to last for three years until mid-1999, was later extended for a few additional months. The project's shutdown featured "a week-long celebration starting November 8".
