= Doreen Gentzler =

American journalist

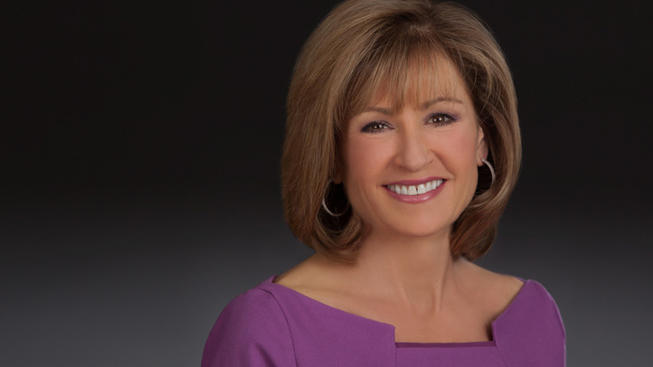
- Born: September 24, 1957 (age 68)
- Education: University of Georgia
- Occupation: Journalist
- Years active: 1979–2022
- Spouse: Bill Miller
- Children: 2
- Parents: Ferris Gentzler (father); Rita O'Flinn (mother)

Doreen Gentzler (born September 24, 1957) is an American retired television news anchor. She anchored the news at 6 p.m. and 11 p.m. on WRC-TV in Washington, D.C.

== Early life ==
Gentzler was raised in the Dominion Hills neighborhood of Arlington, Virginia. Her mother, Rita O'Flinn, worked as a secretary for the federal government while her father, Ferris Gentzler, was an executive with an insurance company. Her family moved to Mount Pleasant, South Carolina when she was 11 years old. Her family came back to the area when she left for college at the University of Georgia.

Gentzler is a 1979 graduate of the Henry W. Grady College of Journalism and Mass Communication, University of Georgia.

== Career ==
Gentzler began her career as the host of Georgia Public Broadcasting's weeknight show The Lawmakers, broadcast during sessions of the Georgia State Legislature, around 1979.

Gentzler first worked at Cleveland, Ohio's NBC affiliate WKYC-TV. There she anchored the 6pm and 11pm newscasts. From 1979 to 1983, she co-anchored the 6pm and 11pm newscasts at WSOC-TV, the ABC affiliate in Charlotte, North Carolina. Next she worked at Philadelphia's WCAU-TV, which was then a CBS affiliate, on the crime beat.

Gentzler joined at NBC4 in 1989, after the departure of Dave Marash. She co-anchored the weekday 6 p.m. and 11 p.m. editions of News4 on WRC-TV (NBC4) in Washington, D.C., and was also the station's health reporter. Her reports have taken her around the world, including the Persian Gulf, Bosnia and Ecuador. Her health reports could usually be seen on News4 at 5 p.m., and other station newscasts. She was the on-air spokesperson for the station's successful NBC4 Health and Fitness Expo, held each January at the Washington Convention Center. She has also made appearances as herself on NBC shows The Event and The Blacklist.

Gentzler anchored WRC's 6pm news alongside veteran anchor Jim Vance for 28 years – a partnership that lasted until Vance's death in July 2017.

On October 28, 2022, she announced her retirement on the 6 p.m. news. Her last newscast was on November 23, 2022.

== Personal life ==
Gentzler is married to Bill Miller, a former reporter and editor at The Washington Post, who specialized in law enforcement coverage. They have two children: son Chris (b. 1991) and daughter Carson (b. 1994). Gentzler lives in Chevy Chase, Maryland.
