= Edwin M. Stanton School (Philadelphia) =

- U.S. National Register of Historic Places
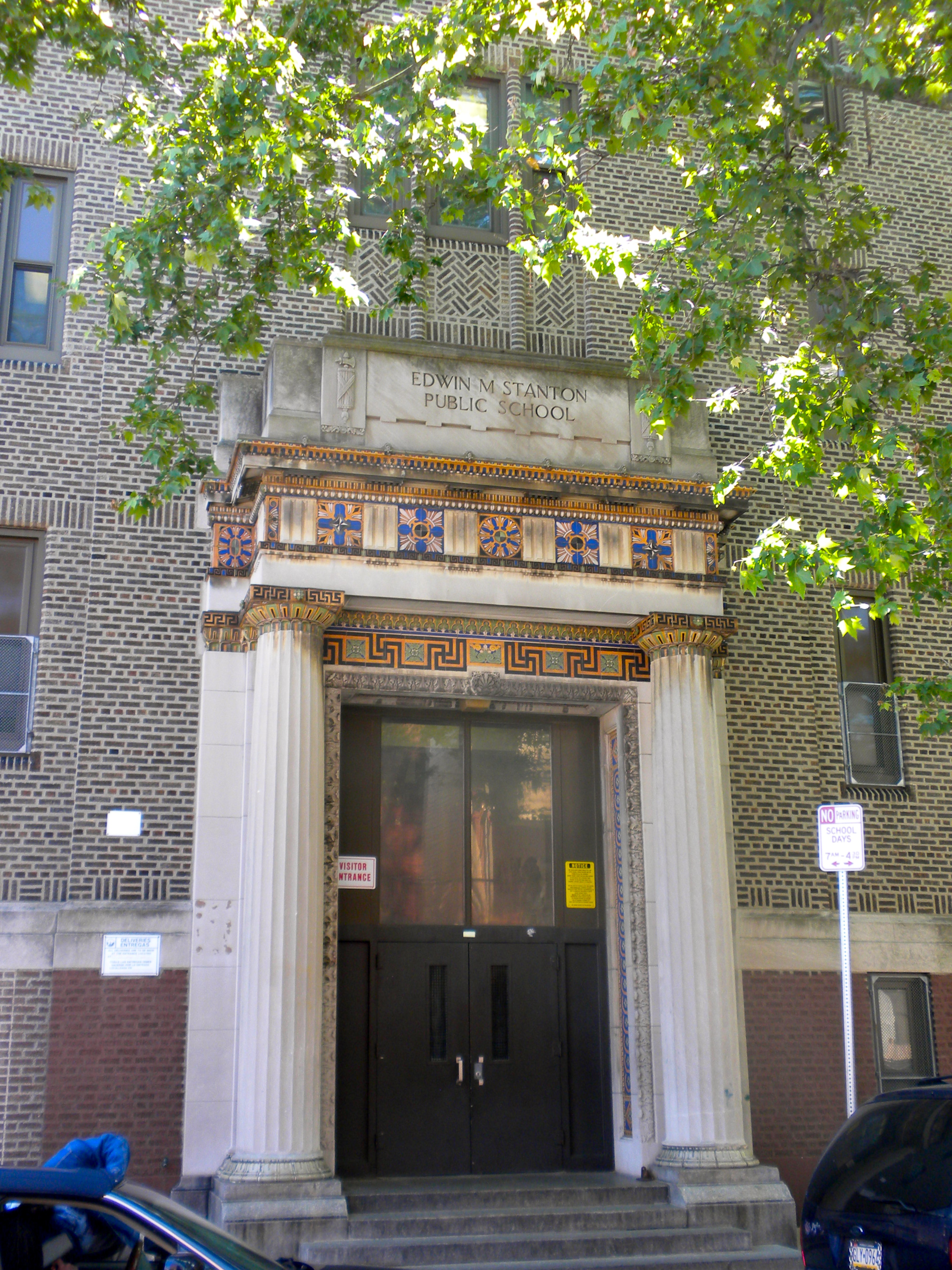
- Edwin M. Stanton School entrance, May 2010

- Location within Philadelphia Location within Pennsylvania Location within the United States
- Location: 1616-1644 Christian St. (901 S. 17th St.), Philadelphia, Pennsylvania
- Coordinates: 39.9404°N 75.1710°W
- Area: less than one acre
- Built: 1925–1926
- Built by: McCloskey & Co.
- Architect: Irwin T. Catharine
- Architectural style: Art Deco
- MPS: Philadelphia Public Schools TR
- NRHP reference No.: 88002326
- Added to NRHP: November 18, 1988

Edwin M. Stanton School is a historic K-8 school located in the Southwest Center City neighborhood of Philadelphia, Pennsylvania, within the Christian Street Historic District. It is part of the School District of Philadelphia.

The building was added to the National Register of Historic Places in 1988.

== History and features ==
The building was designed by Irwin T. Catharine and built in 1925–1926. It is a three-story, 10-bay by 3-bay, made of bricks on a raised basement in the Art Deco-style. The entrance features a portico with Doric order columns and terra cotta colored tiles. It also has a stone cornice with colored terra cotta tile and a brick parapet. The school was named for Edwin M. Stanton.

The building was added to the National Register of Historic Places in 1988.

It feeds students to South Philadelphia High School.

== Alumni ==
- Marian Anderson

== Gallery ==
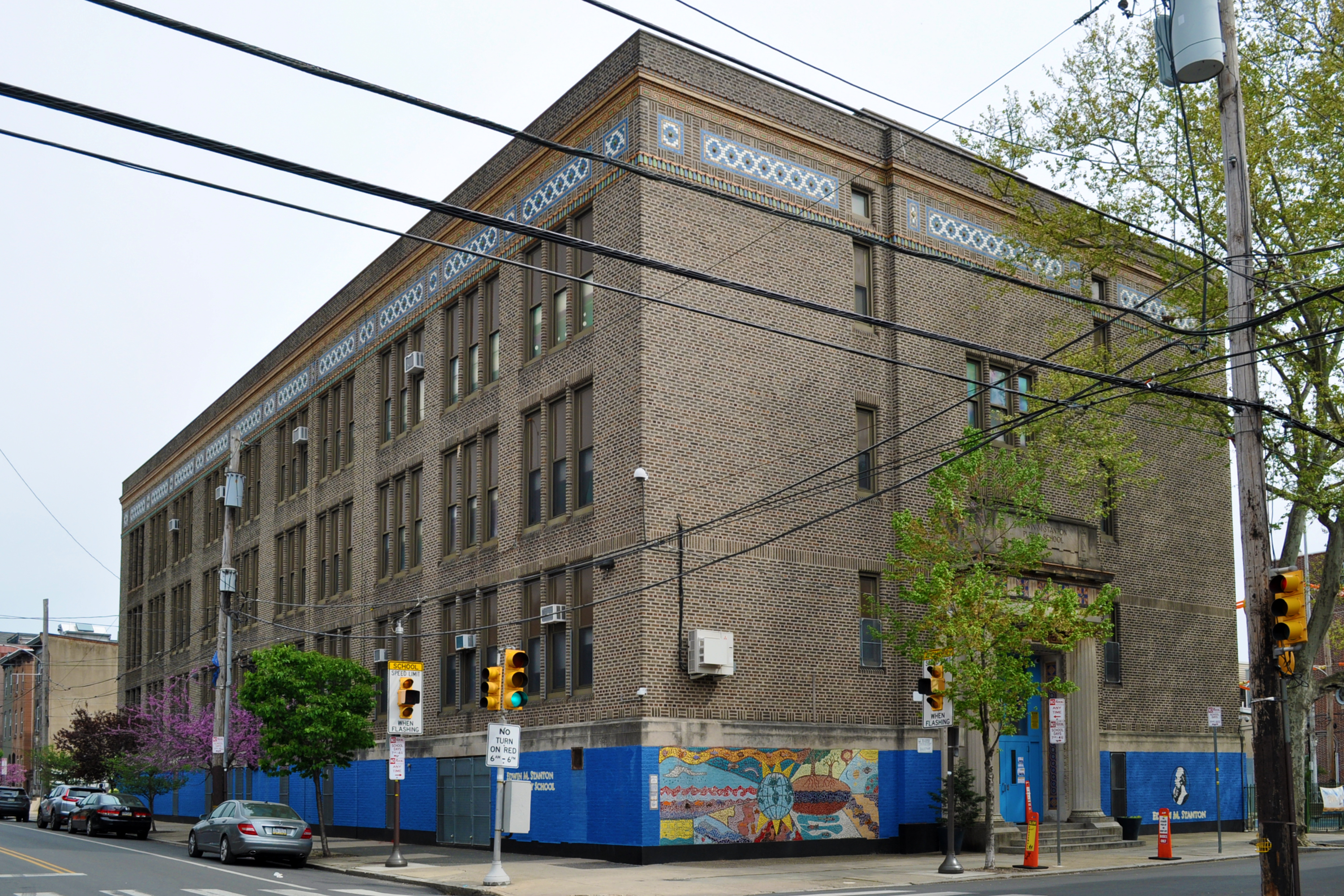

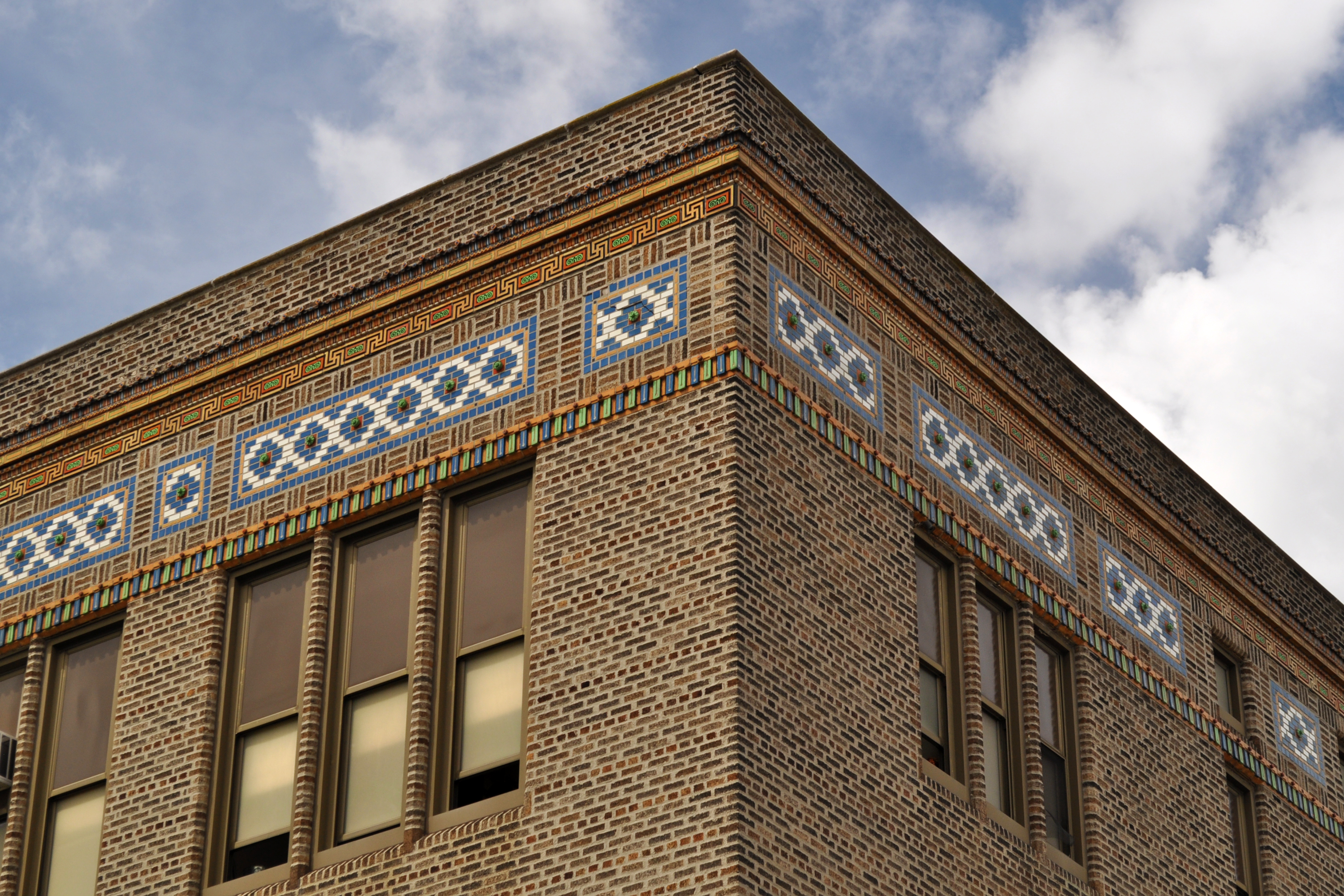

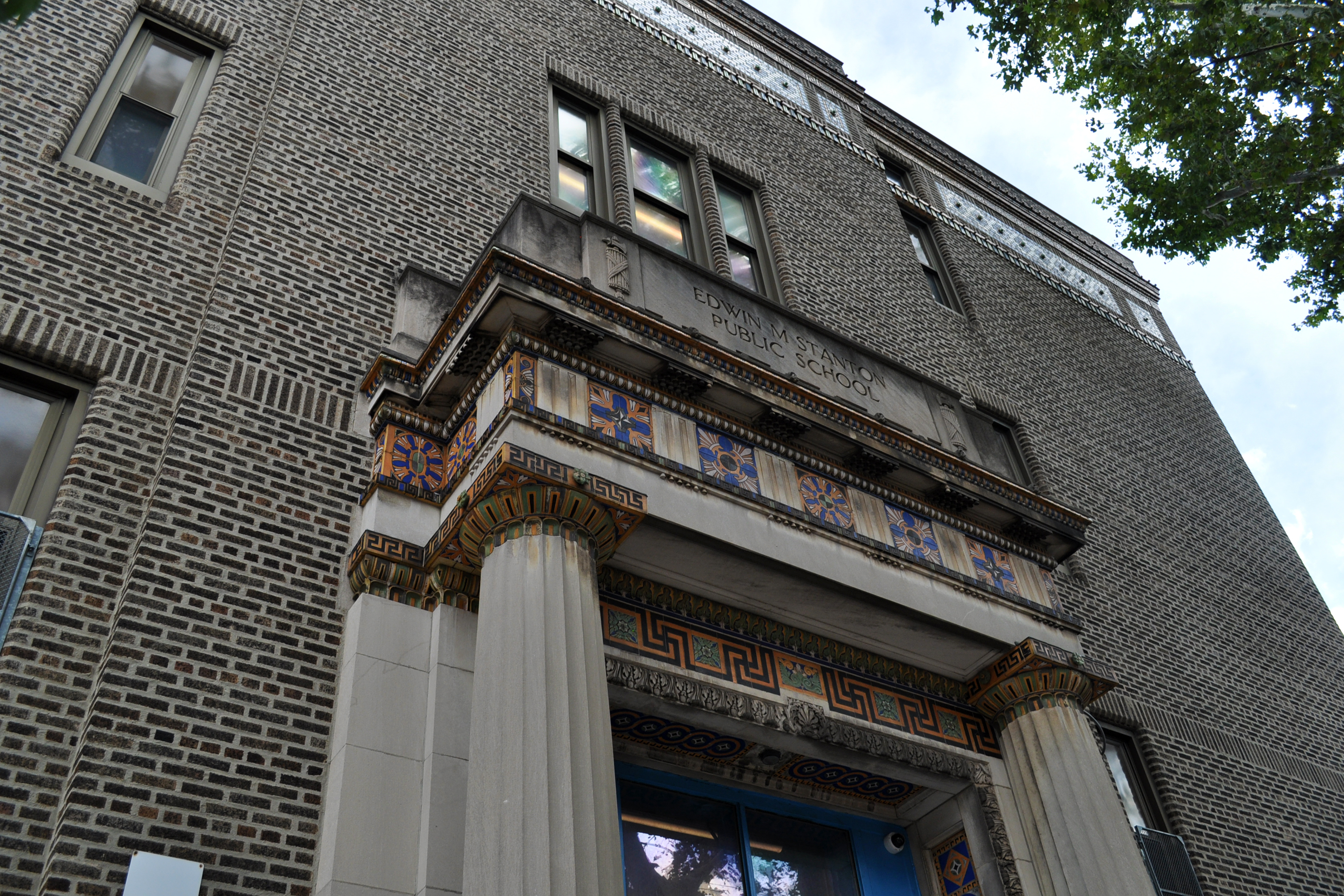

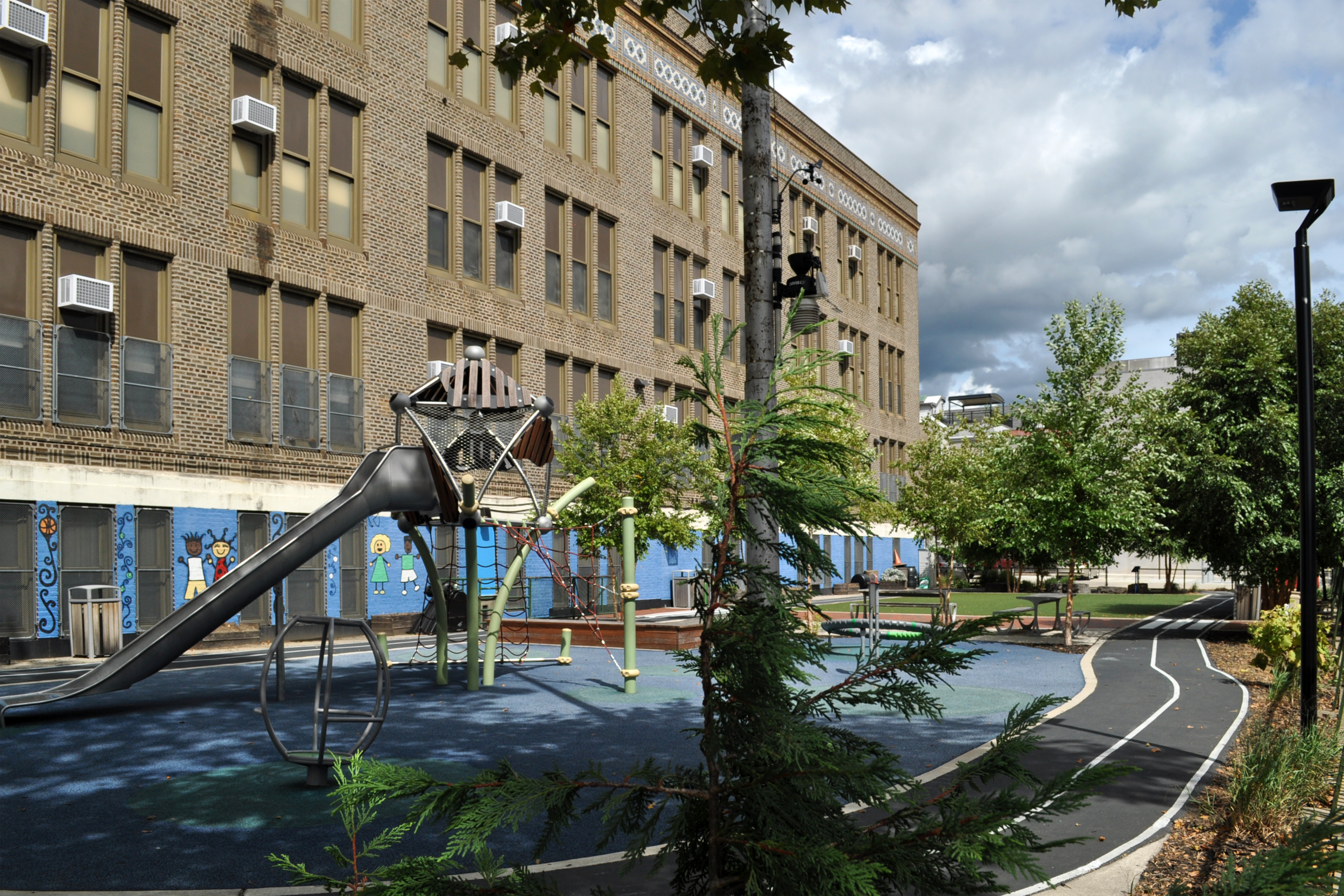
