= Dominion Hills Historic District =

Historic house in Virginia, United States

- U.S. National Register of Historic Places
- U.S. Historic district
- Virginia Landmarks Register
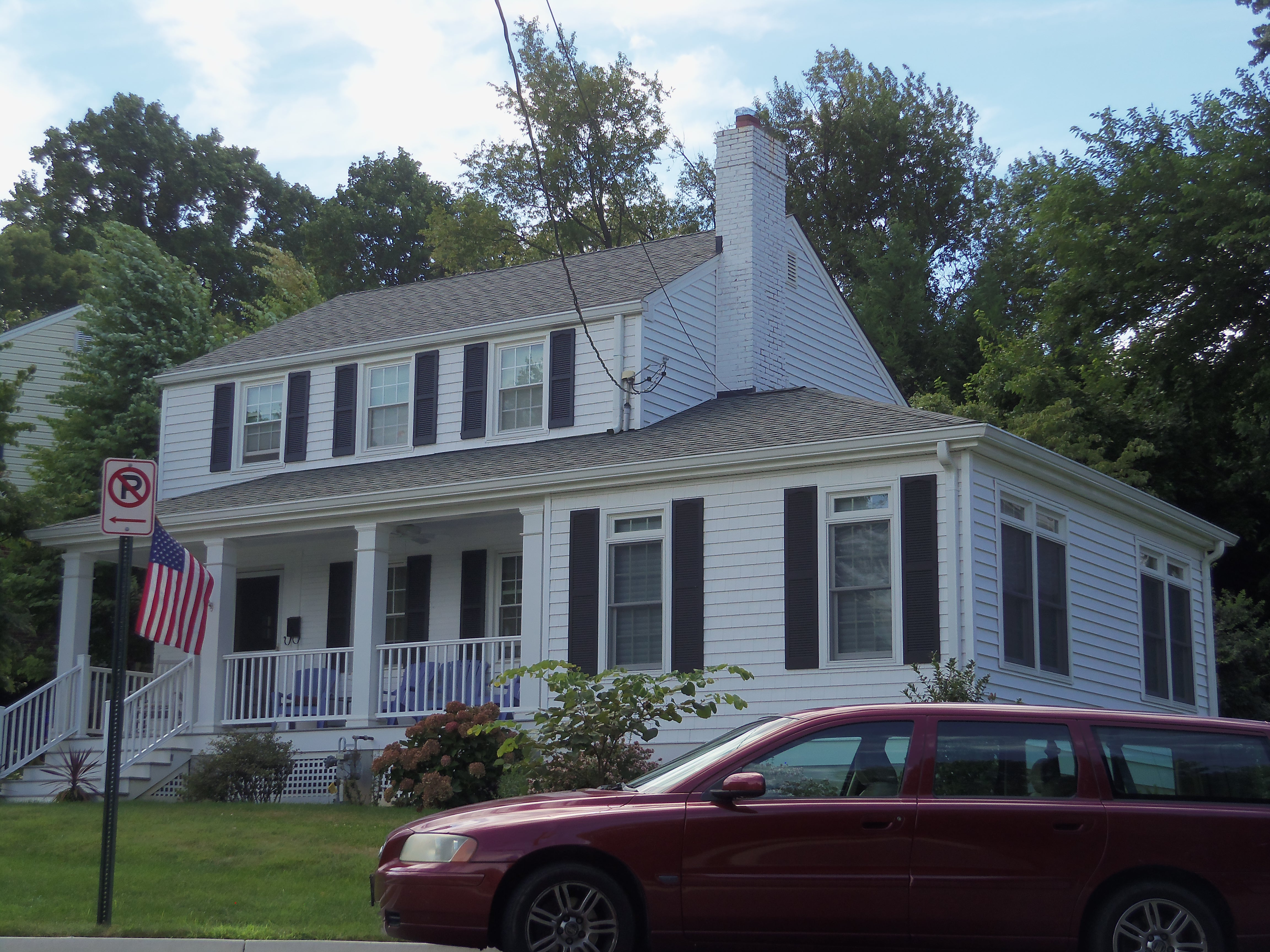
- A house in the Dominion Hills Historic District, August 2013

- Location within District of Columbia Location within Virginia Location within the United States
- Location: Roughly bounded by N. Four Mile Run Dr., N. McKinley Rd., N. Larrimore, N. Madison, N. Montana Sts., & 9th St. N., Arlington, Virginia
- Coordinates: 38°52′33″N 77°08′29″W
- Area: 102 acres (41 ha)
- Built: 1942, 1945-1948
- Built by: Mace Properties, Inc.; Benson & Vest
- Architectural style: Colonial Revival
- MPS: Historic Residential Suburbs in the United States, 1830-1960 MPS
- NRHP reference No.: 12000239
- VLR No.: 000-4212

Significant dates
- Added to NRHP: April 24, 2012
- Designated VLR: December 15, 2011

Dominion Hills Historic District is a national historic district located at Arlington County, Virginia. It contains 446 contributing buildings in a residential neighborhood in western Arlington. It was platted in 1942 and developed between 1945 and 1948. It was designed to attract working and middle-income residents and is composed exclusively of two-story Colonial Revival style dwellings.

It was listed on the National Register of Historic Places in 2012.

== Notable residents ==
- Warren Beatty and Shirley MacLaine, who both grew up to become acclaimed actors, lived with their family at 930 North Liberty Street in the 1950s.
