= Eun Yang =

American television journalist (born 1972)

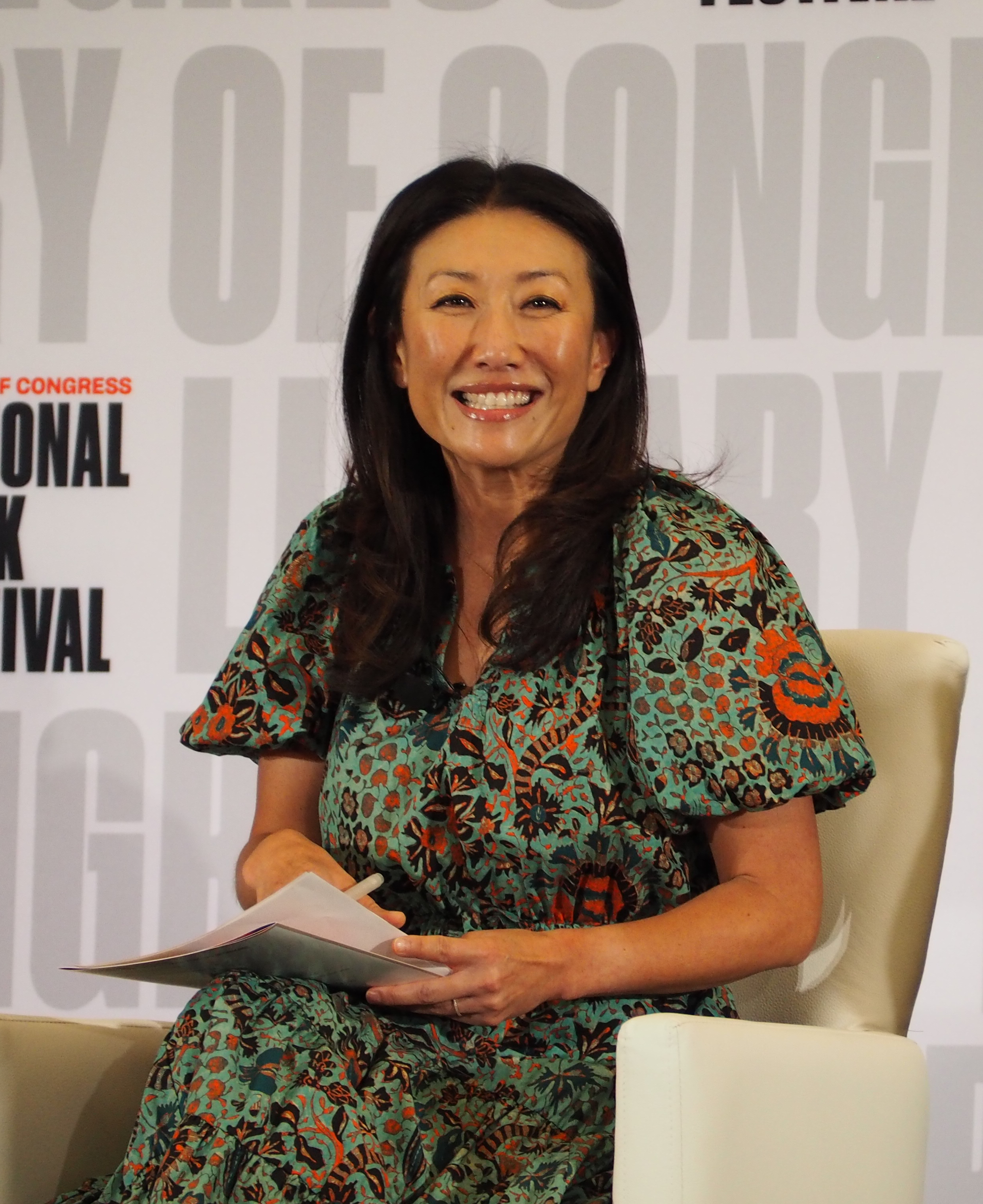
- Yang in 2023
- Born: Seoul, South Korea
- Education: University of Maryland, College Park, (BA)
- Occupation: News anchor
- Years active: 2000–present
- Employer: WRC-TV
- Spouse: Robert Kang
- Children: 3

Eun Yang is an American evening news anchor for WRC-TV, the local NBC-owned television station in Washington, D.C.

Prior to her position at News 4, she was one of the first reporters hired by the National Geographic Channel in Washington, D.C. Earlier she worked at WUSA, where she worked as a production assistant and a reporter trainee.

== Early life ==
Eun Yang was born in Seoul, South Korea, and grew up in the Washington, D.C., area. She graduated from Paint Branch High School in Burtonsville, Maryland. She earned a degree in broadcast journalism from the University of Maryland at College Park. She now sits on the Board of Visitors for the Philip Merrill College of Journalism.

== Professional career ==
Yang began her broadcast journalism career while at the University of Maryland. She worked as a reporter for Maryland Update, a program on the University's cable channel. She then joined the National Geographic Channel as a correspondent for National Geographic Today.

After turning down a job in New York, the nation's number-one market, she joined NBC4 as a reporter.

While working for NBC4, she got the chance to broadcast Olympics 2018 in Seoul, and then again for the Summer Olympics in Tokyo in 2021. She was assigned to cover visits from Pope Francis, and the inaugurations of presidents. In 2019, she won the Emmy Award for being a great host of a restaurant show: the Foodies. Yang currently anchors the weekday editions of News4 at 4, 5, and 6pm. Prior to assuming her evening anchor roles in April 2023, Yang anchored the News4 Today weekday morning newscast for more than a decade alongside co-anchors Joe Krebs, Aaron Gilchrist, and Jummy Olabanji.

== Personal life ==
Yang married Robert Kang. They live in the Washington metro area with their three children.
