= The Philadelphia Independent (1931–1971) =

American tabloid newspaper

The Philadelphia Independent was a newspaper in Philadelphia, Pennsylvania, United States, published from 1931 to 1971 that billed itself as "The World's Greatest Negro Tabloid."

The paper was founded by Forrest White Woodard, who was born in Norfolk, Virginia, on February 12, 1886. He moved as a young man to Philadelphia, Pennsylvania, where he worked at a number of different jobs and operated a number of businesses (including a used car lot and a real estate business) before establishing The Philadelphia Independent in 1931. He was joined by his second wife, Kathryn "Kitty" Fambro Woodard (1911–2003), who took over the day-to-day operation of the newspaper after his death on March 2, 1958. She ran the paper until she sold it in 1966.

Throughout its history, the Independent competed with the Philadelphia Tribune for black readers. Kitty Woodard told The Philadelphia Inquirer in a 1997 interview, "The Independent was for the masses. The Tribune had always been the paper for the upper class. We were militant. We weren't afraid to take on issues like they were."
