= Joe Krebs =

American journalist (1943–2021)

Joe Krebs (March 22, 1943 – April 6, 2021) was an American television news reporter who worked for stations in North Carolina, Maryland, and Washington, D.C., the most recent being WRC-TV. He has been awarded numerous Emmy Awards for his work in broadcasting. He retired from television on March 30, 2012.

== Education ==
Educated by Jesuits, Krebs went to St. Louis University High School, Saint Louis University, and Saint Louis University Law School.

== Career ==
=== Military service ===
After graduating from law school Krebs served in the United States Navy as an Assistant Public Affairs officer aboard the aircraft carrier, U.S.S. John F. Kennedy. "Big John", as the ship was nicknamed, was commissioned September 7, 1968 and decommissioned August 2007.

Before entering the world of news Krebs held the position of Assistant Prosecuting Attorney for St. Louis County. His legal knowledge would later benefit him as a news anchor.

=== Broadcast journalism ===
Some of Krebs' early interest in broadcasting was sparked when he was in the 6th and 7th grade. He and some others would hang around a small African-American radio station near his grade school. The disc jockeys at the station would let them sit in the studio and watch them at work. Krebs also used to love listening to the news on the radio in the car on the way to school. He was "entranced by the romance of the industry".

Krebs started off his broadcasting career at WFMY-TV in Greensboro, North Carolina, in October 1970 and remained there until August 1973. The first year he was a general assignment reporter in Greensboro with special attention to Winston-Salem, North Carolina, and he produced and anchored Sunday newscasts. Krebs spent his second two years serving as the station's national correspondent and covered the state house, the governor's office, and politics in Raleigh, North Carolina. Krebs moved to WBAL-TV, Baltimore in August 1973 and worked there until March 1980.

=== News 4 NBC ===
From 1980 until his retirement on March 30, 2012, Krebs was the morning anchor for News 4 on NBC owned-and-operated station WRC-TV, located in Washington, D.C. In addition to the morning news Krebs also did special cold case reports for "Today". Krebs had been co-hosting the morning news with anchor Barbara Harrison since 1994. However, in 2010 Eun Yang took over when Harrison moved out of the position.

== Awards ==
Krebs received his first Emmy Award for a series of stories he did, titled “Winter on the Chesapeake Bay.” These stories showed the lives of people who work on the Chesapeake Bay, particularly those of oyster farmers, a U.S. Coast Guard icebreaker crew clearing the ship channel during one particularly cold winter, and an older man who had been building wooden boats by hand for many years. Another Emmy was for a horrific gasoline tanker crash on I-270 and the Capital Beltway.

Joe Krebs received numerous awards, including the Maryland Bar Association Gavel Award. This award recognizes reporters who bring attention and understanding of legal issues to the community. His other awards include the Chesapeake Associated Press Award, Metropolitan Area Mass Media Award, three Washington Dateline awards from the Society of Professional Journalists, numerous Emmys, and the Radio Television Digital News Association (RTNDA) Regional Award for Feature reporting.

Krebs has served as the president of the Washington-Baltimore local of American Federation of Television and Radio Artists since 1997. In 2000 Krebs was inducted into the Silver Circle of Washington Chapter of the National Academy of Television Arts and Sciences. He was also on the National Board of the union and was Chair of the National Broadcast Steering Committee.

== Personal life ==
Krebs was a native of Missouri and grew up in St. Louis, Missouri. His father was a physician, and his mother was a dietician. Krebs was the eldest of nine children. He had two daughters and three grandchildren. He and his wife, Mary Lynne, lived in Maryland at the time of his death.

Krebs enjoyed many athletic activities such as hiking, cycling, and swimming. Krebs twice completed the annual 4.4 mile Chesapeake Bay Swim, one of America's premier open water swim challenges. The race begins at the shores of Sandy State Park and ends at a beach on Kent Island. Krebs had also engaged in several self-contained bicycle tours as well as participated in 5 long distance bike rides to raise money for AIDS Service Programs in Washington, D.C.

Krebs died from pancreatic cancer at his home in Rockville, Maryland, on April 6, 2021, at the age of 78.
